= Chen Bochui Children's Literature Award =

Chinese literary award

The Chen Bochui Children's Literature Award (陈伯吹儿童文学奖) is a major award issued in China, with the aim of promoting excellence in children's publishing and cultural diversity. It was originally called the Children's Literary Garden Prize (儿童文学园丁奖), then the Chen Bochui Children's Literature Award from 1988. The first awards were given in 1981, and were awarded every two years. It was renamed as the Chen Bochui International Children's Literature Award (陈伯吹国际儿童文学奖), and since 2014 has been held annually. It is named after the author, translator, journalist and educator Chen Bochui (1906-1997), who translated Pushkin's Children's Tales, The Wizard of Oz, and Don Quixote into Chinese for the first time in the 1940s, and who donated his life savings to establish this award. It is the longest continuously running literary prize in China.

== The 1st to 10th Awards – main prizewinners ==
- Wu Mengqi 吴梦起 《老鼠看下棋》
- Qiu Xun 邱勋 《No! No! No!》
- Zheng Chunhua 郑春华 《圆圆和圈圈》
- Cheng Wei 程玮 《来自异国的孩子（节选）》
- Xiao Yuxuan 萧育轩 《乱世少年》
- Zhu Xinwang 朱新望 《 小狐狸花背（节选）》
- Shen Shixi 沈石溪 《退役军犬黄狐》
- Shen Bai Ying Sha 沈百英妙 《六个矮儿子》
- Shi Yanbing 施雁冰 《鸦鸦》
- Ren Dalin 任大霖 《龙风》
- Yang Xiaoying 杨笑影 《失血的太阳》
- Du Shuzhen 杜淑贞 《十二岁的故事》

== The 11th to 20th Awards – main prizewinners ==
- Zhou Jiting 周基亭 《神秘的眼睛》
- Zhu Xiaowen 朱效文 《风景》
- Jian Ping 简平 《回归》
- Bi Shumin 毕淑敏 《同你现在一般大》
- Xie Hua 谢华 《楼道》
- Gu Ying 谷应 《过客》
- Xie Qianni 谢倩霓 《日子》
- Zhang Zhilu 张之路 《鼓掌员的荣誉》
- Zheng Chunhua 郑春华 《大头儿子和小头爸爸全集 (节选) 》
- Zhou Rui 周锐 《出窍》
- Ren Rongrong 任溶溶

== The 22nd Awards, 2007 ==
Outstanding Contribution 杰出贡献奖

- Ren Daxing 任大星

Main Prize

- Li Yougan 李有干 《大芦荡》 (少年儿童出版社)

Outstanding Works 优秀作品奖

- Zhang Qiusheng 张秋生 《新小巴掌童话》 (中国福利会出版社)
- Li Xuebin 李学斌 《蔚蓝色的夏天》 (新世纪出版社)
- Liu Huo 流火 《黑夜》 (小青蛙报)
- Yin Jianling 殷健灵 《听见萤火虫》 (安徽少年儿童出版社)
- Yu Yujun 郁雨君 《把爸爸寄出去》 (儿童时代)
- Han Qingchen 韩青辰 《飞翔哪怕翅膀断了心》 (少年儿童出版社)
- Xie Qianni 谢倩霓 《青春潘多拉》 (中国福利会出版社)
- Peng Xuejun 彭学军 《同窗的妩媚时光》 (少年儿童出版社)
- Sun Jiancheng 孙建成 《水中的男孩》 (阅读前线)
- Ka Ka 卡卡 《盘子筷子碗》 (少年日报)
- Chang Fusheng 常福生 《有孩子的地方》 (少年儿童出版社)

== The 23rd Awards, 2009 ==
Outstanding Contribution 杰出贡献奖

- Sheng Ye 圣野

Main prize 大 奖

- Qiu Yidong 邱易东 《空巢十二月》 (少年儿童出版社)

Outstanding Works 优秀作品奖

- An Wulin 安武林 《老蜘蛛的一百张床》（书） (中国福利会出版社)
- Zheng Chunhua 郑春华 《非常小子马鸣加》（书） (少年儿童出版社)
- Wei Jie 魏捷 《如果一个小孩想生气》 (儿童时代)
- Yu Yu 俞愉 《SD娃的眼泪》 (儿童文学)
- Xie Qianni 谢倩霓 《家有谢天谢地》（书） (少年儿童出版社)
- Lü Lina 吕丽娜 《如果你有一块钱》 (好儿童画报)
- Tang Tang (writer) 汤汤 《别去5厘米之外》 (少年文艺)
- Peng Yi 彭懿 《我捡到一条喷火龙》（书） (江苏少年儿童出版社)
- Xiao Ping 萧萍 《新年明信片》 (儿童时代)
- Liu Huo 流火 《简单》 (小青蛙报)
- Zhang Huiyue 张晖月 《青春散场》 (少年文艺)

== The 24th Awards, 2011 ==
Outstanding Contribution 杰出贡献奖

- Zhou Xiao 周晓

Main prize 大奖

- Zhang Hong (writer) 张弘 《玫瑰方（短篇小说） 少年文艺

Special Awards 特别奖

- 《上海少年儿童报刊简史》
- Jian Ping 简平 (少年儿童出版社出版）

Outstanding Works 优秀作品奖

- Yin Jianling 殷健灵 《1937•少年夏之秋》（长篇小说）(贵州人民出版社)
- Chi Tang 池塘 《欢迎光临魔法》（长篇小说）
- Peng Yi 彭懿 (明天出版社)
- Xu Ling (writer) 徐玲 《31天忽视被爱》（短篇小说） (少年文艺)
- Wang Chunmin 王春鸣 《一个男孩》 and 《一百条蚕和一个茧》（短篇小说） (儿童文学)
- Lu Ying (writer) 卢颖 《豪猪的花园》（低幼童话） (儿童时代)
- Shen Shixi 沈石溪 《白天鹅》（长篇小说） (少年儿童出版社)
- San San (writer) 三三 《时光中的孩子》（中篇小说） (少年儿童出版社)
- Lu Mei 陆梅 《当着落叶纷飞》（长篇小说） (接力出版社)
- Zhang Jie (writer) 张洁 《最亮的一盏灯》（散文集） (明天出版社)
- Ci Qi 慈 琪 《命名》（poetry） (少年日报)

== The 25th Awards, 2013 ==
Outstanding Contribution 杰出贡献奖

- Sun Yi (writer) 孙毅

Main prizewinners 大奖

- Peng Yi 彭懿 《老师，操场上有个小妖怪叫我》（长篇幻想小说） (明天出版社)

Outstanding works 优秀作品奖

- Tang Tang (writer) 汤汤 《喜地的牙》（中篇童话） (少年儿童出版社)
- Shu Huibo 舒辉波 《和陌生人共进下午茶》（短篇小说） (少年文艺)
- Feng Yulan (writer) 冯与蓝 《一条杠也是杠》（短篇小说） (少年文艺)
- Wang Yongying 王勇英 《弄泥小时候》（长篇小说） (少年儿童出版社)
- Lao Chen 老臣 《远行的鸟群》（短篇小说集） (少年儿童出版社)
- Xiao He Ding Ding 小河丁丁 《白公山的刺梅》（短篇小说） (少年文艺)
- Xiao Ping 萧萍 《2012年12月21日冬至》（多文体）(儿童时代)
- Pang Jielei 庞婕蕾 《橘子味的夏天》（中篇小说） (明天出版社)
- Xie Qianni 谢倩霓 《草长莺飞时节》（长篇小说） (中国少年儿童出版社)
- Zhang Jie (writer) 张洁 《穿着绿披风的吉莉》（童话绘本）(湖北少年儿童出版社)

== The 2014 Chen Bochui International Children's Literature Awards ==
Jury Members: Fang Weiping 方卫平 (China), Zhu Chengliang 朱成梁 (China), Roger Mello (Brazil), Nathalie Beau (France), Maria Jesús Gil (Spain), Ye Xin 叶辛 (China), Lin Wenbao 刘文宝 (Taiwan), Hai Fei 海飞 (China)

Best Contributions to Children's Magazines 2014

- Xiaohe Dingding A Wine-Loving Stubborn Old Man 小河丁丁：《爱喝糊粮酒的倔老头》（少年文艺2013年11期）
- Ren Yongheng To Grow Up in a Day 任永恒L《一下子长大》（少年文艺2013年7期）
- Zhang Zhilu The Bookstore Around the Corner 张之路：《拐角书店》（儿童文学2013年第4期）
- Chen Wenwen Decimal Points in Summer 陈问问：《夏天的小数点》（少年文艺2013年第8期）
- Shu Huibo Please Listen to Me 舒辉波：《你听我说》（儿童文学2013年第3期）

Best Picture Books of the Year, 2014

- Whose Home Is It? by author/illustrator Liu Xugong (Hsin-Yi Foundation Publishing House) 刘旭恭：《谁的家到了？》（信谊基金出版社）
- Mulan, illustrated by Cai Gao (artist) (Tomorrow Publishing House) 蔡皋：《花木兰》（明天出版社）
- If You Want to See a Whale, text by Julie Fogliano, illustrated by Erin E. Stead (Roaring Book Press, USA)
- Mr Tiger Goes Wild, by author/illustrator Peter Brown (illustrator) (Macmillan Children's Books, UK)
- The Piggy Who Lost a Tooth, text by Gao Hongbo (writer), illustrated by Li Rong (illustrator) (China Children's Press and Publishing Group) 高洪波：《掉牙小猪》 (中国少年儿童新闻出版社)

Best Literary Works of the Year, 2014

- Tiny Little City, by Xue Tao (writer) (Aurora Publishing House) 薛涛：《小城池》（晨光出版社）
- To Future You: 15 Letters to a Girl, by Yin Jianling (Qingdao Publishing House) 殷健灵：《致未来的你—给女孩的十五封信》（青岛出版社）
- Say Goodbye with a Smile, by Pang Jielei (Tomorrow Publishing House) 庞婕蕾：《微笑说再见》（明天出版社）

Best Author of the Year, 2014

- Roger Mello
- Jin Bo (writer) 金波

Special Contribution Award, 2014

- Hai Fei 海飞
- Patricia Aldana

== The 2015 Chen Bochui International Children's Literature Awards ==
Jury Members: Ye Xin 叶辛 (China)， Maria Jesus Gil (Spain), Nathalie Beau (France), Piet Grobler (South Africa), Zhang Zizhang 张子樟(Taiwan), Zhang Zhilu 张之路 (China), Liu Haiqi 刘海栖 (China), Liu Xuyuan 刘绪源 (China), Zhou Xiang 周翔 (China)

Best Contributions to Children's Magazines 2015

- Tang Tang (writer) Kakasha the Water Monster 汤汤：《水妖喀喀莎》（儿童文学2014年第4期）
- Wang Yongying Qingdie and the Celadon Plate 王勇英：《青蝶》（儿童文学2014年第3期）
- Wang Luqi The Realm of Snow 王璐琪：《雪的国》（少年文艺2014年第11期）
- Shi Lei (writer) Dingjun Hill 史雷：《定军山》（儿童文学2014年第7期）
- Gu Shu The Circle 顾抒：《圈》（少年文艺2014年第5期）

Best Picture Books of the Year, 2015 (with prize money of 20,000 yuan (or $3,140) each):

- Shh! We Have a Plan by author/illustrator Chris Haughton (writer) (Walker Books, U.K.)
- The Ballad of Mulan, text by Chun-Liang YEH, illustrated by Clemence Pollet (HongFei Cultures, France)
- Special Delivery text by Philip C. Stead, illustrated by Matthew Cordell (Roaring Brook/Porter, U.S.)
- The Running Town text by Wang Yadong, illustrated by Song Xiankui (Hsin Yi Publications, Taiwan) 王亚东/麦克小奎：《跑跑镇》
- Smoke text by Cao Wenxuan, illustrated by Yu Rong (21st Century Publishing Group, China) 曹文轩/郁蓉：《烟》

Best Literary Works of the Year, 2015

- I Wish to Grow into a Green Chinese Onion by Chang Xingang (Qingdao Publishing House) 常新港：《我想长成一棵葱》（青岛出版社）
- The Glory of the Youth, by Li Donghua (Hope Publishing House) 李东华：《少年的荣耀》（希望出版社）
- The Bald-Headed Principal, by Zheng Chunhua (Juvenile and Children's Publishing House) 郑春华：《光头校长》（少年儿童出版社）
- The Young Witness, by Han Qingchen (Zhejiang Juvenile and Children's Publishing House) 韩青辰：《小证人》（浙江少年儿童出版社）
- The Bloody Horse, by Gerelchimeg Black Crane (Jieli Publishing House) 格日勒其木格。黑鹤：《血驹》（接力出版社）

Best Author of the Year, 2015

- Hanne Bartholin

Special Contribution Award, 2015

- Jiang Feng 蒋风

== The 2016 Chen Bochui International Children's Literature Awards ==
Jury Members: Ye Xin 叶辛 (China), Roger Mello (Brazil), Piet Grobler (South Africa), Junko Yokota (USA), Xu Jiankun 许建昆 (Taiwan), Xiao Fuxing 肖复兴 (China), Liu Xuyuan 刘绪源 (China), Zhu Ziqiang 朱自强 (China), Yao Hong 姚红 (China) Each prize carried a cash award of 20,000 Chinese yuan (US$2,900).

Best Picture Books

- Beautiful Birds by Jean Roussen, illustrated by Emmanuelle Walker (Flying Eye)
- It's My War by Thomas Scotto, illustrated by Barroux (Editions Les 400 Coups)
- Chien des Villes by Alexandra Garibal, illustrated by Fred Benaglia (Gallimard Jeunesse)
- The Plaits by Hei Mi (author and illustrator) (Daylight Publishing House)
- Old Tyre by Jia Wei, illustrated by Zhu Chengliang (Jiangsu Phoenix Juvenile and Children's Publishing)

Best Literary Works of 2016

- Looking for King Fish by Zhang Wei (Tomorrow Publishing House)
- Firebrand by Cao Wenxuan (Daylight Publishing House)
- The Legendary Fox and the Youth by Peng Yi (Chenguang Publishing House)
- My Marble-Hearted Father by Qin Wenjun (Juvenile and Children's House)

Special Contribution Award, 2016

- Maria Jesus Gil (Spain), for making "a significant contribution to the renovation of Spanish children's literature", and serving as a president of the Hans Christian Andersen Award, had also forged strong links with China in recent years, serving as a jury member for the Chen Bochui and supporting the Shanghai International Children's Book Fair.

Author of the Year Award, 2016

- Zhu Chengliang

== The 2017 Chen Bochui International Children's Literature Awards ==
Jury members: Gao Hongbo (writer), Junko Yokota, Javier Zabala, Sophie Van der Linde, Yanwu Chanxia, Xu Lu (writer), Liu Xuyuan, Sun Jianjiang and Yang Zhong

Best Picture Books

- Le Ruban, by Adrien Parlange (France) 阿德里安·帕朗热:《缎带》(阿尔班·米歇尔少儿出版社）
- Du Iz Tak?, by Carson Ellis (USA)《这是什么？》(烛芯出版社)
- [Walk with the Wind], by Xiong Liang (China)《和风一起散步》(天津人民出版社)
- [Lying down, looking at the sky], by Ursula Palusinska (Poland)《懒洋洋地躺下，望着天空》(姐妹出版社)
- [Laba Festival : rice porridge under the eaves], Zheng Chunhua, illus. Zhu Chengliang (China) 郑春华 (文)，朱成梁 (绘): 《屋檐下的腊八粥》（少年儿童出版社)

Best Literary Works of 2017

- Shu Huibo (China) 舒辉波:《梦想是生命里的光》(少年儿童出版社)
- Huang Beijia (China) 黄蓓佳:《童眸》(江苏凤凰少年儿童出版社)
- Xiao Ping (China) 萧萍）《沐阳上学记：男孩女孩那些事儿》(浙江文艺出版社)
- Guo Jiangyan (China) 《布罗镇的邮递员》(少年儿童出版社)
- Zhang Zhilu (China) 《吉祥时光》(作家出版社)

Best Contributions to Children's Magazines 2017

- Tang Tang (writer) 汤汤:《门牙阿上小传》
- Ma Xiaozao 马三枣:《鸟衔落花》
- Wan Xiufen 万修芬:《什么都有的集山》
- Qi Zhi 祁智:《大鱼》
- Gu Shu 顾抒:《野蜂飞舞》

Special Contribution Award, 2017

- Helen Wang

Author of the Year Award, 2016

- Qin Wenjun

== The 2018 Chen Bochui International Children's Literature Awards ==
Best literary work of the year

- Reindeer Through Six Seasons (Gerelchimeg Blackcrane, Tomorrow Publishing House)
- A-Lian (Tang Sulan, Hunan Children's Publishing House )
- Blooming with Happiness in the Dulong Area: Our Minzu Primary School (Wu Ran, Aurora Publishing House)
- Teacher Turtle 1: A Beach on Campus (Cheng Wei, Zhejiang Juvenile and Children's Publishing House)
- That Year in the Blizzard (Liu Hu, Shanghai Children's Press)

Best picture book of the year

- The Wolf, the Duck, and the Mouse (Mac Barnett, ills by Jon Klassen, Walker Books)
- Where Have the Tickets Gone? (Liu Xugong, Global Views)
- Grandma’s Magic of Cloth Scraps (Ao Zi, 21st Century Publishing Group)
- The Day War Came (Nicola Davies, illus by Rebecca Cobb, Walker Books)
- Animalphabet (Julia Donaldson Illustrator: Sharon King-Chai, Pan Macmillan)

Best single piece of the year

- ‘Impressions of the Insects’ (Jin Bo, Shao Nian Wen Yi magazine)
- ‘Paper Kiln’ (Peng Xuejun, Children’s Literature magazine)
- ‘Tonight, You’re Kings of Fourteen’ (Xiao Ping, Children’s Literature magazine)
- ‘Father Ram’ (Zhang Zhongcheng, Children’s Literaturemagazine)
- ‘Draw a Moon for the Lonely Night Sky’ (Jia Ying, Shao Nian Wen Yi magazine).

Special Contribution Award

- Zhang Mingzhou

Best Author

- Hervé Tullet

== The 2019 Chen Bochui International Children's Literature Awards ==
Best literary work of the year

- Old Rat Gets up Late (Ye Guangqin, Beijing Children's Publishing House)
- Summer with Pigeons (Liu Haiqi, Shandong Education Press)
- Fireworks (Li Donghua, Changjiang Literature and Art Press)
- Chasing (Xu Lu, Changjiang Children's Press)
- Flight of the Bumblebee (Huang Beijia, Jiangsu Phoenix Juvenile and Children's Publishing House)

Best picture book of the year

- A Flying Bullet (Bai Bing (writer), illus by Liu Zhenjun, China Children's Press & Publication House)
- Don’t Let Sun Fall (Guo Zhenyuan, illus Zhu Chengliang, China Peace Publishing House)
- Great War (Andre Antinori, Italian Corraini Publishing House (Text & Photo by Andre Antinori)
- Head & Tail: Insects (John Canty, Australian Burbey Press Private Limited Company)
- Anhedrina (Roger Mello, illus Mariana Mazzarini, Brazilian Alphabet Publishing House)

Best single piece of the year

- Outward-facing Toe Cap (Long Xiangmei)
- A Million Tomorrow (Qin Yingliang)
- Children from Mountains (Yi Ping)
- Only An Article (Wang Wenhua (writer))

Special Contribution Award

- Leonard S. Marcus

Best Author

- Ren Rongrong

== The 2020 Chen Bochui International Children's Literature Awards ==
Best Literary Works in Chinese Language

- A Non-existent Villa 不存在的小镇, by Huang Yingzhao (China Juvenile and Children's Publishing House, 2019)
- Building a Ceramic Kiln and Giving It to You 建座瓷窑送给你, by Peng Xuejun (21st Century Publishing Group, 2019)
- Xiao Su and I 我和小素, by Huang Chunhua (Anhui Juvenile and Children's Publishing House, 2020)
- Running Dai Er’niu 奔跑的岱二牛, by Huang Beijia (Phoenix Juvenile and Children's Publishing Ltd, 2019)
- A Smile Among Thorns: Xiao Cong 荆棘丛中的微笑：小丛, by Yang Xiaoyan (21st Century Publishing Group, 2020)

Best Picture Books of the Year

- 1.º Direito (First Floor Right) 一楼右侧, by Ricardo Henriques; illus. Nicolau Fernandes (Pato Lógico Edições, Portugal, 2020)
- Mr. Black and His Dog 布莱克先生和他的狗, by Jiu’er (Guizhou People's Publishing House, 2019)
- A Falling Whale 天上掉下一头鲸, by Xi Yuke (Daylight Publishing House, China, 2019)
- The Snow Comes Around 下雪天的声音, by Mei Zihan, illus. Igor Oleynikov (Guizhou People's Publishing House, China, 2019)
- The Truth about Old People 老者的真相, by Elina Ellis (Two Hoots, UK, 2020)

Special Contribution Award

- Zhang Qiusheng 张秋生 (China) - writer of fairy tales and children's poems, publisher

Best Author of the Year Award

- Ed Young

== The 2021 Chen Bochui International Children's Literature Awards ==
Best Literary Works in Chinese Language

- 《和平方舟的孩子》(Children of Peace Ark) by Jian Ping (Juvenile & Children's Publishing House, 2020)
- 《逐光的孩子》(Children who Follow the Light) by Shu Huibo (21st Century Publishing Group, 2020)
- 《最后的比分》(The Final Score) by Zhang Pincheng (Changjiang Children's Publishing Group, 2020)
- 《世界上没有真正的空房子》(There is No Real Empty House in the World) by Liu Dong (Fujian Children's Publishing House, 2020)
- 《绿珍珠》(Green Pearl) by Tang Tang (Zhejiang Juvenile and Children's Publishing House, 2020)

Best Picture Books of the Year

- Pandemic by Jackie French (text), Bruce Whatley (ill.) (Scholastic Australia, 2020)
- Sulla vita sfortunata dei vermi (On the Unfortunate Life of Worms) by Noemi Vola (text & ill.) (Corraini Edizioni, 2021)
- 《泥叫叫》(Animal-Shaped Earthen Whistles) by Wang Zumin (text & ill.) (Dolphin Press, 2021)
- 《三个朋友》(Three Friends) by Liu Haiqi (text), Luo Ling (ill.) (Tomorrow Publishing House, 2021)
- 《喜鹊窝》(The Nest of Magpies) by Hai Fei (text), Yang Bo (ill.) (Qingdao Publishing House, 2021)

Special Contribution Award

- Sheng Ye (poet)

Best Author of the Year Award

- Michael Morpurgo

== The 2022 Chen Bochui International Children's Literature Awards ==
Best Literary Works in Chinese Language

- 《小鼠雕像》(Mouse Statue) by Shi Ruoxin 石若昕 ("Reading Friend" Publishing House)
- 《从前有一个故事》(Once Upon a Time there was a story) by Long Xiangmei 龙向梅 (Guangxi shifan daxue chubanshe)
- 《你看月亮的脸》(See the moon's face) by Li Qiuyuan 李秋沅 (Zhejiang shaonian ertong chubanshe)
- 《航海家归来》 (The Voyager Returns) by Wang Xiumei 王秀梅 (Qingdao chubanshe)
- 《喓喓草虫》 (The Chirping of Crickets in the Grass) by Huang Wenjun (Yunnan Chenguang chubanshe)

Best Picture Books of the Year

- 《不一样的1》(different no. 1s) by Wu Yanan 吴亚男 (text), Liu Longsha 柳垄沙 (ill.) (Xinyi tuhuashu / Mingtian chubanshe)
- 《夏天的故事》(Story of Summer) by Wei Jie 魏捷 (text), Li Xiaoguang (illus.) (Pupulan huibenguan/Xinshijie chubanshe)
- 《爸爸和我》(Dad and me) by Zhang Yaling (Xinyi jijin chubanshe, Taiwan)
- 《Thingumabob》 by Marianna Coppo
- 《一小块天空》(A Little Piece of Sky), by Li Shunyu 李顺玉 (Korea)

Special Contribution Award

- Cai Gao 蔡皋

Best Author of the Year Award

- Kate DiCamillo

== The 2023 Chen Bochui International Children's Literature Awards ==
Best Literary Works in Chinese Language

- 《金唢呐》(The Golden Suona) by Dong Hongyou 董宏猷
- 《万花筒》(Kaleidoscope) by Lu Mei 陆梅
- 《瓦屋山桑》(Tiled Roof and Mulberry) by Zhang Guolong 张国龙
- 《在世界的拐角守望你》(Keeping you safe in a corner of the world) by Yi Ping 翌平
- 《羊的草》 (The Sheep’s Grass) by Chen Cheng 陈澄

Best Picture Books of the Year

- 《火城1938》(City on Fire 1938) written by Cai Gao 蔡杲，illus. by Cai Gao 蔡杲 and Xiao Aozi 萧翱子
- 《奶奶的花园》(My Baba’s Garden) by Jordan Scott, illus. by Sydney Smith - USA
- 《有一 天》(One Day) by Xu Xuanting 徐瑄廷 – Korea
- 《吸呼》(Breathing) by Hu Yifan 胡一凡
- 《炒豆粉，香喷喷》(Fried Crushed Beans Smell So Good) by Chen Xunru 陈巽如 and He Peng 贺鹏

New Sinophone Writers Prize

- Maizi 麦子 （廖小琴）
- Chang Xiaoyu 常笑予
- Da Wu 大吴 （吴华超）

Special Contribution Award

- Yu Rong 郁蓉 (UK)

Best Author of the Year Award

- Tang Sulan 汤素兰
