= Yin Jianling =

Chinese children's writer

- 殷健灵
- Born: October 1971 (age 54); Shanghai, China
- Education: East China Normal University; Shanghai Normal University
- Occupation: Writer
- Writing career
- Language: Chinese
- Period: 1989–present
- Genre: Novel

Yin Jianling (simplified Chinese: 殷健灵; traditional Chinese: 殷健靈; pinyin: Yīn Jiànlíng; born October 1971) is a Chinese writer of children's literature. She is senior editor of the Shanghai newspaper Xinmin wanbao.

== Education ==
Born in Shanghai in October 1971, Yin has a BA from the Law and Politics Department, at Huadong Normal University, and an MA from the Chinese Literature Department at Shanghai Normal University.

== Writing career ==
Yin was eighteen when her poetry was published in Youth Literature and Art《少年文艺》. She has continued to write and publish poetry, essays, novels, and reportage, and opinions. She was the editor-in-chief of a woman's magazine, and is now senior editor of the Shanghai newspaper Xinmin wanbao. She became a member of the China Writers Association in 1998, and has a key role in the Shanghai Writers Association. She is particularly well known for her writing for children, in particular for adolescent girls.

== Awards ==
Yin has won numerous awards for her books, including the prestigious Chen Bochui Awards for Children's Literature.

- 2014 - Winner of a Chen Bochui Children's Literature Award - for The Sound of Fireflies
- 2013 - Nominated for an Astrid Lindgren Memorial Award (ALMA)
- 2011 - Winner of a Chen Bochui Children's Literature Award - for 1937 - Autumn in the Summer of Youth
- 2007 - Winner of a Chen Bochui Children's Literature Award - for To Future You - 15 Letters for a Girl

== Selected publications ==
[The translated titles are approximate]

- 1995 -《盛开的心情》[Bright Mood] - poetry
- 1996 -《纯真季节》[Pure Seasons] - essays
- 1997 -《玻璃鸟》[Glass Bird] - autobiographical novel (prize-winning)
- 2000 -《纸人》[Paper Figure] - novel (prize-winning)
- 2000 -《月亮茶馆里的童年》[Childhood in the Moonlight Teahouse] - novel (prizewinning)
- 2001 -《临界情感》[Critical Emotion] - women's essays
- 2002 -《热点女人》[Focus on Women] - creative non-fiction
- 2003 -《轮子上的麦小麦》[Mai Xiaomai on the Wheel] - novel
- 2004 -《记得那年花下》[Remembering that year beneath the flowers] - essays
- 2004 -《米兰公寓》[Milan Apartments] - novella
- 2004 -《殷健灵少女物语》[Yin Jianling's Stories about Girls] (3 vols)
- 2004 -《爱情无耻》[Love Without Shame] - essays
- 2005/06 -《风中之樱》[Cherries in the Wind] (4 vols) - fantasy novel
- 2006 -《听见萤火虫》[The Sound of Fireflies] - essays 安徽少年儿童出版社
- 2007 -《一滴秘密的眼泪》[A Secret Teardrop] - novellas
- 2007 -《遇见从前》[Meeting the Past]
- 2008 -《蜻蜓，蜻蜓》[Dragonfly, Dragonfly] (prize-winning)
- 2008 -《一定找到你》[Definitely Found You] - essays for children中国福利会出版社
- 2008 -《靠近你，靠近我》[Close to You, Close to Me] - collected works
- 2008 -《画框里的猫·出逃》[Cat in the Picture Frame: Fleeing] - short stories (prize-winning)
- 2009 -《1937·少年夏之秋》[1937 - Autumn of the Summer of Youth] (prize-winning)
- 2009 -《凯蒂的幸福时光》[The Happiness of Kati] - translation of Jane Vejjajiva's novel
- 2009 -《纯情游走》[Innocent Walk] - collection
- 2010 -《你的小船你的帆》[Your Boat, Your Sail] - novellas
- 2011 -《殷健灵作品精选》[The Best of Yin Jianling] - collection
- 2011 -《轮子上的麦小麦》[Mai Xiaomai on the wheel] - novella
- 2011 -《风中之樱》[Cherry in the Wind] (2 vols) - fantasy novel (new edition)
- 2011 -《零度情感》[Zero Degree Feelings] - essays
- 2011 -《画框里的猫》[Cat in the Picture Frame),《夏日和声》[Summer Harmony] - in Swedish
- 2011 -《掌心里的蓝月亮》[Blue Moon in the Palm of My Hand]
- 2011 -《看时间流过》[Watching Time Pass By] (with Tang Yunhui 唐云辉)
- 2012 -《一定找到你》[Definitely Found You]
- 2012 -《俯瞰天堂——米开朗基罗艺术与人生的“昼夜晨暮”》[A Bird's Eye View of Paradise: Michelangelo's art and "Morning and Evening" of life]
- 2012 -《殷健灵获奖作品集美绘版》 [Yin Jianling's Prize-winning Works]:《纸人》[Paper Person],《听见萤火虫》[The Sound of Fireflies],《画框里的猫》[Cat in the Picture Frame]
- 2012 -《幸运的坏男孩》[The Lucky Bad Boy] - translation of novel
- 2012 -《你可听见沙漏的声音》[You Can Hear The Sand in the Hourglass] - essay (prize-winning) 获首届《儿童文学》金近奖
- 2012 -《和夏天约会》[Summer Meeting] - poetry
- 2013 -《甜美小镇》[Beautiful Town]
- 2013 -《薄荷糖》[Mint Sweets] - short stories
- 2013 -《纯真记事簿》[Notebook of Innocence] - series of stories
- 2013 -《致未来的你——给女孩的十五封信》[For the Future You - 15 Letters for Girls] - letters/essays
- 2013 -《莲花般的女孩》[Lotus Girl]
- 2013 -《安安的蜻蜓》[An-An's Dragonfly]
- 2016 -《野芒坡》[Yemangpo] - novel
- 2021 - The Visible Sounds - picture book, illustrated by Yu Rong, tr. Filip Selucky (UClan Publishing) ISBN 9781912979790
