= Yu Rong =

Chinese illustrator

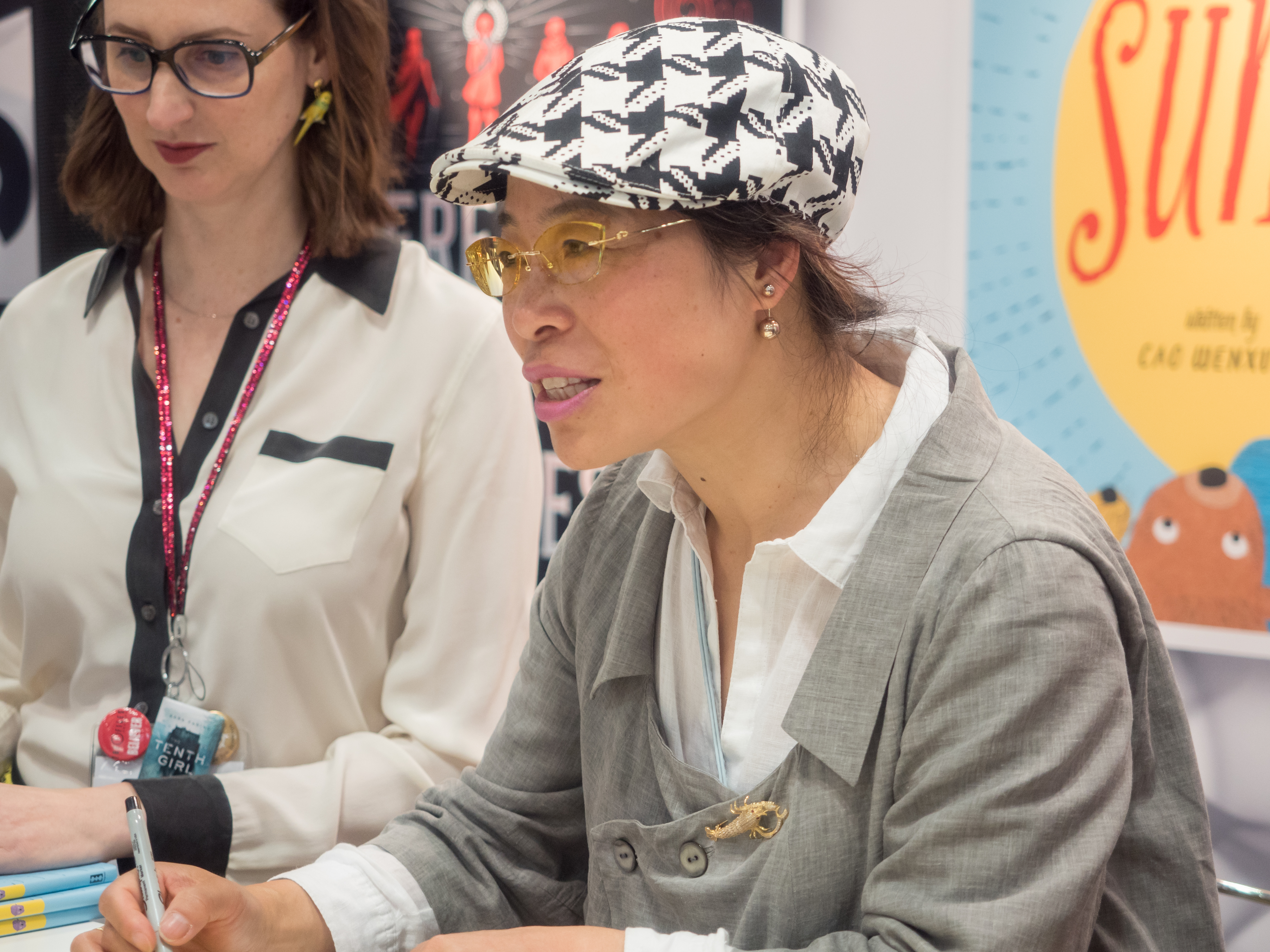
- Yu Rong at BookExpo 2019
- Education: Royal College of Art
- Occupations: Illustrator, teacher
- Awards: Sheila Robinson Drawing Prize (2000); Chen Bochui Children's Literature Award (2015)

Yu Rong (Chinese: 郁蓉) is a Chinese illustrator of children's picture books, especially known for her use of papercutting artwork.

== Biography ==
Born in China, Yu Rong first trained as a primary school teacher, then studied for a BA in Chinese Painting and Contemporary Art Design (Nanjing Normal University's Art College) and an MA in Communication and Design (Royal College of Art, London). She now lives near Cambridge, UK.

== Awards, honours, exhibitions ==
- 1999 - The Folio Society Illustration Awards
- 1999 - The Quentin Blake Award for Narrative Illustration
- 2000 - RCA Graduating Students Book Awards, RCA Final Degree Show
- 2000 - RCA Sheila Robinson Drawing Prize
- 2001&2002 - Contemporary Decorative Arts Exhibition, Sotheby's
- 2004 - BookTrust Newcomer - for A Lovely Day for Amelia Goose
- 2008 - American Library Association (ALA) - Notable Children's Book - for Tracks of a Panda
- 2013 - Biennial of Illustration Bratislava (BIB) - Golden Apple Award - for Free as a Cloud
- 2013 - China's 8th National Book Design Exhibition - Best book in children's book category - for Free as a Cloud
- 2013 - Shanghai International Children's Bookfair Golden Pinwheel Awards Grand Jury Prize and Reader's Choice Prize - for Free as a Cloud
- 2013 - China's Most Beautiful Book - for Free as a Cloud
- 2013 - The 8th National Book Design Exhibition, Best Book in Children's Book Category - for Free as a Cloud
- 2015 - Chen Bochui International Children's Literature Award - best picture book - for Smoke
- 2015 - Chinese Original Picture Books Top 10 - first prize - for Summer
- 2016 - Serbia International Bookfair - Illustration Award - for Smoke
- 2016 - Shenzhen Children's Library Top 10 My Favorite Children's Books - for Summer
- 2016 - The White Ravens selection of International Children's and Youth Literature - for Summer
- 2017 - Nami Island International Picture Book Illustration Concours 2017 Purple Island Award - for Smoke
- 2017 - Image of the Book, Best Illustration Moscow - for I am Hua Mulan
- 2017 - Chinese Original Picture Books Top 10 - first prize - for I am Hua Mulan
- 2018 - The Ninth National Book Design Exhibition - for Summer
- 2018 - Chinese Picture Book Time Award Golden Prize - for I am Hua Mulan
- 2018 - The Ninth National Book Design Exhibition, Children's Book Brown Award - for I am Hua Mulan
- 2019 - Chinese Original Picture Books Top 10 - for Li Na, Being a Better Me
- 2021 - Ten Best National Children's Books - for The Lost Child
- 2021 - IRead Best 100 Picture Books - for The Lost Child
- 2022 - The Seventeenth Wenjin Book Award, National Library - for Footprints
- 2022 - Kate Greenaway Medal shortlist - for Shu Lin's Grandpa
- 2022 - The White Ravens selection of International Children's and Youth Literature - for Bread Years
- 2022 - Xinhui Best Picture Books of the Year - for Have You Seen The Magpie?
- 2022 - IBBY Selection of Outstanding Books for Young People with Disabilities - for The Visible Sounds
- 2023 - Yoto Carnegie Medal for Illustration, shortlisted - for The Visible Sounds
- 2023 - UKLA Book Prize,

== Works ==
- A Lovely Day for Amelia Goose (2004)
- Tracks of a Panda, with Nick Dowson (2007)
- Smoke, with Cao Wenxuan, tr. Duncan Poupard 《烟》 (2015)
- Snowflake in My Pocket, with Rachel Bright (2016)
- Free as a Cloud, with Bai Bing 《云朵一样的八哥》 (2017)
- I am Hua Mulan, with Qin Wenjun 《我是花木兰》 (Reycraft, 2019)
- Summer, with Cao Wenxuan, tr. Yan Ding) 《夏天》 (Macmillan, 2019)
- Dou Dou the Panda series, with Gao Hongbo, Jin Bo and Bai Bing 《熊猫逗逗系列》 (2019)
- Sweet Snow series, with Tie Ning 《香雪系列》 (2020)
- Li Na, Being a Better Me, with A Jia 《李娜，做更好的自己》 (2020)
- Footprints, with Xue Tao) 《脚印》 (2020)
- Shulin's Grandpa, with Matt Goodfellow 《舒琳的外公》 (Otter-Barry, 2021)
- The Lost Child, with Jin Bo 《迷路的小孩》 (2021)
- The Visible Sounds. Picture book, with Yin Jianling, tr. Filip Selucky (UCLan, 2021) ISBN 9781912979790
- Rope, with Cao Wenxuan) 《绳子》 (2022)
- Have You Seen The Magpie?, with Dai Yun (2022)
