= Cai Gao (illustrator) =

Chinese children's book author (born 1946)

Cai Gao (Chinese: 蔡皋; born 1946) is a Chinese children’s book illustrator, author and editor. She was the first Chinese illustrator to win the Golden Apple Award at the Biennial of Illustration Bratislava and has twice been shortlisted for the Hans Christian Andersen Award.

Born in Changsha, Hunan province, she grew up in a three‑generation household as the eldest of five sisters, an upbringing that strongly influenced the family warmth and folk culture in her later work. After nearly twelve years teaching in a rural village in Hunan, she began contributing illustrations and covers to children’s magazines and published her first award‑winning book “The Beautiful Garden” in 1980. In 1982 she joined Hunan Children’s Publishing House as an editor, while continuing to illustrate. She became an important advocate for original Chinese picture books at a time when translated titles dominated the market.

Cai is best known for picture books that adapt Chinese folklore and classical literature, including “Bao’er, The Fox Spirit in the Abandoned Garden”, “The Story of Peach Blossom Spring”, and collections of folk tales from China, Korea, and Japan. Her illustrations draw on classical Chinese ink painting, folk art motifs, and impressionistic color to depict rural life, traditional festivals, and the relationship between humans and nature.

== Awards and honours ==
- 2026 - winner of the Hans Christian Andersen Award
- 2024 - shortlisted for the Hans Christian Andersen Award
- 2022 - Chen Bochui International Children's Literature Award
- 1993 - received the Golden Apple Award at the Biennial of Illustration Bratislava for “Bao’er, The Fox Spirit in the Abandoned Garden”

== Books (as author-illustrator) ==
Cai has also illustrated and edited numerous other picture books.

- 2024 - What Would It Be Like Without? (不能没有)
- 2023 - The Magic Leaf
- 2021 - The Land of Peach Blossom (桃花源的故事)
- 2020 - Once When I Was Little (6 vols)
- 2019 - Bao Er, the Fox Spirit in the Abandoned Garden (宝儿)
- 2018 - Each Seedling Has its Own Rainfall
- 2017 - Tan Hou and the Double Sixth Festival (晒龙袍的六月六) - English, tr. Helen Wang (Balestier Press, 2017, ISBN 9781911221036)
- 2016 - How I Came to Be Me (出生的故事) - English, translator not named (Starfish Bay Publishing, Australia, 2017, ISBN 978-1760361051)
- 2016 - What Can You See in the Moon
- 2015 - Three Monks
- 2013 - Blazing City (火城)
