= Vejjajiva =

Vejjajiva (Thai: เวชชาชีวะ) is a Thai surname. Notable people with the surname include:

- Abhisit Vejjajiva (born 1964), Thai politician and Prime Minister of Thailand
- Ngarmpun Vejjajiva (born 1962), Thai writer and translator
