= Book illustration =

Illustration which appears in books

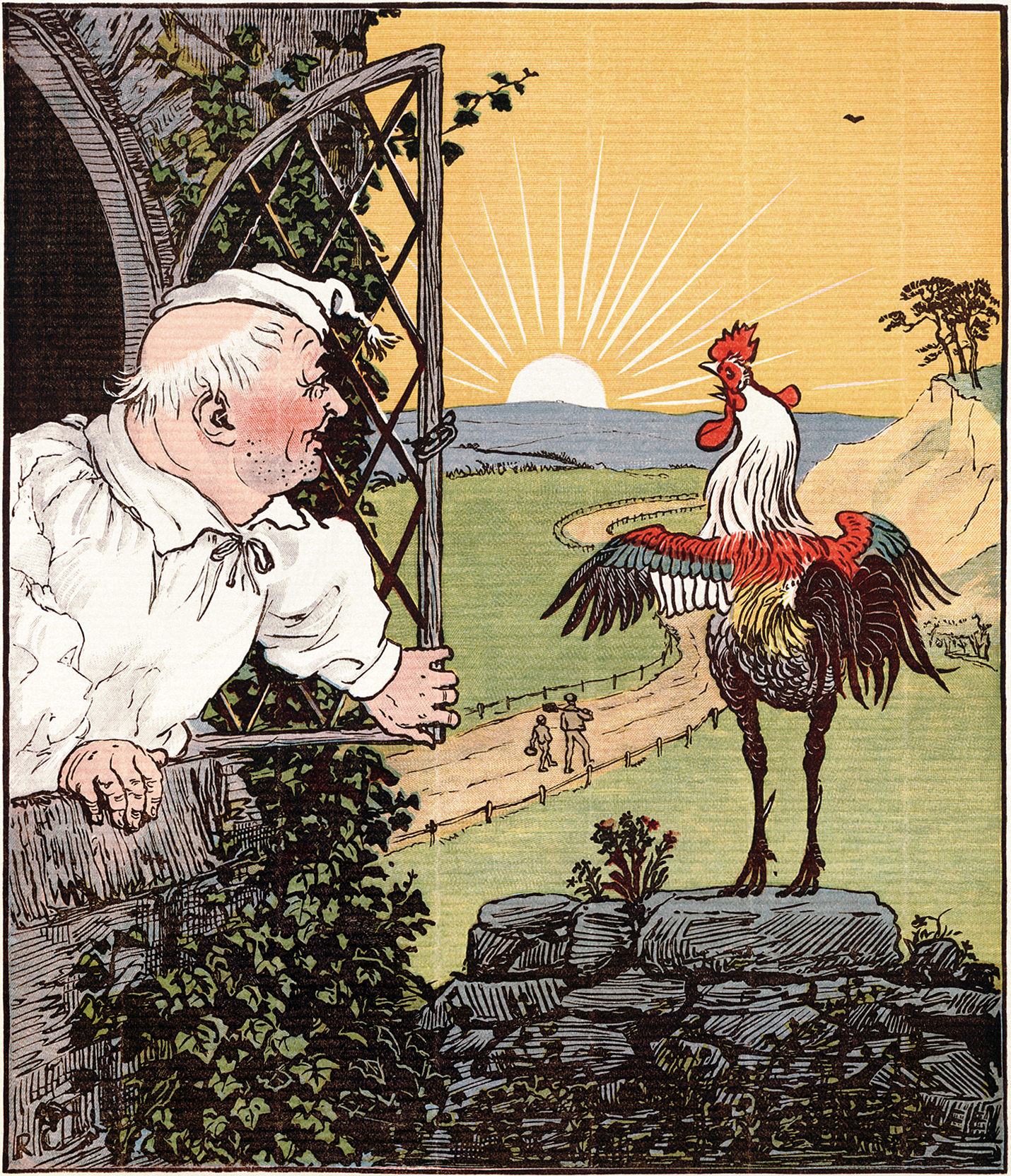
Illustration from "The House that Jack Built" in The Complete Collection of Pictures & Songs; engraving and printing by Edmund Evans, illustration by Randolph Caldecott (1887)

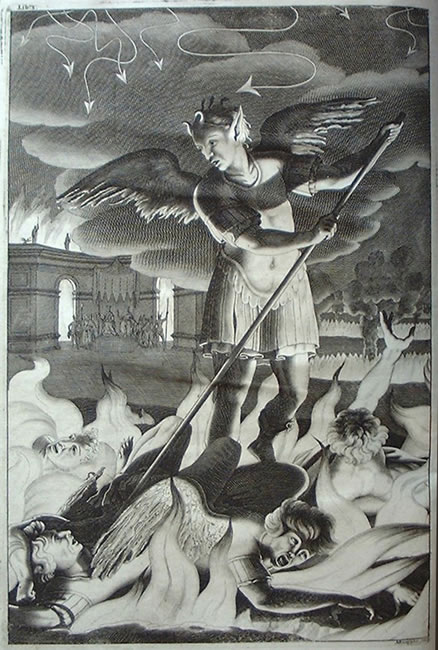
One of 12 illustrations in the 4th edition of Paradise Lost by John Milton, by John Baptist Medina, 1688

The illustration of manuscript books was well established in ancient times, and the tradition of the illuminated manuscript thrived in the West until the invention of printing. Other parts of the world had comparable traditions, such as the Persian miniature. Modern book illustration comes from the 15th-century woodcut illustrations that were fairly rapidly included in early printed books, and later block books. Other techniques such as engraving, etching, lithography and various kinds of colour printing were to expand the possibilities and were exploited by such masters as Daumier, Doré or Gavarni.

== History ==
Book illustration as we now know it evolved from early European woodblock printing. In the early 15th century, playing cards were created using block printing, which was the first use of prints in a sequenced and logical order. "The first known European block printings with a communications function were devotional prints of saints."

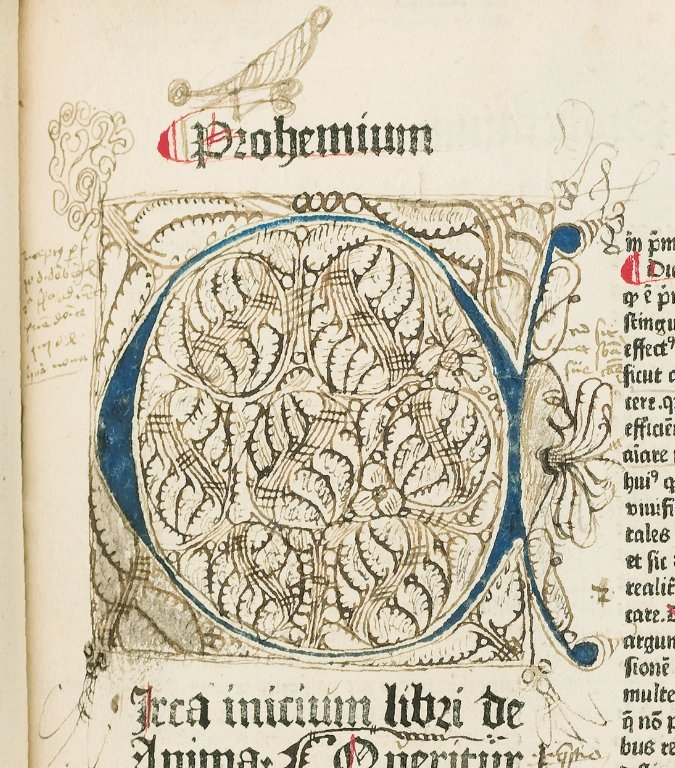
Illumination with doodles and drawings, including an open-mouthed human profile, with multiple tongues sticking out. Copulata, "De Anima", f. 2a. HMD Collection, WZ 230 M772c 1485.

As printing took off and books became common, printers began to use woodcuts to illustrate them. Hence, "centers for woodblock playing-card and religious-print production became centers for illustrated books. Printers of large early books often reused several times, and also had detachable "plugs" of figures, or the attributes of saints, which they could rearrange within a larger image to make several variations. Luxury books were for a few decades often printed with blank spaces for manual illumination in the old way.

Unlike later techniques, woodcut uses relief printing just as metal moveable type does, so that pages including both text and illustration can be set up and printed together. However the technique either gives rather crude results or was expensive if a high-quality block-cutter was used, and could only manage fine detail on atypically large pages. It was not suitable for the level of detail required for maps, for example, and the 1477 Bolognese edition of Ptolemy's Cosmographia was both the first book to contain printed maps and the first to be illustrated by engravings (by Taddeo Crivelli) rather than woodcuts. However hardly any further engraved illustrations were produced for several decades after about 1490, and instead a style of expensive books decorated in metalcut, mostly religious and produced in Paris, was a popular luxury product between about 1480 and 1540. In the middle of the 16th century woodcut was gradually overtaken by the intaglio printing techniques of engraving and etching which became dominant by about 1560–1590, first in Antwerp, then Germany, Switzerland and Italy, the important publishing centres. They remained so until the later 19th century. They required the illustrations to be printed separately, on a different type of printing press, so encouraging illustrations that took a whole page, which became the norm.

Engraving and etching gave sharper definition and finer detail to the illustrations, and rapidly became dominant by the late 15th century, often with the two techniques mixed together in a single plate. A wide range of books were now illustrated, initially mostly on a few pages, but with the number of illustrations gradually rising over the period, and tending to use more etching than engraving. Particular kinds of books such as scientific and technical works, children's books, and atlases now became very heavily illustrated, and from the mid-18th century many of the new form of the novel had a small number of illustrations.

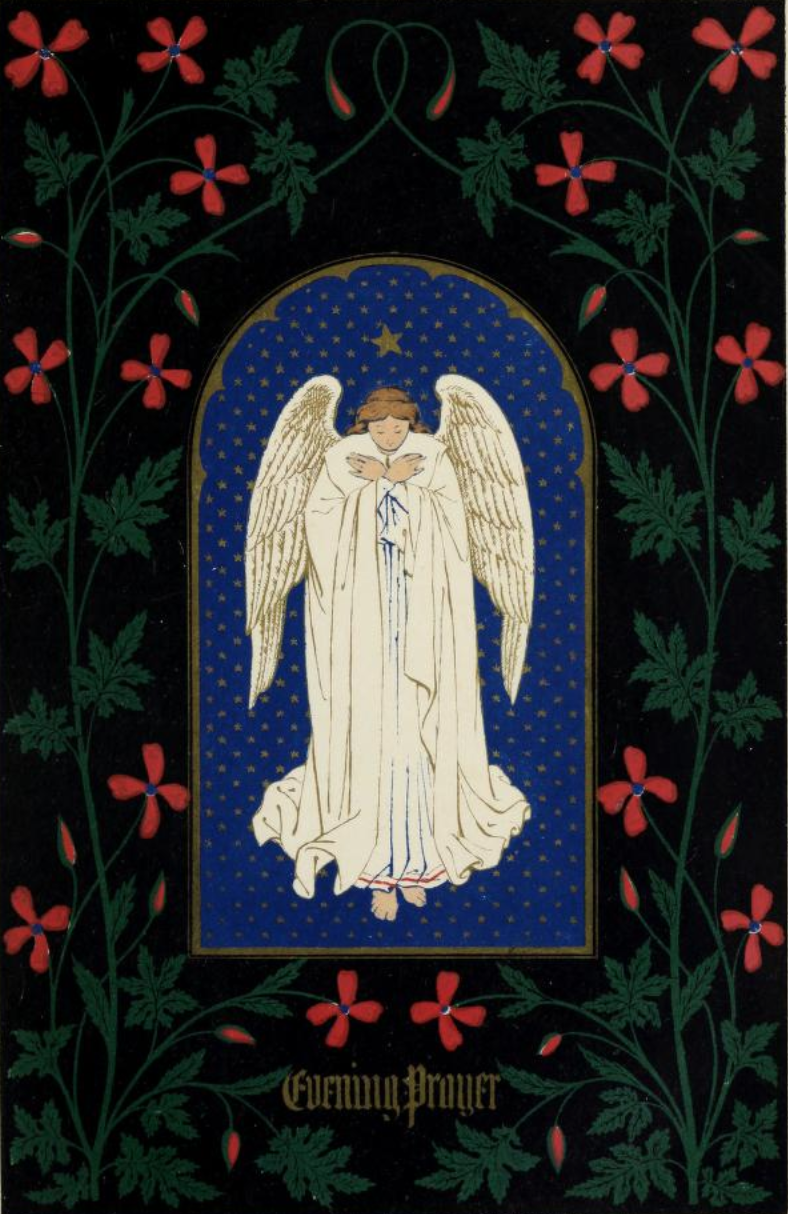
Illustration of "Evening Prayer" from the 1845 illuminated Book of Common Prayer, chromolithographed in blue, red, gold and green.

Luxury books on geographical topics and natural history, and some children's books, had printed illustrations which were then coloured by hand, but in Europe none of the experimental techniques for true colour printing became widely used before the mid-19th century, when several different techniques became successful. In East Asia colour printing with many different woodblocks was increasing widely used; the fully developed technique in Japan was called nishiki-e, and used in books as well as ukiyo-e prints.

Lithography (invented by Alois Senefelder in 1798 and made public in 1818) allowed for more textual variety and accuracy. This is because the artist could now draw directly on the printing plate itself.

New techniques developed in the nineteenth and twentieth centuries revolutionized book illustrations and put new resources at the disposal of artists and designers. In the early nineteenth century, the photogravure process allowed for photographs to be reproduced in books. In this process, light-sensitive gelatin was used to transfer the image to a metal plate, which would then be etched. Another process, chromolithography, which was developed in France in the mid-nineteenth century, permitted color printing. The process was extremely labor-intensive and expensive though as the artist would have to prepare a separate plate for each color used. In the late twentieth century, the process known as offset lithography made color printing cheaper and less-time consuming for the artist. The process used a chemical process to transfer a photographic negative to a rubber surface before printing.

There were various artistic movements and their proponents in the nineteenth and twentieth centuries that took an interest in the enrichment of book design and illustration. For example, Aubrey Beardsley, a proponent of both Art Nouveau and Aestheticism, had a great influence over book illustrations. Beardsley specialized in erotica and some of the best examples of his drawings were for the first English edition of Oscar Wilde's Salomé (1894).

== Contamination of historic books ==
In the 19th century, Paris green and similar arsenic pigments were often used on front and back covers, top, fore and bottom edges, title pages, book decorations, and in printed or manual colorations of illustrations of books. Since February 2024, several German libraries started to block public access to their stock of 19th century books to check for the degree of poisoning.

== See also ==
- Children's book illustration
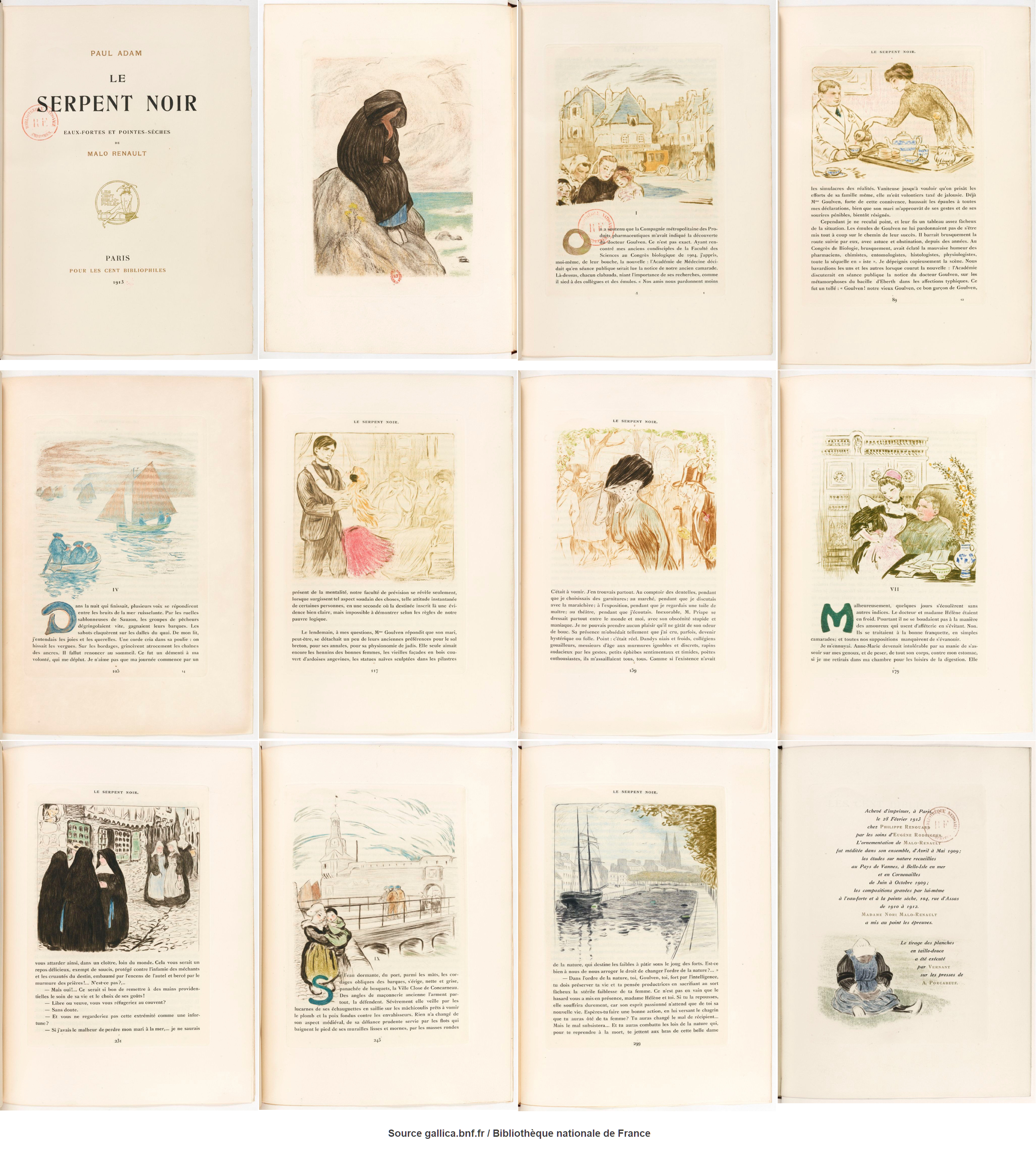
- Paul Adam (1862–1920), Le Serpent noir, 1910 à 1912 .illustrations Malo-Renault
  Illustration
- Extra-illustration
- Picture books
- Artist's book, works of art realized in the form of a book
- Bookbreaking
- Livre d'art, books in which the illustration holds a predominant place
