= Linda Yamane =

Indigenous American linguist, artist, and activist

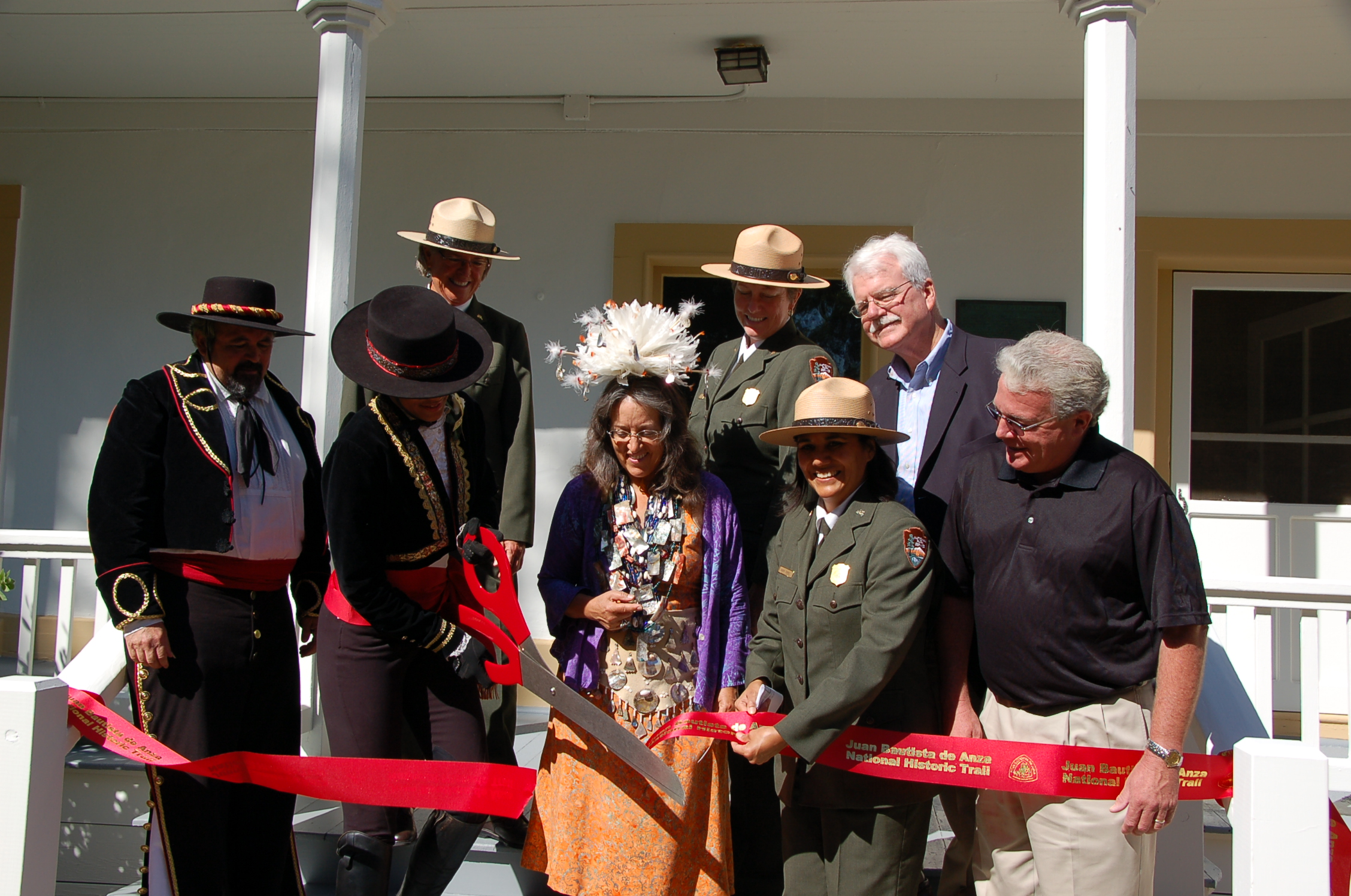
- Linda Yamane (center) at a ribbon-cutting ceremony in 2010 to celebrate the Grand Opening of the Martinez Adobe with Congressman George Miller
- Born: 1949 (age 76–77); San Jose, California, U.S.

Linda Yamane (born 1949) is an Rumsien Ohlone artist and historian who has reconstructed and "almost singlehandedly revived" the Rumsien language, basket-making methods, and other Rumsien traditions.

== Family life ==
Yamane was born in 1949 in San Jose, California. Yamane's grandmother, Beatrice Barcelona Reno—daughter of a Spanish-Basque father and a Rumsien-Spanish mother — lived with her family when she was young. By the time Yamane's grandmother had reached adulthood, scholars and the federal government had already declared the various peoples comprising the Ohlone extinct. Her grandmother was able to tell her stories reaching back to the late 1800s, and could teach her a bit about medicinal plant uses, but could not teach her about Rumsien culture.

As a result of her grandmother's stories, Yamane was able to trace her family back to the 1770s, including to Josef Manuel Higuera, one of the original settlers who planned the creation of San Jose, California's first Spanish civilian city, in 1777. Growing up, Yamane could also identify Margarita Maria, a woman from Tucutnut, the largest village of the Rumsien local tribe of the Carmel Valley, in the 1770s. She was given that name when baptized by priests at the mission in 1773. However, she had heard neither the term "Rumsien" nor "Ohlone" until she was in her 30s.

== Career ==
Yamane is a singer, painter, basket maker, writer, canoe builder, and expert on Rumsien games and the Rumsien language. She has worked as a graphic designer and an illustrator. Through her passion for researching her roots, she has developed substantial knowledge about Rumsien history and traditions. She partners with and consults many museums and other cultural institutions to help preserve and share knowledge of the Rumsien people and, more generally, of various Ohlone peoples. For example, in 2005 she worked with National Park Service ranger Naomi Torres and historian Paul Scolari to curate the exhibit Ohlone Portraits: Our Faces, Our Families, Our Stories at San Francisco's Crissy Field Center of the Golden Gate National Recreation Area and the Golden Gate National Parks Conservancy. Nineteen almost life-sized portraits from the late 19th and early 20th centuries appeared alongside biographies and smaller photos of those individuals' descendants. She creates art, such as the drawing of the tule dwelling that appears on interpretive signs in the Hillside Natural Area in El Cerrito, CA. She also created a large painting of a former village, Pruistac, for the Sanchez Adobe Park. For the past two decades, she has helped organize Ohlone Day in Henry Cowell Redwoods State Park.

=== Rumsien language ===
Because the last of the elders who spoke Rumsien died in the missions, knowledge of the language had died out before the start of the 20th century. Yamane's grandmother had told her some Rumsien names and other words, and told her many stories that came from the Rumsien tradition, but that was all.

In the mid-1980s, Yamane learned about the records of Smithsonian ethnographer John P. Harrington, collected in the 1930s. Harrington had worked with a Rumsien-English woman named Isabel Meadows and another Rumsien elder, Manuel Onesimo, to document the Rumsien language and Rumsien daily life and traditions. These notes were archived at the Smithsonian and available at some universities on microfilm. However, they were written in an old, highly localized dialect of Spanish, and Yamane was not able to decode them. She and Alex Ramirez, Onesimo's grandson, began working together on translating the documents. The translations into English marked the first time English speakers could learn about many aspects of Rumsien life.

In the course of this research, Yamane found several Rumsien creation stories and decided to write a book for children. She published When the World Ended: How Hummingbird Got Fire; How People Were Made: Rumsien Ohlone Stories in 1995.

Through this translation project, she also met scholar Sandy Lydon, with whom she has collaborated since the 1980s. They check each other's theories and assumptions in their work on the Rumsien people.

In 1992, while participating in a weeklong "Breath of Life" workshop at University of California, Berkeley, Yamane discovered additional Rumsien vocabulary relating to types of baskets and other tools used in daily life. The Breath of Life program, founded by linguist Leanne Hinton, pairs linguists with indigenous individuals want to revive their ancestral languages.

Yamane also discovered records at UC-Berkeley's Hearst Museum. This time, they were wax-cylinder recordings that anthropologist Alfred Kroeber made in the early 20th century. The recordings were of Elders Viviana Soto and Jacinta Gonzales singing traditional songs and telling stories in Rumsien. Using a cassette tape of the recordings, Yamane painstakingly transcribed them. She started matching up what was on the cylinders and what her grandmother had told her. First, she reconstructed stories, and then a good portion of the language. From those recordings, she was able to hear pronunciations and fill out her dictionary even further.

Thus, Yamane became the first speaker of the language since the last speaker had died in 1939.

==== Music ====
Yamane has used songs from Kroeber's recordings to reconstruct them and share them with others.

=== Basketry ===
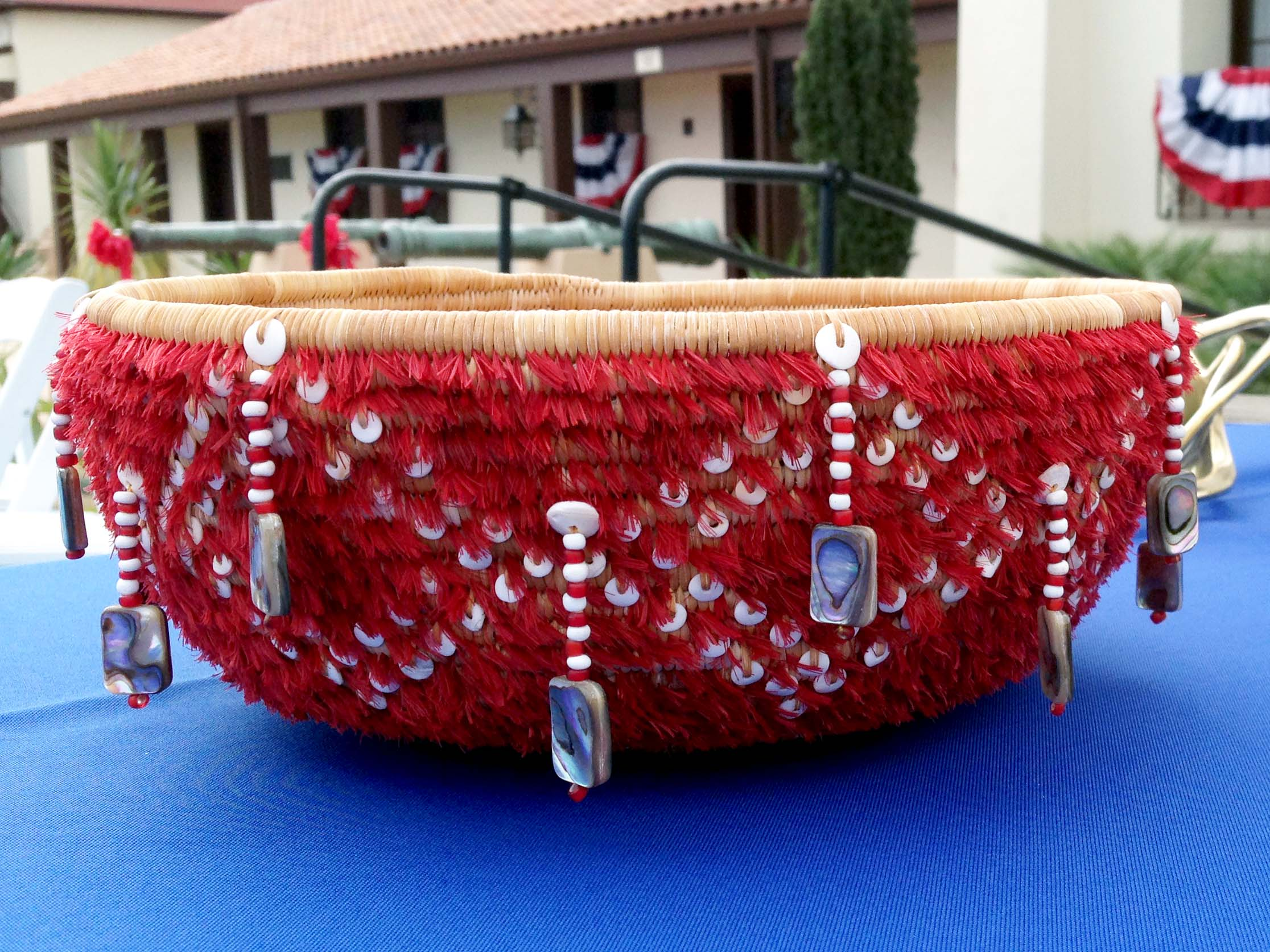
One of Yamane's traditionally styled baskets, now belonging to the Presidio Officers' Club collection.

In Rumsien tradition, it was customary to burn an individual's personal creations upon their death. Combined with the need to trade for supplies after Spanish colonialists began moving the Rumsien people into missions and the destruction of their possessions to force them into those missions, only an estimated 40 Rumsien baskets remained worldwide by the 1980s. Essentially, the Rumsien people stopped making traditional Olivella baskets when European colonialists came to the region. The techniques and style were lost, as no Rumsien basketmakers survived. Yamane learned some very basic techniques in basketmaking, not specifically from indigenous methodologies, in the 1970s, but it was another ten years before she studied an indigenous method of basketmaking from women of the Pomo tribe. She visited museums in California, as well as the Smithsonian, the American Museum of Natural History, the Musée du Quai Branly, and the British Museum, all of which had Rumsien baskets in their collections. Yamane thought of these baskets as her "teachers." She took notes and photographs, and described counting "the number of stitches per inch, coils per inch...." She read notes of ethnographers who had taken an interest in her tribe's basketmaking traditions. She follows the methods and inspiration of the baskets she observed and uses the same or similar materials, but creates her own designs. By the mid-1990s she began making her own baskets. She estimates that most baskets take her 2,500-3,000 hours to complete.

Another challenge was finding traditional materials. Yamane started growing a garden at home to have the supplies she needed. She also made agreements with the Bureau of Land Management to collect sedge and other materials from public lands in her region. Even once it is harvested, the willow, sedge, and other materials she uses may take months or years to dry and go through proper preparation for weaving.

Yamane has been a member of the California Indian Basketweavers Association since its founding in 1991. She was the co-editor of the organization's periodical: Roots and Shoots. In addition to her work with CIBA, through the Alliance for California Traditional Arts she took on Carol Bachman as an apprentice. Bachman learned both basketweaving and the related art of boat making from Yamane.

==== Boat making ====
Using many of the same skills as basket weaving, Yamane builds tule boats. These boats are called kónon in the Rumsien language. She first learned to make them in the 1980s, when she photographed and took notes on the process at a Coyote Hills Regional Park event in Fremont, CA. It was nearly 20 years for nearly 20 more years, but since the early 2000s she has made dozens of them. She created one of her early the boats for the Monterey History & Art Association's Maritime Museum, and they took it out on the Monterey Bay, possibly the first tule boat on the bay in over 150 years. Yamane and Bachman worked together with Cheryl Carter to build the boat.

==== Olivella baskets ====
Named for the decorative, sequin-like beads made from shells of the Olivella snails found at low tide off the coast of central California that defined them, these baskets had not been made in 150 or more years. The process of making each bead is laborious: collecting shells, baking them, cutting, shaping, and smoothing them. Each bead takes approximately 10 minutes to make, and about 3 in 4 stay whole throughout the process. A large basket might use several thousand olivella beads.

To even see such baskets, Yamane had to travel to the East Coast of the United States and in Europe; no known examples remained in California.

=== Jewelry making ===
Yamane also makes jewelry, particularly from abalone shells. Since they are hard to get and abalone are increasingly rare in the ocean, Yamane reached out to friends and divers to build a large collection of the shells. She then opened an abalone-shell "bank" for other indigenous artists who want to create traditional art with the shells.

=== Select commissioned works ===
2009 - Creative Work Fund grant to make one Ohlone presentation basket in collaboration with the Big Sur Land Trust. In 2021, artist Susanne Takehara created a mosaic, Weaving Past & Present, representing the basket on the exterior of an apartment building in East Oakland, in partnership with the EastSide Arts Alliance.

2010 - The Oakland Museum was organizing a new exhibit of baskets from the various indigenous peoples of California, and found they had no baskets from any of the Ohlone tribes that once populated the broader San Francisco Bay Area. Yamane had been a member of the museum's Native Advisory Council and had actually served as a consultant on the basket collection. The museum commissioned her to make a ceremonial basket in the Rumsien style and by Rumsien methods, which was unveiled to the public in 2012. The piece had over 20,000 stitches and 1,200 Olivella beads made by Yamane. The several thousand feathers on the basket were chicken feathers dyed red, because it is no longer legal to collect feathers from the acorn woodpecker, the traditional source. In addition, Yamane led multiple living history basket weaving demonstrations at the museum.

== Select publications ==
- When the World Ended: How Hummingbird Got Fire; How People Were Made: Rumsien Ohlone Stories (1995) - recipient of a 1995 Aesop Accolades.
- Weaving a California Tradition: A Native American Basketmaker (1996)
- A Gathering of Voices: The Native peoples of the Central California Coast (editor; 2002)
- The Dirt is Red Here: Art and Poetry from Native California (contributor; 2002)
