= Xie Qianni =

Chinese children's writer

Xie Qianni (谢倩霓) is a prizewinning Chinese writer, best known for writing children's books.

== Biography ==
Xie Qianni was born in Xiushui County, in Jiangxi province, China, in 1968. She graduated from the Chinese Dept at Nanjing University in 1989. She has been the editor-in-chief of a literary journal for young people, Shaonian wenyi 《少年文艺》. She is a member of the China Writers Association, and the Shanghai Writers Association.

== Honours and awards ==
Xie Qianni has been awarded many of the major children's literature prizes in China, including the National Outstanding Children's Literature Award (China) (全国优秀儿童文学奖), the Chen Bochui Children's Literature Award (陈伯吹儿童文学奖), and the Bing Xin Children's Literature Award.

== Publications ==
The following is a selection of Xie Qianni's works:

- 《你是我的城》You are my city (also known as Waiting for You (等你))
- 《晚霞中的红蜻蜓》 Red Dragonfly in the Evening Haze
- 《梦中的橄榄树》 Dreaming of Olive Trees
- 《青春潘多拉》 Youth Pandora
- 《此情可待》 This Feeling can Wait
- 《喜欢不是罪》 Love is Not a Crime
- 《多味毕业班》 Just think of this graduating class - English translation by Shi Gengshan (ABC Garden LLC, Rockville, MD, 2012)
