= Aesop Prize and Aesop Accolades =

Literary award

The Aesop Prize and Aesop Accolades are literary awards conferred annually by the Children's Folklore Section of the American Folklore Society upon English language books for children and young adults, both fiction and nonfiction.

== About the prize ==
The Prize and the Accolades are for books published in the previous two years. Winners are announced at the annual meeting of the American Folklore Society each October. The Prize was first awarded in 1992. The Accolades were first awarded in 1993.

== Prize review criteria ==
- Folklore should be central to the book's content and, if appropriate, to its illustrations.
- The folklore presented in the book should accurately reflect the culture and worldview of the people whose folklore is the focus of the book.
- The reader's understanding of folklore should be enhanced by the book, as should the book be enhanced by the presence of folklore.
- The book should reflect the high artistic standards of the best of children's literature and have strong appeal to the child reader.
- Folklore sources must be fully acknowledged and annotations referenced within the bound contents of the publication.

== Recipients of the prize and accolades ==
2023 Aesop Prize

- The Real Dada Mother Goose: A Treasury of Complete Nonsense. Written by Jon Scieszka. Illustrated by Julia Rothman. Candlewick. 2022.

2023 Aesop Accolades

- Nine Color Deer. Written and illustrated by Kailin Duan. Translated by Jeremy Tiang. Levine Querido. 2022.
- Ancient Night. Written by David Bowles. Illustrated by David Alvarez. Levine Querido. 2023.

2022 Aesop Prize

- Blancaflor, The Hero with Secret Powers: A Folktale from Latin America. Written by Nadja Spiegelman. Illustrated by Sergio García Sánchez. Toon Books and Toon Graphics. 2021.
- A Bedtime Full of Stories: 50 Folk Tales and Legends from Around the World. Written by Angela McAllister. Illustrated by Anna Shepeta. Frances Lincoln Children's Books. 2021.

2022 Aesop Accolades

- The Man of the Moon: And Other Stories from Greenland. Retold by Gunvor Bjerre. illustrated by Miki Jacobsen. Translated from Danish by Charlotte Barslund. Inhabit Media. 2021.
- Across the Rainbow Bridge: Stories of Norse Gods and Humans. Written by Kevin Crossley-Holland. Illustrated by Jeffrey Alan Love. Candlewick Studio. 2021.

2021 Aesop Prize

- Feathered Serpent and the Five Suns: A Mesoamerican Creation Myth. Written and Illustrated by Duncan Tonatiuh. Abrams Books for Young Readers.

2021 Aesop Accolades

- The Shaman's Apprentice. By Zacharias Kunuk. Illustrated by Megan Kyak-Monteith. Inhabit Media Inc. ISBN 978-1-77227-268-0.
- The Book of Secrets. Written and Illustrated by Mat Tonti, Color work by Dan Siber. Kar-Ben Publishing.
- El Cucuy is Scared, Too! By Donna Barba Higuera. Illustrated by Juliana Perdomo. Abrams Books, 2021.

2020 Aesop Prize

- The Fabled Life of Aesop, by Ian Lendler. Illustrated by Pamela Zagarenski (Boston: Houghton Mifflin Harcourt, 2020)

2020 Aesop Accolades

- Under the Cottonwood Tree: El Susto de la Curandera, by Paul and Carlos Meyer. Art by Margaret Hardy (Los Angeles: North Fourth Publications, 2019)
- Lola: A Ghost Story, by J. Torres. Illustrated by Elbert Or (Portland: Oni Press Publication, 2020)
- The Moose of Ewenki, by Gerelchimeg Blackcrane. Illustrated by Jiu Er. Translated by Helen Mixter (Vancouver: Greystone Kids, 2020)
- A World of Spooky Stories: 50 Tales to Make your Spine Tingle, by Angela McAllister. Illustrated by Madalina Andronic (London: Frances Lincoln Children's Books, 2019)

2019 Aesop Prizes

- Peg Bearskin, as told by Mrs. Elizabeth Brewer. Adapted by Philip Dinn and Andy Jones. Illustrated by Denise Gallagher (Newfoundland: Running the Goat Books & Broadsides Inc., 2019)
- Raisins and Almonds: A Yiddish Lullaby, by Susan Tarcov. Illustrated by Sonia Sánchez (Minneapolis: Kar-Ben Publishing, 2019)

2019 Aesop Accolades

- Honu and Moa, by Edna Cabcabin Moran (Kane'ohe: BeachHouse Publishing, 2018)
- Takaanaaluk, by Herve Paniaq. Illustrated by Germaine Arnaktauyok (Iqaluit: Inhabit Media Inc., 2018)
- Riding a Donkey Backwards: Wise and Foolish Tales of Mulla Nasruddin, retold by Sean Taylor and the Khayaal Theatre. Illustrated by Shirin Adl (Somerville: Candlewick Press, 2018)

2018 Aesop Prize

- The Dragon Slayer: Folktales from Latin America, by Jaime Hernandez. Illustrated by F. Isabel Campoy (New York: Toon Books, 2017)

2018 Aesop Accolades

- Spirited Away: Fairy Stories of Old Newfoundland, by Tom Dawe. Illustrated by Veselina Tomova (Newfoundland: Running the Goat Books & Broadsides Inc., 2017)
- Muskrat and Skunk: A Lakota Drum Story, retold and illustrated by Donald F. Montileaux (Pierre: South Dakota Historical Society Press, 2017)
- Norse Myths: Tales of Odin, Thor, and Loki, by Kevin Crossley-Holland. Illustrated by Jeffrey Alan Love (Somerville: Candlewick Studio, 2017)
- Wordwings, by Sydelle Pearl (Toronto: Guernica Editions, 2017)

2017 Aesop Prize

- Noodleheads See the Future, by Tedd Arnold, Martha Hamilton, and Mitch Weiss. Illustrated by Tedd Arnold (New York: Holiday House, 2017)

2017 Aesop Accolades

- The Secret of the Kelpie, retold by Lari Don and Illustrated by Phillip Longson (Edinburgh: Floris Books, 2016)
- The Wishing Foxes, by Margaret REad MacDonlad. Illustrated by Kitty Harvill with Jen Whitman and Nat Whitman (New Orleans: Plum Street Publishers, 2017)
- Yokki and the Parno Gry. by Richard O'Neill and Catherine Quarmby. Illustrated by Miarieke Nelissen (Swindon: Child's Play, 2017)

2016 Aesop Prizes

- Lowriders to the Center of the Earth, by Cathy Camper and Raúl the Third (San Francisco: Chronicle Books, 2016)
- I Am Pan!, by Mordecai Gerstein (New York: Roaring Brook Press, 2016)

2016 Aesop Accolades

- The Princess and the Warrior, by Duncan Tonatiuh (New York: Abrams, 2016)
- The Storyteller, Evan Turk (New York: Atheneum Books for Young Readers, 2016)

2015 Aesop Prize

- West of the Moon, by Margi Preus (New York: Amulet Books, 2014)
- Percy Jackson's Greek Heroes, by Rick Riordan, illustr. by John Rocco (New York: Disney/Hyperion, 2015)

2015 Aesop Accolades

- Tree Matters, by Gangu Bai, V. Geetha and Gita Wolf (Tara Books Private Limited, 2014)
- My Grandfather's Coat, by Jim Aylesworth and Barbara McClintock (Scholastic Press, 2014)
- The Legend of the Beaver's Tail, by Stephanie Shaw (Ann Arbor: Sleeping Bear Press, 2015)

2014 Aesop Prize

- Chinese Fables: “The Dragon Slayer” and Other Timeless Tales of Wisdom, by Shiho S. Nunes (Tokyo/Rutland, Vermont: Tuttle Publishing, 2013)

2014 Aesop Accolades

- Never Say a Mean Word Again: A Tale from Medieval Spain, by Jacqueline Jules (Bloomington, Indiana: Wisdom Tales Press, 2014)
- We Shall Overcome: The Story of a Song, by Debbie Levy (New York: Disney Jump At the Sun, 2013)
- Tasunka: A Lakota Horse Legend, by Donald Montileaux (Pierre, SD: South Dakota State Historical Society Press)
- Gobble you up!, by Gita Wolf (Berkeley, CA: Publishers Group West: Tara Books, 2013)

2013 Aesop Prize

- Looks Like Daylight, by Deborah Ellis (Toronto: Groundwood Books, 2013)

2013 Aesop Accolades

- Written in Stone, by Rosanne Parry (New York, New York, Random House, 2013)
- Nasreddine, by Odile Weulersse, illustr. by Rébecca Dautremer (Grand Rapids, MI: Eerdmans Books for Young Readers, 2013)
- Whiskers, Tails & Wings: Animal Folktales from Mexico, by Judy Goldman, illustr. by Fabricio VandenBroeck (Watertown, MA: Charlesbridge, 2013)

2012 Aesop Prize

- Which Side Are You On?, by George Ella Lyon, illustr. by Christopher Cardinale (El Paso, TX: Cinco Puntos Press, 2011)

2012 Aesop Accolades

- Mouse & Lion, by Rand Burkert, illustr. by Nancy Ekholm Burkert (New York: Michael di Capua/Scholastic, 2011)
- The Matatu, by Eric Waters, illustr. by Eva Campbell (Victoria, BC: Orca 2012)
- Walking on Earth & Touching the Sky: Poetry and Prose by Lakota Youth at Red Cloud Indian School, by Timothy P. McLaughlin, illustr. by S.D. Nelson (New York: Abrams, 2012)

2011 Aesop Prize

- Trickster: Native American Tales, A Graphic Collection, ed. by Matt Dembicki (Golden, CO: Fulcrum Books, 2010)

2011 Aesop Accolades

- Odetta: The Queen of Folk, by Stephen Alcorn and Samantha Thornhill (New York: Scholastic, 2010)
- The Arabian Nights, by Wafa’ Tarnowska, illustr. by Carole Hénaff (Cambridge, MA: Barefoot Books, 2010)
- It's Not About the Rose!, by Veronika Martenova Charles, illustr. by David Parkins (Plattsburgh, NY: Tundra Books, 2010)
- It's Not About the Crumbs!, by Veronika Martenova Charles, illustr. by David Parkins (Plattsburgh, NY: Tundra Books, 2010)
- It's Not About the Pumpkin!, by Veronika Martenova Charles, illustr. by David Parkins (Plattsburgh, NY: Tundra Books, 2010)
- It's Not About the Hunter!, by Veronika Martenova Charles, illustr. by David Parkins (Plattsburgh, NY: Tundra Books, 2010)
- It's Not About the Apple!, by Veronika Martenova Charles, illustr. by David Parkins (Plattsburgh, NY: Tundra Books, 2010)

2010 Aesop Prize

- Joha Makes a Wish: A Middle Eastern Tale, adapted by Eric A. Kimmel, illustr. by Omar Rayyan (Marshall Cavendish Children, 2010)

2010 Aesop Accolades

- Cloud Tea Monkeys, by Mal Peet and Elspeth Graham, illustr. by Juan Wijngaard (Candlewick Press, 2009)
- Firebird, retold by Saviour Pirotta, illustr. by Catherine Hyde (Templar Books, an imprint of Candlewick Press, 2010)

2009 Aesop Prize

- Dance, Nana, Dance (Baila, Nana, Baila), by Joe Hayes, illustr. by Mauricio Trenard Sayago (Cinco Puntos Press, 2008)
- The Kalevala: Tales of Magic and Adventure, adapted by Kirsti Mäkinen, illustrated by Pirkko-Liisa Surojegin, transl. by Kaarina Brooks (Simply Read Books, 2009)
- Naupaka, by Nona Beamer, illustr. by Caren Ke’ala Loebel-Fried, transl. from the Hawai’ian by Kaliko Beamer-Trapp, music by Keola Beamer (Bishop Museum Press, 2008) (Includes audio CD).

2009 Aesop Accolades

- The Barefoot Book of Earth Tales, by Dawn Casey, illustr. by Anne Wilson (Barefoot Books, 2009)
- Jack Tales and Mountain Yarns as told by Orville Hicks, transcription and text by Julia Taylor Ebel, illustr. by Sherry Jenkins Jensen (Parkway Publishers, Inc. 2009)
- Polish Folktales and Folklore, by Michal Malinowski and Anne Pellowski (Libraries Unlimited, 2009)
- Princess Peacock, Tales from the Other Peoples of China, by Haiwang Yuan (World Folklore Series, Libraries Unlimited, 2008)
- Tsunami!, by Kimiko Kajikawa, illustr. by Ed Young (Phiomel Books, 2009)

2009 Special Recognition - given to Libraries Unlimited for their scholarly efforts in compiling the comprehensive World Folklore Series.

2008 Aesop Prize

- Ain’t Nothing But a Man: My Quest to Find the Real John Henry, by Scott Reynolds Nelson, with Marc Aronson (National Geographic, 2008)

2008 Aesop Accolades

- Dance in a Buffalo Skull, told by Zitkala-Ša, illustr. by S. D. Nelson (Prairie Tales Series, no. 2. South Dakota State Historical Society Press, 2007)
- The Adventures of Molly Whuppie and Other Appalachian Folktales, by Anne Shelby, illustrated by Paula McArdle (University of North Carolina Press, 2007)

2007 Aesop Prize

- Lugalbanda: The Boy Who Got Caught Up In a War, told by Kathy Henderson, illustrated by Jane Ray (Candlewick, 2006)
- The Legend of Hong Kil Dong: the Robin Hood of Korea, retold by Anne Sibley O'Brien (Charlesbridge, 2006)

2007 Aesop Accolades

- Solomon and the Ant and Other Jewish Folktales, retold by Sheldon Oberman. Introduction and commentary by Peninnah Schram (Boyds Mills Press, 2006)
- Tatanka and the Lakota People: A Creation Story, illustrated by Donald F. Montileaux (South Dakota State Historical Press, 2006)

2006 Aesop Prize

- Malian's Song. By Marge Bruchac, illustrated by William Maughan. Middlebury, Vermont: Vermont Folklife Center, 2005.
- Outfoxing Fear: Folktales From Around the World. Edited by Kathleen Ragan. New York: W.W. Norton, 2006.

2006 Aesop Accolades

- Chál tó yinílo‘: Frog Brings Rain. By Patricia Hruby Powell. Flagstaff, Arizona: Salina Bookshelf, 2006.
- Brazilian Folktales. By Livia de Almeida and Ana Portella, edited by Margaret Read MacDonald. Westport, Connecticut: Libraries Unlimited, 2006.

2005 Aesop Prize

- From the Winds of Manguito: Cuban Folktales in English and Spanish. Retold by Elvia Pérez. Edited by Margaret Read MacDonald. Translated by Paula Martin. Illustrated by VÍctor Francisco Hernández Mora. Westport, Connecticut: Libraries Unlimited, 2004.
- Roy Makes a Car. By Mary E. Lyons. Illustrated by Terry Widener. New York: Atheneum, 2005.

2005 Aesop Accolades

- The Flying Canoe. Retold by Roch Carrier. Translated by Sheila Fischman. Illustrated by Sheldon Cohen. Toronto, Ontario, Canada: Tundra Books, 2004.
- Grandma Lena's Big Ol' Turnip. By Denia Lewis Hester. Illustrated by Jackie Urbanovic. Morton Grove, Illinois: Albert Whitman and Company, 2005.
- The Minister's Daughter. By Julie Hearn. New York and London: Atheneum, 2005.

2004 Aesop Prize

- Ayat Jamilah: Beautiful Signs: A Treasury of Islamic Wisdom for Children and Parents. Collected and adapted by Sarah Conover and Freda Crane. Illustrated by Valerie Wahl. Spokane, Washington: Eastern Washington University Press, 2004.
- The Magic Gourd. Written and illustrated by Baba Wagué Diakité. New York: Scholastic Press, 2003.

2004 Aesop Accolades

- Bottle Houses:The Creative World of Grandma Prisbrey. Written by Melissa Eskridge Slaymaker. Illustrated by Julie Paschkis. New York: Henry Holt, 2004.
- The Painted Wall and Other Strange Tales. Selected and adapted by Michael Bedard from the Liao-Chai of Pu Sung-ling. Toronto: Tundra Books, 2003.
- Sure as Sunrise: Stories of Bruh Rabbit & His Walkin’ Talkin’ Friends. Written by Alice McGill. Illustrated by Don Tate. Boston: Houghton Mifflin, 2004.
- Walking on Solid Ground. By Shu Pui Cheung, Shuyuan Li, Aaron Chau and Deborah Wei. Philadelphia: Philadelphia Folklore Project, 2004.

2003 Aesop Prize

- Horse Hooves and Chicken Feet: Mexican Folktales. Selected by Neil Philip. Illustrated by Jacqueline Mair. New York: Clarion Books, 2003.
- Mightier Than the Sword: World Folktales for Strong Boys. Collected and told by Jane Yolen. Illustrated by Raul Colon. San Diego: Silver Whistle/ Harcourt, Inc., 2003.

2003 Aesop Accolades

- Invisible Kingdoms: Jewish Tales of Angels, Spirits, and Demons. Retold by Howard Schwartz, illustrated by Stephen Fieser. New York: HarperCollins, 2002.
- Nelson Mandela's Favorite African Folktales. [written and illustrated by various hands] New York: W. W. Norton, 2002.
- Pajaro Verde: The Green Bird By Joe Hayes, illustrated by Antonio Castro L. El Paso, TX: Cinco Puntos, 2002.
- Something for Nothing. By Ann Redisch Stampler, illustrated by Jacqueline M. Cohen. New York: Clarion Books, 2003.
- The Sun, the Rain, and the Apple Seed: A Novel of Johnny Appleseed's Life. By Lynda Durrant. New York: Clarion Books, 2003.
- Yonder Mountain: A Cherokee Legend. Told by Robert H. Bushyhead, written by Kay Thorpe Bannon, illustrated by Kristina Rodana. New York: Marshall Cavendish, 2002.

2002 Aesop Prize

- Can You Guess My Name? Traditional Tales Around the World. Selected and retold by Judy Sierra. Illustrated by Stefano Vitale. Clarion Books, 2002.
- One Time Dog Market at Buda and Other Hungarian Folktales. Translated and retold by Irma Molnér. Illustrations by Georgeta-Elena Enesel. Linnet Books, 2001.

2002 Aesop Accolades

- Head, Body, Legs: A Story from Liberia. Retold by Won-Ldy Paye and Margaret H. Lippert. Illustrated by Julie Pashkis. Henry Holt, 2002.
- The Race of the Birkebeiners. Written by Lise Lunge-Larsen. Illustrated by Mary Azarian. Houghton Mifflin, 2001.
- Shakespeare's Storybook: Folk Tales That Inspired the Bard. Retold by Patrick Ryan. Illustrated by James Mayhew. Barefoot Books, 2001.

2001 Aesop Prize

- Fiesta Feminina. Celebrating Women in Mexican Folktale. Retold by Mary-Joan Gerson. Illustrated by Maya Christina Gonzalez. Barefoot Books, 2001.

2001 Aesop Accolades

- Mabela the Clever. Retold by Margaret Read MacDonald. Illustrated by Tim Coffey. Albert Whitman, 2001.
- Daisy and the Doll. By Michael Medearis and Angela Shelf Medearis. Paintings by Larry Johnson. Vermont Folklife Center, 2001.

2000 Aesop Prize

- The Day the Rabbi Disappeared: Jewish Holiday Tales of Magic. Text by Howard Schwartz. Illustrations by Monique Passicot. Viking, 2000.

2000 Aesop Accolades

- The Hunter: A Chinese Folktale. Text by Mary Casanova. Illustrations by Ed Young. Atheneum, 2000.
- In the Hollow of Your Hand: Slave Lullabies. Text by Alice McGill. Illustrations by Michael Cummings. Houghton, Mifflin, 2000.
- Stockings of Buttermilk: American Folktales. Text by Neil Philip. Illustrations by Jacqueline Mair. Clarion, 1999.

1999 Aesop Prize

- King Solomon And His Magic Ring. Text by Elie Wiesel. Illustrations by Mark Podwal. Greenwillow, 1999.
- Trickster And The Fainting Birds. Text by Howard Norman. Illustrations by Tom Pohrt. Harcourt Brace, 1999.

1999 Aesop Accolades

- The Deetkatoo: Native American Stories About Little People. Text by John Bierhorst. Illustrations by Ron Hilbert Coy. William Morrow, 1998.
- The Donkey And The Rock. Text and illustrations by Demi. Henry Holt, 1999.
- The Hatseller And The Monkeys. Text and illustrations by Baba Wagu? Diakit?. Scholastic, 1999.
- Why Leopard Has Spots: Dan Stories From Liberia. Text by Won-Ldy Paye and Margaret H. Lippert. Illustrations by Ashley Bryan. Fulcrum, 1998.

1998 Aesop Prize

- Echoes Of The Elders: The Stories And Paintings Of Chief Lelooska. Text and illustrations by Lelooska (Don Morse Smith.). DK Publishing, Inc., 1997.

1998 Aesop Accolades

- The Girl Who Dreamed Only Geese And Other Tales Of The Far North. Text by Howard Norman. Illustrations by Leo and Diane Dillon. Harcourt Brace, 1997.
- The Hatmaker's Sign: A Story By Benjamin Franklin. Text by Candace Fleming. Illustrations by Robert Andrew Parker. Orchard, 1998.
- The Legend Of The White Buffalo Woman. Text and illustrations by Paul Goble. National Geographic Society, 1998.
- Momentos Magicos/Magic Moments: Tales From Latin America English and Spanish texts by Olga Loya. August House, 1997.

1997 Aesop Prize

- Earth Tales From Around The World. Text by Michael J. Caduto. Illustrations by Adelaide Murphy Tyrol. Fulcrum, 1997.
- The Hired Hand: An African-American Folktale. Text by Robert D. San Souci. Illustrations by Jerry Pinkney. Dial Books for Young Readers, 1997.

1997 Aesop Accolades

- Bouki Dances The Kokioko: A Comical Tale From Haiti. Text by Diane Wolkstein. Illustrations by Jesse Sweetwater. Harcourt Brace, 1997.
- The Cricket's Cage: A Chinese Folktale. Text and illustrations by Stefan Czernecki. Hyperion, 1997.
- Esther's Story. Text by Diane Wolkstein. Illustrations by Juan Wijngaard. Morrow Junior Books, 1996.
- Full Moon Stories: Thirteen Native American Legends. Text and illustrations by Eagle Walking Turtle. Hyperion, 1997.
- Musicians Of The Sun. Text and illustrations by Gerald McDermott. Simon & Schuster, 1997.
- The Sea King's Daughter: A Russian Legend. Text by Aaron Shepard. Illustrations by Gennady Spirin. Atheneum, 1997.

1996 Aesop Prize

- Next Year In Jerusalem. Text by Howard Schwartz. Illustrations by Neil Waldman. Viking, 1996.
- Nursery Tales Around The World. Text by Judy Sierra. Illustrations by Stefano Vitale. Clarion, 1996.

1996 Aesop Accolades

- The Biggest Frog In Australia. Text and illustrations by Susan L. Roth. Simon and Schuster, 1996.
- The Maiden Of the Northland: A Hero Tale Of Finland. Text by Aaron Shepard. Illustrations by Carol Schwartz.
- Medio-Pollito/Half-Chicken. Text by Alma Flor Ada. Illustrations by Kim Howard. Doubleday, 1996.
- Mysterious Tales Of Japan. Text by Rafe Martin. Illustrations by Tatsuro Kiuchi. G.P. Putnam, 1996.
- Princess Florecita And The Iron Shoes. Text by John Warren Stewig. Illustrations by K. Wendy Propp. Apple Soup Books, 1995.
- Songs For Survival: Songs And Chants From Tribal Peoples Around The World. Compiled by Nikki Siegen-Smith. Illustrations by Bernard Lodge. Dutton, 1995.
- The Story Of The Milky Way: A Cherokee Tale. Text by Joseph Bruchac and Gayle Ross. Illustrations by Virginia A. Stroud. Dial, 1995.
- The Turkey Girl. Text by Penny Pollock. Illustrations by Ed Young. Little Brown, 1996.
- When The World Was Young: Creation And Pourquoi Tales. Text by Margaret Mayo. Illustrations by Louise Brierley. Simon and Schuster, 1995.
- Wicked Jack. Text by Connie N. Wooldridge. Illustrations by Will Hillenbrand. Holiday House, 1995.
- The Woman In The Moon: A Story From Hawai'i. Text by Jama Kim Rattagan. Illustrations by Carla Golembe. Little Brown Canada, 1996.

1995 Aesop Prize

- Fair Is Fair: World Folktales Of Justice, text by Sharon Creeden (August House, 1994)

1995 Aesop Accolades

- Coyote And The Winnowing Birds: A Traditional Hopi Tale, based On a Story Told By Eugene Sekaquaptewa. Translated by Emory Sekaquaptewa and Barbara Pepper and illustrated by Hopi children (Clear Light, 1994)
- Duppy Talk: West Indian Tales Of Magic And Mystery, text by Gerald Hausman (Simon and Schuster, 1994)
- Giants! Stories From Around The World, text by Paul Robert Walker, illustr. by James Bernardin (Harcourt Brace, 1995)
- The Gifts Of Wali Dad: A Tale Of India And Pakistan, text by Aaron Shepard, illustr. by Daniel San Souci (Atheneum, 1995)
- When The World Ended, How Hummingbird Got Fire, How People Were Made: Rumsien Ohlone Stories, text and illustr. by Linda Yamane (Oyate, 1995)
- Why Alligator Hates Dog: A Cajun Folktale, text by J.J. Reneaux, illustr. by Donnie Lee Green (August House, 1995)

1994 Aesop Prize

- John Henry, text by Julius Lester, illustr. by Jerry Pinkney (Dial, 1994)

1994 Aesop Accolades

- Baba Yaga: A Russian Folktale, text and illustr. by Katya Arnold (North-South, 1993)
- The Bossy Gallito, text by Lucia M. Gonzalez, illustr. by Lulu Delacre (Scholastic, 1994)
- Christopher: The Holy Giant, text and illustr. by Tomie de Paola (Holiday House, 1994)
- Coyote And Little Turtle: A Traditional Hopi Tale, told by Herschel Talashoema and illustr. by Hopi children of the Hotevilla-Bacavi Community School. Translated and edited by Emory Sekaquaptewa and Barbara Pepper (Clear Light, 1994)
- The Girl Who Wanted To Hunt: A Siberian Tale, text by Emery Bernhard, illustr. by Durga Bernhard (Holiday House, 1994)
- The Magic Storysinger From The Finnish Epic Tale Kalevala, text and illustr. by M.E.A. McNeil (Stemmer House, 1993)
- The Mummer's Song, text by Bud Davidge, illustr. by Ian Wallace. Afterword by Kevin Major (Douglas & McIntyre, 1993)
- Shadow Of A Flying Bird: A Legend Of The Kurdistani Jews, text and illustr. by Mordecai Gerstein (Hyperion, 1994)

1993 Aesop Prize

- Cut From The Same Cloth: American Women In Myth, Legend, And Tall Tale, text by Robert D. San Souci, illustr. by Brian Pinkney (Philomel, 1993)
- Love Flute, text and illustr. by Paul Goble (Bradbury, 1993)

1993 Aesop Accolades (this was the first year the Accolades were awarded)

- Big Men, Big Country: A Collection Of American Tall Tales, text by Robert Paul Walker, illustr. by James Bernardin (Harcourt Brace, 1993)
- The Green Gourd: A North Carolina Folktale, text by C.W. Hunter, illustr. by Tony Griego (G.P. Putnam, 1992)
- Ishi's Tale Of Lizard, text by Leanne Hinton, illustr. by Susan L. Roth (Farrar, Straus & Giroux, 1992)
- Northern Lights: The Soccer Trails, text by Michael Arvaarluk Kusugak, illustr. by Vladyana Krykorka (Annick Press, 1993)
- Sundiata: Lion King Of Mali, text and illustr. by David Wisniewski (Clarion, 1993)
- Surtsey: The Newest Place On Earth, text by Kathryn Lasky, photographs by Christopher G. Knight (Hyperion, 1992)

1992 Aesop Prize

- Aesop And Company With Scenes From His Legendary Life, text by Barbara Bader, illustr. by Arthur Geisert (Houghton Mifflin, 1992)
- Days Of Awe: Stories For Rosh Hashanah And Yom Kippur, text by Eric A. Kimmel, illustr. by Erika Weihs (Viking, 1992)
