= Ren Rongrong =

Chinese writer and translator (1923–2022)

Ren Rongrong (任溶溶; 19 May 1923 – 22 September 2022) was a Chinese writer and translator of Russian, English, Italian and Japanese children's literature.

== Life and career ==
Ren was born in Heshan, Guangdong Province. After graduating from the Department of Chinese Literature at the Great China University in 1945, he served as Vice Director of the editorial department of Juvenile and Children's Publishing House and Deputy Editor-in-Chief of Shanghai Translation Publishing House.

== Honours and awards ==
- Chen Bochui Children's Literature Award
- Soong Chingling Children's Literature Award
- Soong Ching-ling Camphor Tree Award
- Asian Children's Book Award
- 2013 Shanghai Life Award in Literature and Art
- 2012 "Lifetime Achievement Award in Translation" from the Translators Association of China
- 2006 IBBY Honor Award for his translation of Charlie and the Chocolate Factory
- 2002 "Senior Translator" award of the Translators Association of China

== Translations ==
Ren's translations include

- The Complete Andersen's Fairy Tales
- Pushkin's Fairy Tales
- Pinocchio
- Pippi Longstocking
- The Wind in the Willows
- The Twelve Months
- Russian Folk Tales

== Sources ==
- China.org.cn Wiki
