= Chen Bochui =

Chinese writer and translator

Chen Bochui (陈伯吹) (1906–1997) was a famous Chinese writer and literary translator, particularly of children's literature. He translated The Wizard of Oz, Don Quixote, Pushkin's Children's Tales and Heidi into Chinese. He left all of his savings to set up a children's literature award, the Chen Bochui Children's Literature Award. He is known in China as the “Andersen of the East” and as one of the fathers of Chinese Modern Children's Literature.

Chen Bochui was born in Luodian, a small town in Baoshan, Jiangsu province. He began working as a school teacher in 1922, and in 1931 was editor of Children's Magazine. He was also a journalist, a translator and writer of poetry and novels. After the Sino-Japanese War of 1937–1945, he began to focus on writing and translating children's literature, and in 1946 he helped to establish the Association of Children's Book Authors in Shanghai. After the founding of the People's Republic of China, in 1949, he was deputy director of the Chinese Children's Publishing House and director of the Shanghai Children's Publishing House. He was also a professor at Beijing Normal University, and a member of the Chinese Writers Association.

In 1981, Chen Bochui donated his lifetime savings – 55,000 Chinese Yuan – to establish the “Children's Literature Gardener Award”, a yearly prize meant to encouraging the creation of children's literature in China. This award, in which lay the foundations of the present CICLA, rewarded most of the prominent Chinese children's writers of the late 20th century.

== Publications ==
Chen Bochui published over 70 books, including A Cat That Wants to Fly, and On Children’s Literature. He engaged in creative writing and in literary criticism.

== Legacy ==
In 1981, Chen Bochui donated 55,000 yuan as seed money for a literary foundation, and in 1983 the Chen Bochui Children’s Literature Award (CICLA) was established. A memorial featuring his work can be visited at the Baoshan District Public Library.
