= Golden Pinwheel Young Illustrators Award =

Book illustration award

The Golden Pinwheel Young Illustrators Competition (童书展和金风车国际青年插画大赛) was held for the first time at the China Children's Book Fair (CCBF), in Shanghai, in 2015, and, like the CCBF, is set to become an annual event, the aim being to identify talented young creators of children's book illustration from around the world. It was sponsored by Kodak. In 2015, almost a thousand works were submitted by 253 competitors from 15 countries and regions.

== 2013 Prize winners ==
International Original Picture Book Award winners:

- Los Zapatos de Fred Astaire Y Otras Historias Increibles (Apila Ediciones, Spain)
- Monstruo Rosa (Apila Ediciones, Spain)
- Oh, What a Tangle! (Digital Leaf, U.K.)
- A Feather (China Children's Press & Publication Group, China)
- Cloud Bird (Jieli Publishing House, China)
- Wukong, Becoming Good (Beijing Poplar Culture Project Co. Ltd., China)
- Pumpkin Monk (Zhejiang Juvenile and Children's Publishing House, China)
- Mice at Home? (Tomorrow Publishing House/Hsin-Yi, China)
- The Fish in Beiming (Tomorrow Publishing House/Hsin-Yi, China)

=== China Original Children’s Book Award winners ===
- The Stars Gulf (Juvenile and Children's Publishing House)
- Fairy Foxes in Pu’s Garden (People's Literature Publishing House/Daylight Publishing House)
- Guosisi Children’s Poem (Haifeng Publishing)
- My Name is Xia Dandan (Jieli Publishing House)
- The Green House (Anhui Children's Publishing House)
- An Open Door (New Buds Publishing House)
- Bi Bi in the High House (New Buds Publishing House)
- The Flying-fish in the Xisha Islands (New Buds Publishing House)
- Mother Fox Saves Her Child (Phoenix Juvenile and Children's Publishing Ltd.)
- Yu Bao’s World (Phoenix Juvenile and Children's Publishing Ltd.)
- The Queen of Wolf Kingdom (Children's Fun Publishing Co., Ltd/Post and Telecom Press)
- I Become an Invisible Person (Zhejiang Juvenile and Children's Publishing House)
- Land Street in the Afternoon (Zhejiang Juvenile and Children's Publishing House)
- The Bone of the Grass (Tomorrow Publishing House)
- Liu Dafan and Her Classmates (Juvenile and Children's Publishing House)
- Thousands of Ways to Play (Juvenile and Children's Publishing House)
- Colorful Anthology of Tangtang’s Tales of Growth (Juvenile and Children's Publishing House)
- Nongni’s Childhood (Juvenile and Children's Publishing House)
- The Burning Planet (China Children's Press and Publication Group)
- The Loveable Funny Mouse Series (21st Century Publishing House)

== 2015 Prize winners ==
Gold Prize (Grand Prix) Winners

- International: Michal Suska (Poland)
- China: Zhou Jieyuan 周劼媛

Silver Award Winners

- Shou Tao 兽桃
- Wang Xiaoxiao 王笑笑

Bronze Award Winners

- Han Han (illustrator) 含含
- Wang Jue (illustrator) 王珏
- Ye Luying 叶露盈

Excellence Award Winners

- Zhang Yu 张钰 and Gong Yifei 巩艺飞
- Picture Book Creation Studio, Central Academy of Fine Arts 央美绘本创作工作室
- Liu Chao 刘超
- Meng Ziru 孟子茹
- Wang Lala 王拉拉
- Wen Xin 温馨
- Xu Qingfeng 许青峰
- Yan Xueqing 颜雪晴
- Yang Zhujun 杨筑珺
- Zhao Yufei 赵喻非

== 2016 Prize winners ==
The jury members for the 2016 prize were Benjamin Chaud (France), William Grill (UK), Sun Shiqian (China), Lin Hua (China), Ishikawa Ikuko (Japan), Miao Wei (China) and Zhao Xiaoyin (China). There were 338 submissions, and 53 illustrators were shortlisted.

Winners: Picture Book Category

- Grand Prix (China) – Ms Ye Luying (China)
- Grand Prix (International) – Ms Fatemah Nakhaei (Iran)
- Silver Award – Ms Sally Anne Walker (UK)
- Bronze Award – Ms Zhu Lin (China)
- Awards of Excellence – Ms Fu Wenzheng (China), Ms Li Qiaoqiao (China), Ms Banafsheh Erfanian (Iran), Mr Ali Ghorbanimoghaddam (Iran), Ms Loes Riphagen (Netherlands)
- Publishers' Choice Award – Ms Mahshid Raghemi (Iran)
- Shaker Creator Award – Mr Olga De Dios (Spain)
- People's Choice Award – Ms Chen Yucong (China)

Winners – Comic/Manga/Graphic Novel Category

- Urban China Award – Mr Xiao Xuepeng (China)
- Reed Pop China Comic Con Award – Mr Zhao Ze (China)

== 2017 Prize winners ==
The jury members for the 2017 prize are Fei Jia 费嘉 (China), Jiu Er 九儿 (China), Yan Xiaoli 颜小鹂 (China), Wang Zhigeng 王志庚 (China), Zhuang Weijia 庄维嘉 (China), Chris Haughton (Ireland) and Misha Blaise (USA). There were 3655 submissions from 37 countries & regions. Fifty finalists were selected; the winners were announced at the Shanghai International Children's Book Fair, 17–19 November 2017. A colour catalogue of the winners was produced: CCBF 金风车国际青年 插画家大赛 / CCBF Golden Pinwheel Young Illustrators Competition Catalogue 2017 featuring the 2015 and 2016 winners and the 2017 finalists.

- Grand Award (China) - Zhang Fan (China)
- Grand Award (International) - Joan Negrescolor (Spain)
- Publisher's Choice Award - Dale Blankenaar (South Africa)
- People's Choice Award - Adolfo Serra (Spain)

=== Finalists ===
- Rocio Alejandro (Argentina)
- Mahdi Ashari (Iran)
- Mohammad Barrangi Fashtami (Iran)
- Dale Blankenaar (South Africa)
- Birfish 春鱼秋鸟 (China)
- Caver 乌猫 (China)
- Katsiaryna Dubovik (Netherlands)
- Francesca Dell'Orto (Italy)
- Duan Kailin 段凯琳 (China)
- Joan Fernandez Vicente (Spain)
- Juanjo Gasull (Spain)
- Gudong 咕咚 (China)
- Ester Garcia Cortes (Spain)
- Carly Gledhill (UK)
- Huang Yi 黄祎 (China)
- Maryam Hasan Nejad (Iran)
- Tomas Ives (Chile)
- Jin Xiaojing 金晓婧 (USA)
- Nahid Kazemi (Canada)
- Liu Lanfang 刘兰芳 (China)
- Leng Xiaoyu 棱小宇 (China)
- Li Qingyue 李清月 (China)
- Liu Juan 刘娟 (China)
- Li Xingming 李星明 (China)
- Missionart 妙象童画 (China)
- Ma Penghao 马鹏浩 (China)
- Daishu Ma 马岱姝 (China/Spain)
- Najmeh Moradi Chadegani (Iran)
- Kiki Ni 倪思琪 (China)
- Marianna Oklejak (Poland)
- Laura Renzullo (Argentina)
- Catarina Sobral (Portugal)
- Adolfo Serra (Spain)
- Azar Teimouri (Iran)
- Tu Qianwen 涂倩雯 (USA)
- Ekaterine Tabliashvili (Georgia)
- Catia Vidinhas (Portugal)
- Wang Xiaoyue 王小月 (China)
- Wang Wei 王炜 (China)
- Wen Aining 温艾凝 (China)
- Mango Xu 徐虹艳 (China)
- Anne Xu 许玉安 (China)
- Peakii Young 杨佩琪 (China)
- Yu Yin 俞寅 (China)
- Yang Huiwen 杨慧文 (China)
- Diana Sofia Zapata Ochoa (Ecuador)
- Zhu Yu 朱昱 (China)
- Zahra Mohamanajad (Iran)
- Zi Li 晚点的子狸 (China)
- Zhang Fan 张帆 (China)

== 2018 Prize Winners ==
The jury members were Serge Bloch (France), Cai Gao China), FEI Jia (China), Gita Wolf (India) and XIONG Liang (China).

- Grand Award (China) - Heimi (China)
- Grand Award (International) - Elina Ellis (UK)
- Publisher's Choice Award - Monika Vaicenaviciene (Lithuania)
- Special Mentions
  - Catarina Sobral (Portugal)
  - Raquel Bonita (Spain)
  - Miao Yu (China)

== 2019 Prize Winners ==
The jury members were Ivan Canu (Italy), André Letria (Portugal), Kiyoko Matsuoka (Japan), Yang Zhong (China) and Zhou Xiang (China).

- Grand Award (China) - Gui Tuzi (China)
- Grand Award (International) - Guilherme Karsten (Brazil)
- People's Choice Award - Stefano Di Christofano (Venezuela)
- Special Mentions
  - Romolo Eduardo D'Hipolito (Brazil)
  - Li Jingxin (China)
  - Miguel Pang Ly (Spain)
  - Zhao Niaoer (China)

== 2020 Prize Winners ==
The jury members were Chen Hui (China), Sunkyung Cho (Korea), Simon de Jocas (Canada), Philip Giordano (Italy) and Jiu’er (China).

- Grand Award (China) - Ling Luo (China) - for Three Friends
- Grand Award (International) - Veronica Neacsu (Romania) - for Mumuri's Sleep
- Special Mentions
- Jam Dong (China) - for The Secret Life of Caterpillars
- Francesco Giustozzi (Italy) - Let's Play
- Ida Hong (South Korea) - for Carpenter

== 2021 Prize Winners ==
The jury members were Debbie Bibo (USA/Italy), Huang Li (China), Ken Niimura (Spain/Japan), Martin Salisbury (UK), and Zhu Ziqiang (China).

- Grand Award (China) Yu Chongjing (China) - for Ah Mei's Cake Shop
- Grand Award (International) - Anna & Varvara Kendel (Russia) - My Childhood in Siberia
- Special Mentions
- Alexandra Mirzac (Romania) - for Lost
- Roozeboos (Netherlands) - for Choices
- Diane Li (China) - The Giant's Garden
- Zong Minghao (China) - Smartphone
- Yuliya Gwilym (Ukraine) - What the Moon Told Me
