= Gita Wolf =

Indian author, publisher, and curator

Gita Wolf (born 1956) is an Indian author, publisher, and curator, and one of the founders of Indian publishing house, Tara Books.

== Career ==
=== Publishing ===
Wolf has collaborated with folk artists and tribal communities in India to publish volumes of folk art from India. Wolf began her career teaching comparative literature in Germany, where she lived along with husband, Helmut. In 1994 she sold her first book, The Very Hungry Lion, to Annick Books at the Frankfurt Book Fair. With their assistance, Wolf established a publishing imprint, Tara Books, in Chennai, India, along with several colleagues, and produced screen-printed editions of children's books and collections of folk art. Wolf has worked closely with members of the Gondi tribe in Madhya Pradesh, the Warli tribe in Maharashtra, and artists working in the Madhubani/Mithila tradition and the Meena tribe in Bihar, and Patua artisans in West Bengal. Wolf has also worked with artists from Oaxaca, Mexico, and indigenous artists from Australia to publish illustrated folk stories from their traditions.

Wolf has publicly advocated for the preservation of folk art, folk lore, and traditions in India, for the preservation of traditional printing techniques, such as relief art, sustainable practices in book printing and for sustainable practices in book printing. In an interview with Forbes in 2015, Wolf said “Many of the tribal artists that we work with would sell their prints in order to make a living, but we helped them become authors.” Wolf has authored over twenty books herself, writing for both, adults and children. The Night Life of Trees, a 2006 book written by Wolf and illustrated by Gondi artists Bhajju Shyam, Durga Bai Vyam and Ram Singh Urveti was reviewed by Maria Popova, who wrote about the "breathtakingly beautiful illustrations" as well as the quality of screen-printing in the book's production. The Night Life of Trees also won an award at the Bologna Children's Book Fair in 2008.

=== Curation ===
Wolf has also curated several collections of folk art from India, including an exhibition of art and books published by Tara Books for the Itabashi Museum in Tokyo in 2018, and a collection of women's art in Chennai, in 2014.

=== Writing ===
Books that Wolf has co-authored with indigenous and tribal artists and writers have received public recognition; in 2015, Tree Matters, by Gangu Bai, V. Geetha won an Aesop Accolade, and in 2011, Following My Paint Brush, written by Wolf, and illustrated by Dulari Devi was nominated for a Crossword Book Award. In addition, Tara Books has received several awards for children's publishing, including an award in 2013 for the "best children’s book publisher in Asia" at the Bologna Children's Book Fair.

== Bibliography ==
- Gita Wolf, The Very Hungry Lion: A Folktale (1995)
- Gita Wolf, Anushka Ravishankar, Puppets Unlimited (1998)
- Gita Wolf, Sirish Rao, Rathna Ramanathan, In The Dark (2000)
- Gita Wolf, Sirish Rao, Indrapramit Roy, The Tree Girl (2001)
- Gita Wolf, Sirish Rao, Emanuele Scanziani, The Legend of the Fish (2003)
- Gita Wolf, Kanchana Arni, Beasts of India (2003)
- Gita Wolf, Anushka Ravishankar, Trash! On Ragpicker Children and Recycling (2004)
- Gita Wolf, Bhajju Shyam, Durga Bai Vyam, Ram Singh Urveti, The Night Life of Trees (2006)
- Gita Wolf, Kusum Dhadpe, Ramesh Hengadi, Rasika Hengadi, Shantaram Dhadpe, Do! (2009)
- Dulari Devi, Gita Wolf, Following my Paintbrush (2011)
- Gita Wolf, The Enduring Ark (2013)
- Gita Wolf, Sirish Rao, Antigone (2015)
- Bhajju Shyam, Gita Wolf, Creation (2015)
- Gita Wolf, KnockI Knock! (2018)
