= Xiong Liang =

Chinese illustrator

Xiong Liang (熊亮) is a Chinese illustrator. (He is also known as Kim Xiong.)

== Awards and honours ==
- 2018 Shortlisted for the Hans Christian Andersen Award
- 2017 Winner of a Chen Bochui Children's Literature Award - for Walk With the Wind 《和风一起散步》

== Books ==
- 《兔儿爷》 The Toy Rabbit Story, Heryin Books, Inc., USA, 2005.
- 《小石狮》 A Little Stone Lion
- 《土将》 The Earthen General
- 《小年兽》 The New Year Monster
- 《灶王爷》 Kitchen God
- 《武松打虎》 《Wu Song Fights the Tiger》
- Family Tree
- 《屠龙族》 Dragon Slayers
- 《梅雨怪》 Monster Plum Rain
- 《一切有心》 All Determined To
- 《月亮朋友》 The Moon, My Friend
- 《月亮上的筵席》 Teatime on the Moon (2012)
- 《野孩子》 The Wild Child (2013)
- 《和风一起散步》 Walk With the Wind
- 《中国经典 1》Classical Chinese Stories 1
- 《中国经典 2》Classical Chinese Stories 2
- 《中国经典 3》Classical Chinese Stories 3
- 《中国经典 4》Classical Chinese Stories 4
- 《中国经典 5》Classical Chinese Stories 5
- 《长坂坡》
- 《金刚师》
- 《金刚师》
- 《穿墙术》
- 《南瓜和尚》
- 《一园青菜成了精》
- 《大鸟的自行车房》
- Le chat general Zhang Fei
- Le gentil monstre
