= Du Shuzhen =

Chinese imam

Aminah
- 杜淑贞
- Born: Du Shuzhen; 1924 (age 101–102); Kaifeng, Henan, China
- Known for: Female imam, first woman from Henan to make hajj

Du Shuzhen (Chinese: 杜淑贞; pinyin: Dù Shūzhēn; born 1924), also known as Aminah, is a Chinese imam. With the help of her uncle and a family friend, both of whom were imams based in Shanghai and Henan respectively, she learned to read the Quran in Arabic. Du carried out her first Hajj in 1992, becoming the first woman in Henan to do so.

== Early life ==
Du was born in 1924 in Kaifeng, Henan, China. She was given the Islamic name Aminah (埃米乃). Her father, a Hui Muslim, became an imam after his antique shop was looted during the Second Sino-Japanese War, while her mother died before Du was a teenager. Following the death of her mother, Du moved in with her aunt. At age eight, Du entered the local women's mosque, where she studied Islam for some six years. In accordance with her father's wishes, at age fifteen, Du married a fellow Chinese Muslim scholar. Dissatisfied with her marriage, she nonetheless followed her husband to Shanxi. However, he died of illness after two years; refusing to remarry, Du returned to Kaifeng, whereupon she continued studying at the mosque in the hopes of becoming an imam herself. Her decision was not well received by her family.

== Career ==
Back in Kaifeng, Du completed her Islamic studies in Persian under the supervision of a female imam. With the help of her uncle and a family friend, both of whom were imams based in Shanghai and Henan respectively, she also learnt to read the Quran in Arabic. In 1949, Du became an imam at the Shifu Mosque in Zhengzhou. Du subsequently worked at other women's mosques across China, including in Kaifeng, Xingyang, and Xi'an. During the Cultural Revolution, Du sought refuge at the East Mosque in her hometown. In 1981, she was appointed as a senior Islamic teacher at the Beida Street Women's Mosque in Zhengzhou. Two years later, she was promoted to lifelong imam at the mosque. Du carried out her first Hajj in 1992, becoming the first woman in Henan to do so. She undertook the pilgrimage another three times, in 1994, 1999, and 2005. Du was very active as an Islamic grassroots leader in China and was a member of several organizations, including the Henan Provincial Islamic Association, the Zhengzhou City Islamic Association, and the Chinese Islamic Association.
