= Children's book illustration =

Illustrations for children's books

Children's book illustration is a subfield of book illustration, and a genre of art associated with children's literature. Children's books with illustrations are often known as picture books.

Illustrations contribute to the children's development and provide them with aesthetic impressions.

== History ==
With the development of printing, the first illustrated books for children began to appear. At first they were primarily religious texts, grammar books, and works about good behavior.

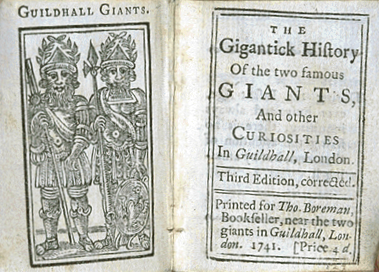
Two pages including one illustration from Boreman's The Gigantic History of the Two Famous Giants (ca 1730–1750)

According to Cynthia Burlingham. the first books with illustrations that could be read for children were collections of fairy tales, especially Aesop's Fables (first English edition in 1484 by William Caxton), which soon became one of the most popular illustrated books for children. Another early example of an illustrated book for children was Fabulae Centum (1564) by Gabriel Faerno, William Feaver, however, named Orbis Pictus from 1658 by John Amos Comenius as the earliest illustrated book specifically for children.

Writing in the 1970s, Feaver argued that outside occasional exceptions, the history of children's illustrations can be said to be about two centuries old. Initially, illustrations in children's books were almost no different from illustrations in adult editions and were not adapted to the perceptual needs of children. Illustrations in children's books became more popular from the mid-18th century. In England, publisher Thomas Boreman released illustrated miniature books entitled Gigantick Histories (1740–1743). Notable English illustrated books for children from that period were published by John Newbery (A Little Pretty Pocket-Book from 1744 and The History of Little Goody Two-Shoes from 1765). Other important English publishers of illustrated children books from that period included John Marshall and John Harris. The genres of illustrated children's literature at that time were dominated by the fairy tale and the moral tale; with the former on average having more illustrations.

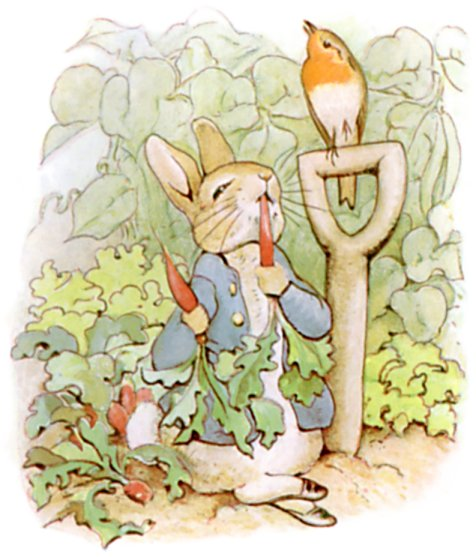
Illustration of Peter Rabbit eating radishes, from The Tale of Peter Rabbit (1901) by British author and illustrator, Beatrix Potter

As the toy market grew, illustrated children's books began to be equipped with elements such as moving parts. Creators who specialized in such books included the German graphic artist Lothar Meggendorfer and British publisher Robert Sayer. Technical solutions available in the 20th century meant that illustrated books for children could be relatively cheap while maintaining good quality. The classic illustration drawing techniques were joined by photography, which was used both as a replacement for, for example, woodcuts, and was also used in the process of reproduction. Illustrated children's books gradually became more and more adapted to the needs of specific age groups, and the variety of genres of illustrated children's books almost equals those of books for adults.

Feaver described the evolution of dominant traditions in children's illustration as follows: "chapbook to picture book, to Crane toybook, to Père Castor picture albums".

== Function ==
Children's book illustrations can drive the plot or bring the plot to life. While some picture books are written and illustrated by the same person, others are collaborations between an author and an illustrator. Editors of picture books often look carefully for an illustrator that matches the style of the text, while still adding their own artistic value to the book. There must be mutual respect between an author and an illustrator in the creation of a successful picture book.

Text and image in picture books usually form one whole, because a children's illustration should directly refer to the text. In some cases, it may also be the only component of a book for children, especially the youngest – such books may then take the form of an album without text or with a small amount of text.

== Children's illustrators ==
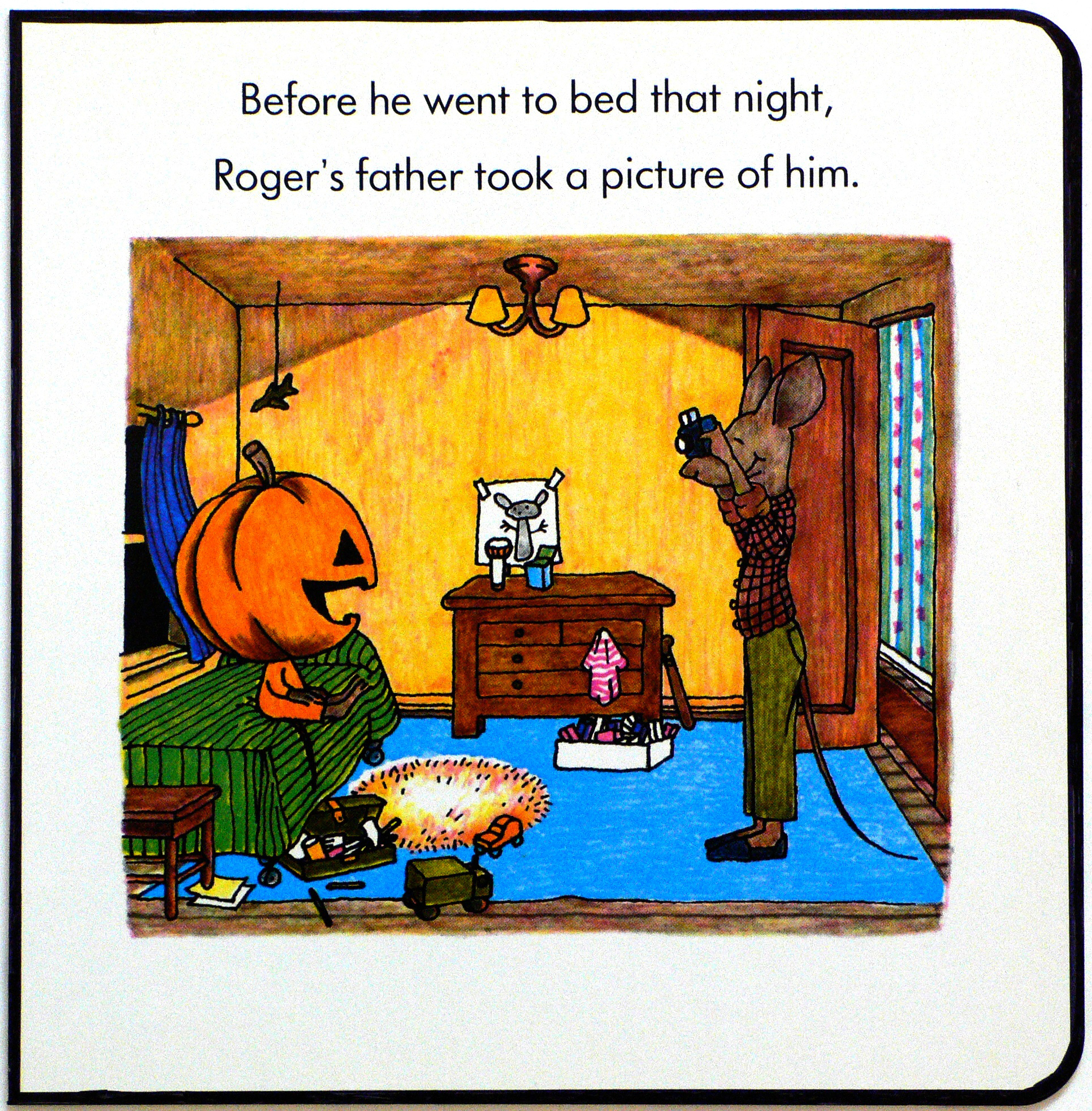
Example of a modern illustration from The Halloween Play (2013) written and illustrated by Felicia Bond

The boundary between illustrations for children and adults can be blurry, and throughout their careers many illustrators have created works for children and adults and cannot be simply classified as children illustrators. William Feaver noted that some picture books "were produced as de luxe gift-objects for adults to browse through" (such as the works of Edmund Dulac, Arthur Rackham or Kay Nielsen); others have passed boundaries as genres and tastes changed. He also observed that "many of the illustrations most enjoyed by children ... were not specifically intended for them", citing examples of works by illustrators like W. Heath Robinson, Thomas Bewick or George Cruikshank. He further notes that in cases of Kate Greenaway, Randolph Caldecott or Robinson they "were all-purpose graphic artists who happened to hit on winning treatments of staple children's material ... success made them specialists".

Among the most influential children's book illustrators is Maurice Sendak, who has been called "the leading children's book illustrator of our time".

== Awards ==
The field of children's book illustration has several awards for illustrators, such as:

- Children's Book of the Year Award for New Illustrator (Australia)
- Governor General's Award for English-language children's illustration and Governor General's Award for French-language children's illustration (Canada)
- Golden Pinwheel Young Illustrators Award (China)
- Kate Greenaway Medal (United Kingdom)
- Caldecott Medal (United States)
