= Wang Wenhua (writer) =

Taiwanese novelist and columnist

Wang Wenhua (Chinese: 王文華; born on 17 December 1967), also known as Tom Wang, is a contemporary Taiwanese novelist and columnist. He graduated from the Department of Foreign Languages and Literatures at National Taiwan University, and obtained an MBA from Stanford University. He is the author of Protein Girls (Chinese: 蛋白質女孩) and 61 vs 57. Wang Wenhua has a background in marketing and his novels chronicle the lives of yuppies in Taipei.
