= Bookbreaking =

Removal of pages from books

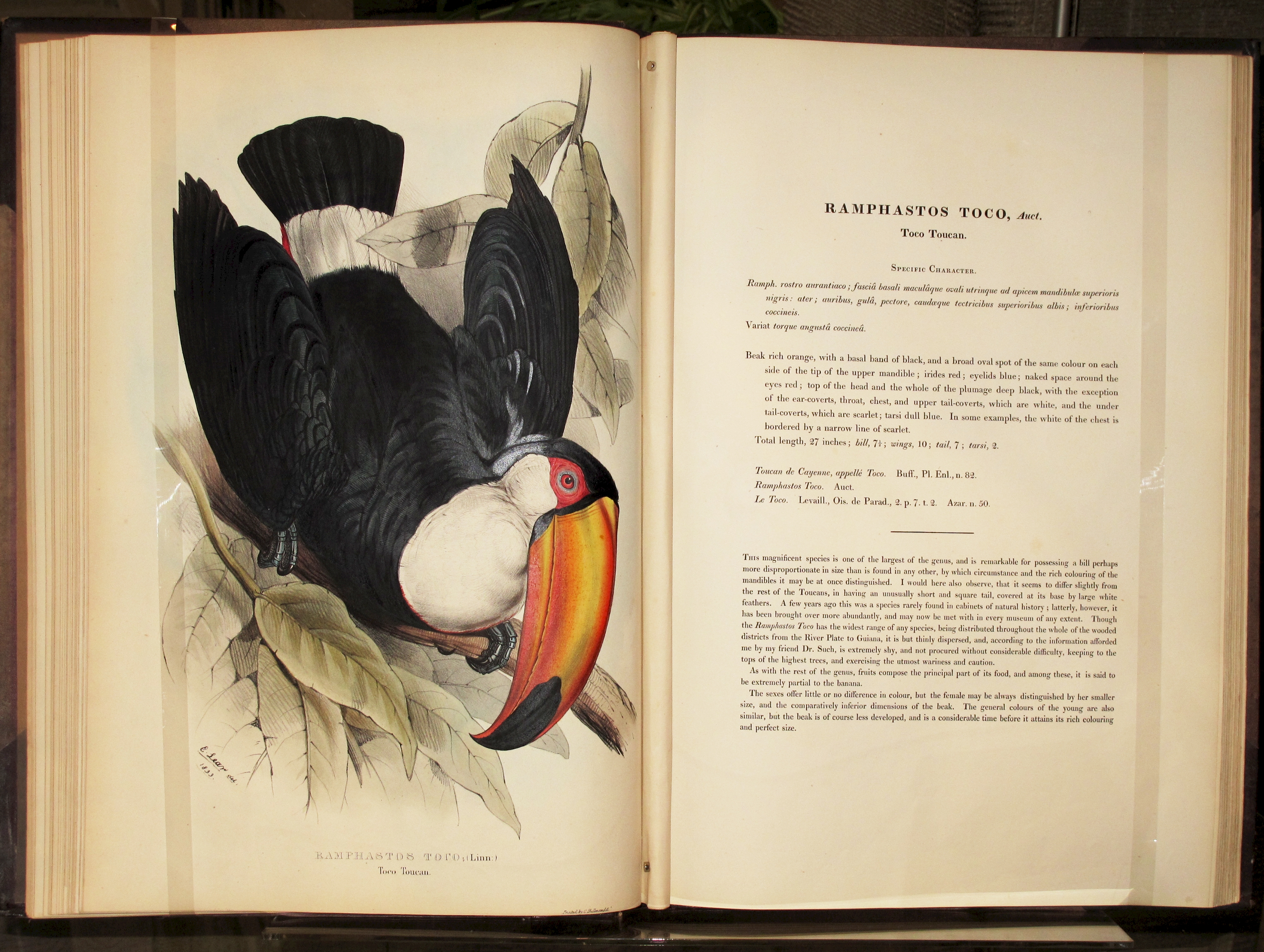
Book with illustration

Bookbreaking is the practice of removing pages (especially those containing maps or illustrations) from books, especially from rare books.

The term is not usually used to refer to outright theft, where the bookbreaker does not own the book in question. There have been many cases of theft of illustrations—especially maps—from rare books in libraries.

== Financial incentives ==
Bookbreaking is most often motivated by a market situation in which the maps or illustrations in a book will have more value sold separately than the value of the intact book. Often this happens because book collectors judge minor defects in an old book so harshly as to make them seemingly unsaleable. This widespread practice probably peaked in the 1970s or 1980s, because the price for old engravings and especially for old maps was outstripping that of rare books. However—in part because so many rare, illustrated books were "broken" in this manner—the price of the intact books has now risen the point where an old book is typically worth more intact. Book collectors have also become more sophisticated in understanding minor condition problems.

== See also ==
- Bibliophilia
- Book collecting
