= Bhajju Shyam =

Indian painter (born 1971)

Bhajju Singh Shyam
- Born: 1971 (age 54–55); Patangarh Village, Madhya Pradesh, India
- Occupation: Artist
- Awards: Padma Shri (2018)

Bhajju Shyam (born 1971 in Patangarh, Central India, full name: Bhajju Singh Shyam) is an Indian artist, belonging to the Gond-Pardhaan community of Madhya Pradesh. He was awarded India's fourth highest civilian award, the Padma Shri, in 2018.

He was a contemporary of the celebrated Pardhaan artist Jangarh Singh Shyam and began his artistic career from Bharat Bhavan, Bhopal. He received international recognition for his book The London Jungle Book (Published By Tara Books in 2004), with which he made known throughout the world the Pardhaan Folk Art.

According to art-historian and author, Jyotindra Jain, Bhajju Shyam was one of the most important and innovative artists to have emerged from the explosion of 'Gond-Pardhaan Painting' tradition spearheaded by Jangarh Singh Shyam.

For his book The Night Life of Trees (2006) he was awarded the 2008 Bologna Children's Book Fair. Bhajju Shyam lives in Bhopal, India.
