= The Happiness of Kati =

2006 novel by Ngarmpun Vejjajiva

The Happiness of Kati (ความสุขของกะทิ) is a novel written by Ngarmpun Vejjajiva, for which she received the S.E.A. Write Award for Thailand in 2006. The book was adapted into a movie of the same title in 2009.

== Synopsis ==
The Happiness of Kati is the story of a nine-year-old girl who lives with her grandparents in a house near a river. She has a happy and simple life. One day her grandmother asks Kati if she would like to go to visit her mother who is very ill, with motor neuron disease. She reveals that her mother has been suffering with this condition for many years.

Kati agrees and travels to the house near the sea to spend some time with her mother. During her stay there, she comes to learn why her mother sent her to her grandparents.

In a few days, Kati's mother dies away. After her funeral, Kati travels to her house in town where she finds boxes in which her mom had collected everything since the day Kati was born. She gets a letter from her Uncle Tong that has her father's address. After this everyone waits for Kati's decision of whether to send a letter to her father. She sends Tong a letter instead. After 7 days she receives no response and decides to go back to her grandparents’ house and spends the rest of her life happy without knowing her father.

== Characters ==
- Kati - “Kati or Nakamon Pojanavit” who lives with her grandfather and grandmother in Phranakron Sri Ayuthaya.
- Mom - Kati's mom or Napat Pojanavit who has Lou Gehrig's disease which made her send Kati away to live with her grandfather and grandmother.
- Grandfather - 65-year-old man and a former lawyer who made a decision to live a simple life out of town with his wife and Kati, his granddaughter.
- Grandmother - 64 years old who used to be a secretary at a big hotel in town where people loved to treat Kati with a beautiful smile.
- Tong - “Tong or Suwan Winaidee” the 13-year-old temple boy who loved to help people and loved Kati as his little sister since the day they met.
- Uncle Tong - 39 years old, cousin of Kati's mom who is very kind and funny.
- Aunt Da - 27 years old secretary to Kati's mom who does everything for Kati's mom as her right hand.
- Uncle Kunn - brother of Kati's mom who loves isolation and is always quiet.

== Editions ==
- The Happiness of Kati (Hardcover) - Published May 9, 2006 by Atheneum Books
- ความสุขของกะทิ (The Happiness of Kati)- Published October 2008 by แพรวสำนักพิมพ์
- ความสุขของกะทิ (Paperback) - Published 2006 by แพรวสำนักพิมพ์
- A Felicidade de Kati (Paperback) - Published February 9, 2011 by Editorial Presença
- The Happiness Of Kati (Paperback) - Published June 1, 2009 by Allen & Unwin Australia
- Le bonheur de Kati (Paperback) - Published August 31, 2006 by Gallimard-Jeunesse

== Awards ==
- South East Asia Writing Award for Thailand in 2006
- Second prize John Dryden Translation Competition in 2005 by Prudence Borthwick
