= Ngarmpun Vejjajiva =

Thai novelist and translator (born 1962)

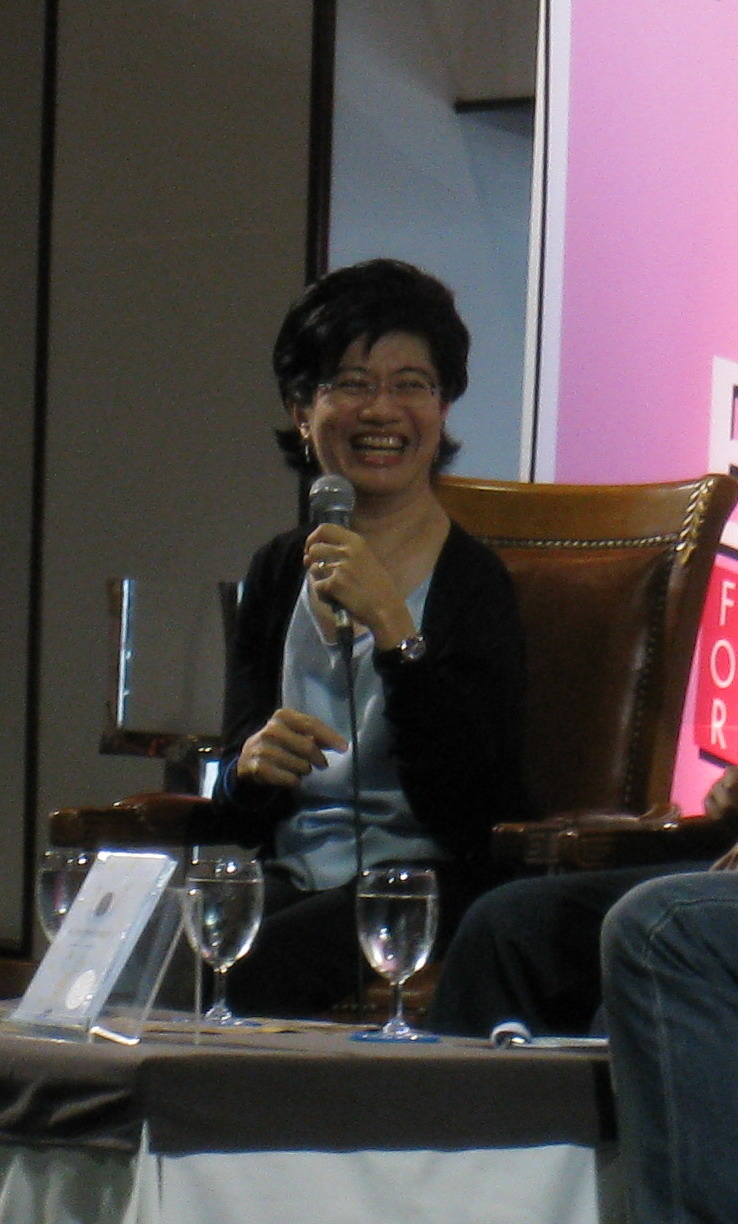
Ngarmpun Vejjajiva

Ngarmpun Vejjajiva (Thai: งามพรรณ เวชชาชีวะ, RTGS: Ngamphan Wetchachiwa; born January 27, 1962, in London) is a Thai novelist and translator. She was the recipient of the S.E.A. Write Award for Thailand in 2006 for her first novel, The Happiness of Kati. A wheelchair user, she has had cerebral palsy since birth and finds comfort in immersing herself in the imaginary world of reading and writing. As is customary for Thais, she has a short nickname, thus many people know her as "Jane". Ngarmpun is the sister of Thailand's former prime minister Abhisit Vejjajiva.

== Biography ==
=== Early life ===
Born as Jane Vejjajiva in England, where her parents were completing their medical studies, she returned to Thailand at age 3 and grew up in Bangkok. She graduated with first class honors with gold medal from Thammasat University with a Bachelor of Arts degree in French literature. She then studied French, Italian and English at the Translators and Interpreters School in Brussels.

=== Career ===
She started her career as translator in a magazine publisher in 1988 before setting up her own company, publishing and editing a children's magazine until 1995. She is now managing director of a copyright agency, Silkroad Publishers Agency.

She also works as freelance translator, with her works including Seta by Alessandro Baricco, Le moine et le philosophe by Jean-François Revel and Mathieu Ricard and The Trumpet of the Swan by E.B. White. Other translations include J.K. Rowling's Harry Potter and the Goblet of Fire, Kate Dicamillo's The Tale of Desperaux and Emmanuel Dongala's Les Petits Enfants Naissent Aussi des Etoiles (Little Children Are Also Born From Stars).

=== Novels ===
Her first novel, The Happiness of Kati (ความสุขของกะทิ), came about during a rare one-month break from her translation work. Always wanting to write a novel, but never having the time, Ngarmpun was inspired one day while working in the kitchen with a spatula and frying pan, which served as the beginnings of characters for the children's story. The Happiness of Kati is about a young Thai girl mourning the death of her mother yet also enjoying life in a small Thai village on the banks of the Chao Phraya River, living with her grandmother and cousins.

The book was published by Praew Books, an imprint of Amarin Printing and Publishing, and has been translated into English, German, Japanese, French and Catalan.

Although generally well received, The Happiness of Kati has received some criticism for its simplistic and bourgeois portrayal of Thai rural life.

A sequel, entitled The Happiness of Kati: Chasing the Moon (ความสุขของกะทิ ตอน ตามหาพระจันทร์) was published in Thai in 2006.

Aside from her novels, Ngarmpun has also written short stories for magazines.

== Awards ==
- 1999 - Chevalier Ordre des Arts et des Lettres.
- 2006 - S.E.A. Write Award

== See also ==
- Abhisit Vejjajiva
