= Bai Meigui Translation Prize =

The Bai Meigui Translation Prize is a translation prize awarded annually by the Leeds Centre for New Chinese Writing, at the University of Leeds.

== About the Prize ==
The aim of the prize is to introduce Chinese writers to English readers, and develop literary translators working from Chinese to English. The judges are practising literary translators. The literary genre and prize change annually, but the Centre always seeks to develop the translator by publishing the translation, thereby giving exposure to both writer and translator, and when possible, offering further training in literary translation.

== Winners of the Prize ==
=== 1st Bai Meigui Prize (2015) ===
Winners: Natascha Bruce and Michael Day
Genre: surreal short story Chicken by Dorothy Tse
Prize: 1 week at a translation summer school, and publication in Structo magazine
Judges: Nicky Harman, Jeremy Tiang, Helen Wang

=== 2nd Bai Meigui Prize (2016) ===
Winner: Luisetta Mudie
Genre: Literary non-fiction piece by Li Jingrui
Prize: 1 week at a translation summer school, and publication on Read Paper Republic
Judges: Nicky Harman, Dave Haysom, Helen Wang

=== 3rd Bai Meigui Prize (2017) ===
Winner: Helen Tat and Liu Jia
Genre: Poetry by Chi Lingyun, Qin Xiaoyu, Xu Xiangchou
Prize: Publication in Stand magazine
Judges: Canaan Morse, Eleanor Goodman, Heather Inwood

=== 4th Bai Meigui Prize (2018) ===
Winner: Jasmine Alexander
Genre: Children's picture book, Happy Mid-Autumn Festival by Meng Yanan
Prize: Publication of bilingual picture book with Balestier Press
Judges: Minjie Chen, Helen Wang, Adam Lanphier
See: Happy Mid-Autumn Festival, by Meng Yanan, tr. Jasmine Alexander (Balestier Press, 2018) ISBN 978-1911221326

=== 5th Bai Meigui Prize (2019) ===
Winner: Bill Leverett
Genre: short story by Chan Ho-kei
Prize: Publication in Pathlight journal of Chinese contemporary literature
Judges: Jeremy Tiang, Tammy Ho Lai-Ming, Natascha Bruce

=== 6th Bai Meigui Prize (2020) ===
Winner: Izzy Hasson
Genre: Children's picture book, Sleepy Sleepy New Year by Meng Yanan
Prize: Publication of bilingual picture book with Balestier Press
Judges: Minjie Chen, Colin Goh, Helen Wang
See: Sleepy Sleepy New Year, by Meng Yanan, tr. Izzy Hasson (Balestier Press, 2020) ISBN 978-1911221777

=== 7th Bai Meigui Prize (2021) ===
Winner: Francesca Jordan
Genre: Literature from Taiwan, a piece by Yang Shuangzi 楊双子
Prize: Bursary for the ‘Bristol Translates’ Literary Translation Summer School
Judges: Susan Wan Dolling, Mike Fu, Darryl Sterk

=== 8th Bai Meigui Prize (2022) ===
Winner: Hongyu Jasmine Zhu
Genre: Picture book from Taiwan
Prize: Mentorship by Helen Wang, and publication of bilingual picture book with Balestier Press
Judges: Nicky Harman, Amanda Ruiqing Flynn, Jennifer Feeley

=== 9th Bai Meigui Prize (2023) ===
Winner: Andrew Rule
Genre: Text by Liang Hong 梁鸿
Prize: A bursary to attend the online 'Bristol Translates' Literary Translation Summer School, and the translation to be published on the Writing Chinese website
Judges: Nicky Harman, Shen Yang, and Michael Day
