= Xu Zechen =

Chinese author of literary fiction (born 1978)

Xu Zechen 徐则臣
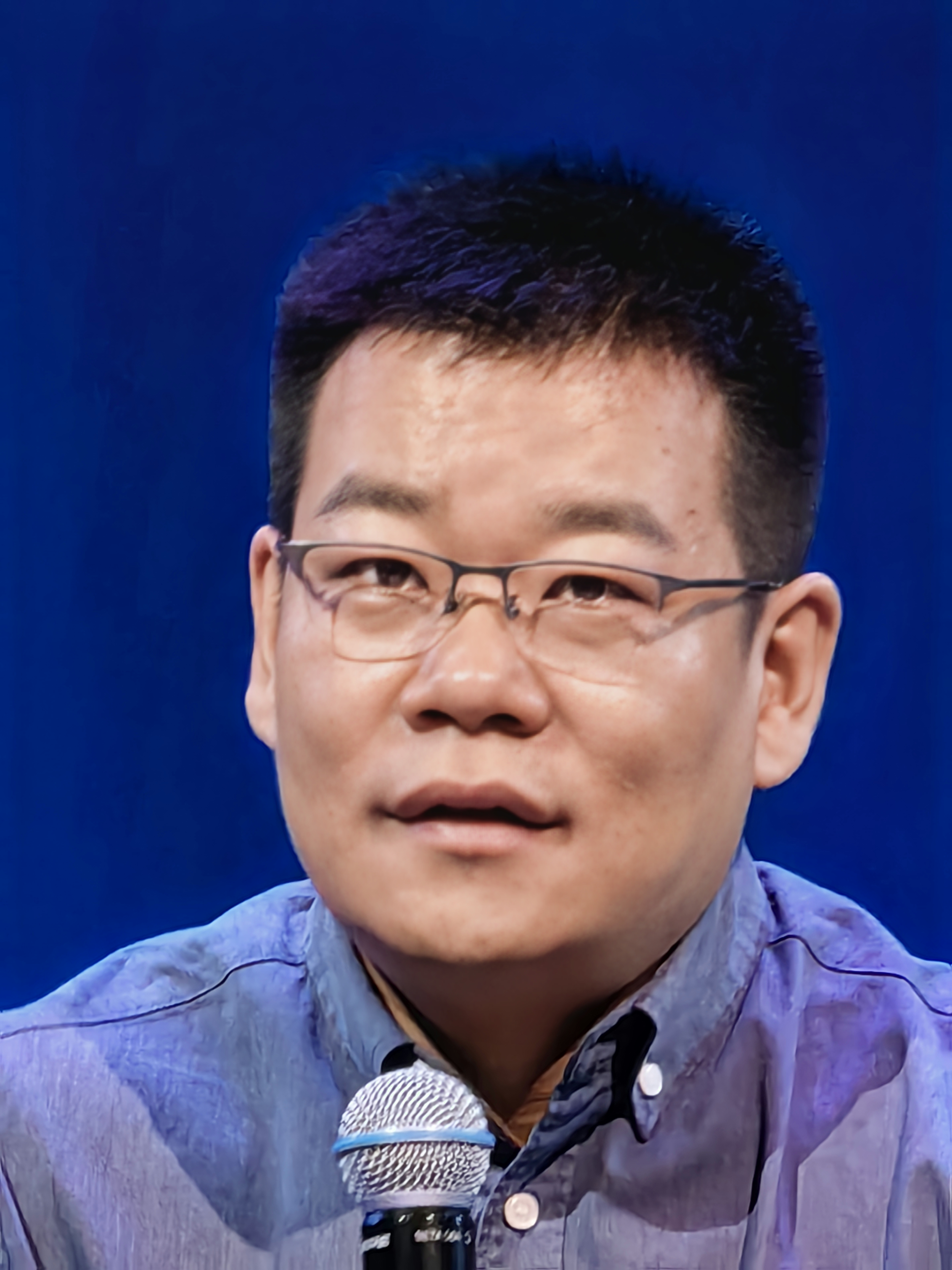
- Born: 1978 (age 47–48); Donghai County, Jiangsu, China
- Citizenship: China
- Education: Peking University
- Occupation: Writer

Xu Zechen (Chinese: 徐则臣; pinyin: Xú Zéchén; born in 1978 in Donghai County, Jiangsu) is a Chinese author of literary fiction. He currently works as an editor at People's Literature Magazine. In 2009 he was a writer in residence at Creighton University and in 2010 he attended the International Writing Program at the University of Iowa.

== Awards ==
- 2014 - Awarded the Short Story Award of the 7th Lu Xun Literary Prize for If A Snowstorm Seals the Door
- 2014 - Awarded the Lao She Literary Award for "Jerusalem"
- 2015 - Nominated for the 9th Mao Dun Literature Prize for "Jerusalem"
- 2016 - Awarded the 1st Cross-Strait Young Writers Prize for "Jerusalem"
- 2019 - Awarded the 10th Mao Dun Literature Prize for "Northward"

== Works ==
Representative works include the following (translated titles are approximate):

=== Novels and Novellas ===
- 《耶路撒冷》 (Jerusalem)
- 《跑步穿过中关村》 Running Through Beijing (tr. by Eric Abrahamsen)
- 《午夜之门》 (Midnight's Door)
- 《夜火车》Night Train (tr. by Jeremy Tiang)
- 《天上人间》(Heaven on Earth)
- 《北上》(Northward)
- 《苍声》Voice Change (tr. by Charles Laughlin)
- 《啊，北京》
- 《西夏》(Western Xia/Tangut)
- 《人间烟火》
- 《逆时针》
- 《居延》(Juyan)
- 《小城市》(Small Town)

=== Short stories ===
- 《花街》(Flower street)
- 《最后一个猎人》(The last hunter)
- 《伞兵与卖油郎》(The parachuter and the oil seller)
- 《纸马》(Paper horses)
- 《我们的老海》(Our old sea)
- 《这些年我一直在路上》(I've been on the road a few years)
- 《如果大雪封门》 If a Snowstorm Seals the Door (tr. by Jeremy Tiang)
- 《时间简史》 A Brief History of Time (tr. by Eric Abrahamsen]
- 《露天电影》 Outdoor Film (tr. by Eric Abrahamsen]
- 《轮子是圆的》 Wheels are round (tr. by Eric Abrahamsen]
- 《雪夜访戴》 Visiting Dai on a Snowy Evening (tr. by Eric Abrahamsen]
- 《狗叫了一天》 The Dog's Been Barking All Day, July 2017 (tr. by Eric Abrahamsen]
- 《奔马》 Galloping Horses (tr. by Helen Wang)
- 《弃婴》 Throwing Out the Baby (tr. by Nicky Harman)
- 《镜与刀》 (Mirror and Knife)
- 《九年》 (Nine Years)
- 《忆秦娥》 Remembering Qin E (tr. by Jeremy Tiang)
