= Zhang Yueran =

Chinese writer (born 1982)

- 张悦然
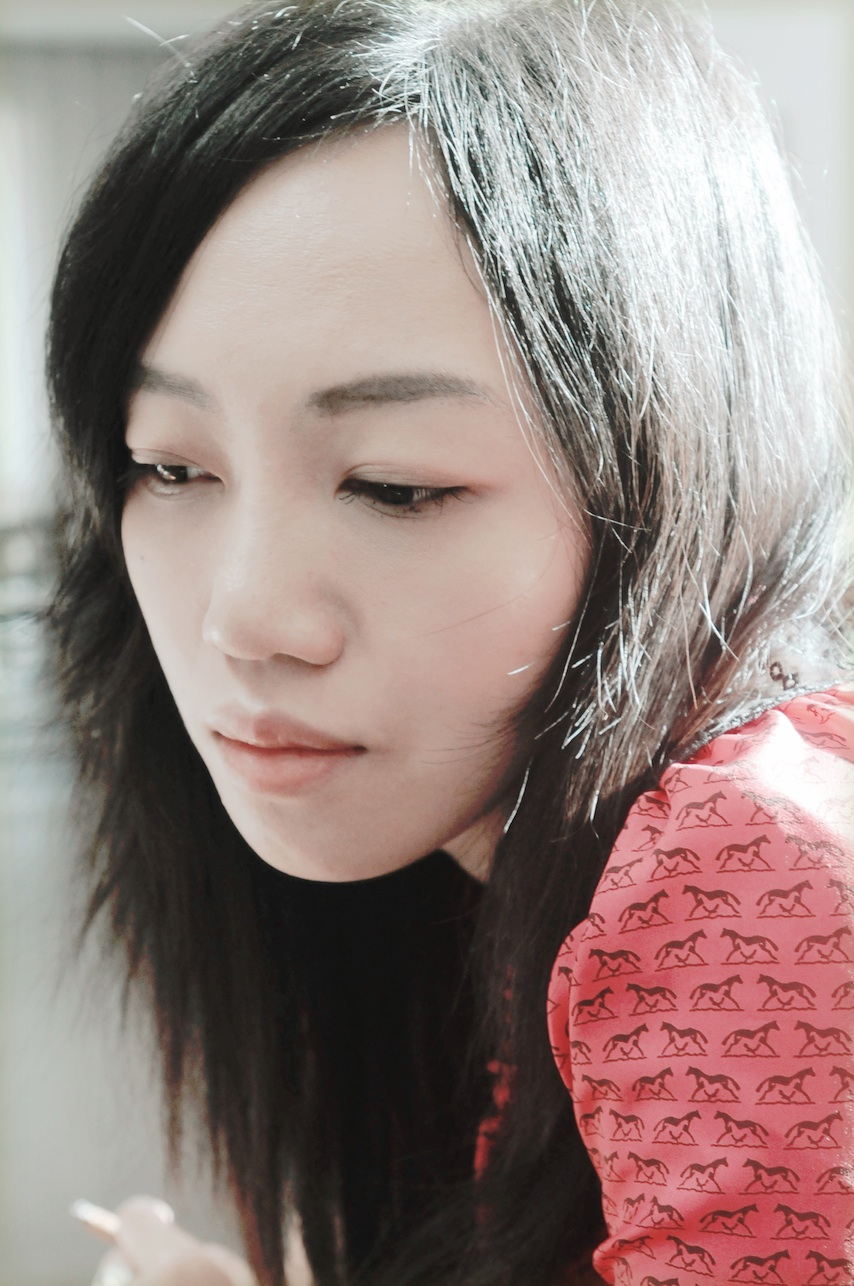
- Born: 张悦然; 7 November 1982 (age 44); Jinan, Shandong, China
- Education: Shandong University
- Occupations: Writer, teacher

Zhang Yueran (Chinese: 张悦然, pinyin: Zhāng Yuèrán; born 6 November 1982) is a Chinese writer.

== Biography ==
Zhang was born in 1982 in Jinan, Shandong. She is an only child. Her father was a professor at Shandong University, and he was very keen on literature.

Zhang is an alumnus of Shandong Experimental High School, Shandong University and National University of Singapore.

Her main works include short stories and novels. She won the 2001 New Concept Writing Competition organised by Mengya magazine. She is often labeled as part of a group of successful Chinese authors known as the "post-'80s" generation.

In 2011 she participated in the International Writing Program Fall Residency at the University of Iowa in Iowa City.

Currently, Zhang is a teacher of Literary Studies in Renmin University of China. Several of her works have been translated into English by Jeremy Tiang, as well as into various other languages.

== Personal Life ==
Zhang is married to the Chinese writer Shuang Xuetao. They met at the Renmin University of China.

She was previously married to Xu Lei, a painter and the art director of the Today Art Museum in Beijing.

== Works in English ==
- Ten Loves (2004)
- The Promise Bird (2006)
- Cocoon (2022)
- Women, Seated (2025)

== Works in Chinese (Partial) ==
- 《葵花走失在1890》 (Sunflowers Got Lost in 1890)
- 《樱桃之远》 (Cherry Story)
- 《是你来检阅我的忧伤了吗》 (You Come to My Sorrow)
- 《十爱》 (Ten Love Stories)
- 《水仙已乘鲤鱼去》 (Narcissus)
- 《誓鸟》 (Birds of Swear)
- 《鲤系列》 (Carp Series)
- 《昼若夜房间》 (A Room of Day and Night)
- 《茧》 (Cocoon)
- 《大乔小乔》 (Unseen Sister)
- 《顿悟时刻》 (Moment of Epiphany)
- 《天鹅旅馆》（Hotel Zwaan)
- 《动物形状的烟火》(Animal Shaped Fireworks)
- 《吉诺的跳马》(Jinuode Tiaoma)

== Adaptations ==
- Unseen Sisrer (大乔小乔) – adapted into the television series The Bright One (许我耀眼)。

Cast

- Zhao Lusi as Xu Yan
- Chen Weiting as Shen Haoming
- Wan Peng as Qiao Lin
- Tang Xiaotian as Yu Yiming
- Guan Ziqing as Lin Tao
- Zhong Yating as Fang Lei
- Wang Yiyao as Sun Siwei
- Xu Yajun as Shen Jinsong
- Wen Zhengrong as Yu Lan
- Fan Shiqi as Jiang Liang
- Feng Hui as Qiao Jianbin
- Liu Min as Wang Yazhen

and the work was also adapted into the film The Unseen Sister (2024), directed by Zhao Deyin.

Cast

- Zhao Liying,
- Xin Zhilei,
- Huang Jue
- Dong Baoshi.
