= Laure Feugère =

French art historian and curator (1933–2025)

Laure Feugère (née Brouillard) (1933–2025) was a French curator at the Musée Guimet, Paris, where she specialized in Indian arts, textiles and Central Asia.

== Life ==
Feugère was a curator in the Dept of Indian Arts at the MNAA-Guimet. She was also a loyal supporter of the European Society for Studies of Central Asia and Himalayan Regions (SEECHAC), since its foundation in 2007. She died on 18 April 2025, and is buried with her husband Guy and their son Bernard in the Cimetière des Gonards, Versailles, Paris.

== Awards and honours ==
- Chevalier des Arts et des Lettres (Knight of Arts and Letters)

== Publications ==
- 1989 "The Pelliot Collection", Orientations 20/3 (March 1989).
- 2002 Le pinceau de Bouddha (co-authored with Jacques Giès, and André Coutin, photography by Reza (Paris: La Martinière)
- 2002 Painted Buddhas of Xinjiang: hidden treasures from the Silk Road (co-authored with Jacques Giès, and André Coutin, photography by Reza, tr. Ian West) (Chicago : Art Media Resources)
- 2002 Problems of the restoration of a fragment of Kouang King illustration (MG 17 669), Manuscripta Orientalia 8/4 (December), pp. 32-37 (with Michel Cailleteau)
- 2010 Fleurs et oiseaux de Chine, a loan exhibition from the Musée Guimet, displayed at the Musée des arts asiatiques de Toulon, 23 April to 31 July 2010 (co-authored with Guillemette Coulomb)
- 2010 Textiles de Dunhuang dans les collections françaises (co-authored with Zhao Feng [series editor, ed.-in-chief], Nathalie Monnet, Wang Le, Arnaud Bertrand, and Xu Zheng (Shanghai: Donghua University Press)
- 2011 "Des poubelles aux vitrines: recherches récentes sur les tissus de Dunhuang", European Society for the Study of Central Asian and Himalayan Civilisations website. 17 Nov 2011. https://seechac.org/resume-de-la-conference-du-12-10-11/
