= China National Silk Museum =

National-level museum in Hangzhou, Zhejiang province, China

- Chinese: 中国丝绸博物馆
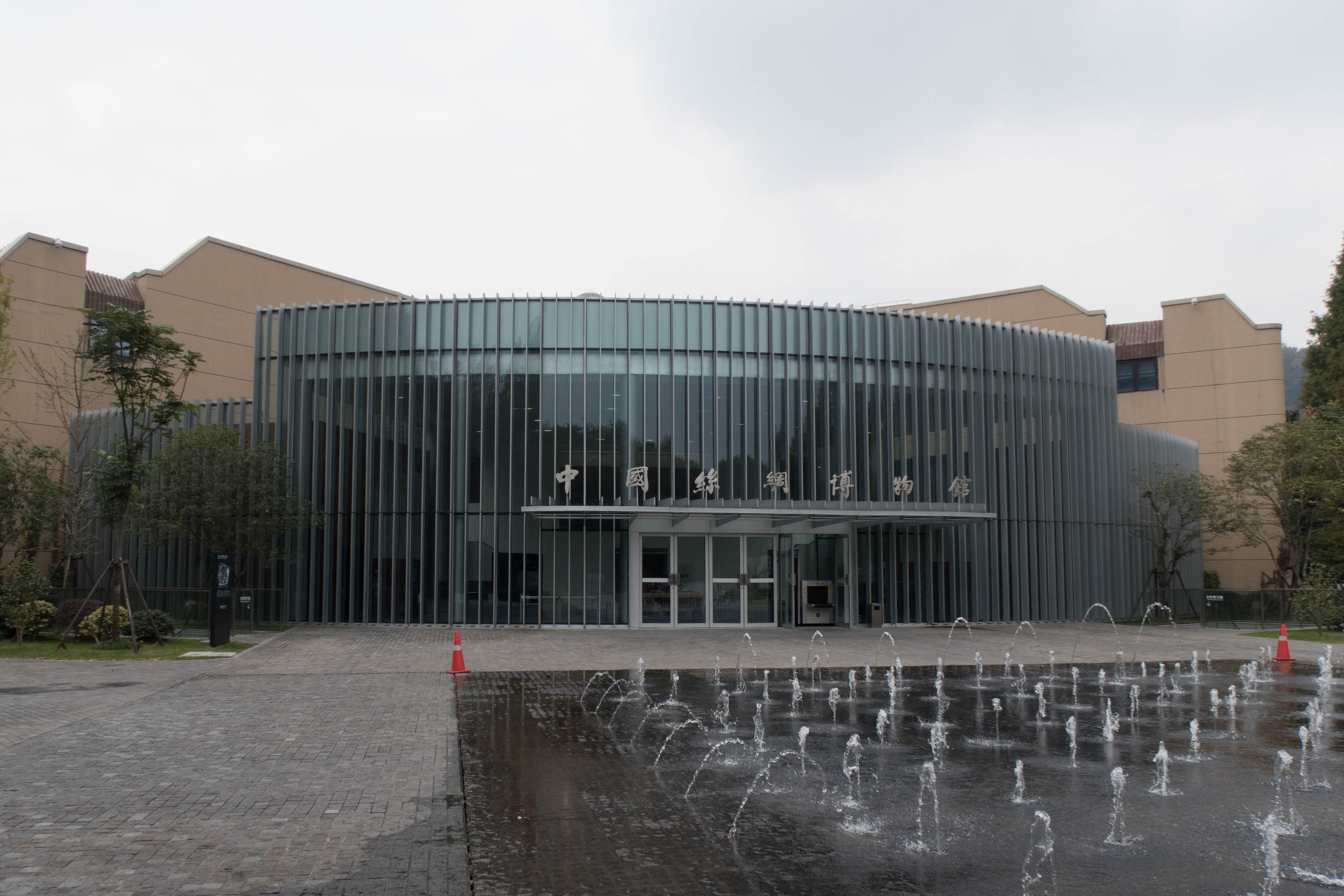
- China National Silk Museum Building in 2017

- Location within Zhejiang Location within China
- Established: 26 February 1992; 34 years ago
- Location: 73-1 Yuhuangshan Rd, Xihu, Hangzhou, Zhejiang, China
- Coordinates: 30°13′30″N 120°08′50″E
- Visitors: 1,692,697 (2023)
- Website: www.chinasilkmuseum.com/index_en.aspx

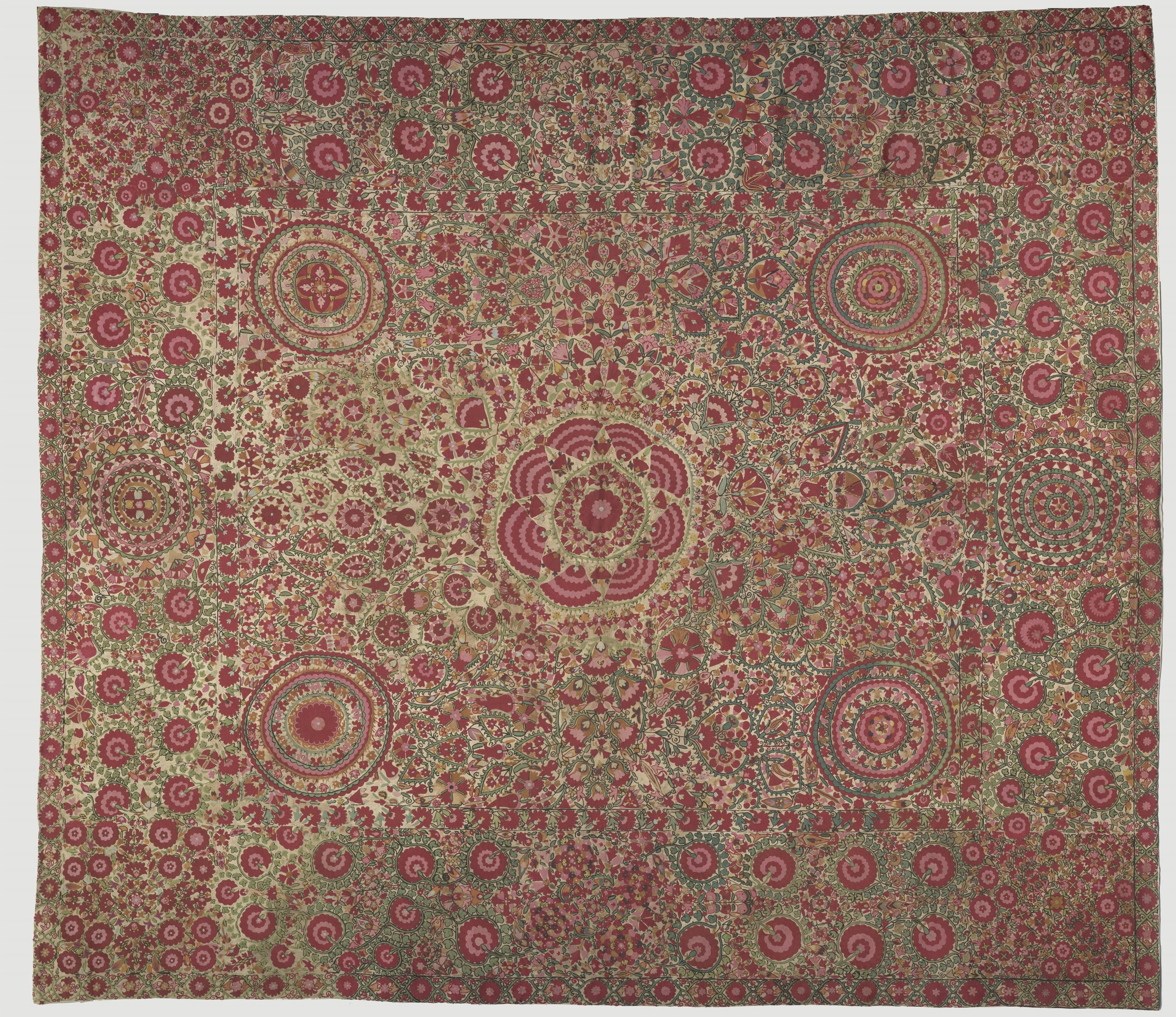
Wedding coverlet "suzani" from the collection of the China National Silk Museum. Ura-Tyube, 19th century.

The China National Silk Museum (Chinese: 中国丝绸博物馆) is a national-level museum in Hangzhou, Zhejiang province, China.

== About the Museum ==
The China National Silk Museum (CNSM), near the West Lake, in Hangzhou, is one of the first national-level museums in China and the largest silk museum in the world, covering an area of 50,000 square meters and a building area of 8,000 square meters. It opened on February 26, 1992, and was extensively refurbished in 2015–2016. As the largest specialized museum on textiles in China, the main goal of CNSM is to research and conserve Chinese textile relics. In 2010, it became the home of the Chinese Center for Textile Identification and Conservation (founded 2000).

The Museum has several permanent galleries, including “The Story of Chinese Silk”, “Sericulture and Silk Craftsmanship in China”, a “Textile Conservation Gallery”, and the “Xinyou Archive Center”.

The China National Silk Museum is a research museum, and has a number of visiting professors and scholars, including Professor Claudio Zanier, Birgitte Samsøe Crawfurd, Suzanne Louise Campion Crawford, Nidaullah Sehrai, Fazal Dad Kaker, and Sanjay Garg.

The Chinese Costume Festival, also called the Hanfu Festival, is an annual event that is held at the museum. Every year since 2018, the festival features a different theme based on a specific dynasty in Chinese history. In 2019, the festival won a Chinese Museum Association award for being one of the most innovative in China.

== Special exhibitions ==
The following is a selection of recent exhibitions. These cover a range of themes, showing the museum's own collections, loaned collections, the museum's scientific and conservation work and archaeological textiles.

- Glory on Silk: French Textiles (1700 to the Present) (Oct 2017 – Dec 2017)
- Historia Secret: Historic Secrets of Women's wear (Nov 2017 – Mar 2018)
- Silk and Tradition: China and Central & Eastern Europe Contemporary art silk (Sept 2017)
- Qian Family's Wardrobe: Costume Found in the Tomb of Qian Zhang (1486–1505) and his wife (Sep-Nov 2017)
- New Knowledge on Ancient Road: Silk Road Cultural Heritage Sci-tech Achievements (Jun–Oct 2017)
- The Sound of Silk: Costumes found in the Tomb of Zhao Boyun (1155–1216) (May–Sept 2017)
- Brocade and Embroidery Culture of Zhuang Nationality in Guangxi (Mar–Jun 2017)
- Blooming: The Past and the Present of Lace (Mar–May 2017)
- Transform Into Butterfly —— 2016 Fashion Review (Dec 2016 – Feb 2017)
- A World of Silks: International Silk Art Exhibition (Sep–Dec 2016)
- Silks from the Silk Road: Origin, Transmission and Exchange (Sep–Oct 2015)

== Silk Road textiles ==
The director of the museum, Zhao Feng, is a specialist in Silk Road textiles and the leader of a national research project on textiles from Dunhuang. This has resulted in three volumes so far: Textiles from Dunhuang in UK Collections, Textiles from Dunhuang in French Collections, and Textiles from Dunhuang in Russian Collections. In 2015 he founded the International Association for the Study of Silk Road Textiles (IASSRT) and was its first president, organising the Association's first conference in Hangzhou in 2016, and co-organising the Association's second conference in Lyon in 2017.
