= Jeremy Tiang =

Singaporean writer, translator and playwright

- Born: 17 January 1977 (age 49); Singapore
- Website: jeremytiang.com

Jeremy Tiang (born 17 January 1977) is a Singaporean writer, translator and playwright based in New York City. Tiang won the 2018 Singapore Literature Prize for English fiction for his debut novel, State of Emergency, published in 2017.

== Early life ==
Tiang is multiracial. His mother is from Malaysia, and his father is part Sri Lankan Tamil. Growing up, his home language was English. Having been exposed to Cantonese, Tamil, and English from a young age, Tiang has spoken about taking plurilinguilism for granted. Despite his English proficiency, he chose to attend a Chinese language high school.

== Career ==
In 2009, Tiang won the National Arts Council's (NAC) Golden Point Award for English fiction for his story Trondheim.

In 2016, his short story collection It Never Rains on National Day was shortlisted for the Singapore Literature Prize.

In 2010, Tiang's idea for his first novel, titled State of Emergency qualified for a grant by the NAC. Under the Creation Grant Scheme, he would receive a total of $12,000. It took him seven years to write the novel but when he submitted the first draft to the council in 2016, the remainder of the grant was withdrawn – he had received $8,600 by then. At that time, Tiang was shocked as he was writing full-time and any additional money would be useful but decided to keep writing. His manuscript was subsequently shortlisted for the 2016 Epigram Books Fiction Prize where he received a cash prize of $5,000. In 2017, during a Parliament of Singapore's session, Non-constituency Member of Parliament, Dennis Tan, questioned why NAC withdrew the funding, Minister for Culture, Community and Youth, Grace Fu, replied that the book was not what was mutually agreed upon and hence the withdrawal of subsequent funds. On Tan's further asking whether Tiang failed to deliver the book as promised and what is the failed fulfilment, Fu did not further elaborate on details.

In 2014 his play The Last Days of Limehouse about the London's first Chinatown in the East End of London was staged by the New Earth Theatre as a promenade performance in the Limehouse Town Hall.

In 2018, he won the Singapore Literature Prize for English fiction for his debut novel State of Emergency (2017). The Singapore Book Council which established and managed the Singapore Literature Prize said that Tiang's win was a "unanimous decision" by the judges.

In 2023 Tiang chaired the jury for the National Book Award for Translated Literature.

In 2025 Tiang won the Obie Award in the category "Outstanding New Play" for his play Salesman之死, presented by Yangtze Repertory Theatre and Gung Ho Projects.

== Personal life ==
Tiang is queer, and uses he/they pronouns.

He lives in Flushing, Queens.

== Bibliography ==
=== Novels ===
- State of Emergency (Epigram Books, 2017)

=== Short story collections ===
- It Never Rains on National Day (Epigram Books, 2015)

=== Translations ===
- Unrest – novel by Yeng Pway Ngon (Math Paper Press, 2012)
- The Promise Bird – novel by Zhang Yueran (Math Paper Press, 2012)
- Ten Loves – short story collection by Zhang Yueran (Math Paper Press, 2012)
- Island of Silence – novel by Su Wei-chen (Ethos Books, 2013)
- Durians Are Not the Only Fruit: Notes from the Tropics – essays by Wong Yoon Wah (Epigram Books, 2013)
- The Book of Mountains and Rivers – essays by Yu Qiuyu (CN Times Books, 2015)
- Death by Perfume – short story collection by You Jin (Epigram Books, 2015)
- The Borrowed – novel by Chan Ho-kei (Grove Atlantic, 2017)
- The City of Sand – novel by Tianxia Bachang (Delacorte Press, 2017)
- Never Grow Up – memoir by Jackie Chan with Zhu Mo (Simon & Schuster, 2018)
- The Dragon Ridge Tombs – novel by Tianxia Bachang (Delacorte Press, 2018)
- Coloratura – novel by Li Er (University of Oklahoma Press, 2019)
- Costume – novel by Yeng Pway Ngon (Balestier Press, 2019)
- Second Sister – novel by Chan Ho-kei (Grove Atlantic, 2020)
- Strange Beasts of China – novel by Yan Ge (Tilted Axis Press, 2020)
- The Wedding Party – novel by Liu Xinwu (Amazon Crossing, 2021)
- Faraway – novel by Lo Yi-chin (Columbia University Press, 2021) – longlisted for the PEN Translation Prize 2022
- The Secret Talker – novel by Yan Geling (HarperVia, 2021)
- Nine Color Deer – picture book by Duan Kailin (Levine Querido, 2022)
- The Artisans: The Legacy of the Ancestors of Shen Village – non-fiction book by Shen Fuyu (Astra House, 2022)
- Rouge Street – three novellas by Shuang Xuetao (Metropolitan Books, 2022)
- Cocoon – novel by Zhang Yueran (World Editions, 2022)
- Ninth Building – novel by Zou Jingzhi (Honford Star, 2022) – longlisted for the International Booker Prize 2023
- Bearing Word – novel by Liu Liangcheng (Balestier Press, 2023)
- Beijing Sprawl – short story collection by Xu Zechen (co-translated with Eric Abrahamsen, Two Lines Press, 2023)
- Delicious Hunger – short story collection by Hai Fan (Tilted Axis Press, 2024)
- Invisible Kitties – novel by Yu Yoyo (HarperVia, 2024)
- Hunter – short story collection by Shuang Xuetao (Granta Magazine Editions, 2025)
- Women, Seated – novel by Zhang Yueran (Riverhead Books, 2025)
- The Formosa Exchange – novel by Huang Chong-kai (Honford Star, 2026)
- To the East of the East – novel by Ping Lu (World Editions, 2026) – longlisted for the National Book Award for Translated Literature 2026
- Night Train – novel by Xu Zechen (Two Lines Press, 2026)
- The Women – non-fiction book by Yan Lianke (Verso, 2026)
- The Colour of Twilight – novel by Yeng Pway Ngon (City Book Room, 2026)
- The Family Plot – novel by Yan Lianke (Grove Atlantic, 2027)
