= Yan Ge =

Chinese writer (born 1984)

- 颜歌
- Born: Dai Yuexing; December 1984 (age 41); Chengdu, Sichuan, China
- Education: Sichuan University
- Occupations: Novelist, writer
- Writing career
- Language: Standard Chinese, Sichuanese, English
- Notable work: Our Family

Yan Ge (Chinese: 颜歌, pinyin: Yán Gē, born December 1984) is the pen name of Chinese writer Dai Yuexing (戴月行, pinyin: Dài Yuèxíng).

== Life and career ==
Yan Ge was born Dai Yuexing in December 1984 in the Pixian district of Chengdu. She began writing at the age of ten and her first book was published when she was 17 years old.

Yan completed a PhD in comparative literature at Sichuan University and is the Chair of the China Young Writers Association. Her writing includes substantial amounts of her native Sichuanese, rather than Standard Chinese. People's Literature (Renmin Wenxue 人民文学) magazine recently chose her – in a list reminiscent of The New Yorker's '20 under 40' – as one of China's twenty future literary masters. In 2012, she was chosen as Best New Writer by the prestigious Chinese Literature Media Prize (华语文学传媒大奖 最佳新人奖). In 2011, she was awarded a visiting scholar position at Duke University. Yan was a guest writer at the Crossing Border Festival in The Hague in November 2012, and has since appeared at numerous literary festivals throughout Europe. She has lived in Dublin with her husband, Daniel, and their child since 2015.

Yan has been writing in English in addition to Mandarin and Sichuanese. Her first English book is a 2023 short story collection Elsewhere: stories. Reviewer Chelsea Leu wrote

Yan Ge’s English debut is preoccupied with language, its failures, and its relationship to human emotions and the raw reality – the 'food' – of life. ... These stories map out the distance between the head and the gut – the way language can fail to convey the deepest, most visceral facts of life."

Reviewer Sindya Bhanoo wrote that the stories "explore the power of language across the Chinese diaspora to either bring people together or push them apart."

== Awards ==
- 2003 - Chinese Literature Media Award
- 2002 - 1st prize, New Concept Writing Competition
- 2001 - Honored as one of China's Top 10 Young Fiction Writers by the Lu Xun Literature School of the China Writers Association

== Publications ==
- 五月女王 May Queen, 2008 - novel
- 钟腻哥 Sissy Zhong - short story (translated by Nicky Harman)
- 白马 White Horse - novella (translated by Nicky Harman)
- 照妖镜 Demon-Reflecting Mirror- novella
- 平乐镇伤心故事集 Sad Stories of Pingle Township (5 stories including White Horse and Demon-Reflecting Mirror).
- 我们家 Our Family, 2013.
  - English translation: The Chilli Bean Paste Clan, translated by Nicky Harman, Balestier Press, 2018; also German and French editions.
- 异兽志 Record of Strange Beasts, 2006.
  - English translation: Strange Beasts of China, translated by Jeremy Tiang, Melville House Publishing, 2021.
- Elsewhere: stories, 2023 - short stories. Scribner (US) and Faber (UK) ISBN 978-1-9821-9848-0 (published in English)
