= Charles Onunaiju =

Nigerian scholar

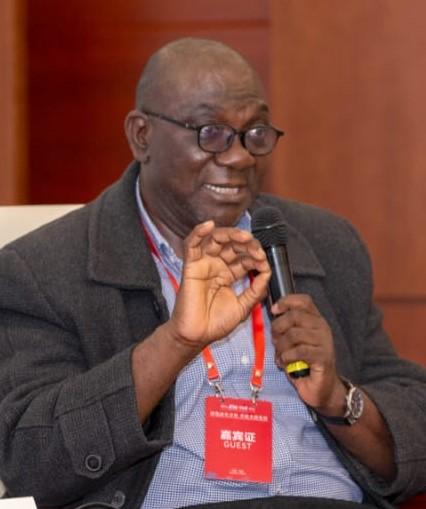
- Charles in 2024
- Born: December 5, 1964 (age 61); Mgbidi, Imo State, Nigeria
- Occupations: Scholar, author, journalist
- Organization: Centre for China Studies
- Known for: China–Africa relations
- Awards: Special Book Award of China (2016)
- Website: ccs-ng.org

Charles Onunaiju (born 5 December 1964) is a Nigerian scholar, author, and commentator on China–Africa relations. He founded and directs the Centre for China Studies (CCS), an Abuja-based think tank established in 2015 that researches China's political and economic systems and their engagement with Africa.

== Early life ==
Onunaiju was born in Mgbidi, Imo State, Nigeria.

== Career ==
Onunaiju worked as a journalist, heading foreign affairs desks at Nigerian newspapers such as Daily Trust and Leadership. In 2015, he established CCS, which publishes the ChinAfrica newsletter and organizes events on the Forum on China-Africa Cooperation (FOCAC) and Belt and Road Initiative (BRI).

He has lectured on China-Africa relations at Nigeria's National Defence College and participated in BRI-related forums in China. Onunaiju has been quoted in media discussions on BRI infrastructure projects in Africa, COVID-19 origins inquiries, and bilateral ties.

In 2016, he received the Special Book Award of China. In 2019, he was appointed to the International Advisory Committee of the China-Africa Institute in Beijing. He holds affiliations including adjunct scholar at Zhejiang Normal University's Institute of African Studies and membership in the China-Africa Think Tanks Forum.

== Selected publications ==
Onunaiju has authored books on China-Africa relations and China's modernization, including:

- China and Nigeria in World Affairs (2008)
- China/Africa: Issues, Challenges and Possibilities (2012)
- China and the Struggle for Modernization: From Revolution to Reform (2016)
- A Century of the Communist Party of China: Why Africa Should Engage its Experience (2021)
- Prospects for Modernization In Africa: A Contribution Of Xi Jinping Thought (2026)
