= Strange Beasts of China =

2006 novel by Yan Ge

- Author: Yan Ge
- Translator: Jeremy Tiang
- Language: Mandarin Chinese
- Genre: Science Fiction, Fantasy
- Published: 2006 (Chinese), 2020 (English), 2021(English)
- Publisher: Tilted Axis Press (2020) Melville House Publishing (2021)
- Publication place: China
- Media type: Book
- Pages: 220
- ISBN: 978-1612199092
- Originally 异兽志 "Record of Strange Beasts"

Strange Beasts of China (Chinese: 异兽志; pinyin: Yì shòu zhì) is a science fiction novel written by Chinese author Yan Ge. It was originally published in 2006. The English translation, translated by Jeremy Tiang, was published in 2021 by Tilted Axis Press. Written in the first person, the story follows an unnamed amateur cryptozoologist who tracks down and writes stories about the numerous species of beast in the fictional city of Yong'an, China.

== Style ==
The novel is written in the style of magical realism, similar to the writing of Italo Calvino's Cosmicomics. The setting is based on a recognizable, contemporary urban environment in China, augmented and enhanced by the presence of the various beasts described by the narrator.

The Washington Post's review of the novel described it as a modern, urbanized form of the Chinese classic The Classic of Mountains and Seas. In China, Strange Beasts of China was adapted into a TV series. The author commented in an interview she was aware that Chinese censorship laws would change some elements of her story in the series, and had come to terms with it as she had written and published the book more than a decade before the TV series began.

== Plot summary ==
The novel features an unnamed narrator in the city of Yong'an, a large industrial city. One feature that sets Yong'an apart from other large cities in China is the presence of different sorts of beasts. The unnamed narrator is a self-identified cryptozoologist. She was a zoology student who eventually dropped out of school and now makes a living as a journalist writing beast stories. The story is told chronologically, with each chapter focusing on a different species of beast. When she is not tracking down stories of beasts, the narrator is chain-smoking and drinking, alone or with company, at the Dolphin bar.

Throughout the novel, the narrator meets and, inevitably, becomes emotionally involved with each type of beast. Along with the narrator, other significant characters are her cousin, cousin's daughter (her "niece") Lucia, past professor, and professor's assistant Zhong Liang. As the story progresses, there is a tense love-hate relationship fostered between the narrator and her professor. She grows closer to Zhong Liang, the professor's new assistant. As the plot line progresses and new types of beasts are introduced, layers of connection and involvement between the narrator's friends and certain beasts are unveiled and explored. The exposure of how beasts can be involved in so many aspects of the narrator's life starts to break down the artificial separation between humans and beasts as the narrator questions her identity and the identity of the human race itself.

=== Beasts ===
There are nine types of beasts introduced: sorrowful beasts, joyful beasts, sacrificial beasts, impasse beasts, flourishing beasts, thousand league beasts, heartsick beasts, prime beasts, and returning beasts. At the end of each section, the narrator concludes with the statement, "otherwise, they are just like regular people."

- Sorrowful beasts have "scales on the insides of their left calves and fins attached to their right ears. The skin around their belly buttons is dark green." The defining characteristic of sorrowful beasts is that they cannot smile. If a sorrowful beast smiles, it dies. Because female sorrowful beast can mate with male humans to produce human children, female sorrowful beasts became a sort of prize and a symbol of status for rich men in Yong'an. Male sorrowful beasts are believed to be unable to mate with humans, so the dexterous male beasts can be found working as textile weavers. Their attractive female counterparts tend to be retail saleswomen. These female sorrowful beasts, once married off to humans, are forced to take hormone shots to suppress their primal nature. However, they retain the beastly habit of squawking for the three days during a full moon, losing the ability to speak.
- Joyful beasts are parasitic to humans, usually feeding off children. They live for a very long time, and eventually leave their hosts in the form of a phoenix. They are distinct from sorrowful beasts in that they actually appear happy most of the time.
- Sacrificial beasts get their name from the legend that they sacrificed themselves a long time ago so that humans could inherit the world. The sacrificial beasts in present time live in a vicious cycle of self-destruction that ultimately leads to death.
- Impasse beasts feed on human despair. Like parasites, they absorb despair from humans, causing their hair to grow from the nourishment. When an impasse beast is killed, all of the despair that it devoured is released.
- Flourishing beasts are grown like plants. When a flourishing beast dies, it is cut into eight pieces and buried like a seed. New beasts begin to grow from the plant, but if they do not grow into maturity, they are cut down and turned into furniture that is highly valued by humans.
- Thousand league beasts, commonly believed to be extinct, are rumored to be able to see into the future. This foresight caused catastrophe, as there was intense trauma associated with the ability to know what is going to happen before it happens—whether one wants to or not.
- Heartsick beasts are not naturally found beasts, but they are manufactured by humans. They act as role models for human children. After a certain period of time, the beasts are removed from their companion child and the family. These beasts are bought from stores, and upon ordering, the child gets to choose the face of the created beast.
- Prime beasts live for short periods of time, but endure great suffering. To try to save their offspring from suffering, prime beast mothers murder their children. If the children survive, they grow up to kill and devour their parents' flesh.
- Returning beasts are rumored to live under the city of Yong'an, where they take care of the "city of the dead."

== Themes ==
The novel can be interpreted as a social commentary on society's mistreatment and control over minority groups. The beasts are treated as an other-group due to their differences and are forced to fit into a human-dominated society. Beasts that do not serve a function are killed, while those that do are exploited, i.e. for their flesh, sexual use, and labor. The book questions human nature and whether humanity is what makes people moral along with questioning morality in general.

The novel also draws from themes found within Buddhism, including allusions to the six realms in Buddhism, specifically the realm that contains animals. This is the only realm visible by humans - the unnamed narrator would be witnessing a domain of samsara when writing her accounts of the beasts.

== Translation ==
This book was originally published in 2006 in Chinese, and was translated into English in 2021 by Jeremy Tiang. Although the English translation of the book was well received, there are criticisms with how the book is translated, such as the lack of footnotes to explain culture specific references. Notable examples include the character, Zhong Kui, the name of a famous demon killer in Chinese mythology. Another pun in the Chinese language version are two characters named "Cloud" and "Rain" - the phrase "clouds and rain" is a euphemism for sex in Chinese, a detail that is not clearly conveyed in translation.

Additionally, each chapter begins with a brief description of the beast which, in the original writing, was written in Classical Chinese, while the rest of the book was written in standard Chinese. However, the English translation made no distinction between the language at the beginning of each chapter and the remainder of the text. Additionally, the original version had a strong Sichuanese dialect which gave it a distinct style compared to standard Mandarin; however, this distinction in dialectal difference was not conveyed by Tiang in the English translation.

== Critical reception ==
Strange Beasts of China has been well received by critics, appearing on both The New York Times Book Review's list of 100 Notable Books of 2021 and The Washington Post's list of Best science fiction, fantasy and horror of 2021. It was also a runner-up for the 2021 Warwick Prize for Women in Translation.
