= Special Book Award of China =

Annual award to recognize foreign writers

- Sponsored by: State Press and Publication Administration of the People's Republic of China
- Country: China
- Status: Active
- First award: 2005

The Special Book Award of China (中华图书特殊贡献奖) is an annual award established by the State Press and Publication Administration of the People's Republic of China in 2005. The award recognizes foreign translators, writers, and publishers who have made significant contributions to introducing China, translating and publishing Chinese books, and promoting cultural exchanges between China and foreign countries. The awards are typically announced around the time of the Beijing International Book Fair. The prize has evolved to include two main categories: the main Special Book Award of China for experienced scholars and the Special Book Award for Young Scholars, established around 2017 to honor promising young academics and translators. As of the 18th cycle (2025), approximately 219 individuals from 63 different countries have received the award, including notable recipients such as Princeton Professor Martin Kern (2025) and Italian Sinologist Silvia Pozzi (2024).

"The awards are China's top publication prize that honors foreigners for making great contributions to the introduction and promotion of China, Chinese culture and Chinese publications to the world."

== Recipients ==
=== 2011 ===
- B. R. Deepak, Indian Sinologist.

=== 2014 ===
At the 8th annual event, the recipients were:

- Frederico Massini, Sinologist, Confucius Centre director, Italy
- Jo Lusby, Managing Director, Penguin Books North Asia
- Masafumi Yamada, President, Oriental Bookstore, Japan
- Vladislav Bajac, Founder, Geopoetika and Vice-President, PEN Serbia
- David R Knechtges, Sinologist, USA
- Liljana Arsovsk, Translator, Mexico
- Sidney Shapiro, Translator and Writer, China/America

=== 2015 ===
At the 9th annual event, the recipients were:

- Colin Patrick Mackerras, Australian Sinologist and writer.
- John Makeham, Australian translator and professor of Sinology.
- Lisa Carducci, Canadian writer.
- Francois Cheng, Chinese French translator and writer.
- Joël Bellassen, French Sinologist.
- Helwig Schmidt-Glintzer, German Sinologist.
- Wilt Idema, Dutch translator and Sinologist.
- Keo Mackaphonh, Laotian writer.
- Menerel Chimedtseye, Mongolian translator and professor.
- Adam Marszalek, Polish publisher.
- Leonard Perelomov, Russian Sinologist and translator.
- Marina Čarnogurská, Slovakian translator.
- Angel Fernandez, Spanish publisher.
- Robert Baensch, American publisher.
- Guy Salvatore Alitto, American Sinologist.

Youth Awards were presented to:

- Ahmed Sayyid, Egyptian publisher.
- Kaung Min, Burmese translator.
- Zombory Klara, Hungarian translator.
- Samir Ahmed, Jordanian writer and translator.
- Eric Abrahamsen, American translator.

=== 2016 ===
- Charles Onunaiju

=== 2017 ===
At the 11th annual event, there were 20 awards including 4 for Young Scholars. Recipients included:

- Mohamad Elkhatib, Lebanese publisher.
- Richard Charkin, British publisher.
- Iljaz Spahiu, Albanian translator.
- Alicia Relinque, Spanish translator.
- Paul White, English translator.
- Petko Hinov, Bulgarian sinologist, translator of Dream of the Red Chamber into Bulgarian.
- Harold Weldon, Australian Publisher

=== 2018 ===
At the 12th annual event, there were 15 awards. Recipients included:

- Andrzej Kacperski, Polish publisher.
- Staburova Jelena, Latvian researcher of Chinese language and literature.
- The Nepali translator of Xi Jinping: The Governance of China, vol. 1.
- The Uzbek translator of Xi Jinping: The Governance of China, vol. 1.
- Kalmar Eva, Hungarian literary translator of Journey to the West and other works.
- Olivia Milburn, British translator of spy novelist Mai Jia's works Decoded and In the Dark.
- Balan Luminita Rodica, Romanian translator.

=== 2019 ===
At the 13th annual event, the recipients were:

- Bonnie Suzanne McDougall, Australian translator and academic.
- Daniel Bell, Canadian academic, author of The China Model: Political Meritocracy and the Limits of Democracy.
- Yuri Tavrovskiy, Russian historian, author of Xi Jinping: Governance Thought in Shape, the first book published in Russia about paramount leader Xi Jinping.
- Ioan Budura, Romanian translator, translator of two volumes of Xi Jinping: The Governance of China.
- Fabian Lebenglik, Argentinian publisher, president of Adriana Hidalgo Editora.
- Sotiris Chalikias, Greek translator of Chinese philosophy.
- András Sándor Kocsis, Hungarian publisher, including The Hungary Chinese and Chinese Hungary Dictionary.
- Abbas Kdaimy, Iraqi translator and editor, translator of Xi Jinping: Governance of China vol. 1 into Arabic.
- Yuri Pines, Israeli academic, author of Envisioning Eternal Empire: Chinese Political Thought Of The Warring States Era.
- Seken Aday, Kazakh academic and translator, especially of Chinese social scientists.
- Hong Jungsun, Korean academic and publisher, including Chinese Modern Literature and Modernisation.
- Leopold Moravcik. Slovak writer, including China on the Long March.

Youth awards were presented to:

- Yara El Masri, Egypt.
- Stefan Christ, German translator of contemporary Chinese theatre.
- Kiran Gautam, Nepali.

=== 2020 ===
At the 14th annual event, the recipients were:

- Gustavo Alejandro Girado, Argentina
- Hamar Imre, Hungary
- Grzegorz Kolodko, Poland
- Artem Igorevich Kobzev, Russia
- Do Tien Sam, Vietnam
- Nama Didier Dieudonne, Cameroon
- Giorgio Casacchia, Italy
- Baktygul Rysbaevna Kalambekova, Kyrgyzstan
- Lennart Lundberg, Sweden
- Nicky Harman, UK
- William H. Nienhauser, Jr., USA
- Niels Peter Thomas, Germany
- Pierre Herzel Lavi, Israel
- Bassam Chebaro, Lebanon
- Duretic Jagos, Syria

=== 2021 ===
At the 15th annual event, the recipients were:

- Jerusha Hull McCormack, Ireland
- Maxime Vias, French
- David Ferguson, UK
- Laurence Brahm, USA
- Terry Robinson, UK
- Michael Lackner, Germany
- Boldbaatar Dorgsuren, Mongolia
- Syed Hasan Javed, Pakistan
- Veronica Bonilla, Ecuador
- Lee Hee Ok, Korea
- Long Anzhi, USA
- Lang Yu, Germany
- Hishinuma Yoshiaki, Japan
- Igor Radev, North Macedonia
- Burov Vladilen, Russia
- Mesfer Falah Alsubaly, Saudi Arabia
- Phua Kok Khoo, Singapore

=== 2022 ===
At the 16th annual event, the recipients were:

- Dinesh Kulatunga, Sri Lankan writer
- Elias Jabbour, Brazilian professor
