= Tan Swie Hian =

Singaporean multidisciplinary artist (born 1943)

- 陈瑞献
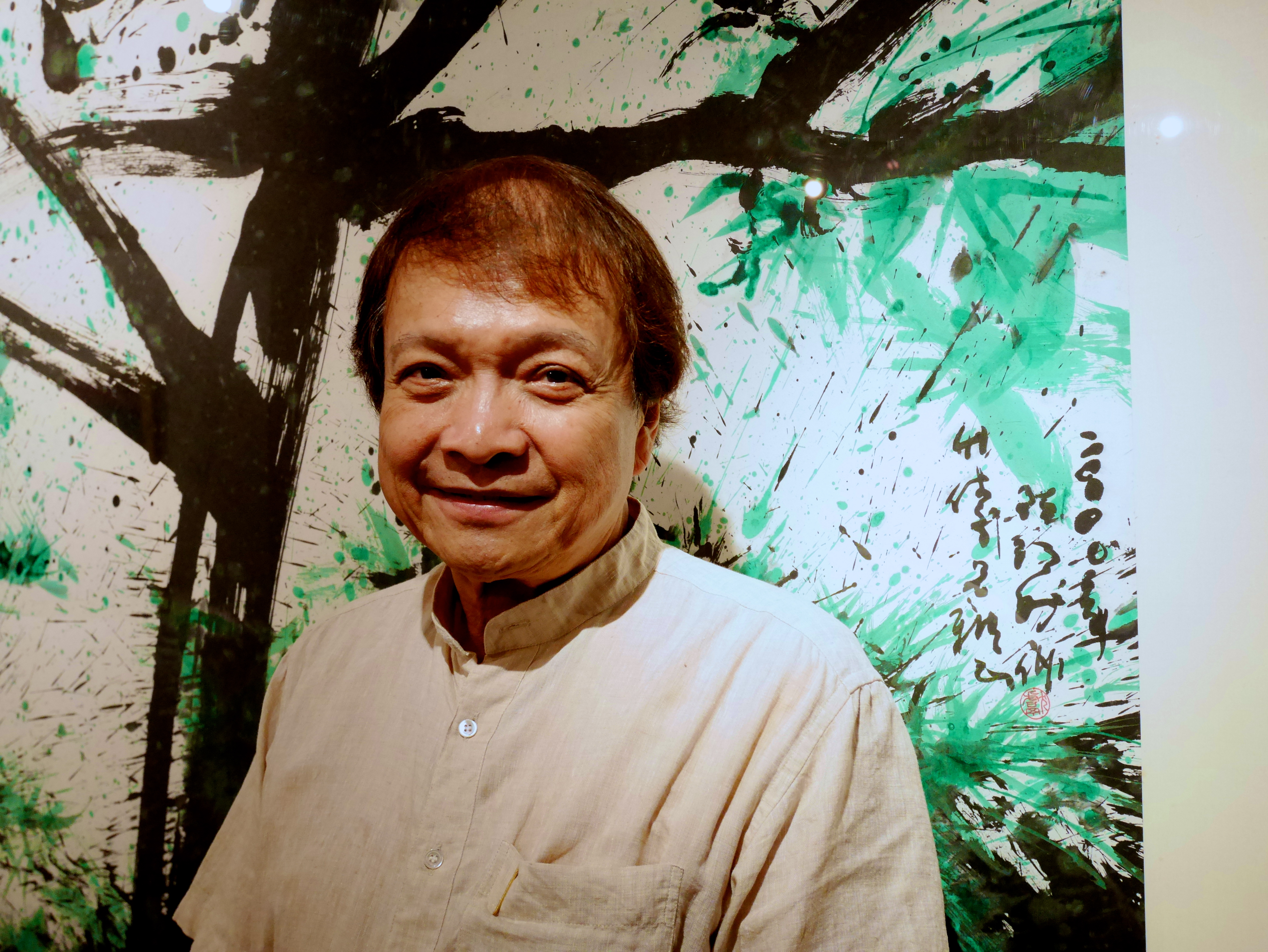
- Tan in 2014
- Born: 5 May 1943 (age 82); Halang Island, Indonesia
- Alma mater: Nanyang University; Current National University of Singapore
- Known for: Contemporary ink wash painting
- Website: tanswiehian.sg

Tan Swie Hian (simplified Chinese: 陈瑞献; traditional Chinese: 陳瑞獻; pinyin: Chén Ruì Xiàn; Pe̍h-ōe-jī: Tân Suī-hiàn) is a Singaporean multidisciplinary artist known for his contemporary Chinese calligraphy, Chinese poetry and contemporary art sculptures found in Singapore and many parts of the world.

== Early life ==
Born in Indonesia, Tan migrated to Singapore circa 1946. He grew up with a fluency in Chinese and Malay, and went on to study English and French at Nanyang University. He began his career as a press attaché for the French Embassy in Singapore, after graduating with a degree in English literature from the university. While working as an attaché, he continued pursuing his passion for art. His first foray into the Singapore arts scene was with his first collection of poetry writings titled The Giant in 1968 and held his first art exhibition at the National Library on Stamford Road in 1973. He also converted his faith to Buddhism that year; his newfound spiritual experience outweighed his passion for the arts that made him give up painting for the next four years. It was only when the then–French Embassy cultural attaché Michel Deverge threatened to end their friendship if he did not pursue his art again, that Tan resume painting. Deverge went on to organize a successful exhibition of Tan's new creations at the Paul Gauguin Museum in Tahiti. After 24 years with the embassy, Tan left his position to pursue art full-time.

== Writing ==
Since his first poetry collection The Giant in 1968, Tan has authored 35 publications of poetry, essays and stories. In 1978, Tan was conferred with France's Chevalier of the Ordre des Arts et des Lettres for his initiatory Chinese translations of works by Samuel Beckett and Romanian writer Marin Sorescu. In 1987, he was awarded the Cultural Medallion in Singapore. In 1998, he won the Marin Sorescu International Poetry Prize in Romania.

== Painting ==
Tan has been recognised as Singapore's most expensive artist after he sold his oil-and-acrylic painting, When the Moon Is Orbed, for approximately S$3.7m at an auction in Beijing in 2012. In 2014, he surpassed his previous record after his ink on rice paper work entitled Portrait of Bada Shanren sold for S$4.4m.

In October 2014, Tan completed a painting of former Prime Minister Lee Kuan Yew and his late wife Kwa Geok Choo entitled A Couple. The painting, which took Tan five years to complete, was partially damaged by a fire in 2013. It depicts Lee and Kwa in their youth, is based on a 1946 black-and-white photograph of the couple in the University of Cambridge, and incorporates in its background Tan's poem written in memory of Kwa. Tan said, "I've always felt [Madam Kwa] was a great woman who, despite her intelligence and capability, was also a humble and dedicated wife." A Couple was purchased by art collector Wu Hsioh Kwang.

== Controversy ==
In 2012, Chinese-language novelist Yeng Pway Ngon was ordered to pay $10,000 in damages and $20,000 in costs to Tan. Tan had accused Yeng of libelling him in a 2005 letter which the latter had sent to The Straits Times and the National Arts Council.
