= B. R. Deepak =

Indian sinologist

- Spouse: Wang Yao

Academic background
- Education: Jawaharlal Nehru University (B.A., M.A.); Jawaharlal Nehru University (PhD)

B. R. Deepak (Chinese: 狄伯杰; pinyin: Dí Bójié) is an Indian sinologist. He received the Special Book Award of China for a book of translations of Chinese poetry into Hindi, becoming the first Indian to receive China's highest literary award.

== Biography ==
Deepak studied at Peking University in Beijing, China from 1991 to 1993, and in 1996 studied as a Jawaharlal Nehru Fellow at the Chinese Academy of Social Sciences in Beijing. He obtained his PhD in Chinese history and language in 1998 from the Jawaharlal Nehru University in New Delhi, India, and studied for an MBA at the Lancaster University Management School in England from 2001 to 2002. He is currently a Professor of Chinese at the Center of Chinese and Southeast Asian Studies at Jawaharlal Nehru University. He is best known for his books on Sino-Indian relations and Chinese to English and Hindi translations. He was also the editor of a Chinese-Hindi dictionary. He has been a visiting fellow at the Chinese Academy of Social Sciences, visiting professor at Tianjin Foreign Studies University, China, Beijing Language University, China; Doon University, Dehradun India, and Teaching Fellow at the Scottish Centre of Chinese Studies in the University of Edinburgh, UK.

== Works ==
- 2001. India-China Relations in first half of the Twentieth Century. New Delhi: APH Publishers. ISBN 978-81-7648-245-5
- 2003. Chinese-Hindi Dictionary (汉印词典, Chini-Hindi Shavda kosh). New Delhi: Ministry of Human Resource and Development.
- 2005. India & China 1904-2004: A Century of Peace and Conflict. Manak Publications Pvt. Ltd. ISBN 978-81-7827-112-5
- 2010. Agriculture, Countryside and Peasants. Manak Publications Pvt. Ltd. ISBN 978-81-7831-205-7
- 2012. India-China Relations: Future Perspectives. Vij Books, New Delhi ISBN 978-93-8141-115-5
- 2012. India-China Relations: A Civilizational Perspective. Manak, New Delhi ISBN 978-93-7831-304-2
- 2015. India and China - Foreign Policy Approaches and Responses. Vij Books India Pvt Ltd, ISBN 9789385563294
- 2018. China's Global Rebalancing and the New Silk Road. Springer Singapore ISBN 978-981-10-5971-1
- 2020. India and China: Beyond the Binary of Friendship and Enmity. Springer Singapore ISBN 9789385563294
- 2021. India`s China Dilemma: The Lost Equilibrium and Widening Asymmetries. New Delhi: Pentagon Press. ISBN 9789390095452
- 2024. China in Xi Jinping`s New Era: Politics, Economy and Foreign Policy. ISBN 8197198640
- 2024. Rising India and China: Strategic Rivalries in the Himalayas and the Indo-Pacific Volume 1. Singapore: Palgrave Macmillan. ISBN 978-981-97-9189-7
- 2025. Rising India and China: Strategic Rivalries in the Himalayas and the Indo-Pacific Volume 2. Singapore: Palgrave Macmillan. ISBN 978-981-97-9225-2

== Translations ==
- 2006. My Life with [Dwarkanath] Kotnis. New Delhi: Manaak. ISBN 978-81-7827-152-1 Translation of Guo Qinglan's 《我与柯棣华》， 北京： 解放军文艺出版社 (2005).
- 2009. चीनी कविता: 11वीं शताब्दी ईसा पूर्व से 14वीं शताब्दी तक (Chinese Poetry: From 11th Century BCE to 14th Century). Prakashan Sansthan. ISBN 81-7714-399-9
- 2016. कन्फ़्यूशियस सूक्ति संग्रह. New Delhi: Prakashan Sansthan. ISBN 978-8177145366
- 2017. मेनशियस. New Delhi: Prakashan Sansthan. ISBN 9788177146127
- 2017. दिवार के उस पार: समय रेत पर हमारे पद चिन्ह . New Delhi: Prakashan Sansthan. ISBN 978-8177146189 Translation of My Tryst With China. China Translation Press 2017, Beijing
- 2018. चीनी सभ्यता के बुनियादी मूल्य . New Delhi: Prakashan Sansthan. ISBN 8177146564 Translation of Chen Lai's 《中华文明核心价值》，北京：生活·读书·新知三联书店 （2015）
- 2018. कन्फ़्यूशियसवाद के चार ग्रन्थ. New Delhi: National Book Trust of India. (Chinese to Hindi translation of the Chinese classic 《四书》Beijing: Zhonghua Book Company (2009)
- 2019. ची श्येनलिन : एक समालोचनात्मक जीवनी . New Delhi: Prakashan Sansthan. ISBN 9788177146639 Translation of Yu Longyu and Zhu Xuan's 《季羡林评传》，济南：山东教育出版社 （2016）
- 2021. चीन और भारत: सभ्यताओं का संवाद'. New Delhi: Prakashan Sansthan. ISBN 9789389127133 Translation of Yu Longyu and Liu Zhaohua's 《中外文学交流史：中印卷》，济南：山东教育出版社 （2015）
- 2021. पुराना जहाज़. New Delhi: Prakashan Sansthan. ISBN 9789392083099 Translation of Zhang Wei's 《古船》，济南：山东教育出版社 （2016）
- 2021. पश्चिमी उपवन . Beijing: China Translation Publishing Group. ISBN 7500166087 Translation of Wang Shifu’s 《西厢记》.
- 2022. Ji Xianlin: A Critical Biography . New Delhi: Pentagon Press. ISBN 9386618591 Translation of Yu Longyu and Zhu Xuan's 《季羡林评传》，济南：山东教育出版社 （2016）
- 2022. China and India: Dialogue of Civilisations. New Delhi: Pentagon Press. ISBN 978-9390095179
- 2022. कन्फ्यूशी विद्वान: एक गैर-आधिकारिक इतिहास (तीन खंडों में). Beijing: China Translation Publishing Group. ISBN 9787500167785 Translation of Wu Jingzi’s 《儒林外史》The Scholars.

== Awards ==
- 2011. Special Book Award of China For Translation of Chinese Classical Poetry into Hindi by the Government of China.
- 2006. Asia Fellow Award For conducting research on China's Agrarian Issues at the Rural Development Institute of the Chinese Academy of Social Sciences, China by Asia Scholarship Foundation, Bangkok, Thailand.
- 2003. Post Doctoral Fellowship By the University of Edinburgh, Scotland, UK.
- 1996. Nehru Fellow Award For doctoral studies at the Graduate Training College of the Chinese Academy of Social Sciences, China by the Nehru Memorial Museum and Library, New Delhi India.
- 1991. India-China Cultural Exchange Fellowship For advanced studies in Chinese History and Civilization at Peking University, China by the Government of India and China.
