= Jacques Giès =

French sinologist and art historian (1950–2021)

- Born: 10 January 1950; Paris, France
- Died: 11 April 2021 (aged 71); Rouen, France
- Occupations: Sinologist; Art Historian

Jacques Giès (10 January 1950 – 11 April 2021) was a French sinologist and art historian. He served as President of the Guimet Museum from 2008 to 2011.

== Biography ==
Giès studied design, painting, and engraving at the Académie de la Grande Chaumière starting at the age of 13. From 1972 to 1975, he studied at the Beaux Arts de Paris. He earned a doctoral degree in art history from Paris-Sorbonne University, concentrating on the Chinese language and civilization. He taught at Paris-Sorbonne University from 1974 to 1998 and subsequently at the École du Louvre from 1998 to 2008. In 1980, he became a conservator of Chinese and Central Asian art at the Guimet Museum.

From October 1995 to February 1996, Giès helped to organize an exhibition of Serindian art at the Grand Palais. He became President of the Guimet Museum in 2008. In 2009, he travelled to Hong Kong in search of contemporary Chinese artists to exhibit at the museum. He believed that Asian art did not change drastically from its ancient history to its contemporary styles, which preserved much of its beauty.

Jacques Giès died in Rouen on 11 April 2021 at the age of 71.

== Works ==
- Sérinde, terre de Bouddha : Dix siècles d'art sur la route de la soie, [exposition], Paris, Galeries nationales du Grand Palais, 24 octobre 1995-19 février 1996 (1995)
- Les Arts de l’Asie Centrale. La collection Pelliot au Musée Guimet (1996)
- Sérinde, Terre de Bouddha. Dix siècles d'art sur la Route de la Soie (1996)
- Trésors du Musée National du Palais, Taipei : Mémoire d’Empire (1998)
- La Sérinde, terre d'échanges (2000)
- With Reza, Laure Feugère and André Coutin, Le pinceau de Bouddha (2002)
  - Painted Buddhas of Xinjiang, translated by Ian West (2002)
- Montagnes Célestes (2004)
- La Voie du Tao : Un autre chemin de l’être (2010)
