= Ping Lu =

Chinese writer

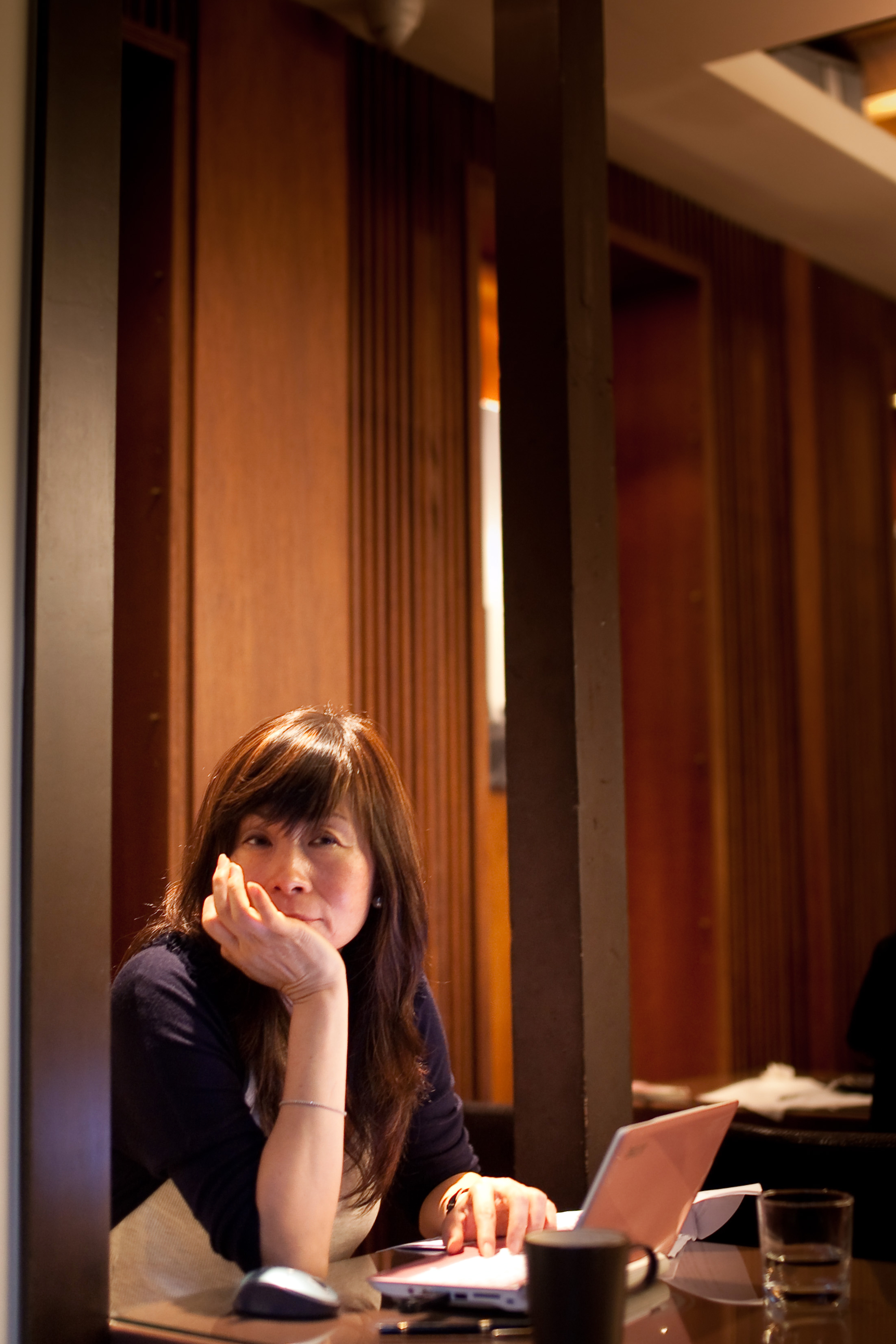
- Ambassador-at-large
- Born: Lu Ping; 1953 (age 72–73); Kaohsiung, Taiwan
- Occupation: Writer
- Known for: Social commentary

Lu Ping (Chinese: 路平; pinyin: Lù Píng; Pe̍h-ōe-jī: Lō͘ Pêng), born in Kaohsiung in 1953, is a Taiwanese writer who writes under the pen name Ping Lu. Her writing encompasses a broad range of genres, including novels, essays, poems, commentary, and theater plays. She is also known in the Chinese-language world for her critique of social phenomenon, ranging from cultural development to gender issues and human rights. Over the past two decades, Ms. Lu has successfully established herself as a prominent novelist, columnist, and commentator in Taiwan.

Ping Lu (平路), born Lu Ping (路平) in Kaohsiung, is the recipient of many major literary awards, including National Award for Arts 「國家文藝獎」, Taiwan Literature Award for Books 金典獎, and Golden Tripod Awards for Publications「金鼎獎」. Holding a B.A. in psychology from National Taiwan University and an M.A. in statistics from the University of Iowa, she has served as editor of China Times 「《中國時報》」 and part-time instructor of journalism at National Taiwan University. From 2003 to 2009 she was Taiwan's ambassador at large and Chairperson of the Kwang Hwa Information and Culture Center in Hong Kong. An accomplished writer, novelist, and columnist, she has authored many books since 1984, including short-story collections Death in a Cornfield《玉米田之死》and Monica's Diary《蒙妮卡日記》, novels Taiwan Trilogy—To the East of the East《東⽅之東》, ILHA Formosa《婆娑之島》, Passing《夢魂之地》, and, The River Darkens 《黑水》 and essay collections Heart Mandala《袒露的心》, The Gaps《間隙》, and travel-themed work, Antarctica: South of Myself 《南極·極南》.

== Background ==
Ms. Lu graduated from the Department of Psychology, National Taiwan University, and gained a master's degree from the University of Iowa. While working as a statistician in the United States, she won first prize with her short story "Death in a Cornfield" in the 1983 United Daily News fiction competition. Her other works also won her many prizes, including a prize in prose and a prize in dramatic composition. In 2002, she published a novel about the death of a famous Taiwanese singer Teresa Teng entitled When Will You Come Again? (Chinese title: 《何日君再來》).

== Literary Awards ==
Wu San-lien Literary Award「吳三連獎文學獎」, 2016

The Golden Tripod Awards for Publications 「金鼎獎」, 2018, for the book Heart Mandala《袒露的心》

The 22nd National Award for Arts 「國家文藝獎」, 2021

Taiwan Literature Award for Books 「金典獎」, 2021, for the book The Gaps《間隙》

== Literary works ==
Of her literary works, Love & Revolution (Chinese title: 行道天涯; The Chinese version first came out in 1995, while the English version was published by Columbia University Press in 2006)attracted the most attention. Ms. Lu re-imagines the lives of Sun Yat-sen and Soong Ching-ling, a legendary couple in modern China. She not only explores their marital relations, including their failings and desires, but also mentions Sun Yat-sen's political career and Soong Ching-ling's feelings of isolation and loneliness after her husband died. As Perry Link pointed out in his article entitled "Chinese Shadows" (published on November 16, 2006, by The New York Review), Ms. Lu also tries to find in Soong Ching-ling "the person buried under all the layers of image-making" and to "reconstruct a credible portrait" of the famous woman. He also said Ms. Lu "succeeds in showing the ordinary and sometimes repugnant details of Qingling's life," and that she "may or may not be accurate about Qingling's inner life, but she certainly writes with honesty and with penetration."

Her more recent works includes fiction The River Darkens (Chinese title: 黑水; published in 2015) and autobiographical essays collection Heart Mandala (Chinese title: 坦露的心; published in 2017; winner of the 2018 Golden Tripod Awards for Publications 金鼎獎). The River Darkens (黑水) has been published in a German-language edition with the German title Dunkle Gewässer, translated by Monika Li. The release received a major review in Frankfurter Allgemeine Zeitung.

In 2025, Ping Lu published her first travel-themed work, Antarctica: South of Myself 《南極·極南》. The book moves beyond the conventions of a travel guide or geographical account, presenting a reflective narrative that interweaves memory, time, aspiration, and loss. In the same year, Rye Field Publishing reissued her essay collections Heart Mandala 《袒露的心》 and The Gaps 《間隙》. Together with Antarctica: South of Myself, the three volumes were promoted as the "Ping Lu Trilogy of the Inner World."

In June 2025, Ping Lu participated in the Seoul International Book Fair, where Taiwan was featured as Guest of Honor for the first time. Alongside Wu Ming-yi and Tung Shu-ming, she represented Taiwanese literature through discussions addressing historical reflection, nature writing, and ethnic perspectives. As one of the featured Taiwanese authors, she also delivered a lecture in the "Taiwan Sensibility" series organized by the National Museum of Taiwan Literature, titled "The Novel: Mirrors within Mirrors and National History," examining the intersections of individual memory and national history.

In April 2026, Ping Lu was invited to Venice, Italy, to participate in the international literary festival Incroci di Civiltà.

The international translations of her novel *The River Darkens (Dunkle Gewässer in German)* (《黑水》) achieved significant recognition in 2026:

- In May 2026, the Czech edition of the novel, Temná řeka, was published by Mi:Lu Publishing.
- The German edition received critical acclaim, including a feature review in the *Frankfurter Allgemeine Zeitung* (FAZ), and was selected as No. 9 on the Deutschlandfunk "Best Crime Fiction List" (Krimibestenliste) for May 2026.

The novel To the East of the East (《東方之東》) was longlisted for the National Book Award for Translated Literature, announced in September 2026. In October 2026, it was also longlisted for the Chommanard International Women's Literary Award. The Spanish-language translation rights have been acquired.

== Critical studies ==
Scholarly attention has also been paid to Ping Lu's novel To the East of the East 《東方之東》, with academic analysis situating the work in discussions of gender, romance, and geopolitics in cross-strait literary relations. One study titled "Gendering Cross-Strait Relations: Romance and Geopolitics in Li Ang's Seven-Generation Predestined Relationship and Ping Lu's To the East of the East examines how the narrative form of romance is used to explore personal desire, Taiwanese history, and cross-strait socio-political interactions in Ping Lu's novel, arguing that such literary strategies offer nuanced insights into both gender and geopolitical themes in Taiwanese literature.

== Ambassador at Large ==
Prior to becoming the director of Kwang Hwa Information and Cultural Center in January 2003, Ms. Lu had worked as an editorial writer for The China Times, spent many years lecturing on such subjects as feminism, cultural criticism, and news commentary at National Taiwan University and Taipei National University of the Arts, and served as ambassador-at-large for Taiwan for a few years.

Ms. Lu left her post in Kwang Hwa Information and Cultural Center in December 2009, but is continuously promoting cultural and economical exchanges between Taiwan and Hong Kong.

She is currently the chairman of Radio Taiwan International.

== Novels ==
- Brother Chun《椿哥》(Chunke), Taipei: Linking Publishing 聯經出版社, 1986; New Taipei City: INK Publishing 印刻, 2002 new edition.
- Love & Revolution: a novel about Soong Qingling and Sun Yat-sen《行道天涯》(Xingdao tianya) (translated by Nancy Du) New York: Columbia University Press, 2006. ISBN 0-231-13852-0（聯合文學，1995）
- 《何日君再來》（印刻出版社，2002）
- To the East of the East《東方之東》(Dongfang zhi dong) (translated by Jeremy Tiang) New York: World Editions, 2026. ISBN 978-1-64286-167-9 (聯合文學, 2011)
- ILHA Formosa《婆娑之島》(Poso zhi dao), Taipei: Business Weekly Publishing 商周出版社, 2012; New Taipei City: ECUS Publishing 木馬文化, 2024 new edition.
- The River Darkens《黑水》(Hei shui), Paper, Taipei: Linking Publishing 聯經出版社 / E-book, Taipei: ohreading.com 群星文化, 2015.
- Taiwan Trilogy「平路台灣三部曲」—To the East of the East《東⽅之東》(Dongfang zhi dong), ILHA Formosa《婆娑之島》(Poso zhi dao), and Passing《夢魂之地》(Menghun zhi di), New Taipei City: ECUS Publishing 木馬文化, 2024.

== Collections of Short Stories ==
- Death in a Cornfield《玉米田之死》(Yumitian zhi si), Taipei: Linking Publishing 聯經出版社, 1985; New Taipei City: INK Publishing 印刻, 2003 new edition.
- The Fifth Seal《五印封緘》(Wuyin fengjian), Taipei: Linking Publishing 聯經出版社, 1988; New Taipei City: INK Publishing 印刻, 2004 new edition.
- Spy Catchers《捕諜人》(Bu die ren), Co-authored with Chang Hsi-kuo 張系國. Taipei: Hongfan Bookstore 洪範書店, 1992.
- Revelations of Banned Books《禁書啟示錄》(Jinshu chishilu). Taipei: Rye Field Publishing 麥田出版社, 1997.
- Letters of One Hundred Years《百齡箋》(Bailing jian). Taipei: UNITAS Publishing 聯合文學出版社, 1998; 2009 second edition.
- Five Paths Through A Dusty World《紅塵五注》(Hongchen wu zhu). Taipei: Crown Publishing 皇冠出版社, 1989; Taipei: UNITAS Publishing 聯合文學出版社, 1998 new edition.
- Ningzhi Hot Spring《凝脂溫泉》(Ningzhi wenchuan). Taipei: UNITAS Publishing 聯合文學出版社, 2000; 2009 second edition.
- Monica's Diary《蒙妮卡日記》(Monica riji). Taipei: UNITAS Publishing 聯合文學出版社, 2011; 2022 new edition.

== Collections of Essays ==
- 《巫婆之七味湯》（聯合文學出版社，1999）
- 《我凝視》（聯合文學出版社，2002）
- 《讀心之書》（聯合文學，2004）
- 《平路精選集》（九歌出版社，2005）
- 《浪漫不浪漫》（聯合文學，2007）
- 《香港已成往事》（牛津出版公司，2009）
- Heart Mandala《袒露的心》(Tanlude xin). Taipei: China Times Publishing 時報出版, 2017; 2021 audio edition.
- The Gaps《間隙：寫給受折磨的你》(Jianxi). Taipei: China Times Publishing 時報出版, 2020; 2021 audio edition.

== Collections of Critical Essays ==
- 《到底是誰聒噪》（當代出版社，1988）
- 《在世界裡遊戲》（圓神出版社，1989）
- 《非沙文主義》（唐山出版社，1991）
- 《女人權利》（聯合文學，1998）
- 《愛情女人》（聯合文學，1998）

== Travel writing ==
- Antarctica: South of Myself 《南極·極南》(Nanji jina). Taipei: China Times Publishing 時報出版社, 2025.

== Plays ==
- Who Killed XXX?《是誰殺了XXX》(Shishui shale XXX). Taipei: Eurasian Press 圓神出版社, 1990.

== Works Published in The Taipei Chinese PEN Quarterly ==
- "Chaos" 混沌, tr. Michelle Min-Chia WU 吳敏嘉, 209 (Summer 2024) 9-14.
- "Chronicles of Artificial Intelligence" 人工智慧紀事, tr. Sterling Swallow 師德霖, 208 (Spring 2024) 7–31.
- "Death In A Cornfield" 玉米田之死, tr. Chang Jun-Mei Chou 周張潤梅, 54 (Winter 1985) 1–30.
- "East of the East, Part I" 東方之东(一), tr. Adela Jeng 鄭秀瑕, 165 (Autumn 2013) 41.
- "East of the East, Part II" 東方之东(二), tr. Adela Jeng 鄭秀瑕, 166 (Winter 2013) 55–76.
- "Five Paths Through the Dusty World" 紅塵五注, tr. Daniel J. Bauer 鮑端磊, 84 (Summer 1993) 37–48.
- "Rainbow" 彩虹, tr. Michelle Min-Chia WU 吳敏嘉, 209 (Summer 2024) 15-20.
- "The Fifth Seal" 五印封緘, tr. Nancy Du 杜南馨, 88 (Summer 1994) 40–66.
- "The Legend of Master Hau" 郝大師傳奇, tr. Nancy Du 杜南馨, 92 (Summer 1995) 33–64.
- "Wedding Date" 婚期, tr. Sylvia Li-Chun Lin 林麗君, 135 (Spring 2006) 36–57.
