= Bronze and Sunflower =

Chinese novel

- Cover of English version by Meilo So
- Author: Cao Wenxuan
- Original title: 青铜葵花
- Translator: Helen Wang
- Language: Chinese
- Genre: Children's literature
- Publisher: Phoenix Juvenile and Children's Publishing (China), Walker Books (UK); Candlewick Press (USA)
- Publication date: 2005 (China)
- Publication place: China
- English publication date: 2015 (UK); 2016 (USA)
- OCLC: 974210264

Bronze and Sunflower
- Simplified Chinese: 青铜葵花
Transcriptions
Standard Mandarin
- Hanyu Pinyin: Qingtong Kuihua

Bronze and Sunflower (Chinese: 青铜葵花) is a Chinese children's novel written by Cao Wenxuan and was first published in 2005. The novel is set in the Cultural Revolution. It is a story of friendship between Bronze, a mute peasant boy, and Sunflower, the young daughter of an artist sent to a May Seventh Cadre School.

It has won numerous awards and commendations in China, and has been translated into several languages.

== Plot ==
Bronze is a young mute boy, the only son of the poorest family in the village. Sunflower is a young girl, taken in by Bronze's family when she is orphaned. The story follows their lives in the village of Damaidi, highlighting family values against the hardships of rural life. It is one of a series of books set in the same region at the same time.

=== Translations ===
Bronze and Sunflower has been translated into several languages since its publication in 2006. Following is a list containing information about the translated works. Bronze and Sunflower is Cao's first novel to be translated into English. The translation was conducted by the British translator Helen Wang, and was published in 2015 in the UK and 2016 in the US. An account of this book's publishing history was published in Publishing Perspectives in 2018.

Language	Title	Publisher	Publishing date	Translator	Reference
English (UK)	Bronze and Sunflower	Walker Books	2015	Helen Wang	
English (US)	Bronze and Sunflower	Candlewick Press	2017	Helen Wang	
French	Bronze et Tournesol	Éditions Philippe Picquier	2015	Brigitte Guilbaud	
German	Bronze und Sonnenblume	Esslingen Drachenhaus-Verl	2014	Nora Frisch	
Italian	Girasole	Giunti	2015	Paolo Magagnin	
Turkish	Tunç ve Ayçiçeği	FOM Kitap	2017	Nimet Melis Çağlar	
Polish	Brązowy i Słonko	Wydawnictwo Akademickie Dialog	2019	Katarzyna Sarek, Maria Jarosz, Andrzej Swoboda	

== Audiobooks ==
- Bronze and Sunflower, narrated by Ming-Zhu Hii
- Bronze and Sunflower (English), narrated by Emily Woo Zeller

== Reception ==
Bronze and Sunflower has received mainly positive reviews from critics.

- Kirkus Best Books of the 21st Century (So Far)
- Evanston Public Library: 101 Great Books for Kids list
- New York Times Book Review Notable Children's Books of the Year 2017
- Publishers Weekly Best Books of the Year
- YALSA Best Fiction for Young Adults (nominee)
- ALSC Notable Children's Books nominee
- Booklist Top 10 Historical Fiction for Youth
- 2017 Marsh Award for Children's Literature in Translation
- Junior Library Guild Selection Best Multicultural Books
- The Wall Street Journal's Best Children's Books of 2017
- Freeman Award - 2017 Winner – Young Adult/Middle School Literature

=== Reviews ===
The following are a selection of reviews:

- The Horn Book (04/06/2017): "The author does not shy away from heartbreaking events such as famine, storm devastation, and the loss of loved ones, resulting in a moving and at times shockingly honest account...Translator Wang manages successfully the difficult tasks of maintaining the stylistic integrity of the original text and achieving a high level of readability in her translation."
- School Library Journal (01/26/2017): "The landscape, captured in lyrical, evocative prose, takes the leading role in this episodic novel set during China’s Cultural Revolution...This beautifully written depiction of a time and place not often seen in children’s literature makes for a strong purchase."
- Buffalo News (04/06/2017): "Two lonely children, scarred by tragedy, form an inseparable bond in this lovely novel from a beloved Chinese author set in the Chinese countryside during the Cultural Revolution."
- Publishers Weekly (starred review) (12/19/2016): "Hans Christian Andersen Award–winner Wenxuan’s moving story of a friendship between two lonely Chinese children, orphaned Sunflower and mute Bronze, bears all the elements of a classic: an inviting and solidly constructed setting, a close-knit family, and a kindhearted community (there’s even a pet buffalo)."
- Booklist (starred review) (01/05/2017): "Virtuous and kind, Bronze and Sunflower’s family reflects important cultural values including filial piety, respect for elders, the value of hard work and education, and the importance of saving face. This not-to-be-missed story reminds us to be thankful for family and love, no matter our station in life. Helpful back matter provides additional insight into this specific time in China's history."
- Bookpage (03/08/2017): "Told in spare yet glimmering prose, this story is a testament to all that love and loyalty are able to overcome... In a time when our divisions seem to be drawn more forcefully than ever, Bronze and Sunflower’s unlikely bond serves as a beacon of hope."
- Plain Dealer (04/12/2017): "The constant hardships of rural poverty are balanced by selflessness, love and the beauty of nature. The story's ending is both heartbreaking and transcendent, reminiscent of the best fairy tales."
- Kirkus Reviews (starred review): "In Wang's translation of his leisurely, languid prose, Hans Christian Andersen winner Cao captures both the infinite joys and harsh realities of rural farming life...While seemingly idealized, the story and its protagonists reflect the Confucian values of filial piety and society above self—the very foundation of Chinese culture. Readers of all ages should be prepared to laugh, cry, and sigh with satisfaction."
- The Wall Street Journal (03/15/2017): "Capturing a distinct time and place as well as moments of bittersweet universality, this vivid and accessible novel for 9- to 12-year-olds would make for a superb family read-aloud."
- The New York Times Book Review (05/17/2017): "To read [Bronze and Sunflower’s] adventures is to be embedded in the Chinese countryside — for good and bad. The daily circumstances of their lives may be different from those of American children, but the emotions and relationships are universal."
- Shelf Awareness Pro (03/09/2017): "The details about rural Chinese life are a revelation...Cao shows English-speaking readers a foreign world where time is measured in the seasonal comings and goings of the swallows, but also a familiar one where the fabric of family is woven from shared hopes and unexpected acts of kindness."
- A Fuse #8 Production (blog) (03/30/2017): "Ideal for bookclubs, this is one of the finest translations I’ve ever encountered and undeniably the best Chinese middle grade novel I’ve ever read."
- School Library Connection (01/11/2017): "These beautiful moments of love abounding in the midst of hardship and poverty are timeless and will appeal to all readers."
- The Washington Post (21/11/2019): The best children's books of 2019, selected by Erin Entrada Kelly: "The novel centers on two children - Bronze, a mute peasant boy, and Sunflower, the daughter of an artist - who are growing up in the wetlands of the northern Jiangsu province during China's Cultural Revolution. It's not enough to say this is a story of friendship and family, because it's much more than that. It's a story of loyalty, sacrifice and community, and what it means when you love the people in your life more than you love yourself."

== Awards ==
Year	Award
2018	Global Literature in Libraries Translated YA Book Prize, shortlisted
2017	Marsh Award for Children's Literature in Translation, awarded to Helen Wang for her English translation
2017	Chen Bochui Children's Literature Award, awarded to Helen Wang for translation and increasing visibility of Chinese children's literature
2017	Freeman Award (Young Adult/Middle School Literature Award)
2005	One of China Newspaper's Top Ten Books of 2005 (《中国报纸》2005年十大好书奖)
2005	"Good Books for All to Read" prize for novels (“好书大家读”年度长篇小说类创作最佳奖)
2005	Jiangsu Excellent Picture Books Award (江苏精品图书奖)
2005	National Five Unique Projects prize (全国“五个一工程”奖)
2005	1st World Publishing Government Prize (首届世界出版政府奖)
2005	China Writers Association 7th Excellent Children's Literature Award (中国作家协会第七届优秀儿童文学奖)
