= Ho Sok Fong =

Chinese Malaysian writer (born 1970)

- 贺淑芳 賀淑芳
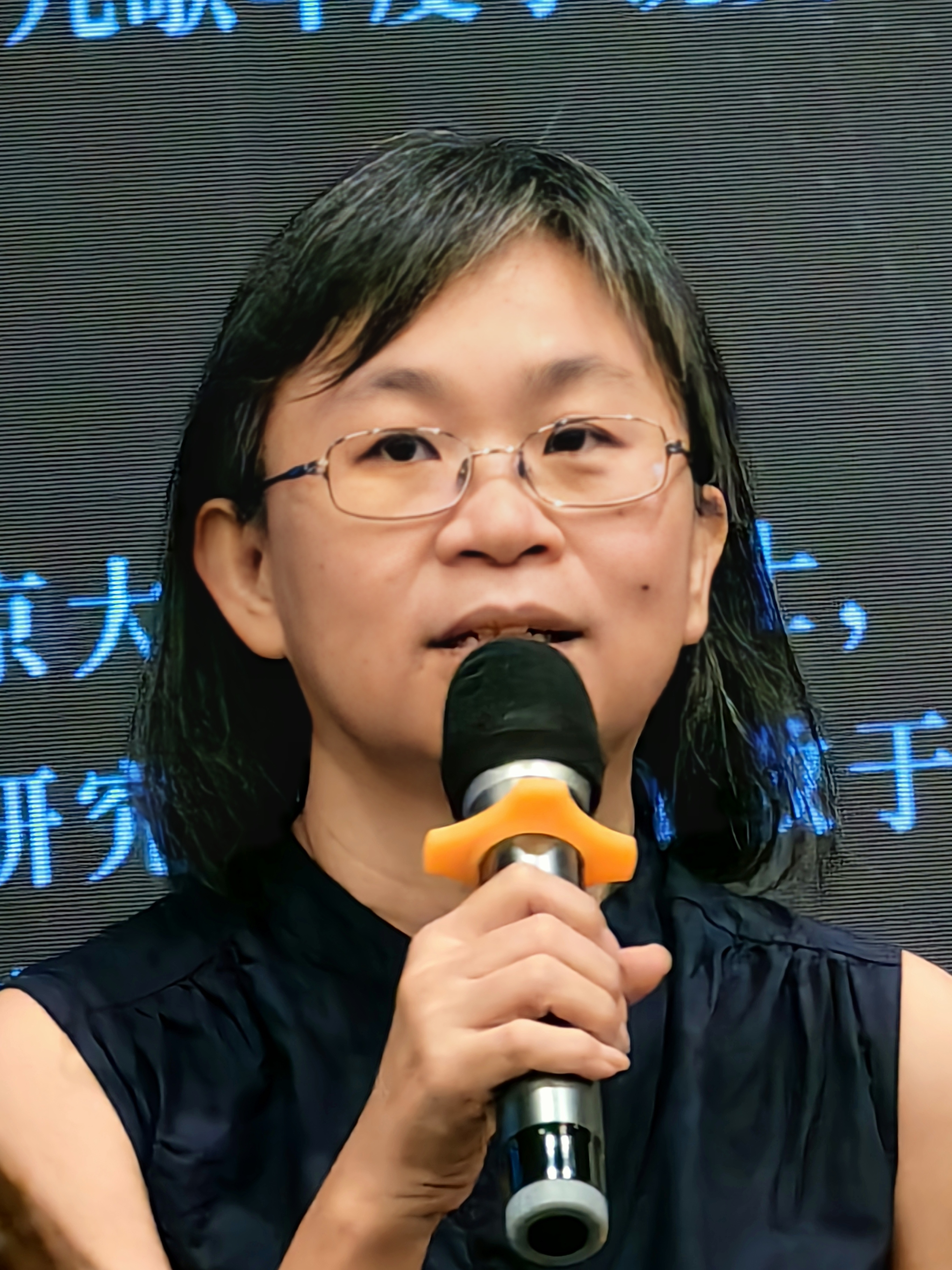
- Ho at 2024 Shanghai Book Fair
- Born: November 26, 1970 (age 55); Kedah, Malaysia
- Education: Universiti Sains Malaysia, Nanyang Technological University
- Occupation: Writer
- Writing career
- Genre: Fiction
- Notable work: Lake Like a Mirror (2014)

Ho Sok Fong (simplified Chinese: 贺淑芳; traditional Chinese: 賀淑芳; pinyin: Hè Shūfāng; Jyutping: Ho6 Suk6 Fong1; Pe̍h-ōe-jī: Hō Siok-hong, born November 26, 1970) is a Chinese Malaysian writer who teaches at Taipei National University of the Arts. Many of her short stories have focused on women in modern Malaysian society, Mahua (Chinese-Malaysian) literature and culture, and the importance of ethnicity and religion in Malaysia. She currently resides in Taipei.

== Biography ==
Born on November 26, 1970, in Kedah, Ho was trained as an engineer at the Universiti Sains Malaysia and received a PhD in Chinese language and literature at Nanyang Technological University in 2017. A short story from 2002, Bie zai tiqi (Never Mention It Again) was published in the anthology Huidao Malaiya. Huama xiaoshuo qishi nian (Return to Malaya: Stories by Chinese Malaysian Writers, 1937-2007). She has published two short story collections in Chinese, Maze Carpet and Lake Like a Mirror. Lake Like a Mirror, published in English by Granta in the UK and Two Lines Press in the US, was translated by Natascha Bruce. Among other accolades, Ho is the recipient of the 2015 Chiu Ko Fiction Prize, the 25th China Times Short Story Prize, the English PEN Award, and the United Press Short Story Prize. Lake Like a Mirror was also longlisted for the Warwick Prize for Women in Translation; Bruce was awarded a PEN Translates award for the translation.
