= Helen Wang =

English sinologist and translator

- Born: Helen Kay Below; 1965 (age 60–61)
- Spouse: Wang Tao
- Children: 2

Academic background
- Education: SOAS University of London; University College London
- Thesis: Money on the Silk Road: the evidence from Eastern Central Asia to c. AD 800 (2002)

Academic work
- Discipline: Sinology
- Sub-discipline: Coinage of Asia; Silk Road numismatics; Sir Aurel Stein
- Institutions: British Museum

Helen Kay Wang (née Below; simplified Chinese: 汪海岚; traditional Chinese: 汪海嵐; pinyin: Wāng Hǎilán; born 1965) is an English sinologist and translator. She works as curator of East Asian Money at the British Museum in London. She has also published a number of literary translations from Chinese, including an award-winning translation of a Chinese children's book.

== Biography ==
Wang has a BA in Chinese from SOAS University of London (1988, including a year at the Beijing Language Institute, 1984–1985). She has a PhD in archaeology from University College London, titled "Money on the Silk Road: the evidence from Eastern Central Asia to c. AD 800", 2002.

In 1991 Wang joined the British Museum staff as an assistant to Joe Cribb in the Asian section of the Department of Coins and Medals. She became Curator of East Asian Money in 1993. Her work mostly relates to the collections for which she is responsible, collection history and development of the field, in particular East Asian numismatics, Silk Road Numismatics, Sir Aurel Stein and his collections, and textiles as money. She was joint Honorary Secretary of the Royal Numismatic Society from 2011-2016, Hon. Vice President from 2018, and is an honorary member of the editorial board of Zhongguo Qianbi 《中国钱币》 (China Numismatics), the journal of the China Numismatic Society. She was elected as an individual member of the International Association for the Study of Silk Road Textiles (IASSRT) in 2016. In 2017, she started a web-resource Chinese Money Matters.

Wang was married to Chinese archaeologist Wang Tao, with whom she has two children.

== Literary translations ==
Wang's first published literary translations were in the early 1990s – short stories and essays by Yu Hua, Zhang Chengzhi, Ma Yuan, Du Ma and Zhang Langlang. After a long break, she returned to translation in the 2010s, translating more short stories, essays and children's books. She also works collaboratively with the China Fiction Book Club (with Nicky Harman), Paper Republic, Global Literature in Libraries. In 2016, she co-founded the group Chinese Books for Young Readers with Anna Gustafsson Chen and Minjie Chen. From 2012-2015 she was a Member of the Committee of the Translators Association. While on the committee, she independently started TranslatedWorld (a twitter handle) and initiated the #NameTheTranslator hashtag in December 2013. She has been on the judging panel of four of the Writing Chinese Project's Bai Meigui Chinese translation competitions.

== Awards and commendations ==
- 2025 - Kirkus Best Books of the 21st Century (So Far)
- 2024 Awarded the Medal of the Royal Numismatic Society
- 2024 Awarded the Lhotka Prize for Chinese Numismatics - the world of Chinese money (co-authored with François Thierry (numismatist) and Lyce Jankowski
- 2023 Mildred L. Batchelder Award Honor Book - for her translation of Dragonfly Eyes by Cao Wenxuan
- 2023 ALSC Notable Children's Books - for Dragonfly Eyes [ALSC = Association for Library Service to Children]
- 2023 Dragonfly Eyes received a 2022 Freeman Young Adult/Middle School Literature "Of Note" Award
- 2023 Playing with Lanterns by Wang Yage, illus. Zhu Chengliang, tr. Helen Wang (Amazon Crossing 2022) selected for the 2023 Notable Social Studies Trade Books list, a joint project of the National Council for the Social Studies (NCSS) and the Children’s Book Council.
- 2023 Playing with Lanterns selected for the 2023 USBBY Outstanding International Books List
- 2019 Awarded the Jeton de Vermeil by the Société française de numismatique
- 2019 Shortlisted for the GLLI Translated YA Book Prize - for Bronze and Sunflower
- 2017 Marsh Christian Award for Children's Literature in Translation - for her translation of Bronze and Sunflower by Cao Wenxuan
- 2017 Chen Bochui International Children's Literature Award - for translation and increasing visibility of Chinese children's literature
- 2017 Finalist in the Kirkus Awards Young Readers category - for Bronze and Sunflower
- 2017 Nominated for a 2018 YALSA award Best Fiction for Young Adults - for Bronze and Sunflower
- 2017 New York Times Notable Children's Books of 2017 - for Bronze and Sunflower
- 2017 Center for the Study of Multicultural Children's Literature - Best Books of 2017 - for Bronze and Sunflower
- 2015 Awarded an English PEN Writers in Translation grant - for Bronze and Sunflower

== Selected publications (books, edited and co-edited volumes) ==
- 2023 Look at the Coins! Papers in Honour of Joe Cribb on his 75th Birthday (Oxford: Archaeopress, 2023) (co-ed. with Robert Bracey) - this includes Wang's own paper "The Canton Ransom – What Happened to the Six Million Dollars of Silver?"
- 2022 Chinese Numismatics. The World of Chinese Money (Spink, London) (with François Thierry, Lyce Jankowski and Joe Cribb)
- 2021 Asia Collections in Museums outside Asia: Questioning Artefacts, Cultures and Identities, Transcultural Perspectives 2020, issue 1, thematic issue in Kunsttexte. Humboldt University. Berlin. (online publication, open-access) (co-ed. with Iside Carbone)
- 2013 Textiles as Money on the Silk Road (co-ed. with Valerie Hansen, 2013)
- 2012 Sir Aurel Stein, Colleagues and Collections (ed., 2012)
- 2012 The Music of Ink (Saffron Books)
- 2010 A Catalogue of the Japanese Coin Collection (pre-Meiji) at the British Museum, with special reference to Kutsuki Masatsuna (co-ed. with Shin'ichi Sakuraki, Peter Kornicki, with Nobuhisa Furuta, Timon Screech and Joe Cribb, 2010)
- 2008 Chairman Mao Badges: Symbols and Slogans of the Cultural Revolution (2008)
- 2008 Handbook to the Collections of Sir Aurel Stein in the UK (co-ed. with John Perkins, 2008)
- 2007 Catalogue of the Collections of Sir Aurel Stein in the Library of the Hungarian Academy of Sciences (co-ed. with Eva Apor, 2007), and its Supplement (co-ed. with Eva Apor, 2009)
- 2007 Textiles from Dunhuang in UK Collections (co-ed. with Zhao Feng and others, 2007)
- 2004 Money on the Silk Road: The Evidence from Eastern Central Asia to c. AD 800, with a catalogue of the coins collected by Sir Aurel Stein (2004)
- 2004 Sir Aurel Stein in The Times (ed., 2004)

== Book-length translations (novels) ==
- 2025 Pacific Ocean, Atlantic Ocean, by Huang Beijia (Arctic Publishing, 2025) ISBN 978-1998576227—黄蓓佳：《太平洋，大西洋》
- 2024 The Grass House, by Cao Wenxuan (Balestier Press, 2024) ISBN 978-1-913891-47-3 -- 曹文轩：《草房子》
- 2023 Lessons in Happiness, by Qin Wenjun (Cedic International Inc, 2023) ISBN 978-8542406863—秦文君：《幸福課》
- 2022 Dinner for Six, by Lu Min, co-translated with Nicky Harman (Balestier Press, 2022) ISBN 978-1913891329—鲁敏：《六人晚餐》
- 2021 Dragonfly Eyes, by Cao Wenxuan (Walker Books, 2021) ISBN 978-1406378252—曹文轩：《蜻蜓眼》
- 2017 The Ventriloquist's Daughter, by Lin Man-Chiu (Balestier Press, 2017) ISBN 978-1911221050—林满秋：《腹语师的女儿》
- 2015 Bronze and Sunflower, by Cao Wenxuan (Walker Books, UK, 2015 ISBN 978-1536206371; Candlewick Press, USA, 2016) -- 曹文轩：《青铜葵花》
- 2012 Jackal and Wolf, by Shen Shixi (Egmont, UK, 2012) ISBN 978-1405264495—沈石溪：《红豺》
