= Natascha Bruce =

British translator

- Education: University of Cambridge
- Occupation: Translator
- Writing career
- Period: 2011 -
- Genre: Fiction
- Notable works: Lake Like a Mirror (2019); Owlish (2023)

Natascha Bruce is a British writer and translator of Chinese fiction and nonfiction. She currently resides in Amsterdam.

== Biography ==
Bruce graduated from the University of Cambridge in 2010 with a Bachelor's degree in Chinese, focusing on contemporary Chinese literature. She began working as a translator in Taiwan, translating subtitles and screenplays into English. In 2015, she was a joint winner with Michael Day of the inaugural Bai Meigui Translation Prize for her translation of Dorothy Tse's short story Chicken (鸡). In 2016 she was a recipient of the American Literary Translators Association's Emerging Translator Mentorship for a Singaporean language. Since then, she has translated a number of works by writers including Xu Xiaobin, Ho Sok Fong, Can Xue, Patigül, Xie Ding, and Yeng Pway Ngon. Her translation of Ho's short story collection Lake Like a Mirror was shortlisted for the Warwick Prize for Women in Translation in 2020.

Bruce's other translations of Tse's work have been published in numerous journals; in 2019 they were awarded the 2019 Academy of American Poets Poems in Translation Prize for Cloth Birds, an author and translator residency at the Leeds Centre for Chinese Writing in 2020. Her translation of Can Xue's novella, Mystery Train, was published by Sublunary Editions in 2022. That same year, Bruce was awarded a PEN/Heim Translation Fund Grant for the publication of Tse's first novel, Owlish, which was published by Fitzcarraldo Editions in 2023.

== Selected bibliography ==
- Yeng, Pway Ngon (2019), Lonely Face : a novel, London: Balestier Press, ISBN 9781911221180
- Patigül (2019), Bloodline, Beijing: China Translation & Publishing House, ISBN 9787500159650
- That We May Live : speculative Chinese fiction, San Francisco, CA: Two Lines Press, 2020, ISBN 9781949641004
- Ho, Sok Fong (2020), Lake Like a Mirror, San Francisco, CA: Two Line Press, ISBN 9781931883986
- Xu, Xiaobin (2021), A Classic Tragedy: Short Stories, London: Balestier Press, ISBN 9781911221289
- Can, Xue (2022), Mystery Train, Seattle, WA: Sublunary Editions, IBSN 9781955190404
- Dorothy Tse (2023), Owlish, Fitzcarraldo Editions/Graywolf Press, ISBN 9781804270349/ISBN 9781644452356
- Dorothy Tse (2026), City Like Water, Fitzcarraldo Editions/Graywolf Press, ISBN 9781804272282/ISBN 978-1-64445-375-9
