= Su Weizhen =

Taiwanese writer, educator and editor

Su Weizhen (Chinese: 蘇偉貞; Wade–Giles: Su Wei-chen; 16 July 1954) is a Taiwanese writer, educator and editor.

== Biography ==
She was born in Yongkang Township, Taiwan and studied at the Political Staff College in Taiwan and the Chinese University of Hong Kong. Su served in the army and afterwards worked at a radio station. Later, she taught literature at the Chinese Culture University and was editor for the literary supplement of the United Daily News.

In 2011, she participated in the International Writing Program Fall Residency at the University of Iowa in Iowa City, IA.

She married Zhang Demo, who has since died.

== Awards ==
- 1980 Daily News short story award
- 1981 Daily News novelette award
- 1994 China Times novel award

== Selected works ==
Sources:

- Hongyan yi lao (The beauty has aged), story (1980)
- Pei ta yiduan (Keep him company for a while), story (1983)
- Sui yue di sheng yin (The sound of time) (1984)
- Chenmo zhi dao (Island of Silence) (1994) (Translated to English by Tiang, Jeremy 2013.)
- Fengbi de daoyu (Island in isolation) (1996)
- Moshu shike (Magic moment) (2002)
