= Zhao Feng (art historian) =

Chinese textile specialist and art historian

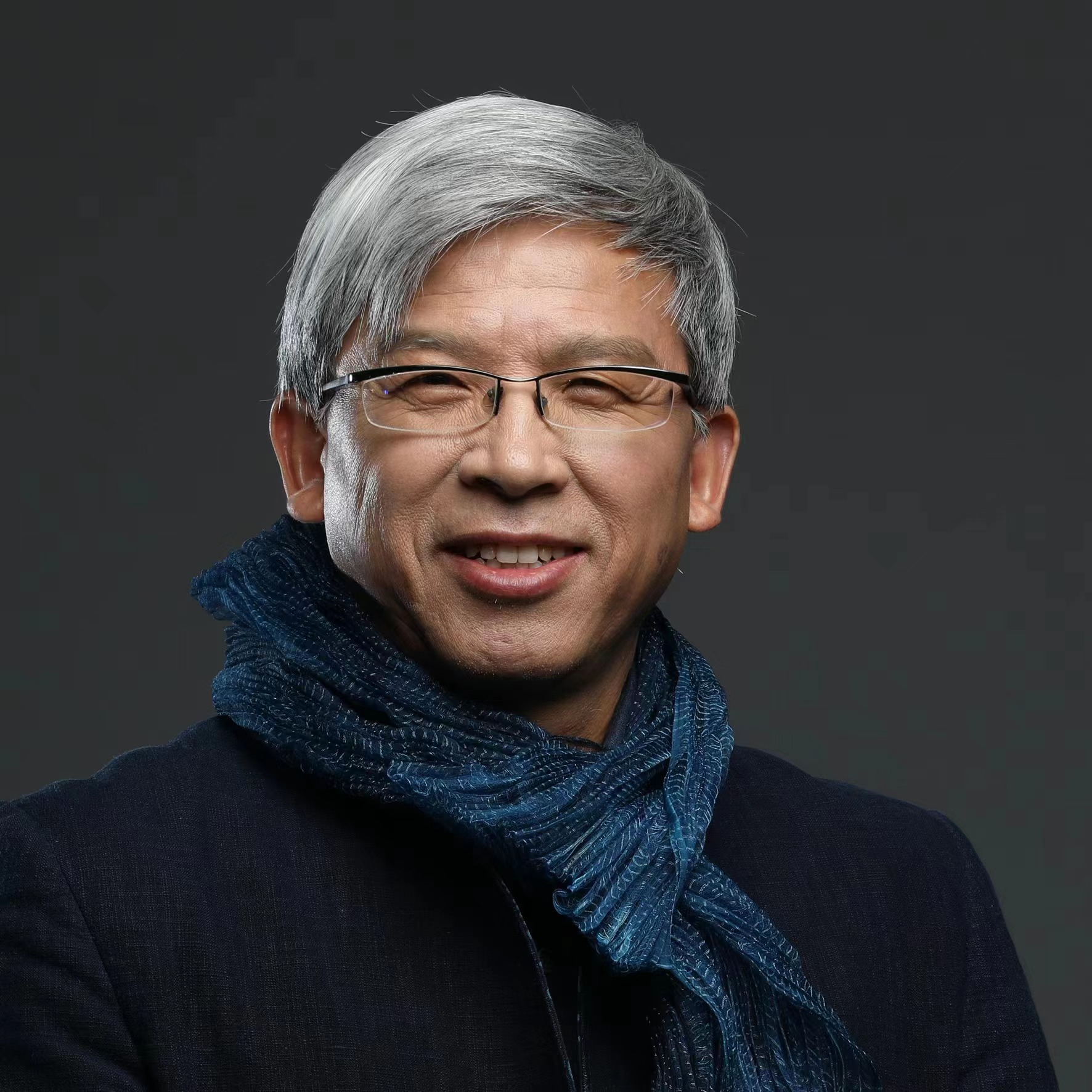
Zhao Feng

Dr. Zhao Feng (Chinese: 赵丰; born 1961) is a Chinese textile specialist with a special interest in Silk Road textiles. Dr. Zhao has been devoted to working in the China National Silk Museum for more than 30 years, and become the Director of the China National Silk Museum (NSM) since 2009. His research interests mainly focus on interdisciplinary research on textiles and cultural exchange along the Silk Road. In his tenure, he has transformed the NSM into a leading center for the preservation, study, and appreciation of silk as a significant art medium, and has developed the museum as a “research-oriented, conservation-cycled, international-targeted and fashion-conscious (Chinese: 研究型，全链条，国际化，时尚范)” institution.

== Education ==
Born in 1961, Zhao studied at the Zhejiang Institute of Silk Textile (now Zhejiang Sci-Tech University), earning a BA in Dyeing and Finishing (1978–82) and MA in Chinese Silk History (1982–84). He did his PhD in Textile History of China, at the China Textile University (now Donghua University) (1995–1997), a student of Zhu Xinyu 朱新予 and Jiang Youlong 蒋猷龙.

== Career ==
Zhao remained at the Zhejiang Institute of Silk Textile as an assistant researcher. In 1991, he became curator and researcher at the China National Silk Museum, and has remained with this museum since. He has served as an overseas visiting researcher, studying Chinese textiles in museums around the world: at the Metropolitan Museum of Art (1997–98), Royal Ontario Museum (1999), and British Museum (2006). He also holds the following positions in Chinese and international organisations: Director of Chinese Textiles Identification Protection Center; professor and PhD supervisor of Donghua University; member of the National Committee of Cultural Relics; council member of Centre International d'Etude des Textiles Anciens (CIETA); director of Dunhuang Studies of Zhejiang Province; representative of the 11th National People's Congress; one of Zhejiang Provincial “Super Experts”; director of Key Scientific Research Base of Textile Conservation, SACH. In 2015 he proposed the founding of the International Association for the Study of Silk Road Textiles, and became its first President.

In 2023, he became the Dean of the School of Art and Archaeology at Zhejiang University.

== Selected academic appointments ==
- Dean, School of Art and Archaeology, Zhejiang University, Hangzhou (2023.08–2025.06)
- Director, China National Silk Museum, Hangzhou (2011.02–2022.06)
- Member, Executive Board of the International Council of Museums (ICOM) (2022–Present)
- President, Costume and Design Museum Committee, Chinese Museums *Association/ICOM-China (2022–Present)
- Professor, Silk Engineering, Zhejiang University of Science and Technology, Hangzhou (2019–Present)
- Vice President, International Alliance of Museums of the Silk Road (IAMS) (2017–Present)
- Guest Researcher, W. F. Albright Institute of Archaeological Research, Jerusalem, Israel, January 2017
- Catalog Writer, China: Dawn of a Golden Age (200-750 AD), Metropolitan Museum of Art, New York, 2014
- Guest Lecturer, City University of Hong Kong, Hong Kong, January 2008 and 2009
- Guest Researcher with the grant from the British Academy, worked on the textiles in Aurel Stein's collection, British Museum, London, 2006
- The Veronika Gervers Memorial Fellowship, Royal Ontario Museum, Toronto, February 1999
- The Sylvan and Pamela Coleman Fellowship, Metropolitan Museum of Art, New York, 1997–1998
- Catalog Writer, China: 5,000 Years, Guggenheim Museum of Art, New York, 1997

== Other current positions ==
- President of Costume and Design Museum Committee in Chinese Museums Association/ ICOM-China, since 2021
- Guest Researcher of ICOM International Museums Research and Exchange Center (ICOM-IMREC), since 2021
- Member of Ethics Committee of International Council of Museums (ETHCOM), since 2020
- Professor and Doctoral Supervisor of Textile Conservation in Zhejiang Sci-Tech University, since 2019
- Vice President of International Alliance of Museums of the Silk Road Board (IAMS), since 2017
- Vice Chairman of International Silk Union Board (ISU), since 2016
- President of International Association for the Study of Silk Road Textiles (IASSRT), since 2016
- Board Member of ICOM-China, since 2014
- Editorial Board Member of Textile History, London, since ca. 2010
- Member of National Committee for Cultural Relics Authentication and Preservation in China, since 2005
- Professor and Doctoral Supervisor of Textiles and Costume History in Donghua University, Shanghai, since 2000
- Directing Council Member, Centre International d’Etude des Textiles Anciens (CIETA), since 1998

== Research ==
Zhao's research is in the history of Chinese silk; identification and conservation of textile relics; cultural communication between China and the world along the Silk Road. He has published extensively in both Chinese and English. Zhao contributed to the conceptualization and supervision of a 2025 study using scientific analysis to reconstruct archaeological textiles from Dunhuang.

== Selected publications ==
- 2025 Research on Textiles from Dunhuang: Research (Shanghai: Donghua University Press).《敦煌丝绸艺术全集：研究卷》ISBN 978-7-5669-2508-4
- 2025 (with LI Jinfang), Illustrations of Sericulture and Weaving – Chinese illustrated books on silk production, weaving and use in French collections (Hangzhou: Zhejiang guji chubanshe) 赵丰、李晋芳《法藏蚕织图册：生产、织造和使用》（浙江古籍出版社出版） ISBN 978-7-5540-3388-3
- 2025 (with Long Bo) Han Loom, Han Brocade. Research on the loom found at Laoguanshan and reconstruction of the five-star brocade found at Niya (Shanghai Science and Technology Publishing House) [Han jizhi Han jin. Laoguanshan tihuaji ji Niya wuxng jin de fuyuan yanjiu. 赵丰，龙博：《汉机织汉锦。老官山提花机及尼雅五星锦的复原研究》
- 2023 Looking for Liao Ling: Bai Juyi's "Liao Ling" Poetry and Tang Dynasty Silk, Zhejiang Ancient Books Press, Hangzhou.《寻找缭绫：白居易〈缭绫〉诗与唐代丝绸》
- 2022 Research Museum: Development Path of China National Silk Museum, Zhejiang University Press, Zhejiang, China.
- 2020 Chinese Silk on Russian Military Flags in Swedish Collection, Zhejiang University Press, Zhejiang, China.
- 2019 A World of Looms: Weaving Technology and Textile Arts, Zhejiang University Press, Zhejiang, China.
- 2018 Chinese Silks and Silk Road, Royal Collins Publisher, Quebec, Canada.
- 2015-2016 Silks from the Silk Road: Origin, Transmission and Exchange (chief ed. English and Chinese), Zhejiang University Press, Zhejiang, China. Won the 2015 National Distinguished Cultural And Museological Book Award.
- 2015 Early Chinese Textiles from the Lloyd Cotsen Collection, Cotsen Occasional Press, Los Angeles, USA.
- 2014 Global Textile Encounters (ed. with Marie-Louise Nosch and Lotika Varadarajan)
- 2014 Textiles from Astana and Buzak : with a glossary based on the document from Dunhuang and Turfan (with Wang Le)
- 2013 Textiles as Money on the Silk Road (with Helen Wang, Valerie Hansen, Masaharu Arakawa, Rong Xinjiang, Angela Sheng, Eric Trombert, Wang Binghua, Wang Le, Xu Chang), special issue of the Journal of the Royal Asiatic Society
- 2012 Chinese Silks (with Wengying Li, Juanjuan Chen, James C.Y. Watt, Dieter Kuhn, Nengfu Huang, Hao Peng) (Yale University Press)
- 2007-ongoing—The Textiles from Dunhuang Project to research and publish all textiles from Dunhuang has resulted in three publications so far, of which Zhao is the editor-in-chief: Textiles from Dunhuang in UK Collections,Textiles from Dunhuang in French Collections and Textiles from Dunhuang in Russian Collections.
- 2004 Style from the steppes : silk costumes and textiles from the Liao and Yuan periods 10th to 13th century (with Anne E Wardwell; Mark Holborn; Donald Dinwiddie; Barbara Mathes Gallery)
- 2001 Wang Xu and textile archaeology in China : in memory of Wang Xu on the third anniversary of his death / Wang Xu yu fang zhi kao gu : ji nian Wang Xu xian sheng shi shi san zhou nian (ISAT/Costume, Hong Kong). ISBN 9789628569137
