= Eric Abrahamsen =

American literary translator (born 1978)

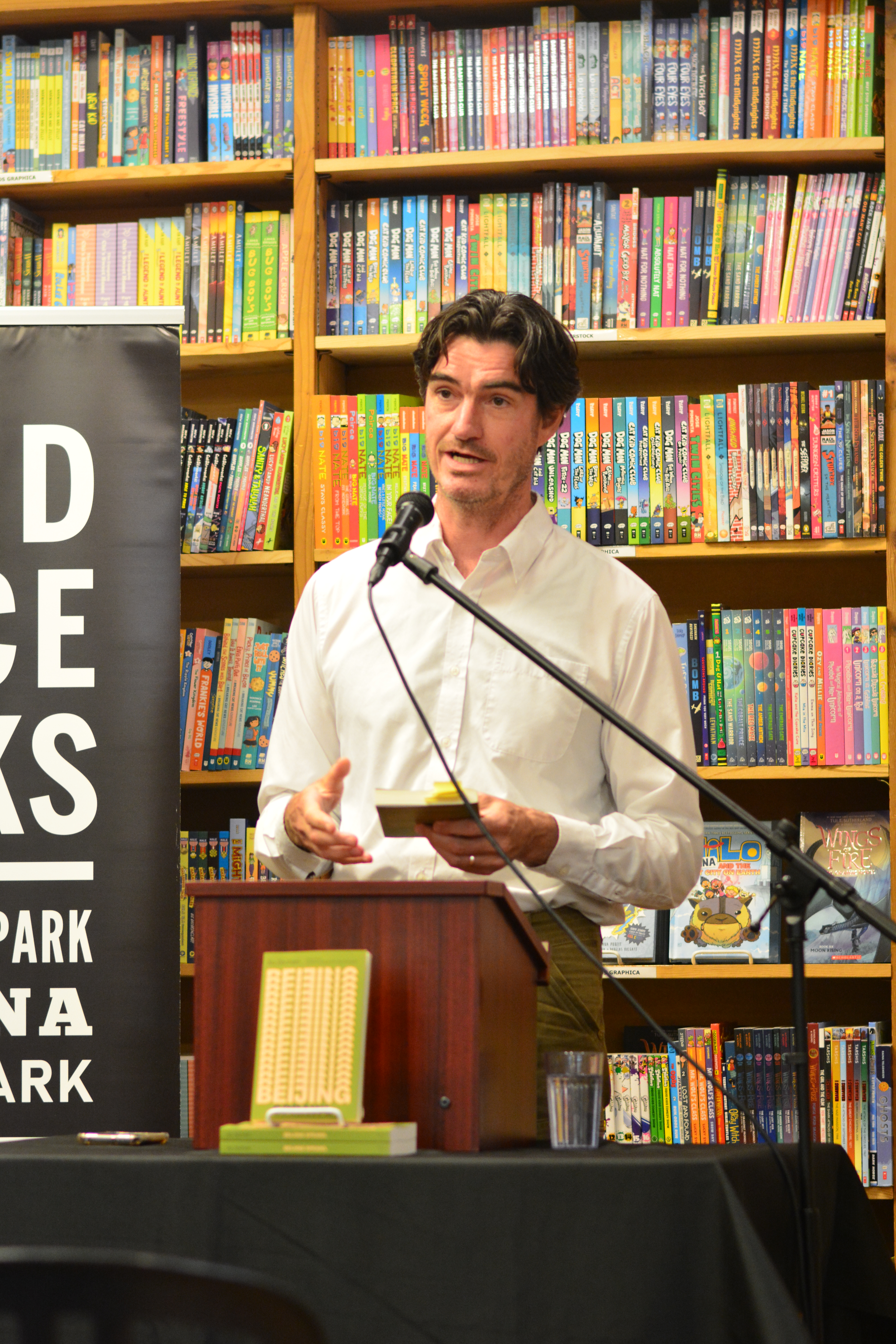

Eric Abrahamsen (born 1978) is an American award-winning literary translator from Chinese to English.

== Biography ==
Abrahamsen studied Chinese at the Central University for Nationalities in Beijing from 2001, and remained in China until 2016, translating and promoting Chinese literature. He hosts the website Paper Republic.

== Awards ==
- Awarded a PEN Translation Grant for his translation of Wang Xiaobo's My Spiritual Homeland.
- Awarded a NEA grant for his translation of Xu Zechen's Running Through Beijing.
- Shortlisted for the National Translation Award for his translation of Xu Zechen's Running Through Beijing.
- 2015 - Awarded Special Book Award of China

== Publications ==
Abrahamsen has translated numerous works of varying lengths, which have been published in The New Yorker, Granta, n+1, and Paper Republic. He also writes about contemporary Chinese literature.

=== Translations of Novels ===
- Wang Xiaofang: The Civil Servant's Notebook (2011) 公务员笔记
- Xu Zechen: Running Through Beijing (2013) 跑步穿过中关村

=== Translations of Short Stories ===
- A Yi: Barren Land 贫瘠之地
- A Yi: In the Penal Colony 在流放地
- Bi Feiyu: The Deluge 大雨如注
- Bi Feiyu: Wang Village and the World 地球上的王家庄
- Jiang Yitan: China Story 中国故事
- Lu Yang: Silver Tiger 银色老虎
- Lu Yang: Running Around Beijing 在北京奔跑
- Sheng Keyi: An Inexperienced World 缺乏经验的世界
- Su Tong: Watermelon Boats 西瓜船
- Wang Xiaobo: Mister Lover 舅舅情人
- Xu Zechen: A Brief History of Time 时间简史
- Xu Zechen: Outdoor Film 露天电影
- Xu Zechen: Wheels Are Round 轮子是圆的
- Xu Zechen: Visiting Dai on a Snowy Evening 雪夜访戴
- Xu Zechen: The Dog's Been Barking All Day, July, 2017 狗叫了一天
- Zhang Wei: King's Blood 王血
- Zhang Wei: Rain and Snow 下雨下雪

== GNU Emacs ==
In his spare time, Abrahamsen is also a programmer active in Emacs community. He is the author of Org-Translate, an Org-based translation environment.
