= Yeng Pway Ngon =

Singaporean writer (1947–2021)

- Born: 26 January 1947 Bugis, Singapore
- Died: 10 January 2021 (aged 73) Singapore
- Notable awards: Singapore Literature Prize (2004, 2008, 2012); Cultural Medallion for Literature (2003); S.E.A. Write Award (2013)
- Spouse: Goh Beng Choo
- Children: Ying Ke Wei

Yeng Pway Ngon
- Chinese: 英培安
Transcriptions
Standard Mandarin
- Hanyu Pinyin: Yīng Péi'ān
- Wade–Giles: Yeng Pway Ngon
Yue: Cantonese
- Jyutping: Jing1 Pui4 On1
Southern Min
- Hokkien POJ: Eng Pôe-an
- Tâi-lô: Ing Puê-an

Yeng Pway Ngon (Chinese: 英培安; pinyin: Yīng Péi'ān; Jyutping: Jing1 Pui4 On1; Pe̍h-ōe-jī: Eng Pôe-an; 26 January 1947 – 10 January 2021) was a Singaporean poet, novelist and critic in the Chinese literary scene in Singapore, Malaysia, Hong Kong and Taiwan.

A prolific writer, Yeng's works have been translated into English, Malay, Dutch and Italian. Yeng has been a recipient of the Singapore Book Award, the Singapore Literature Prize (four times), and the Southeast Asian Writers Award (also known as the S.E.A. Write Award). For his contributions to the literary scene, Yeng was awarded the Cultural Medallion for Literature in 2003.

== Early life ==
Yeng was born in the Bugis area of Singapore in 1947. His father was a Chinese physician who came from China and his mother worked in a coffee shop in the area. Yeng's parents married during the Japanese Occupation (1942–1945).

Yeng graduated from Ngee Ann College with a Bachelor of Arts in Chinese Literature in 1969. As a student, Yeng excelled in Chinese and art classes at Catholic High School, Singapore, but scraped through or failed everything else. He decided to embark on writing after submitting a sonnet in lieu of an essay on any subject in Chinese class. His teacher gave him a good grade, and the poem was published in a newspaper.

== Career ==
From 1978 to 1983, Yeng worked as a newspaper columnist for Nanyang Siang Pau writing for the column "Chang Hua Duan Shuo". In 1983, Nanyang Siang Pau merged with Sin Chew Jit Poh to become Lianhe Zaobao. Yeng continued contributing as a columnist for the newspaper's "Ren Zai Jiang Hu" column.

Yeng became a full-time writer in the 1980s. He also wrote radio plays for Rediffusion and published many of his works. In 1987, he published a novel, Yi Ge Xiang Wo Zhe Yang De Nan Ren (A Man Like Me), which won the National Book Development Council of Singapore Book Award the following year.

In 1994, Yeng spent a year in Hong Kong as a freelance columnist for United Daily News, Ming Pao, Sing Tao Daily and Sing Tao Evening News. He returned to Singapore later that year and reopened Grassroots Book Room until 2014.

In 1995, he set up one of Singapore's most prominent Chinese bookstores, the Grassroots Bookroom, at Textile Centre. This was his second bookstore, after Vanguard Bookshop at Golden Mile Tower. In July 2014, Yeng sold Grassroots to his former customers—former Lianhe Zaobao journalist and dramatist Lim Jen Erh, Lim Yeong Shin and medical doctor Lim Wooi Tee—who reopened the bookstore at Bukit Pasoh Road in January 2015.

In 2013, Yeng was the first writer-in-residence of the Nanyang Technological University Chinese department. He taught classes on Chinese literature and novel-writing and also started to devote more time to a novel about the lives of Cantonese opera actors.

In 2014, two English translations of his novels were published in Singapore. Math Paper Press brought out Art Studio, translated by Goh Beng Choo and Loh Guan Liang, while Epigram Books released Trivialities About Me and Myself, translated by Howard Goldblatt.

In 2015, The Straits Times' Akshita Nanda selected Art Studio as one of 10 classic Singapore novels. Reading it in its English translation, she called it "beautifully broad-minded in its attitude towards women's rights and inter- racial relations, nicely detailing some characters' slow awakening to the lessons one can learn in art and life outside a narrow circle."

== Controversy ==
In 1977, one of Yeng's friends falsely implicated him as being a communist. Yeng was detained under the Internal Security Act for alleged leftist sympathies. He spent most of those four months alone in prison, with his wife visiting him when she could.

In 2012, Yeng was ordered to pay $10,000 in damages and $20,000 in costs to artist Tan Swie Hian. Tan had accused Yeng of libelling him in a 2005 letter which the latter had sent to The Straits Times and the National Arts Council.

== Personal life ==
Yeng was married to Goh Beng Choo, a translator and former journalist. They met in a bookstore, when Madam Goh was just a 16-year-old secondary school student and Yeng a poet and writer at Ngee Ann College (now Ngee Ann Polytechnic). The couple have one daughter, who is a freelance piano teacher.

Yeng was diagnosed with prostate cancer in 2007, which later spread to his colon and pancreas. He died on 10 January 2021.

== Works ==
Novels

- 《一個像我這樣的男人》 (A Man Like Me, 1987)
- 《孤寂的脸》 (Lonely Face, 1989)
- 《騷動》 (Unrest, 2002)
- 《我與我自己的二三事》 (Trivialities About Me and Myself, 2006)
- 《画室》 (Art Studio, 2011)
- 《戲服》 (Costume, 2015)
- 《黄昏的颜色》 (The Colour of Twilight, 2019)

Novels in translation

- A Man Like Me, translated into English by Goh Beng Choo (1993, Grassroots Book Room) ISBN 981-00-4854-8
- Unrest, translated into English by Jeremy Tiang (2012, Math Paper Press; 2018, Balestier Press) ISBN 9789810738020, 978-1-911221-06-7
- L'atelier, translated into Italian by Barbara Leonesi (2013, Metropoli d'Asia) ISBN 978-88-96317-396
- Art Studio, translated into English by Goh Beng Choo and Loh Guan Liang (2014, Math Paper Press) ISBN 9810797508
- Trivialities About Me and Myself, translated into English by Howard Goldblatt (2014, Epigram Books) ISBN 9789814615105
- Costume, translated into English by Jeremy Tiang (2019, Balestier Press) ISBN 978-1-911221-08-1
- Lonely Face, translated into English by Natascha Bruce (2019, Balestier Press) ISBN 978-1-911221-18-0
- The Colour of Twilight, translated into English by Jeremy Tiang (2026, City Book Room) ISBN 9789811779268

Poetry

- Poems 1, Rebellion (2010, The Literary Centre) ISBN 9789810860226
- Poems 2, Personal Notes (2012, The Literary Centre) ISBN 9789810729844
- Poems 3, Self Exile (2012, The Literary Centre) ISBN 9789810734626
- Poems 4, Resurgence (2012, The Literary Centre) ISBN 9789810734633
- Poems 5, Other Thoughts (2012, The Literary Centre) ISBN 9789810734640
