= Shuang Xuetao =

Chinese novelist

- Born: September 8, 1983 (age 43); Shenyang, Liaoning, China
- Education: Jilin University (LLB); Renmin University (MA)
- Occupation: novelist
- Writing career
- Notable works: Gargoyle, A Writer's Odyssey

Shuang Xuetao (Chinese: 双雪涛; born September 8, 1983, in Shenyang) is a contemporary Chinese novelist. He graduated from the Jilin University School of Law.

In 2010, Shuang happened to see that the newly established China Times International Chinese-language Film and Fiction Award was seeking submissions. An employee of the Liaoning branch of the China Development Bank at the time, he wrote his first novel, Gargoyle in just 20 days, winning the award. In 2012, Shuang was shortlisted for the 14th Taipei Literature Awards, winning a cash-prize of 200,000 NTD, becoming the first mainland Chinese author to win the prize. That same year, Shuang quit his job to devote himself to writing full-time. In 2015, he left Shenyang to attend further studies in creative writing at Renmin University in Beijing.

Since 2016, Shuang has published the novels Tianwu's Account, Era of the Deaf and Dumb and the short story collections The Aviator, The Hunter, among other works. The short story "Assassinate the Novelist", included in the collection The Aviator, has been adapted into a film of the same name, directed by Lu Yang.

His short story collection Moses on the Plain was translated into English as Rouge Street: Three Novellas by Jeremy Tiang, and published by the Metropolitan Books imprint of Henry Holt and Company in April 2022. The book is credited with initiating the Dongbei renaissance in Chinese literature.

== Major works ==
=== Novellas ===
- Gargoyle (Chinese: 翅鬼; pinyin: Chìguǐ)
- Era of the Deaf and Dumb (simplified Chinese: 聋哑时代; traditional Chinese: 聾啞時代; pinyin: Lóng yǎ shídài)
- Tianwu's Account (simplified Chinese: 天吾手记; traditional Chinese: 天吾手記; pinyin: Tiānwú shǒujì)

=== Short story collections ===
- Moses on the Plain (Chinese: 平原上的摩西; pinyin: Píngyuán shàng de Móxī)
- The Aviator (simplified Chinese: 飞行家; traditional Chinese: 飛行家; pinyin: Fēixíngjiā)
- The Hunter (simplified Chinese: 猎人; traditional Chinese: 獵人; pinyin: Lièrén)

=== Works in translation ===
- The Master (simplified Chinese: 大师; traditional Chinese: 大師; pinyin: Dàshī), translated by Michael Day. In Pathways, Winter 2015.
- Rouge Street: three novellas, translated by Jeremy Tiang. Metropolitan Books/Henry Holt and Company, 2022. ISBN 9781250835871. Contains 3 novellas:
  - The Aeronaut (simplified Chinese: 飞行家; traditional Chinese: 飛行家; pinyin: Fēixíngjiā)
  - Bright Hall (Chinese: 光明堂; pinyin: Guāngmíng táng)
  - Moses on the Plain (Chinese: 平原上的摩西; pinyin: Píngyuán shàng de Móxī)
- Hunter (simplified Chinese: 猎人; traditional Chinese: 獵人; pinyin: Lièrén), translated by Jeremy Tiang. Granta Magazine Editions, 2025. ISBN 9781738536245.

== Awards ==
- 2010 China Times International Chinese-language Film and Fiction Award, First Place
- 2012 14th Taipei Literature Awards, Annuity
- 2016 Chinese-language Literature Media, Award Most Promising Newcomer of the Year
- 2017 Wang Zengqi Chinese-language Fiction Award, Best Short Story
