= Claudio Zanier =

Italian historian

Claudio Zanier (born 1942) is an Italian historian specialising in the history of East Asia and South East Asia, and in the history of silk, in particular.

== Career ==
Zanier is a historian specialising in the history of East and South East Asia. He has held academic positions in Italy, and has been a visiting research at many institutions. \

He was Assistant Professor in Political Economy, at Rome University, 1968-1974; Associate Professor (Tenured), History of East and South East Asia, Dept. of Modern and Contemporary History, University of Pisa, 1975-2012, Associate Professor (Temporary), Industrial Archeology, Corso diLaurea in Conservazione dei BeniCulturali, Università di Pisa, 1994-1998. He had held several research fellowships: at the Gokhale Institute of Politics and Economics, Pune (India), 1967-1968; the India Office Library and Records, London, 1979-1980; and School of Oriental and African Studies, London, 1983-1984; Scientific Coordinator for Italy, Silk Cultural Itineraries, Council of Europe, Strasbourg, 1991-2000; Visiting Professor, Institute for Economic Research, Hitotsubashi University, Tokyo, 1999-2000; Chercheur Associé, Ecole des Hautes Etudes en Sciences Sociales, Centre de Recherches Historiques, Paris, 2003-2006; Founding Member: AIPAI - Associazione Italiana per l'Archeologia Industriale (Italian Association for Industrial Archaeology) 2004. Now retired from the University of Pisa, he is a visiting scholar at the China National Silk Museum, focusing on the history of silk.

== Selected publications ==
- 1975 Accumulazione esviluppo economico in Giappone - dalla fine del XVI alla fine del secolo [Japanese Economic Development, 16th to 19th Century], Einaudi, Torino 1975."
- 1980 "Japanese periodicals in Italian public libraries - a preliminary note", Bulletin of the European Association for Japanese Studies, n. 15, December 1980.
- 1984 "Silk Culture in Western India: the "Mutti Experiment" (1830-1847)", Indian Economic and Social History Review, 21, 4, 1984.
- 1986 "Japan and the 'Pebrine' crisis of European sericulture during the 1860s", Bonner Zeitschrift für Japanologie, 8, 1986.
- 1989 "Japan as a newcomer in the world silk market: the European assessment (1848-1898)", Rivista internazionale di scienze economiche e commerciali, XXXVI, n. 1, 1989.
- 1990 "Rerouting the Silk Road via San Francisco. Italian Entrepreneurs and the Silk Crisis of the 1850s", in Storia Nordamericana, 7 (1990), I, pp. 105–116.
- 1993 Alla ricerca del seme perduto. Sulla via della seta tra scienza e speculazione (1858-1862) [Italian silk traders in China and India, 1858-1862], Angeli, Milano 1993.
- 1994 Where the roads met. East and West in the Silk Production Processes (17th to 19th Centuries), Kyoto 1994.
- 1994 "Current historical research into the silk industry in Italy", in Textile History, 25 (1994), I, pp. 61–78.
- 1996 "Tradition and Change in the Early Marketing of Japanese Silkworm Eggs: The First large-scale Japanese Inroad into Western Markets (1863-1875)", in S. Metzger-Court, W. Pascha (eds), Japan's Socio-Economic Evolution. Continuity and Change, Japan Library (Curzon Press), Folkestone (U.K.), 1996, pp. 50–65.
- 1999 "The valorisation of silk heritage in Italy: building viable tourist itineraries around historical uniqueness", Actes du Colloque Patrimoine industriel etsociété locale: identités, valorisation, emploi, Le Creusot, 24 - 25 octobre 1996, Patrimoinede l’ industrie, 2, 1999, pp. 9–14.
- 1999 "L’art de la soie, Pour la Science" - N° Special / Fibres Textiles, 266, Déc. 1999, pp. 44–49.
- 2000 (with Molà, L., Mueller, R.C.), La seta in Italia dal Medioevo al Seicento - Dal baco al drappo, [Silk in Italy from Middle Ages to 17th Century] Fondazione Giorgio Cini. Marsilio. Venezia 2000. ISBN 88-317-7261-9
- 2000 "I cicli di produzione nellecarte da parati cinesi del Castello di Govone", in Il Castello di Govone - Gliappartamenti, [18th Century Chinese wall-papers with silk-cycle motives in a Piedmont, Italy, Castle] CELID, Torino 2000, pp. 60–75. ISBN 88-7661-400-1
- 2001 "Italian silk traders in Japan at the time of pebrine silkworm epidemics (1861-1880)" in Sericultural Exchange between Italy and Japan in the Middle of 19th Century - Mazzocchi, Shimamura and ItalianSilk Costumes, Nippon Silk Center, Gunma 2001, pp. 41–50.
- 2001 "Kinu bôeki to shoki no Nichi-I Kôryû, in Bakumatsu Ishin to Gaikô", Bakumatsu Ishin Ronshû 7, Yoshikawa Kôbunkan, Tokyô 2001, pp. 286–315. ISBN 4-642-03727-6.
- 2001 "Il tempo di Odorico e la Seta, in: La Cina e la Via della Seta nel viaggio di Odorico da Pordenone", [Silk in the Times of Odoric's travel to China], Comune di Pordenone, Pordenone 2001, pp. 62–88.
- 2002 "The Worldwide Web of Silk Production, 1300-2000", Paper presented to the XIIIth International Conference of Economic History, Buenos Ayres, July 2002.
- 2003 "Ėchanges, appropriation et diffusion detechnologies d’ origine étrangère au Japon: Le cas de la sériciculture et de l’ industrie de la soie (1860-1900)", Ebisu, Maison Franco-Japonaise, 31, Tokyo, December 2003, pp. 5-25. ISSN 1340-3656.
- 2005 "Pre-Modern European Silk Technology and East Asia: Who Imported What?" in Ma Debin (ed.), Textiles in the Pacific, 1500-1900, Ashgate Variorum, Aldershot (UK), 2005, pp. 105–189. ISBN 0-7546-4075-2
- 2006 "Semai. Setaioli italiani in Giappone (1861-1880), [Italian Silk Entrepreneurs in Japan, 1861-1880] CLEUP, Padova 2006.
- 2007 "La fabrication de la soie: un domaine réservé auxfemmes", Travail, genre et sociétés, 18, 2007, pp. 111–130.
- 2008 Setaioli italiani in Asia. Imprenditori della seta in Asia Centrale dal 1859 al 1871 [Italian Silk Entrepreneurs in Central Asia, 1859-1871], CLEUP, Padova, 2008.
- 2009 "Italian documents on Central Asia: The papers of Giulio Adamoli (1869-1870)", Eurasian Studies, VII/1-2, 2009 (2010), pp. 87–123.
- 2010 "Le donne e il ciclo della seta [Women and the silk production cycle], in Percorsi di lavoro e progetti di vita femminili (a cura di A. Martinelli e L. Savelli), Felici Editore, Pisa 2010, pp. 25-46.
- 2010 "The Migration of the Silk Cycle from China: a Comprehensive View", Paper presented to the International Meeting on Historical Systems of Innovation – The Culture of Silk in the Early Modern World (14th to 18th Century). Max-Planck-Institut fuer Wissenschaftgeschichte, Berlin, 17.12.2010
- 2012 “Senza la barriera delle Alpi. La seta e l’eredità intellettuale di Matthieu Bonafous Tra Lyon e Torino”. English Translation: “Overcoming the Barrier of the Alps. Silk and the Intellectual Legacy of Matthieu Bonafous between Lyons and Turin”, CROMOHS, Cyber Review of Modern Historiography, 17, 2012, Firenze University Press.
- 2013 "La Cina delle manifatture come modello esterno per le élite piemontesi del ‘700. Le carte da parati del castello di Govone", [Chinese Manufactures in Govone’s Castle Wallpapers. A model to 18th Century Piedmont Ruling Class], in Pazzagli, Rossano (acura di), Il mondo a metà. Studi storici sul territorio el’ambiente in onore di Giuliana Biagioli, ETS, Pisa 2013, pp. 329–336.
