= Nicky Harman =

UK-based literary translator

Nicky Harman is a UK-based literary translator, working from Chinese to English and focussing on contemporary fiction, literary non-fiction, and occasionally poetry, by a wide variety of authors. When not translating, she spends time promoting contemporary Chinese fiction to English-language readers. She volunteers for Paper Republic, a non-profit registered in the UK, where she is also a trustee. She writes blogs (for instance Asian Books Blog), give talks and lectures, and takes part in literary events and festivals, especially with the Leeds Centre for New Chinese Writing. She also mentors new translators, teaches summer schools (Norwich, London, Warwick and Bristol), and judges translation competitions. She tweets, with Helen Wang, as the China Fiction Bookclub @cfbcuk.

She taught on the MSc in Translation at Imperial College until 2011 and was co-chair of the Translators Association (Society of Authors) 2014–2017.

== Life and career ==
Harman studied Chinese at the University of Leeds, and first went to China in 1974.

== Awards and honors ==
- Winner of a Special Book Award of China in 2020
- Shortlisted for the 2021 Newman Prize for Chinese Literature, for her co-translation with Natascha Bruce of Xu Xiaobin's work.
- Longlisted for the FT/Oppenheimer Funds Emerging Voices Awards 2016, with Xu Xiaobin's Crystal Wedding.
- Winner of the Mao Tai Cup People's Literature Chinese-English translation prize 2015. Link here: [in Chinese]
- Longlisted for the 2015 Best Translated Book Award Fiction BTBA Longlist, with Dorothy Tse's Snow and Shadow.
- Winner of first prize in the 2013 China International Translation Contest, Chinese-to-English section, with Jia Pingwa's "Backflow River" (贾平凹: 《倒流河》)
- Won a PEN Translation Fund Award (2006) for her translation of Banished! by Han Dong, which was subsequently long-listed for the Man Asian Literary Prize 2008.

== Translations ==
A list of her published translations can be found on her Paper Republic homepage.
