= Warwick Prize for Women in Translation =

Award for literary translation

The Warwick Prize for Women in Translation
- Description: Annual award for the best book written by a woman, translated into English and published in the UK or Ireland
- Country: United Kingdom / Ireland
- Presented by: University of Warwick
- Rewards: £1,000 (shared equally between author and translator(s))
- Status: Active
- First award: 2017
- Final award: 2026
- Currently held by: Johanna Ekström and Sigrid Rausing – And the Walls Became the World All Around
- Website: warwick.ac.uk/fac/cross_fac/womenintranslation/

The Warwick Prize for Women in Translation is an annual award for work by a female author translated into English and published by a UK-based or Irish publisher during the previous calendar year. The prize was established in 2017 "to address the gender imbalance in translated literature and to increase the number of international women’s voices accessible by a British and Irish readership." The prize is open to works of fiction, poetry, literary non-fiction, and fiction for children or young adults. Only works written by a woman are eligible; the gender of the translator is immaterial. The £1,000 prize is divided evenly between the author and her translator(s), or goes entirely to the translator(s) in cases where the writer is no longer living. The prize is funded and administered by the University of Warwick.

The prize was established following research conducted by the University of Warwick which revealed a significant gender imbalance in translated literature published in the UK, where only about a third of translated works were written by women. The award was founded to specifically address and improve these statistics.

== Establishment and criteria ==
Founded by translation scholar Chantal Wright, the prize responded to data showing translated fiction accounted for only 3.5% of UK publications but 7% of sales — with women heavily underrepresented. Eligible works include fiction, poetry, literary non-fiction, and children’s/young adult literature written by a woman in any language, published in print by a UK or Irish publisher between 1 April and 31 March.

== Impact and reception ==
Submissions have grown from 58 entries in 2017 to 164 in 2026 across 37 languages. The Three Percent Translation Database records a rise from ~28% female-authored translations in 2015 to ~33% in 2025. Some critics argue single-gender prizes risk “ghettoising” women writers, despite increased visibility.

== Recipients ==
Year	Author	Translator(s)	Title	Original language	Publisher (UK/Ireland)	Result	Ref.
2017	Yoko Tawada	Susan Bernofsky	Memoirs of a Polar Bear 雪の練習生	Japanese (translated from German)	Portobello Books	Winner	
2018	Daša Drndić	Celia Hawkesworth	Belladonna	Croatian	Istros Books	Winner	
2019	Annie Ernaux	Alison L. Strayer	The Years; Les Années	French	Fitzcarraldo Editions	Winner	
2020	Nino Haratischwili	Charlotte Collins & Ruth Martin	The Eighth Life (For Brilka); Das achte Leben (Für Brilka)	German	Scribe UK	Winner	
2021	Judith Schalansky	Jackie Smith	An Inventory of Losses; Verzeichnis einiger Verluste	German	MacLehose Press	Winner	
2022	Marit Kapla	Peter Graves	Osebol	Swedish	Allen Lane	Joint winner	
2022	Geetanjali Shree	Daisy Rockwell	Tomb of Sand रेत समाधि	Hindi	Tilted Axis Press	Joint winner	
2023	Deena Mohamed	Deena Mohamed	Your Wish Is My Command شبيك لبيك	Arabic	Granta Books	Winner	
2024	Nelly Sachs	Andrew Shanks	Revelation Freshly Erupting	German	Carcanet Press	Winner	
2025	Johanna Ekström & Sigrid Rausing	Sigrid Rausing	And the Walls Became the World All Around; Och väggarna förvandlades till världen runtomkring	Swedish	Granta Books	Winner	
2026	Batool Abu Akleen	Batool Abu Akleen, Graham Liddell , Wiam El-Tamami , Cristina Viti and Yasmin Zaher	48kg.	Arabic	Tenement Press	Winner	

== Nominees by year ==
Award winners, shortlists, and longlists
Year	Author	Translator(s)	Title	Result	Ref.
2017	Yoko Tawada	Susan Bernofsky	Memoirs of a Polar Bear	Winner	
2017	Svetlana Alexievich	Bela Shayevich	Second-hand Time	Shortlist	
2017	Larissa Boehning	Lyn Marven	Swallow Summer	Shortlist	
2017	Krystyna Boglar	Antonia Lloyd-Jones and Zosia Krasodomska-Jones	Clementine Loves Red	Shortlist	
2017	Ailbhe Ní Ghearbhuigh	Michael Coady, Peter Fallon, Tom French, Alan Gillis, Vona Groarke, John McAuliffe, Medbh McGuckian, Paul Muldoon, Michelle O'Sullivan, Justin Quinn, Billy Ramsell, Peter Sirr and David Wheatley	The Coast Road	Shortlist	
2017	Wioletta Greg	Eliza Marciniak	Swallowing Mercury	Shortlist	
2017	Ana Luísa Amaral	Margaret Jull Costa	The Art of Being a Tiger	Longlist	
2017	Tonke Dragt	Laura Watkinson	The Song of Seven	Longlist	
2017	Ioana Pârvulescu	Alistair Ian Blyth	Life Begins on Friday	Longlist	
2017	Herta Müller	Philip Boehm	The Fox Was Ever the Hunter	Longlist	
2017	Francesca Melandri	Katherine Gregor	Eva Sleeps	Longlist	
2017	Dorthe Nors	Misha Hoekstra	Mirror, Shoulder, Signal	Longlist	
2017	Samanta Schweblin	Megan McDowell	Fever Dream	Longlist	
2017	Marente de Moor	David Doherty	The Dutch Maiden	Longlist	
2017	Hiromi Kawakami	Lucy North	Record of a Night Too Brief	Longlist	
2017	Selma Lagerlöf	Sarah Death	Mårbacka	Longlist	
2018	Daša Drndić	Celia Hawkesworth	Belladonna	Winner	
2018	Olga Tokarczuk	Jennifer Croft	Flights	Shortlist	
2018	Jenny Erpenbeck	Susan Bernofsky	Go, Went, Gone	Shortlist	
2018	Esther Kinsky	Iain Galbraith	River	Shortlist	
2018	Żanna Słoniowska	Antonia Lloyd-Jones	The House with the Stained-Glass Window	Shortlist	
2018	Han Kang	Deborah Smith	The White Book	Shortlist	
2018	Dorrit Willumsen	Marina Allemano	Bang	Longlist	
2018	Tea Tulić	Coral Petkovich	Hair Everywhere	Longlist	
2018	Sara Gallardo	Jessica Sequeira	Land of Smoke	Longlist	
2018	Judith Hermann	Margot Bettauer Dembo	Letti Park	Longlist	
2018	Katja Petrowskaja	Shelley Frisch	Maybe Esther	Longlist	
2018	Elisabeth Åsbrink	Fiona Graham	1947	Longlist	
2018	Yūko Tsushima	Geraldine Harcourt	Of Dogs and Walls	Longlist	
2018	Selma Lagerlöf	Peter Graves	The Emperor of Portugallia	Longlist	
2018	Virginie Despentes	Frank Wynne	Vernon Subutex One	Longlist	
2019	Annie Ernaux	Alison L. Strayer	The Years	Winner	
2019	Négar Djavadi	Tina Kover	Disoriental	Shortlist	
2019	Olga Tokarczuk	Antonia Lloyd-Jones	Drive Your Plow Over the Bones of the Dead	Shortlist	
2019	Magda Szabó	Len Rix	Katalin Street	Shortlist	
2019	Azita Ghahreman	Maura Dooley with Elhum Shakerifar	Negative of a Group Photograph	Shortlist	
2019	Norah Lange	Charlotte Whittle	People in the Room	Shortlist	
2019	Alicia Kopf	Mara Faye Lethem	Brother In Ice	Longlist	
2019	Sayaka Murata	Ginny Tapley Takemori	Convenience Store Woman	Longlist	
2019	Yukiko Motoya	Asa Yoneda	Picnic in the Storm	Longlist	
2019	Léonora Miano	Gila Walker	Season of the Shadow	Longlist	
2019	Dalia Grinkevičiūtė	Delija Valiukenas	Shadows on the Tundra	Longlist	
2019	Ulrike Almut Sandig	Karen Leeder	Thick of It	Longlist	
2019	Guzel Yakhina	Lisa C. Hayden	Zuleikha	Longlist	
2020	Nino Haratischwili	Charlotte Collins and Ruth Martin	The Eighth Life (for Brilka)	Winner	
2020	Tove Jansson, edited by Boel Westin and Helen Svensson	Sarah Death	Letters from Tove	Runner-up	
2020	Ho Sok Fong	Natascha Bruce	Lake Like a Mirror	Shortlist	
2020	Yan Ge	Nicky Harman	White Horse	Shortlist	
2020	Natalia Ginzburg	Minna Zalman Proctor	Happiness, As Such	Shortlist	
2020	Rania Mamoun	Elisabeth Jaquette	Thirteen Months of Sunrise	Shortlist	
2020	Magda Szabó	Len Rix	Abigail	Shortlist	
2020	Tove Ditlevsen	Michael Favala Goldman	Dependency	Longlist	
2020	Isabella Morra	Caroline Maldonado	Isabella	Longlist	
2020	Krisztina Tóth	Owen Good	Pixel	Longlist	
2020	Marion Brunet	Katherine Gregor	Summer of Reckoning	Longlist	
2020	Gabriela Cabezón Cámara	Iona Macintyre and Fiona Macintosh	The Adventures of China Iron	Longlist	
2020	Clarice Lispector	Benjamin Moser and Magdalena Edwards	The Chandelier	Longlist	
2020	Long Litt Woon	Barbara Haveland	The Way Through the Woods	Longlist	
2020	Selja Ahava	Emily Jeremiah and Fleur Jeremiah	Things that Fall from the Sky	Longlist	
2020	Christina Hesselholdt	Paul Russell Garrett	Vivian	Longlist	
2021	Judith Schalansky	Jackie Smith	An Inventory of Losses	Winner	
2021	Yan Ge	Jeremy Tiang	Strange Beasts of China	Runner-Up	
2021	Scholastique Mukasonga	Melanie Mauthner	Our Lady of the Nile	Shortlist	
2021	Mieko Kawakami	David Boyd and Sam Bett	Breasts and Eggs	Shortlist	
2021	Maria Stepanova	Sasha Dugdale	In Memory of Memory	Shortlist	
2021	Maria Stepanova	Sasha Dugdale	War of the Beasts and the Animals	Shortlist	
2021	Małgorzata Szejnert	Sean Gasper Bye	Ellis Island: A People's History	Shortlist	
2021	Alice Zeniter	Frank Wynne	The Art of Losing	Shortlist	
2021	Nana Ekvtimishvili	Elizabeth Heighway	The Pear Field	Longlist	
2021	Annie Ernaux	Alison L. Strayer	A Girl's Story	Longlist	
2021	Jenny Erpenbeck	Kurt Beals	Not a Novel	Longlist	
2021	Hiromi Kawakami	Ted Goossen	People From My Neighborhood	Longlist	
2021	Esther Kinsky	Caroline Schmidt	Grove	Longlist	
2021	Camille Laurens	Willard Wood	Little Dancer Aged Fourteen	Longlist	
2021	Duanwad Pimwana	Mui Poopoksakul	Arid Dreams	Longlist	
2021	Olga Ravn	Martin Aitken	The Employees	Longlist	
2021	Adania Shibli	Elisabeth Jaquette	Minor Detail	Longlist	
2022	Marit Kapla	Peter Graves	Osebol: Voices from a Swedish Village	Winner	
2022	Geetanjali Shree	Daisy Rockwell	Tomb of Sand	Winner	
2022	Selva Almada	Annie McDermott	Brickmakers	Shortlist	
2022	Katja Oskamp	Jo Heinrich	Marzahn, Mon Amour	Shortlist	
2022	Faïza Guène	Sarah Ardizzone	Men Don’t Cry	Shortlist	
2022	Margarita Liberaki	Karen Van Dyck	Three Summers	Shortlist	
2022	Irene Solà	Mara Faye Lethem	When I Sing, Mountains Dance	Shortlist	
2022	Violaine Huisman	Leslie Camhi	The Book of Mother	Longlist	
2022	Olga Tokarczuk	Jennifer Croft	The Books of Jacob	Longlist	
2022	Samar Yazbek	Leri Price	Planet of Clay	Longlist	
2022	Susanne Wedlich	Ayça Türkoğlu	Slime: A Natural History	Longlist	
2022	Kyoko Nakajima	Ginny Tapley Takemori and Ian McCullough MacDonald	Things Remembered and Things Forgotten	Longlist	
2022	Diana Bellessi	Leo Boix	To Love A Woman	Longlist	
2022	Diana Anphimiadi	Natalia Bukia-Peters and Jean Sprackland	Why I No Longer Write Poems	Longlist	
2023	Deena Mohamed	Deena Mohamed	Your Wish Is My Command	Winner	
2023	Dorthe Nors	Caroline Waight	A Line in the World	Highly commended	
2023	Lalla Romano	Brian Robert Moore	A Silence Shared	Shortlist	
2023	Amanda Svensson	Nichola Smalley	A System So Magnificent It Is Blinding	Shortlist	
2023	Krisztina Tóth	Peter Sherwood	Barcode	Shortlist	
2023	Zhang Yueran	Jeremy Tiang	Cocoon	Shortlist	
2023	Margo Glantz	Ellen Jones	The Remains	Shortlist	
2023	Bushra al-Maqtari	Sawad Hussain	What Have You Left Behind?	Shortlist	
2023	Thuận	Nguyễn An Lý	Chinatown	Longlist	
2023	Alba de Céspedes	Ann Goldstein	Forbidden Notebook	Longlist	
2023	Dorothy Tse	Natascha Bruce	Owlish	Longlist	
2023	Marguerite Duras	Olivia Baes and Emma Ramadan	The Easy Life	Longlist	
2023	Magda Szabó	Len Rix	The Fawn	Longlist	
2023	Bianca Bellová	Alex Zucker	The Lake	Longlist	
2023	Grazia Deledda	Graham Anderson	The Queen of Darkness	Longlist	
2023	Hanne Ørstavik	Martin Aitken	ti amo	Longlist	
2024	Nelly Sachs	Andrew Shanks	Revelation Freshly Erupting	Winner	
2024	Jenny Erpenbeck	Michael Hofmann	Kairos	Special mention	
2024	Han Kang	Deborah Smith and e. yaewon	Greek Lessons	Shortlist	
2024	Marie Darrieussecq	Penny Hueston	Sleepless	Shortlist	
2024	Clarice Lispector	Robin Patterson and Margaret Jull Costa	Too Much of Life: Complete Chronicles	Shortlist	
2024	Urszula Honek	Kate Webster	White Nights	Shortlist	
2024	Linnea Axelsson	Saskia Vogel	Ædnan: An Epic	Longlist	
2024	Yulia Yakovleva	Ruth Ahmedzai Kemp	Death of the Red Rider: A Leningrad Confidential	Longlist	
2024	Stella Gaitano	Sawad Hussain	Edo’s Souls	Longlist	
2024	Hiroko Oyamada	David Boyd	The Factory	Longlist	
2024	Maria Stepanova	Sasha Dugdale	Holy Winter 20/21	Longlist	
2024	Marosia Castaldi	Jamie Richards	The Hunger of Women	Longlist	
2024	Grazia Deledda	Graham Anderson	Marianna Sirca	Longlist	
2024	Mieko Kanai	Polly Barton	Mild Vertigo	Longlist	
2024	Lena Merhej	Nadiyah Abdullatif and Anam Zafar	Yoghurt and Jam (or How My Mother Became Lebanese)	Longlist	
2025	Johanna Ekström and Sigrid Rausing	Sigrid Rausing	And the Walls Became the World All Around	Winner	
2025	Evelyne Trouillot	M. A. Salvodon	Désirée Congo	Shortlist	
2025	Maylis Besserie	Clíona Ní Ríordáin	Francis Bacon’s Nanny	Shortlist	
2025	Krisztina Tóth	George Szirtes	My Secret Life	Shortlist	
2025	Liliana Corobca	Monica Cure	Too Great A Sky	Shortlist	
2025	Han Kang	e yaewon and Paige Aniyah Morris	We Do Not Part	Shortlist	
2025	Fatma Aydemir	Jon Cho-Polizzi	Djinns	Longlist	
2025	Olga Tokarczuk	Antonia Lloyd-Jones	The Empusium	Longlist	
2025	María Bastarós	Kevin Gerry Dunn	Hungry for What	Longlist	
2025	Elsa Morante	Jenny McPhee	Lies and Sorcery	Longlist	
2025	Kim Hyesoon	Don Mee Choi	Phantom Pain Wings	Longlist	
2025	Laura Wittner	Juana Adcock	Translation of the Route	Longlist	
2025	Sara Mesa	Katie Whittemore	Un Amor	Longlist	
2025	Lucija Stupica	Andrej Peric	Vanishing Points	Longlist	
2026	Batool Abu Akleen	Batool Abu Akleen, Graham Liddell, Wiam El-Tamami, Cristina Viti and Yasmin Zaher	48kg.	Winner	
2026	Krisztina Tóth	Ottilie Mulzet	Eye of the Monkey	Shortlist	
2026	Linn Ullmann	Martin Aitken	Girl, 1983	Shortlist	
2026	Hélène Bessette	Kate Briggs	Lili Is Crying	Shortlist	
2026	Ichiyo Higuchi	Bryan Karetnyk	Troubled Waters	Shortlist	
2026	Anna Nerkagi	Irina Sadovina	White Moss	Shortlist	
2026	Hanna Johansson	Kira Josefsson	Body Double	Longlist	
2026	Lalla Romano	Brian Robert Moore	In Farthest Seas	Longlist	
2026	Eva Luka	James Sutherland-Smith	The Minotaur’s Daughter: Selected Poems	Longlist	
2026	Geetanjali Shree	Daisy Rockwell	Our City That Year	Longlist	
2026	Anjet Daanje	David McKay	The Remembered Soldier	Longlist	
2026	Gabriela Cabezón Cámara	Robin Myers	We Are Green and Trembling	Longlist	
2026	Ingvild Rishøi	Diane Oatley	Winter Stories	Longlist	

== See also ==
- List of literary awards honoring women
