= Borås Tidnings debutantpris =

Swedish literary award

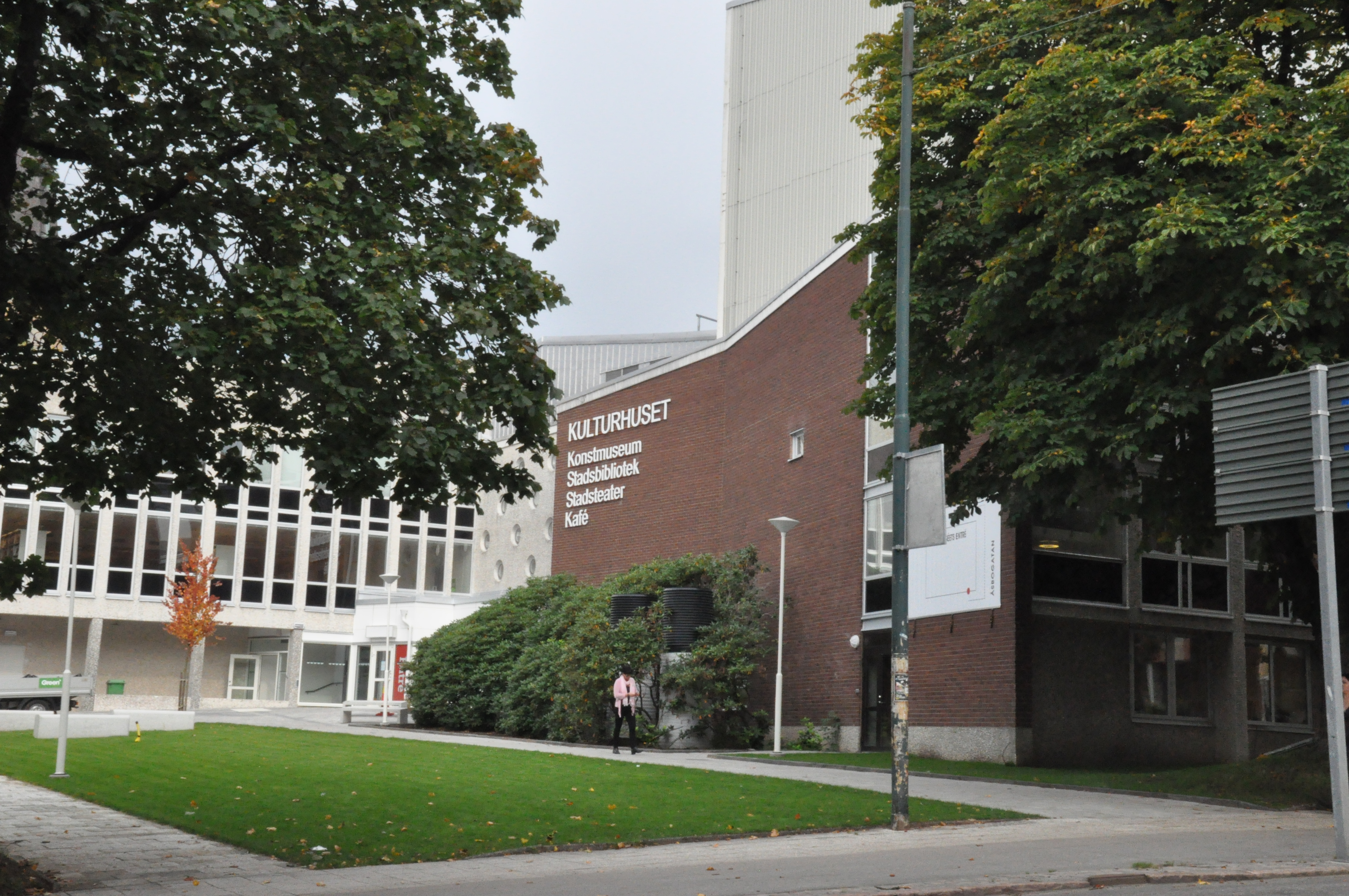
Borås City Theatre, venue of the Borås Tidnings debutantpris gala

Borås Tidnings debutantpris (Borås Tidning award for best literary debut) is an annual award to a Swedish debut literary work awarded by newspaper Borås Tidning and University of Borås. It was first awarded in 2001 to Lotta Lotass for Kallkällan, winning 100,000 SEK.

The award has become a prestigious prize in Swedish literature. In a 2010 study (Note: The Nobel Prize in Literature was excluded from the study.), Borås Tidnings debutantpris was the fourth most reported literary award in Sweden, after the August Prize, the Nordic Council Literature Prize, and Sveriges Radios romanpris, in one metric shared fourth with Piratenpriset. As of 2025, the award sum is 150,000 SEK, handed out at Borås City Theatre.

Korparna by Tomas Bannerhed was the first work to win both the August Prize and Borås Tidnings debutantpris in 2012. The 2020 winner Osebol by Marit Kapla has also won both awards.

The 2025 jury was author and literature critic Aase Berg, secondary-school teacher and critic Björn Kohlström, and University of Borås researcher Linnéa Lindsköld.

== Recipients ==
Year	Winner	Work	Shortlisted nominees	Ref.
2001	Lotta Lotass	Kallkällan	Cecilia Bornäs, Jag Jane; Mara Lee, Kom; Karl Johan Nilsson, Kvicksilver; Pia Paulina Nykänen, Herbarium	
2002	Maria Zennström	Katarinas sovjetiska upplevelser	Mats Kolmisoppi, Jag menar nu; Alejandro Leiva Wenger, Till vår ära; Caterina Pascual Söderbaum, Sonetten om andningen; Jerker Virdborg, Landhöjning två centimeter per natt	
2003	Daniel Sjölin	Oron bror	Johan Frisk, Första gången han hörde ljuden var en onsdag; Malte Persson, Livet på den här planeten; Ulrika Revenäs Strollo, Ristar in sina märken; David Vikgren, För en framtida antropologisk forskning	
2004	Jonas Hassen Khemiri	Ett öga rött	Johannes Anyuru, Det är bara gudarna som är nya; Annika Korpi, Hevonen Häst; Jesper Larsson, snö, tårar; Jenny Tunedal, Hejdade, hejdade sken	
2005	Ida Börjel	Sond	Sara Hallström, Vi måste ha protein; Gertrud Hellbrand, Vinthunden; Linda Örtenblad, Den anatomiska teatern; Sara Stridsberg, Happy Sally	
2006	Andrzej Tichý	Sex liter luft	Elise Ingvarsson, Beror skrymmande på; Mohamed Omar, Tregångare; Lina Sjöberg, Resa till Port Said; Sofia Stenström, Venus Vanish	
2007	Martina Lowden	Allt	Susanna Alakoski, Svinalängorna; Per Johansson, Göteborg i päls; Fabian Kastner, Oneirine; Anna Schulze, Brist	
2008	Viktor Johansson	Kapslar	Sam Ghazi, Sömn är tyngre än vatten; Elise Karlsson, Fly; Åsa Linderborg, Mig äger ingen; Sofia Rapp Johansson, Silverfisken	
2009	Sara Mannheimer	Reglerna	Elin Boardy, Allt som återstår; Amanda Hellberg, Styggelsen; Fausta Marianović, Sista kulan sparar jag åt grannen; Hassan Loo Sattarvandi, Still	
2010	Johan Kling	Människor helt utan betydelse	Susanne Axmacher, Näckrosbarnen; Viktoria Myrén, I en familj finns inga fiender; Henrik B. Nilsson, Den falske vännen; Caroline Ringskog Ferrada-Noli, Naturen	
2011	Helena Österlund	Ordet och färgerna	Eli Levén, Du är rötterna som sover vid mina fötter och håller jorden på plats; Stephan Mendel-Enk, Tre apor; Anna Ringberg, Boys; Elin Ruuth, Fara vill	
2012	Tomas Bannerhed	Korparna	Kristofer Ahlström, Bara någon att straffa; Naima Chahboun, Kunskapens arkeologi; Carolina Fredriksson, Flod; Andrés Stoopendaal, Maskerad	
2013	Susanna Lundin	Hindenburg	Elisabeth Berchtold, Marialucia; Lyra Ekström Lindbäck, Tillhör Lyra Ekström Lindbäck; Katarina Fägerskiöld, Åsen; Sami Said, Väldigt sällan fin	
2014	Anna Fock	Absolut noll	Pernilla Berglund, Tilltar; Pål Börjesson, Gallus; Athena Farrokhzad, Vitsvit; Lina Hagelbäck, Violencia	
2015	Maxim Grigoriev	Städer	Tove Folkesson, Kalmars jägarinnor; Åsa Foster, Man måste inte alltid tala om det; Agnes Gerner, Skall; Negar Naseh, Under all denna vinter	
2016	Stina Stoor	Bli som folk	Theodor Hildeman Togner, Ut; Gabriel Itkes-Sznap, Tolvfingertal; Linna Johansson, Lollo; Anna Westphalen, Perfekt packad skit	
2017	Thom Lundberg	För vad sorg och smärta	Marit Furn, Skuggan; Andreas Lundberg, Storm i den pelare som bär; Elis Burrau, Och vi fortsatte att göra något rörande; Tone Schunnesson, Tripprapporter	
2018	Agnes Lidbeck	Finna sig	Linus de Faire, Boken om Yousef; Viktoria Jäderling, Åh Lunargatan; Isabelle Ståhl, Just nu är jag här; David Väyrynen, Marken	
2019	Wera von Essen	En debutants dagbok	Emeli Bergman, Salt; Nino Mick, Tjugofemtusen kilometer nervtrådar; Hanna Rajs Lundström, Armarna; Elin Willows, Inlandet	
2020	Marit Kapla	Osebol	Bella Batistini, Mata duvorna; Kalle Hedström Gustafsson, Mormorordning, hägringsöar; Judith Kiros, O; Lina Rydén Reynols, Läs mina läppar	
2021	Erik Lindman Mata	Pur	Arazo Arif, mörkret inuti och frukten; Hanna Johansson, Antiken; Annika Norlin, Jag ser allt du gör; Donia Saleh, Ya Leia	
2022	Quynh Tran	Skugga och svalka	Sofia Dahlén, Patient; Ali Derwish, Saddam Husseins nya roman; Aya Kanbar, Hyperverklighet; Lisa Zetterdahl, Hästar	
2023	Mikael Yvesand	Häng city	Kristoffer Appelvik Lax, och vardagen då när vi stryker och kardar seriöst; Mimmi Jensen Gellerhed, Vaken; Sorin Masifi, Staten systrarna dikten; Linnéa Sjödin, Bortom Amerika	
2024	Sanna Samuelsson	Mjölkat	Emilia Aalto, När bror dör; Ylva Gripfelt, Det gudomliga tillståndet; Lida Starodubtseva, En oändligt lång vår; Frans Wachtmeister, Territoriella språk	
2025	Ali Alonzo	Jag tänker bli äcklig	Maria Bodin, Kristinafragment; Agri Ismaïl, Hyper; Johanna Larsson, Bokstavstro; Mattias Timander, Din vilja sitter i skogen	
