= Weasels in the Attic =

2022 novel by Hiroko Oyamada

- Author: Hiroko Oyamada
- Translator: David Boyd
- Genre: Literary fiction, psychological fiction, surrealist fiction
- Publisher: New Directions
- Publication date: October 4, 2022
- Pages: 96
- ISBN: 978-0811231183
- Preceded by: The Hole

Weasels in the Attic is a novel by Hiroko Oyamada originally published as three separate stories in Japan and subsequently translated into English by David Boyd. The English translation was published by New Directions in 2022.

== Synopsis ==
In three interlocking parts—"Death in the Family", "The Last of the Weasels", and "Yukiko", the novel follows a consistent cast of characters at different points in time, specifically concerning a couple who struggles to start a family while their friends are able to do so successfully.

== Critical reception ==
Publishers Weekly considered the novel "sharp and surreal" as well as "a unique and unsettling tale."

The New York Times called the novel "eerie, mesmeric". The New York Review of Books said that Oyamada's work, including Weasel in the Attic, "vibrate with such images, which seem to flicker between mirage and deadpan realism, and lurk in the imagination like a haunting." Ploughshares observed "the precariousness of parenthood and family" in Oyamada's writing. The Asian Review of Books called it "a fine, understated work of contemporary cultural commentary" and noted that it was much more approachable and accessible than her previously translated books, The Factory and The Hole.

Asymptote selected the novel for their November book club.
