= Sanna Samuelsson =

Swedish author and cultural journalist (born 1987)

- Born: 1987 (age 38–39); Skeda udde, Sweden

Sanna Samuelsson (born 1987) is a Swedish author and cultural journalist.

== Career ==
Samuelsson earned a master's degree in Literary Composition from the Academy of Art and Design at the University of Gothenburg.

Samuelsson has held several editorial position in Swedish media, including at Nöjesguiden and as head editor for Aplace Magazine. In 2016 she became head editor of the feminist culture magazine Bang. She was formerly the editor for ideas and critique at Göteborgs-Posten, originally as acting editor in September 2020, becoming the regular editor in February 2021.

Her first novel, Mjölkat, was published in the summer of 2023. The novel has received the debut award from Borås Tidning as well as the inaugural award of the Nordic queer literature award Prisma for Novel of the year.

== Personal life ==
Samuelsson was born in Skeda udde, where she also grew up. She is a lesbian, and is in a relationship with author Hanna Johansson.
