= Sami Said =

Sami Said may refer to:

- Sami D. Said, a U.S. Air Force lieutenant general
- Sami Said (writer), an Eritrean-born Swedish novelist
