= Ultraviolence =

Ultraviolence or Ultra-violence may refer to:

- A term used in the Anthony Burgess novel A Clockwork Orange and the Stanley Kubrick film of the same name

== Music ==
- Ultraviolence (band), a British industrial and techno band

=== Albums ===
- Ultraviolence (album), a 2014 album by Lana Del Rey
- The Ultra-Violence, the 1987 debut album by thrash metal band Death Angel

=== Songs ===
- "Ultraviolence" (song), a 2014 single by Lana Del Rey
- "Ultra-Violence", a song by Lower Class Brats from their 1998 album Rather Be Hated Than Ignored
- "Ultraviolence", a song by New Order from their 1983 album Power, Corruption & Lies
- "Ultraviolence/Screaming", a medley of songs by Scream from their 1983 album Still Screaming
- "Ultraviolence", a song by Heartsrevolution released in 2008
- "The Ultraviolence", a song by Joe Stump from his 1993 album Guitar Dominance!
- "Ultra-Violence", a song by Mickey Avalon from his 2020 album Speak of the Devil

== Entertainment ==
- Ultraviolence (film), a 2022 Colombian film directed by Marco Vélez Esquivia
- Ultraviolence, a hardcore wrestling style in Combat Zone Wrestling
- Ultra-violence, the second hardest difficulty mode in the 1993 video game Doom, and the third hardest difficulty mode in the 2016 video game Doom
- Ultravåld (Ultraviolence), a 2026 Swedish novel written by Tone Schunnesson
