= Robab Moheb =

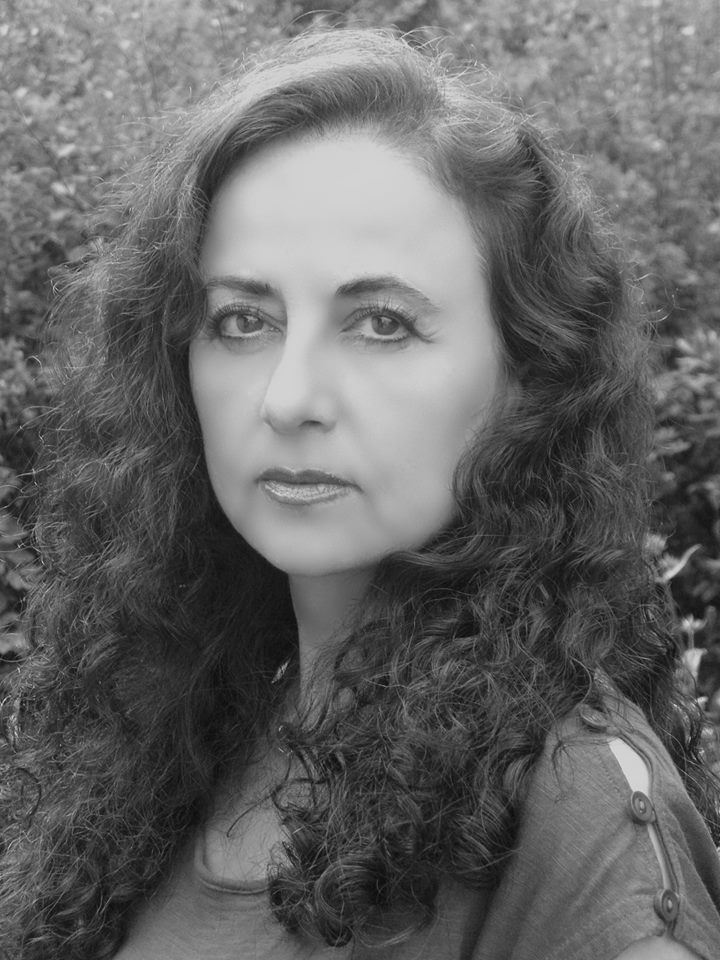
Robab Moheb

Robab Moheb, born 1953 in Iran, is a Swedish–Iranian poet, author and translator.

Moheb studied sociology in Iran and has received a master's degree in pedagogical sciences in Sweden, where she has lived since 1992. Her debut as an author came in 1979 with a collection of short stories. In 2008 she published her first translations of Swedish poetry into Persian in collaboration with Swedish poets Kristina Lugn, Ida Börjel and Katarina Grippenberg.

== Bibliography (selection) ==
- bâ dàsthâye por be xâne bâzmigàrdim, Negah Press, Iran, 1979.
- pàriye kuchake hâns, Lajvard Press, Iran, 2002.
- pàs àz in àgàr àz tàrs xâli bemânàm, Lajvard Press, Iran, 2005
- pâvàràghi, Baran Press, Stockholm, Sweden, 2008.
