= Karen Van Dyck =

American classicist (born 1961)

- Born: January 25, 1961 (age 65); New York City, U.S.
- Occupations: Literary critic and translator

Academic background
- Education: Wesleyan University

Academic work
- Discipline: Translation studies, gender studies, Greek diaspora studies
- Institutions: Wesleyan University, Aristotle University of Thessaloniki, University of Oxford, Columbia University, University of Michigan, Bogazici University, University of Athens
- Notable works: Austerity Measures: The New Greek Poetry

Karen Van Dyck (born January 25, 1961) is an American literary critic and translator. She is currently the Kimon A. Doukas Professor of Modern Greek Language and Literature in the Classics Department of Columbia University in the City of New York.

== Career ==
Born in New York City, Van Dyck grew up in St. Andrew, Scotland, Palisades, New York, Princeton, New Jersey and Melbourne, Australia. She completed her undergraduate degree in the College of Letters and Classics at Wesleyan University in 1983, and her master's degree in Modern Greek and Classics at Aristotle University of Thessaloniki in 1985. She received her D.Phil. in Medieval and Modern Languages from Oxford University in 1990 with a dissertation on The Poetics of Censorship in Greek Poetry, 1967-1990.

In 1988 she took up a position in the classics department at Columbia University, where she created and directed the interdisciplinary program in Hellenic Studies, until 2016. She was named Kimon A. Doukas Professor of Modern Greek Language and Literature in 2000 – the first chair in Modern Greek Studies to be endowed by a Greek American. She taught for the institutes for Research on Women, Sexuality, and Gender and for Comparative Literature and Society, and was also an affiliated faculty member at the European Institute, and the Sabanci Center for Turkish Studies. She also taught Classics and Women's Studies at the University of Michigan (1992-1993), and Byzantine and Modern Greek Studies at Boğaziçi University (2015).

== Honors ==
In 2022, Van Dyck received an honorary doctorate from the University of Athens for her pivotal role in translating Greek poetry into English and placing Greek poets and their poetics in the political and literary context of world literature.

Her other honors include the 2016 London Hellenic prize for her bilingual anthology of Greek poets, Austerity Measures: The New Greek Poetry, the 1990 Stavros Papastavrou Award for best doctoral thesis in the United Kingdom in Modern Greek Studies, and the 1983 Sherman Prize for Excellence in Classics.

Van Dyck has been the recipient of many research fellowships and grants, including the Marshall, ACLS, NEA, Fulbright, American Academy in Rome, American School of Classical Studies in Athens, the Columbia Institute for Ideas and Imagination, and the Heyman Center.

== Thought and work ==
Van Dyck works on Modern Greek language, literature, and culture, the Greek Diaspora, migration, gender studies, and translation theory. While committed to teaching and translating Greek literature, her approach has always been transnational and translingual. The question at the core of her critical work is how cultural productions, and particularly poetry with its minute attention to form, help us analyze larger, social patterns as well as how this can be made available to readers with different cultural and linguistic backgrounds.

Her guide Insight Guide: Greece (1988) featured a cultural dictionary with entries from Acronyms to Zorba that is still used in classrooms today. Her book Kassandra and the Censors (1998) examined Greek literature under and after the Dictatorship (1967-1974), in particular the crucial role played by women poets in creating a poetics that could escape censorship under the Colonels but could then be used to feminist ends after the regime fell. An anthology of her translations The Rehearsal of Misunderstanding (1998) made available in English the works of three of these women poets (Rhea Galanaki, Jenny Mastoraki, Maria Laina).

In an attempt to confront the uneven development across cultures and languages, her scholarly activities have increasingly concentrated on translation and translingualism. Her translation practice has taken up the challenge of translingualism: for the bilingual anthology she co-edited, A Century of Greek Poetry (2004), her translations focused on the Greek poetic tradition concerned with different languages and registers. Her task of expanding 100 years to 3000 years for the landmark volume The Greek Poets: Homer to the Present (2010) similarly involved much debate about what should be included, the multilingual parts Van Dyck's particular sphere of interest.

Van Dyck's The Scattered Papers of Penelope (2009), a Lannan Translation Selection, included new and selected poems by Katerina Anghelaki-Rooke in English translation, while her translation of Margarita Liberaki’s seminal coming-of-age novel Three Summers has been reissued twice since its initial publication in 1995, in 2019 and 2021 by NYRB and the Penguin European Writers series respectively. In 2016, the publication of Austerity Measures: The New Greek Poetry, a bilingual anthology that mapped the varied spaces of Greek poetry production during and after the recent economic crisis, moved the argument about translingualism and translation to a new level: much of the contemporary Greek poetry included in the volume was written by poets whose first language wasn't Greek or who lived outside of Greece. The collection won the London Hellenic Prize and was a New Statesman Pick of the Year and a Guardian Poetry Book-of-the-Month. Some of her most recent collaborations include The Light that Burns Us (2021), an edited collection of Greek poet Jazra Khaleed, Hers (May 2022), a translation of a collection by Maria Laina, and a forthcoming bilingual edition of her own found poems, Lifted (June 2022), translated into Greek by poet Kyoko Kishida (Eleni Bourou).

Her essays, translations and poetry have appeared in PMLA, the Journal of Modern Greek Studies, Los Angeles Review of Books, The Guardian, the Brooklyn Rail, Asymptote, The Paris Review, World Literature Today, Poiitiki, Farmakon, and Tender.

== Selected works ==
- Insight Guide: Greece (1988)
- Kassandra and the Censors: Greek Poetry since 1967 (1998; translated into Greek 2002)
- Literature Between Languages and the Question of Translation (2010)
- Ioulia Persaki: Katohi kai peina: Istories tis kathe meras [Ioulia Persaki: Everyday Stories of Occupation and Hunger] (2016; co-edited with Fay Zika)
- Lifted (2022; translated into Greek by Eleni Bourou)

== Selected translations ==
- Margarita Liberaki's novel, Three Summers (1995; 2019, revised and with a new introduction; 2021)
- The Rehearsal of Misunderstanding: Three Collections of Poetry by Contemporary Greek Women Poets (1998; editor and translator from the Greek of Rhea Galanaki's The Cake, Jenny Mastoraki's Tales of the Deep, and Maria Laina's Hers)
- A Century of Greek Poetry: 1900 – 2000 (2004; co-editor and translator with Peter Bien, Peter Constantine, and Edmund Keeley)
- The Scattered Papers of Penelope: New and Selected Poems by Katerina Anghelaki-Rooke (2008; 2009; editor and translator)
- The Greek Poets: Homer to the Present (2010; co-editor and translator with Peter Constantine, Rachel Hadas, and Edmund Keeley)
- Austerity Measures: The New Greek Poetry (2016; 2017; Greek edition 2017; editor and translator)
- Jazra Khaleed's poetry collection, The Light that Burns Us (2021; editor and translator)
- Maria Laina's poetry collection, Hers (2022)
