= Bang (magazine) =

Swedish feminist culture magazine

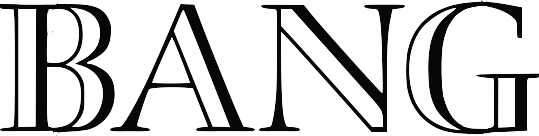
The wordmark of Bang magazine

Bang was a Swedish feminist culture and society magazine, which was subtitled Feministisk Kulturtidskrift. It was started in 1991 by students at Stockholm University. Previous editors-in-chief included Sanna Samuelsson and Valerie Kyeyune Backström. The magazine is named after Barbro Alving, whose signature was "Bang". There were four issues per year with a circulation of 7,500. The last print issue was published in December 2019, and the magazine went on online-only format. The magazine went into bankruptcy in December 2020.
