= Agnes Lidbeck =

Swedish writer (born 1981)

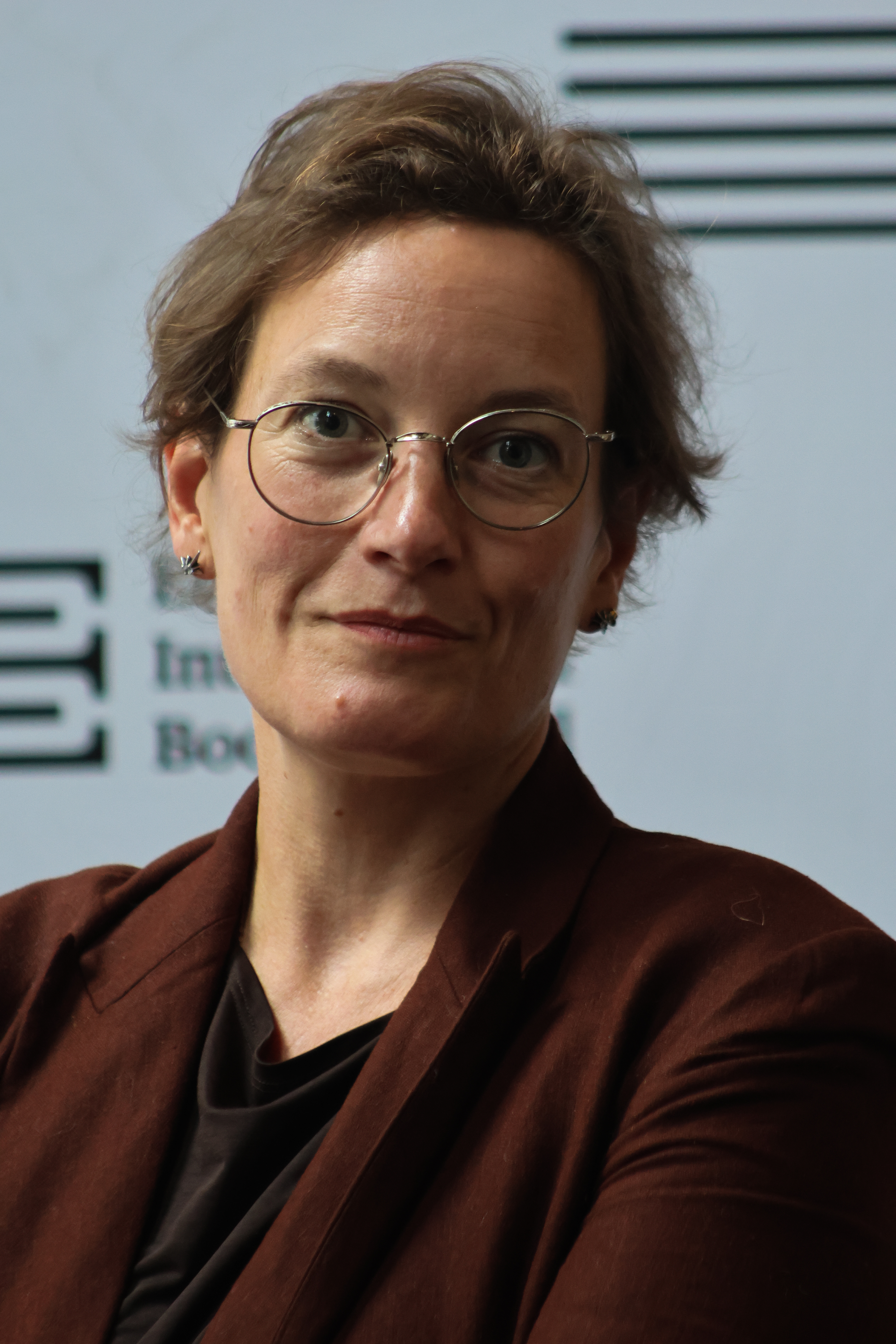
- Lidbeck at Edinburgh Book Festival '26
- Born: 15 June 1981 (age 45)
- Education: Lund University
- Writing career
- Years active: 2017–present

Agnes Lidbeck (born 15 June 1981) is a Swedish writer. Her debut novel Supporting Act (2017) won critical acclaim. It was shortlisted for the Svenska Dagbladet Prize and won Borås Tidnings debutantpris. It was also translated into English by Nichola Smalley for Peirene Press.

She was born on 15 June 1981. She was raised in Smedslätten, a district of Bromma in Stockholm. She studied literary studies, history, and psychology at Lund University from 1999 to 2005.

== Bibliography ==
- Supporting Act (2017)
- Förlåten (2018)
- Gå förlorad (2019)
- Nikes bok (2021)
- All min kärlek (2023)
