= Phaedra (film) =

1962 film directed by Jules Dassin

- Directed by: Jules Dassin
- Written by: Jules Dassin; Margarita Liberaki
- Based on: Hippolytus; 428 B.C. play by Euripides
- Produced by: Jules Dassin
- Starring: Melina Mercouri; Anthony Perkins
- Cinematography: Jacques Natteau
- Edited by: Roger Dwyre
- Music by: Mikis Theodorakis
- Production companies: Jorilie; Melinafilm
- Distributed by: Lopert Pictures Corporation
- Release date: October 18, 1962 (New York City)
- Running time: 115 minutes
- Countries: United States; France; Greece
- Languages: English; Greek
- Budget: $900,000

Phaedra (Greek: Φαίδρα) is a 1962 American-Greek drama film directed by Jules Dassin as a vehicle for his partner (and future wife) Melina Mercouri, after her worldwide hit Never on Sunday.

The film was the fourth collaboration between Dassin and Mercouri, who took the title role. Greek writer Margarita Liberaki adapted Euripides' Hippolytus into a melodrama concerning the rich society of ship owners and their families, but still containing some of the tragic elements of the ancient drama. The film is set in Paris, London, and the Greek island of Hydra.

== Plot ==
Phaedra, second wife of shipping tycoon Thanos, falls in love with her husband's son from his first marriage, Alexis. The love is doomed from the very beginning but they are unable to control their feelings.

== Cast ==
- Melina Mercouri as Phaedra
- Anthony Perkins as Alexis
- Raf Vallone as Thanos
- Élisabeth Ercy as Ercy
- Georges Sari as Ariadne
- Andreas Philippides as Andreas
- Olympia Papadouka as Anna
- Stelios Vokovich as Stavros
- Nikos Tzogias as Felere (as Nicos Tzoyas)
- Depy Martini as Heleni
- Alexis Pezas as Dimitris
- Kostas Baladimas as Dimos (as Dimos Baladinas)
- Marc Bohan as himself (uncredited)
- Jules Dassin as Christos (uncredited)

== Production ==
Phaedra was filmed in Greece, France, and Great Britain. The production company Jorilie Productions is only credited by the American copyright source and the films status as a French co-production is unconfirmed.

The movie was released in 1962. It was a hit in Europe but a box-office failure in the USA. Although Mercouri and Perkins became friends during the filming, the magazines, and especially Esquire magazine, attacked the film, because of Perkins's vulnerability. Phaedra was one of several films that teamed Perkins with notable older female stars.

== Soundtrack ==
The music was composed by Mikis Theodorakis. In the soundtrack, Melina Mercouri sang two songs. The first one was written by Nikos Gatsos, a major Greek poet, and was sung by Mercouri and Perkins after their love scene in Paris. The other one was heard in the film as the main love theme. Both of the songs are popular in Greece and they have been performed by hundreds of singers and actors.

The toccata from Johann Sebastian Bach's Toccata and Fugue for organ in F major, BWV 540 was used prominently in the film.

== Home media ==
Phaedra was released to DVD by MGM Home Entertainment on June 6, 2011, as a Region 1 fullscreen DVD-on-demand disc via MGM's Limited Edition Collection available through Amazon.

== See also ==
- List of American films of 1962
