= Athena Farrokhzad =

Iranian-Swedish poet and playwright

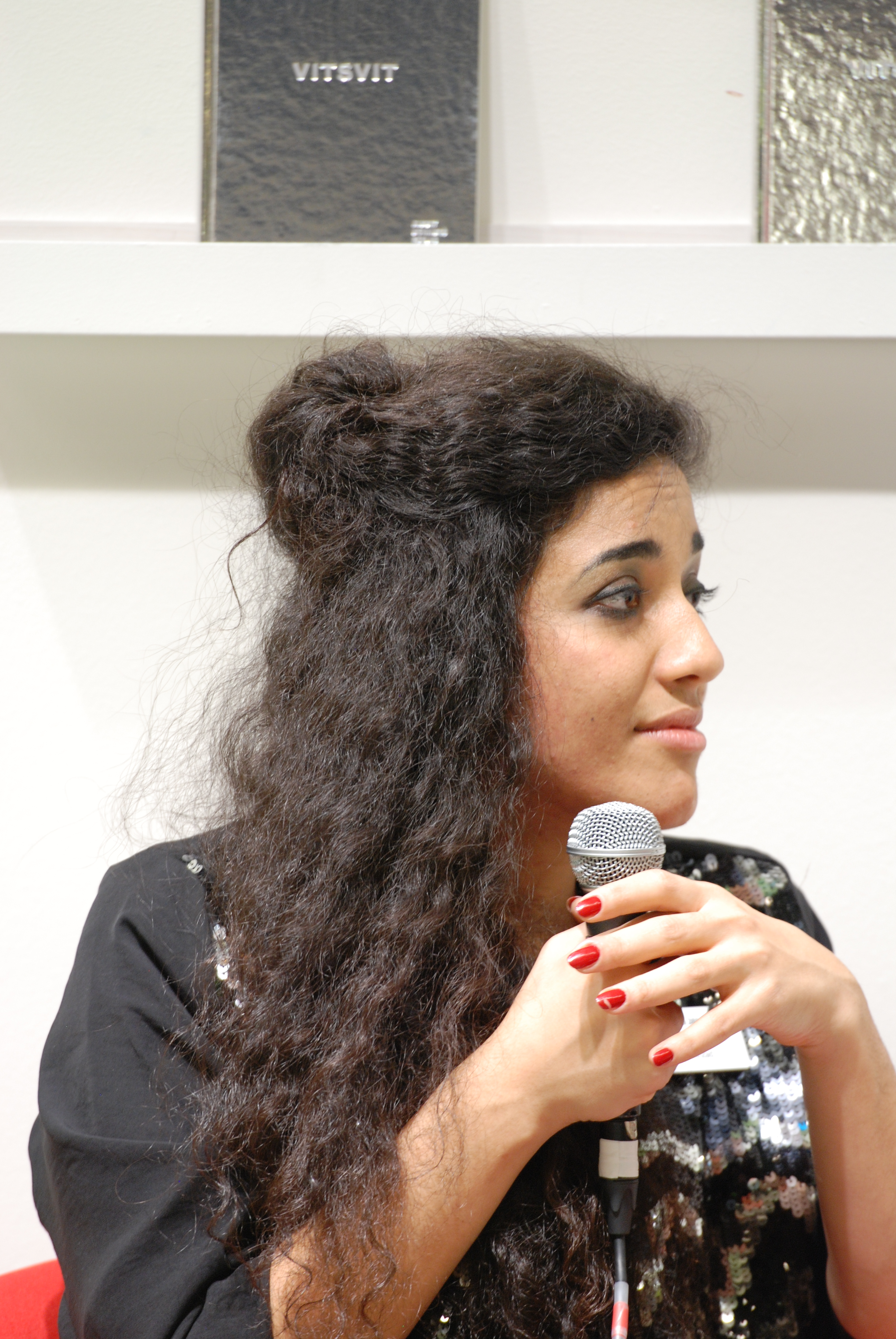
- Athena Farrokhzad (2013)
- Born: 23 August 1983 (age 43); Teheran, Iran
- Occupations: Poet, playwright

Athena Farrokhzad (Persian: آتنا فرخزاد; born 23 August 1983) is an Iranian-Swedish poet, playwright, translator, and literary critic.

== Life ==
Farrokhzad was born in Tehran, Iran, and grew up in the Hammarkullen and Askim areas of Gothenburg, Sweden. She now lives in Bagarmossen, a suburb of Stockholm.

She is an instructor in the writing program at Nordens folk high school on the island of Biskops-Arnö in Lake Mälaren.

== Publications ==
In 2013, Farrokhzad published a collection of poems titled Vitsvit with Albert Bonniers Förlag. The same year, her translation into Swedish of work by the Romanian poet Svetlana Cârstean was released, and she made her debut as a playwright with Päron, which was performed by the youth section of the Östgöta Theatre, directed by Kajsa Isakson.

White Blight, Jennifer Hayashida's translation of Vitsvit, was published by Argos Books in 2015. It was shortlisted for the 2016 National Translation Award in Poetry, named one of The Boston Globe's best poetry books of 2016, and reviewed in Slate, The Rumpus, The Kenyon Review, and The Southeast Review. As of 2019, Vitsvit has been translated into 12 languages.

Vitsvit has been adapted into a theatre play on two occasions; one production by Unga Klara directed by Farnaz Arbabi, and one by the Swedish Radio Theatre directed by Saga Gärde.

Farrokhzad has published two poetry collections, Manualen with Tova Gerge and Ett tunt underlag with the poetry group G=T=B=R=G, both in 2009. She edited the queer poetry anthology Omslag with Linn Hansén. She is also a literature critic for the newspaper Aftonbladet.

== Sommar episode ==
Farrokhzad hosted the Sveriges Radio show Sommar on P1 on 21 July 2014. Gunnar Axén of the Moderate Party expressed the opinion that her decision to play the Ebba Grön song "Beväpna er" ("Arm yourselves") was inappropriate and claimed to have thrown out his television so he could stop paying the license fee that all households pay to fund both television and radio. Others reacted more positively, including Ebba Grön lead singer Joakim Thåström and some reporters and listeners. As of 25 July 2014 there had been 70 complaints to the Swedish Broadcasting Commission concerning Farrokhzad's episode, the most complaints received about any host of the program. However, the show was cleared on all counts. Farrokhzad was not included by Sveriges Television in the line-up for the television discussion show Sommarpratarna, but the program-makers denied she was left out due to the controversy surrounding her radio show.

== Honors ==
Vitsvit was nominated for the 2013 August Prize in the literature category, Borås Tidnings debutantpris, and Catapult Prize of the Swedish Writers' Union. Farrokhzad was joint winner of the Karin Boye Literary Prize in 2013 and in 2014 won the Stora Läsarpriset.
