= Barbro Alving =

Swedish journalist and writer

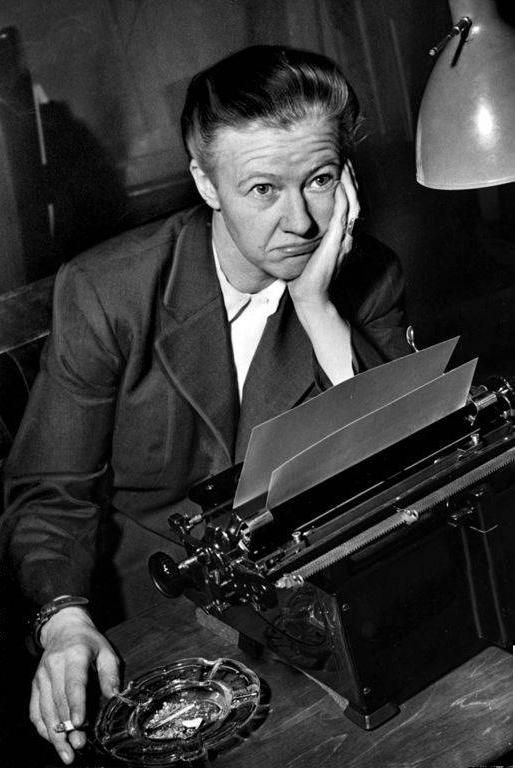
- Alving in 1951
- Born: 12 January 1909; Uppsala, Sweden
- Died: 22 January 1987 (aged 78); Stockholm, Sweden
- Occupations: Journalist and writer
- Children: 1
- Writing career
- Pen name: Bang
- Genres: Screenplay and biography

Barbro Alving (12 January 1909 – 22 January 1987) was a Swedish journalist and writer, a pacifist and feminist, often using the pseudonym Bang. She wrote for, among others, the Swedish newspaper Dagens Nyheter and the magazines Idun and Vecko-Journalen. She reported from various scenes during the Spanish Civil War, World War II and the Cold War.

== Biography ==
Alving was born in Uppsala, as the youngest daughter of the author and columnist Fanny Alving and Hjalmar Alving, who was a lecturer in Scandinavian languages and Nordic literature. At the age of eleven she moved with her family to Stockholm, where Hjalmar Alving had been appointed headmaster at Whitlockska samskolan. Alving was enrolled at Whitlockska, and graduated in 1928.

Alving never married, but she had a daughter, Maud Fanny Alving, with illustrator and artist Birger Lundquist in 1938. Maud, better known as Ruffa Alving-Olin, was also a journalist, who collected and published letters, notes and other materials after Barbro Alving's death. Alving formed a household with Anna Laura Sjöcrona when her daughter was one year old, and the three constituted "a different kind of family", in Ruffa's words. Alving and Sjöcrona lived together for over 40 years, until Alving's death.

== Career ==
Alving was an editorial secretary at the weekly magazine Idun from 1928 to 1931, and then a journalist at Dagens Nyheter from 1934 to 1959. At the age of 27 she reported from the 1936 Olympic Games in Berlin and the Spanish Civil War. Dagens Nyheter also sent her as a reporter to write about the Finnish Winter War in 1939-40, the German occupation of Norway in 1940, and the Hungarian Revolution in 1956. As a foreign correspondent, she reported from the United States, Vietnam, Africa and the Far East over a number of years.

Alving became a pacifist, and converted to Catholicism in 1959. She supported the campaign in the 1950s to prevent Sweden from acquiring nuclear weapons. Because of her convictions, she left Dagens Nyheter, whose editor-in-chief was in favour of a Swedish nuclear defence, and started working at the weekly magazine Vecko-Journalen. She was called to do civil defence duty, but refused to participate and was jailed at Långholmen Prison in Stockholm for one month. She wrote of her period in prison in her book Dagbok från Långholmen (Diary of Långholmen) (1956).

Alving was inspired as a journalist, feminist and pacifist by Elin Wägner. She collected biographical material after Wägner's death in 1949, which later became a biography written by Ulla Isaksson and Erik Hjalmar Linder.

She published a number of books, including an annual volume of collected newspaper columns under the pseudonym "Käringen mot strömmen" ("old woman against the current", alluding to a 12th-century Swedish proverb); these were published from 1946 to 1973. She also wrote several screenplays, and was awarded the Nios Grand Prize in 1975. The feminist magazine Bang is named after her.

== Gallery ==
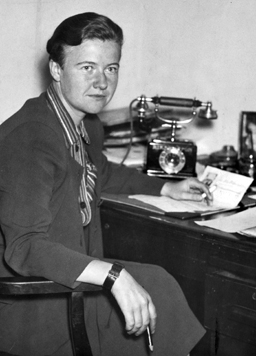
Barbro Alving, 1939.

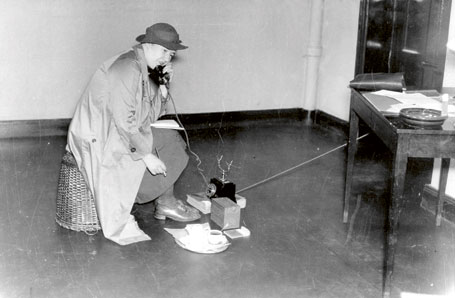
Barbro Alving, 1939.

== Further information ==
- Stenborg, Elisabeth (Spring 2001). "Som det verkligen var - Barbro Alving (Bang) i dagböcker och brev". HumaNetten (in Swedish) (8). School of Humanities, Linnaeus University. doi:10.15626/hn.20010804. ISSN 1403-2279.
- "Bang och världshistorien", 2008 film about Barbro Alving as a war correspondent by Maj Wechselmann. In Swedish. Shown on Sveriges Television program K Special on 30 December 2008 and 4 January 2009.
