= Edith Hammar =

Finnish illustrator (born 1992)

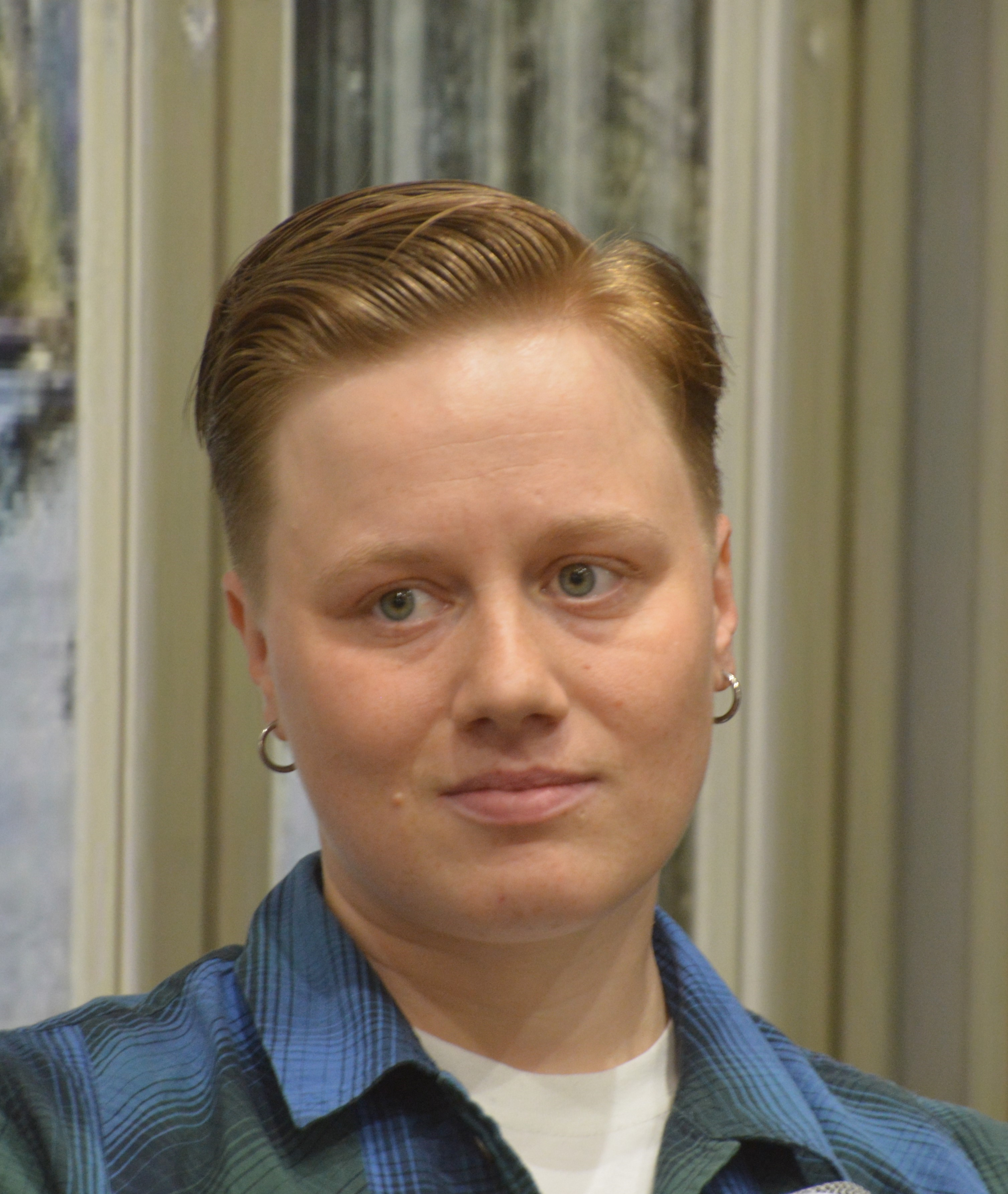
- Edith Hammar at the 2023 Gothenburg Book Fair
- Born: 1992 (age 32–33); Helsinki, Finland
- Education: Royal Institute of Art (2014–2017); BA in fine art
- Website: elmhammar.com

Edith Hammar (born 1992) is a Finland Swedish artist and illustrator. They debuted with their first book in 2020 with the graphic novel Homo Line.

== Biography ==
Hammar was born and grew up in Helsinki, but has also lived in Stockholm and currently resides in Gothenburg. In 2017 they graduated with a Bachelor of Arts in fine art from the Royal Institute of Art in Stockholm. Hammar is non-binary.

== Works ==
Hammar has published two graphic novels, Homo Line (2020) and Portal (2023). Portal received the queer literature award Prisma for Comic of the Year in December 2023. In 2021 they designed a memorial to the first recorded Swedish LGBT march, which took place in Örebro in 1971. The memorial is displayed outside Örebro City Hall.
