= Prisma (literary award) =

Annual nordic queer literary award

Prisma is an annual literary award for Nordic queer literature. The award was started on the initiative of the queer bookstore Page 28 in Malmö and the platform Bögbibblan. The inaugural awards were given in December 2023. The awards have been viewed positively for their larger size and ambitions, including a total of seven categories, each with separate jury groups for a total of 50 jury members.

== 2023 ==
In 2023 30 works were nominated to receive the award. The awards gala was held on 11 December 2023 at Malmö Opera.

=== Winners ===
- Children and youth book of the year: En vän till tant Irene by Ellen Svedjeland, Elin Johansson, Emma Adbåge
- Poetry collection of the year: Tvätta och bli tvättad by Sara Hallström
- Non-fiction work of the year: Trans. Fakta, forskning och erfarenheter by Edward Summanen and Matilda Wurm
- Nordic work of the year: Hund, stille by Luka Holmegaard
- Novel of the year: Mjölkat by Sanna Samuelsson
- Comic of the year: Portal by Edith Hammar
- Translation of the year: allt det här nu by Anna Stern, translation by Ebba Högström
