= Urszula Honek =

Polish poet

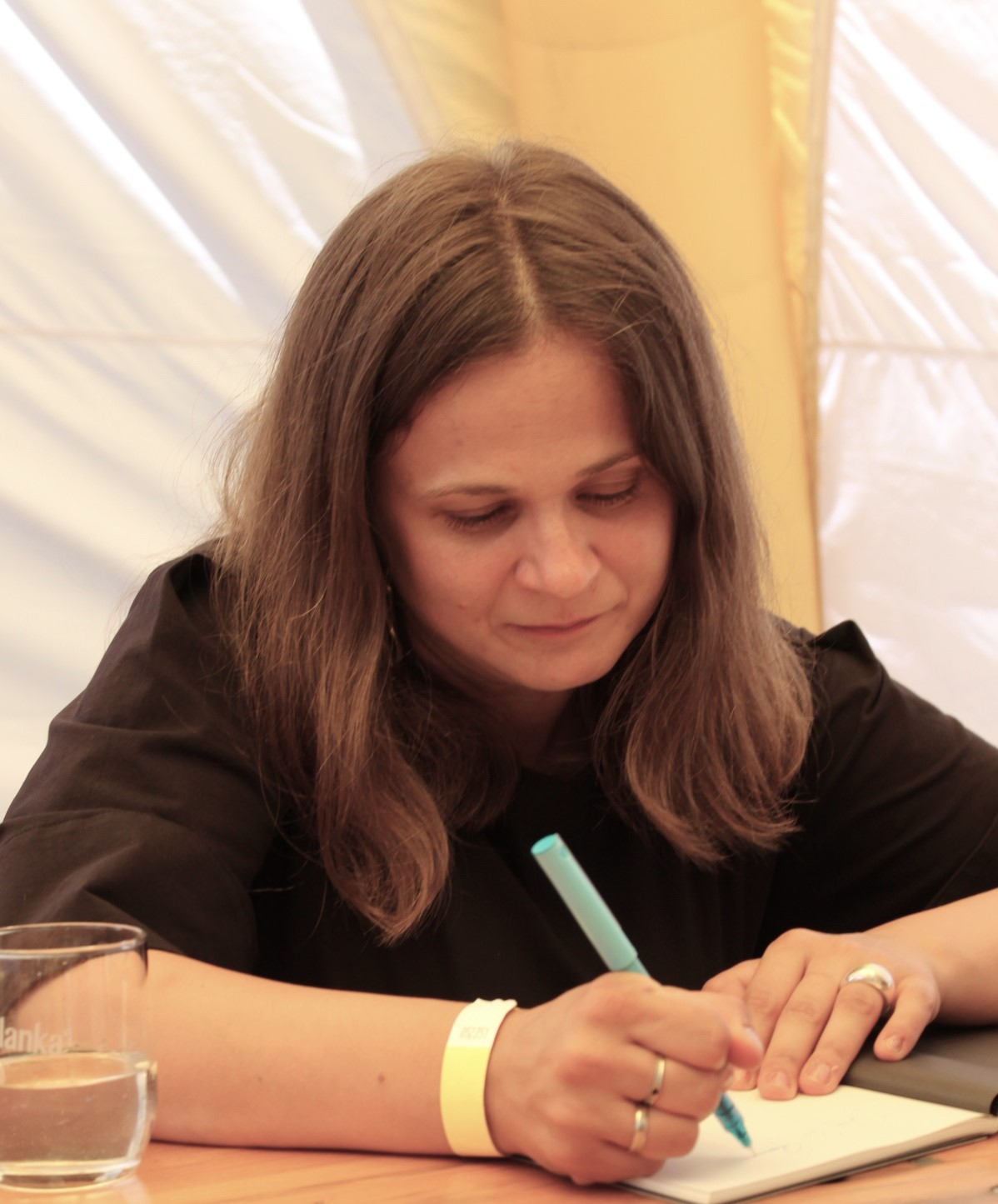
Honek in 2024

Urszula Honek (born 1987) is a Polish poet and writer of fiction. Her debut short story collection, White Nights, was longlisted for the 2024 International Booker Prize and shortlisted for the 2024 Warwick Prize for Women in Translation.

== Biography ==
Honek was born in Racławice near Gorlice in 1987. She lives in Kraków.

== Career ==
Honek has won a number of Polish national poetry competitions, including, in 2013, the Rainer Maria Rilke Poetry Competition. In 2016, she published Sporysz, her first poetry book, which was a finalist in the K.I. Gałczyński Orfeusz Poetry Award. In 2018, her second poetry collection, Pod wezwaniem, was also a finalist in the K.I. Gałczyński Orfeusz Poetry Award, as was her third poetry collection, Zimowanie, in 2021. Zimowanie, which translates as "Wintering", consists of very short, often one-line poems.

Honek's short story collection, White Nights, consists of thirteen short stories describing the misfortunes that befall a group of people who grew up together in the same village in the Polish Carpathians. The prose of the book was characterized as "poetic". It was translated to English by Kate Webster. The English translation was longlisted for the International Booker Prize and shortlisted for the Warwick Prize for Women in Translation.

== Books ==
- Sporysz (Wojewódzka Biblioteka Publiczna i Centrum Animacji Kultury, Poznań, 2015) ISBN 978-83-64504-29-7.
- Pod wezwaniem (Wojewódzka Biblioteka Publiczna i Centrum Animacji Kultury, Poznań, 2018) ISBN 978-83-65772-50-3.
- Zimowanie (Wojewódzka Biblioteka Publiczna i Centrum Animacji Kultury, Poznań, 2021) ISBN 978-83-66453-49-4.
- Białe noce (White Nights, Wydawnictwo Czarne, Wołowiec, 2020) ISBN 978-83-8191-401-7.
  - White Nights (Two Lines, 2025) ISBN 978-1-949641-91-2
- Poltergeist (Wydawnictwo Warstwy, Wrocław, 2024) ISBN 978-83-67186-89-6.
