= The Hole (Oyamada novel) =

Novel by Hiroko Oyamada

- First edition (Shinchōsha, 2014)
- Author: Hiroko Oyamada
- Original title: Ana 穴
- Translator: David Boyd
- Language: Japanese
- Genre: Psychological Fiction, Absurdist fiction
- Publisher: New Directions
- Publication date: January 24, 2014
- Publication place: Japan
- English publication date: October 6, 2020
- Media type: Print (Paperback)
- Pages: 92 (English)
- Award: Akutagawa Prize
- ISBN: 978-0-8112-2887-9

The Hole (Japanese: 穴, Hepburn: Ana) is a novel by Hiroko Oyamada. Originally published in 2014, it is Oyamada's second novel to be translated into English, after The Factory. Translated by David Boyd, an Assistant Professor of Japanese at the University of North Carolina at Charlotte, the novel was published in 2020 by New Directions. The first-person narrator, Asahi, a frustrated Japanese housewife, recounts the story featuring several overarching themes concerning strict gender roles of Japanese society.

== Plot ==
A couple move to the house next to the husband's parents due to the husband's job transfer. To the wife, this new location is boring, but one day while walking she sees a mysterious animal. Following it, she falls into a hole. She hears from her husband's reclusive brother that the animal digs these kinds of holes, but they have no luck finding the hole that she fell into when they try to search for it. Later, the wife and the husband's grandfather fall into similar holes again. After this, the grandfather dies of pneumonia and the husband's brother disappears. Finally, the wife gets a job at a convenience store, but looking in the mirror, she sees the reflection of her mother-in-law.

== Main characters ==
- Asahi "Asa" Matsuura, often referred to as "the bride" by the town's people, is the narrator and protagonist of the story. Her often confused perspective adds a substantial level of uncertainty to the events of the novel.
- Muneaki Matsuura is Asahi's husband. Often pictured reading from his phone, he is absent from most of the novel despite being the reason for the move that sets off the events of the story. Because of this, Muneaki is implied to be neglectful of his wife.
- Tomiko Matsuura is at first seen as a supportive and kind mother-in-law, but throughout the novel is proven to be a silently manipulative woman, using her proximity to Asahi's new home to maintain her control.
- Asahi's brother-in-law, referred to as "Sensei" by the town's children, is a self-described "hikikomori," or shut-in. Notably, he is never given a proper name, and no one else in the novel seems to mention him, leaving it to the reader whether he truly exists.
- "Grandpa", Tomiko's father-in-law, is silent throughout most of the novel. His midnight excursion from his home and subsequent death mark the climax and falling action of the novel respectively.
- Sera is Asahi's neighbor, whom she meets after falling into the hole in which the book is named after. She is the first character to refer to Asahi as "the bride." She is often described as wearing all white.

== Themes ==
There are many themes discussed throughout the book dealing with society's expectations of young people, especially women, in Japan.

=== Finances ===
Finances are a recurring pressure described throughout the novel. Asahi's conversation with a coworker about the mistreatment of temporary workers is the first evidence of this, and it proves to be a consistent theme. The move to the countryside is made in large part because the family home they move into is rent free. Further, one of the first actions Asahi makes while in her new home is looking for local job openings in the area. She even feels bad for spending any money on air conditioning or entertainment in the new home because of her lack of a job.

=== Transformation ===
The theme of transformation, or change, is noted both in the dramatic change in lifestyle that Asahi is forced to endure after the move and the shift in reality that is hinted at as possible hallucinations. Other symbols that hint at the underlying theme of transformation is the overwhelming influence of cicadas and the intense change in seasons after Asahi's move.

=== Gender ===
The constraints of gender roles are a consistent theme of the novel. The men of society are rarely mentioned and when mentioned, rarely by their proper names, merely referenced by their familial relation. They are reduced to the "laborers" of the household, and women are left to tend to the house and children, if there are any. Asahi experiences this firsthand and is surprised when the people she meets in her new town refer to her only as "the bride."

=== Isolation ===
The theme of isolation is recurrent throughout the novel, both in the physical location of Asahi's new home and the relationships between characters. Asahi makes few friends in her new life as a housewife, and her brother-in-law is a hikikomori who is neglected by everyone in the town, including his own family which never even speaks of his existence.

=== Alice in Wonderland Allusion ===
The author closely parallels her characters with those of Alice in Wonderland, mentioning the book by name in the dialogue with Asahi's brother-in-law. Asahi plays the role of Alice with her brother-in-law being a self-declared white rabbit, although other interpretations compare him more to a mad hatter. Much like Carroll's novel, after the protagonist falls in the hole, the reader is left to decide which details of the story exist in reality and which are figments of the character's imagination.

== Reception ==
Many reviews praise Oyamada for her Kafkaesque and bizarre writing style. Lain Maloney of The Japan Times discusses how this writing style transforms a metaphor into something much more real. Another review, published by the Japanese magazine Metropolis, notes Oyamada's ability to create these mysteries with seemingly no clear ending as one of her greatest strengths.

== Award ==
In 2014, Oyamada received the 150th Akutagawa Prize, an award presented by the Society for the Promotion of Japanese Literature.
