= Marit Kapla =

Swedish cultural manager and writer

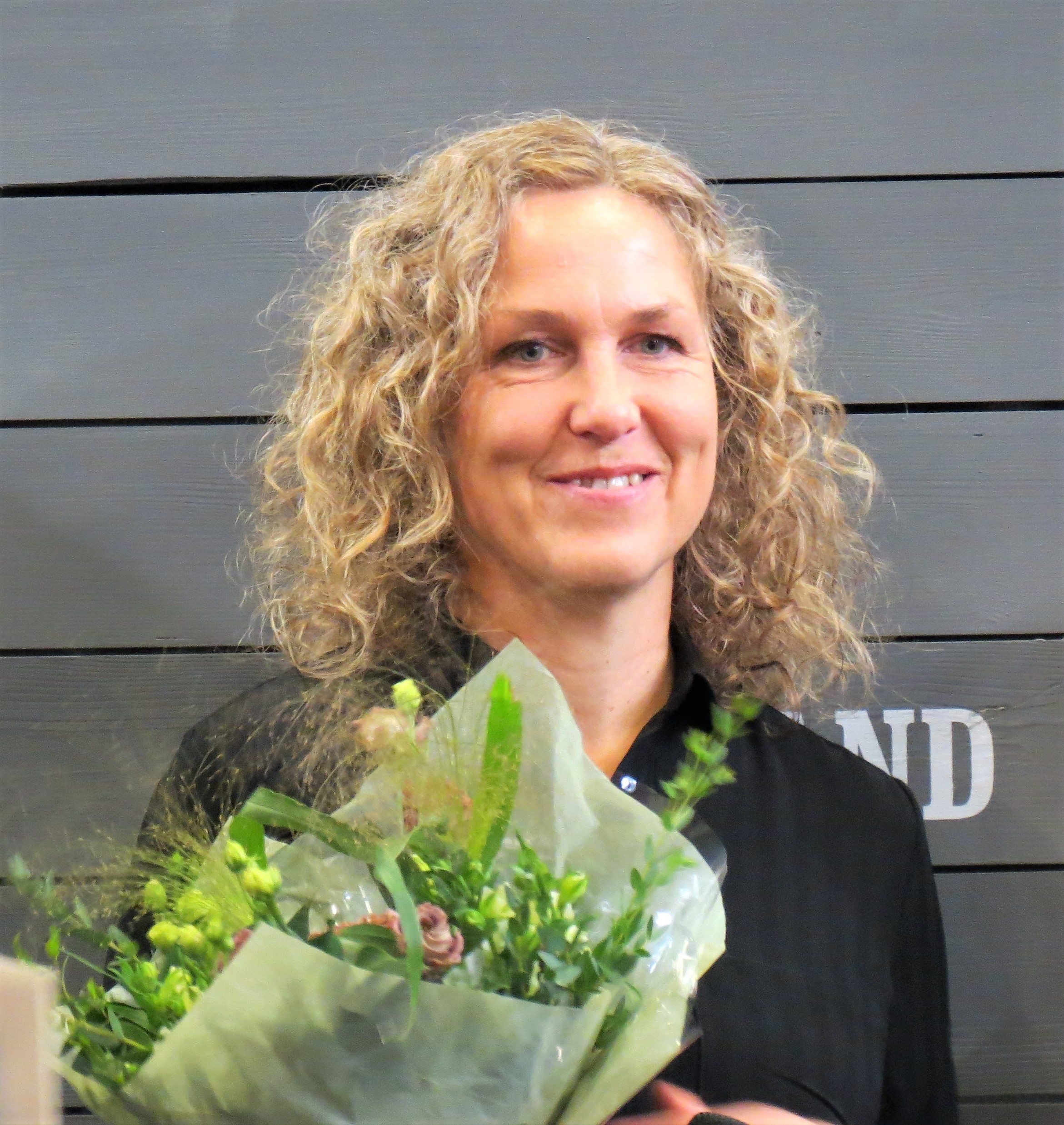
- Born: 4 September 1970 (age 55)
- Occupations: Writer, journalist, cultural manager

Marit Kapla (born 4 September 1970) is a Swedish writer, journalist and cultural manager. Her debut novel Osebol won the 2019 August Prize.

== Private life ==
Marit Kapla was born on 4 September 1970. She grew up a Swedish village called Osebol, which is located in Torsby Municipality, Värmland County.

She lives in Gothenburg.

== Career ==
She started her career by working in journalism. First, she worked at a local newspaper, then moved to Gothenburg, where she eventually worked for the Sveriges Television on the Filmkrönikan. In the years 2007–2014, Kapla worked as the director of the Gothenburg Film Festival, then for the next two years served as the program director of its digital streaming service. In the years 2016–2020, she was one of the two editors-in-chief of the journal Ord och Bild.

In 2019, Kapla published her debut book Osebol, which recounts the stories of almost all inhabitants of the village in the form of excerpts from her interviews with them. The work brought her the 2019 August Prize, the Guldpennan prize awarded by the Swedish Publicists' Association, Studieförbundet Vuxenskolans author prize 2019, Borås Tidnings debutantpris 2020 and Göran Palm Scholarship 2021. The English version of the book, translated by Peter Graves, won the 2022 Warwick Prize for Women in Translation and was nominated for the British Academy Book Prize for Global Cultural Understanding. The musician Martin Hederos set fragments of Osebol to music.

In 2022, Kapla published her second book, Kärlek på svenska, which also consisted of interviews, this time on the topic of love. However, Kapla did not conduct the interviews herself and based her book on the work of the filmmaker Staffan Julén instead. The book was nominated for the 2023 European Union Prize for Literature.

== Works ==
- Osebol, 2019
- Kärlek på svenska, 2022
