= Margarita Karapanou =

Greek novelist (1946–2008)

- Born: 19 July 1946; Athens, Greece
- Died: 2 December 2008 (aged 62); Athens, Greece
- Occupation: Novelist
- Writing career
- Period: 1976–2008

Margarita Karapanou (Greek: Μαργαρίτα Καραπάνου; 19 July 1946 – 2 December 2008) was a Greek novelist, most known for her first novel, Kassandra and the Wolf. Her novels have been translated into many languages.

== Life and career ==
Margarita Karapanou was born in Athens, Greece, the daughter of novelist and dramatist Margarita Liberaki and Giorgos Karapanos, a lawyer and poet. Her parents divorced and her mother moved to Paris shortly after she was born. Karapanou grew up in both Athens, with her maternal grandmother, and with her mother in Paris. She studied philosophy and cinema in Paris, and nursery school teaching through distance education in London. In Paris, she was friends with Marie-France Ionesco, the daughter of Eugène Ionesco.

Karapanou worked as a nursery school teacher and also at a private kindergarten. She struggled with bipolar disorder throughout her life.

Kassandra and the Wolf was translated into English by Nikos C. Germanacos and published by Harcourt Brace in 1976 before it was published in Greece.

Her own translation into French of her 1985 novel The Sleepwalker won the Prix du Meilleur livre étranger in 1988.

Her diaries, Η ζωή είναι αγρίως απίθανη: Ημερολόγια 1959-1979 (Life Is Wildly Improbable: Diaries 1959-1979), were published in November 2008, shortly before she died of respiratory problems on 2 December 2008.

== Works ==
Novels

- Η Κασσάνδρα και ο Λύκος [Ī Kassándra kai o Lýkos] (Hermēs, 1977). Kassandra and the Wolf, trans. Nikos C. Germanacos (Harcourt Brace Jovanovich, 1976; Clockroot, 2009).
- Ο υπνοβάτης [O hypnovátis] (Hermēs, 1985). The Sleepwalker, trans. Karen Emmerich (Clockroot, 2011).
- Rien ne va plus (Hermēs, 1991). Trans. Karen Emmerich (Clockroot, 2009).
- Ναι [Nai] (Ōkeanida, 1999). Yes.
- Lee και Lou [Lee kai Lou] (Ōkeanida, 2003). Lee and Lou.
- Μαμά (Ōkeanida, 2004). Mama.

Other

- Μήπως; [Mípōs?] (Ōkeanida, 2006). Maybe? Conversations with psychologist and writer Fotini Tsalikoglou.
- Η ζωή είναι αγρίως απίθανη [Ī zōī́ eínai agríōs apíthanī́] (Ōkeanida, 2008). Life Is Wildly Improbable: Diaries 1959-1979 (Edited by Vassilis Kimoulis)

In anthologies

- "The hour of the Wolf". In Rotter, P. (1975). Bitches & sad ladies: An anthology of fiction by and about women. New York: Harper's Magazine Press. ISBN 9780061275159
- "Word". in Biguenet, J. (1978). Foreign fictions: 25 contemporary stories from Canada, Europe, Latin America. New York: Vintage Books. ISBN 9780394724935
- "Kassandra" and "The Wolf". In Manguel, A. (1993). The gates of paradise: The anthology of erotic short fiction. New York: C. Potter. ISBN 9780517880500
- "Kalymnos". In Leontis, A. (1997). Greece: A traveler's literary companion. San Francisco, Calif: Whereabouts Press. ISBN 9781883513047
- "Island Melancholy" (2008). Mediterranean Passages: Readings from Dido to Derrida. University of North Carolina Press ISBN 9780807831830
