= Amanda Svensson =

Swedish author (born 1987)

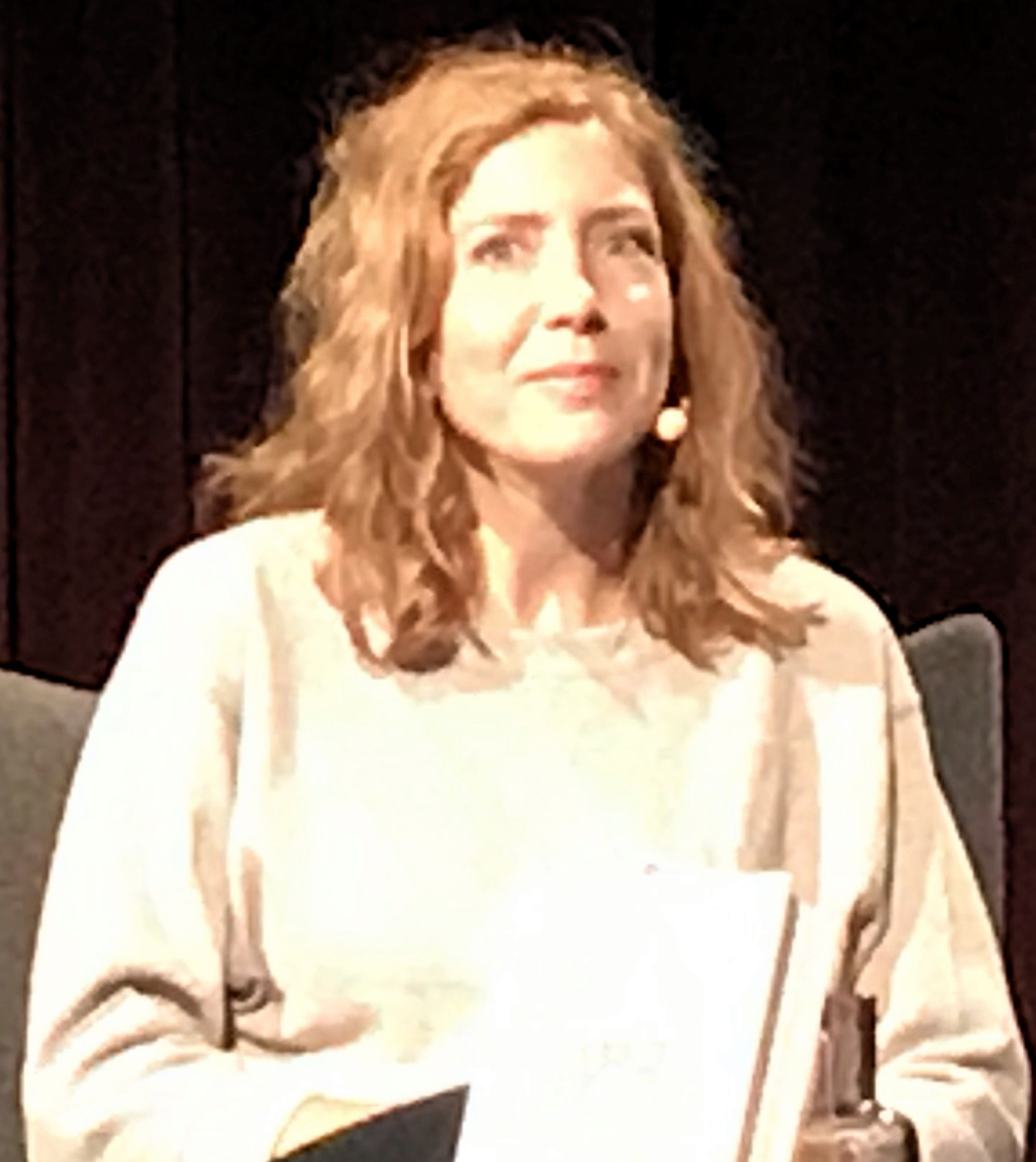
Amanda Svensson in 2019

Amanda Sofia Svensson (born 5 June 1987) is a Swedish author of novels. Her second novel, Välkommen till den här världen, was shortlisted for Sweden's August Prize. The English translation of her fourth novel, A System so Magnificent it is Blinding, was shortlisted for the Warwick Prize for Women in Translation.

== Biography ==
Born in Arlöv as the daughter of journalist Per Svensson and Ann-Sofie Svensson, she grew up in Malmö. She started writing at a young age. She studied at Fridhems folkhögskola in Svalöv between 2006 and 2008. In 2011, she began studying literature and French at Lund University.

== Career ==
Svensson's debut novel, Hey Dolly, was published in 2008.

Her second book, Välkommen till den här världen, was shortlisted for the August Prize in 2011.

Her fourth novel, Ett system så magnifikt att det bländar, was published in 2019. It was awarded the Per Olov Enquist Literary Prize and Svenska Dagbladet’s Literature Prize. It was also shortlisted for Tidningen Vi’s Literature Prize. An English translation by Nichola Smalley, A System so Magnificent it is Blinding, was published in 2022 and was shortlisted for the 2023 Warwick Prize for Women in Translation. It was also longlisted for the 2023 International Booker Prize.

Svensson also works as a translator, and has translated works by Ali Smith, Tessa Hadley, and Kristen Roupenian.

Om 17 August 2012, Svensson presented an episode of the Sveriges Radio show Sommar i P1.

== Bibliography ==
- 2008 – Hey Dolly, Norstedts ISBN 9789113064208
- 2011 – Välkommen till den här världen
- 2014 – Allt det där jag sa till dig var sant
- 2019 – Ett system så magnifikt att det bländar
- 2023 – Själens telegraf

== Works in English translation ==
- 2022 – A System so Magnificent it is Blinding (Ett system så magnifikt att det bländar), translated by Nichola Smalley
