= Maxim Grigoriev (author) =

Swedish writer and translator

Maxim Grigoriev is a Swedish writer and translator of Russian origin. He was born in 1980 in Moscow and only moved to Sweden in his teens.

His first book, a short story collection titled Städer (Cities) won Borås Tidnings debutantpris for debut authors. In 2016, his first novel Nu (Now) appeared. In 2021, he won the EU Prize for Literature for his novel Europa.

He is a regular contributor to Svenska Dagbladet and the Swedish magazine Axess. Grigoriev is also a literary translator, and has translated the works of Olga Slavnikova and Venedikt Yerofeyev from Russian into Swedish.

He has lived in Berlin and Porto and now lives in Paris with his wife and two children.
