= Sara Mannheimer =

Swedish novelist

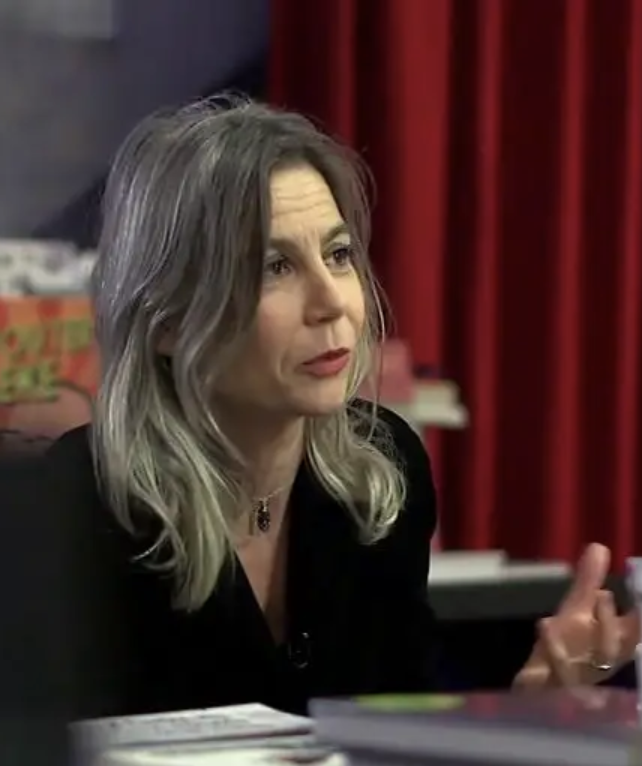
- Mannheimer in a 2012 interview
- Born: May 26, 1967 (age 59); Lund, Sweden
- Occupations: Author; Artist

Sara Mannheimer (born 26 May 1967, in Lund) is a Swedish novelist. She hails from Gothenburg and was educated in the US, Holland, and the Czech Republic. Her debut novel Reglerna (The Rules, 2008) was nominated for the August Prize and won the debut writers' prize from Borås Tidning newspaper. Another novel Handlingen (The Action) was nominated for Swedish Radio's best novel prize, and won the EU Prize for Literature.

Besides writing, she runs a glassblowing studio. She has collaborated with the choreographer Birgitta Egerbladh on an acclaimed dance theatre project titled Come Rushing. She lives in Stockholm.

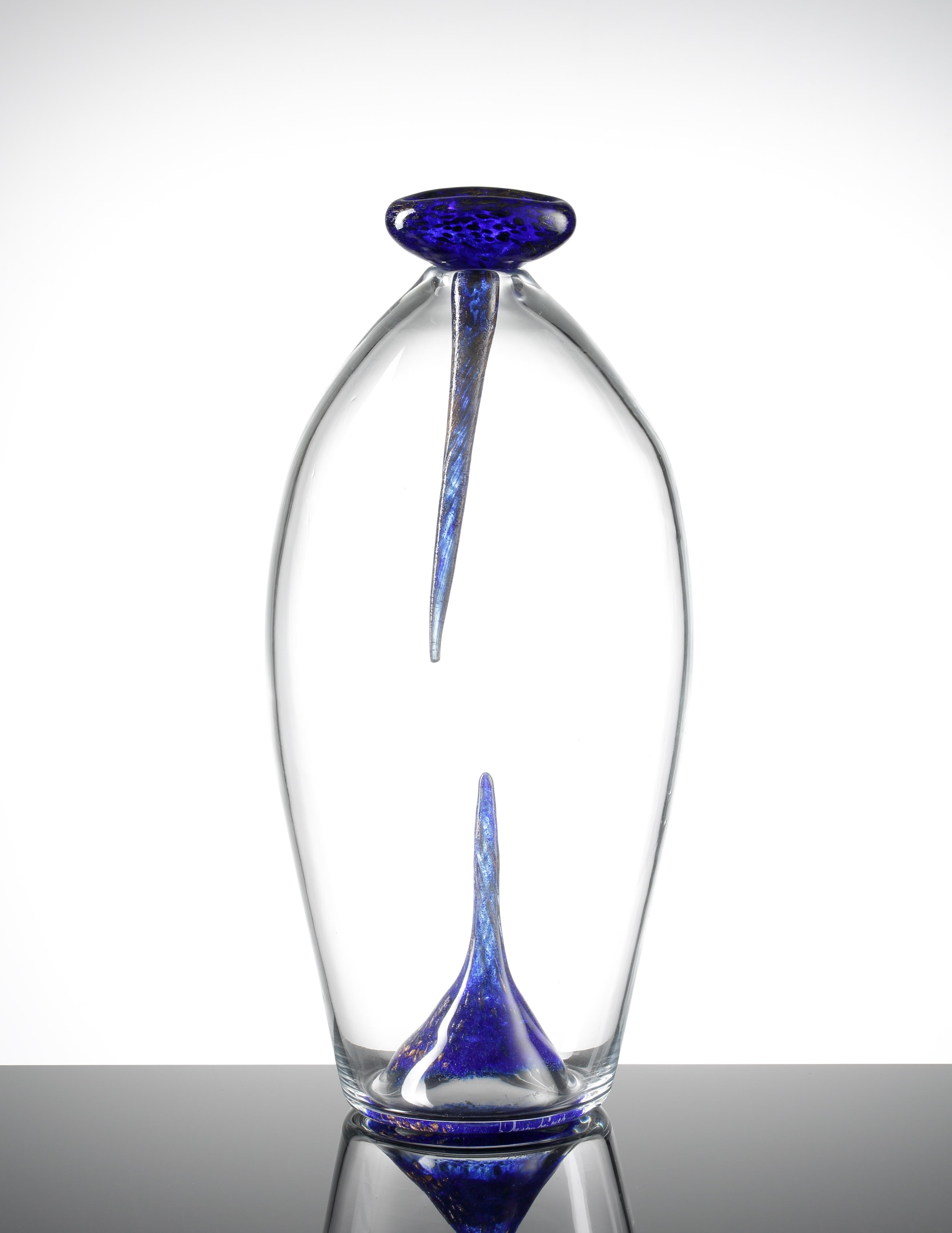
Glass carafe Nipple by Sara Mannheimer 1998
