= Tone Schunnesson =

Swedish writer

Tone Live Schunnesson (born 17 January 1988) is a Swedish novelist and playwright.

Schunnesson studied writing at Biskops Arnös författarskola. In 2016, she debuted with the novel Tripprapporter. It was nominated to the Borås Tidnings debutantpris. The book was well received by critics.

She has also written the radio play Härlig är min avgrund which premiered on Sveriges Radio on 16 September 2016. Since March 2020, Schunnesson has been a culture columnist for Aftonbladet. Her 2020 novel Dagarna, dagarna, dagarna was translated to English by Saskia Vogel as Days and days and days and published by Heloise Press in the United Kingdom, in 2023. For Aftonbladet she also hosts the cultural podcast Café Bambino which has featured guests such as former Prime Minister Magdalena Andersson.

== Bibliography ==
- 2016 – Härlig är min avgrund. Stockholm: Sveriges Radio.
- 2016 – Tripprapporter. Stockholm: Norstedt. ISBN 9789113073064
- 2020 – Dagarna, dagarna, dagarna. Stockholm: Norstedts. ISBN 9789113102566
- 2026 – Ultravåld. Stockholm: Norstedts. ISBN 9789113132242
