= Three Summers (novel) =

1946 Greek novel by Margarita Liberaki

Three Summers (Greek: Τα ψάθινα καπέλα) is a Greek novel written by Margarita Liberaki and first published in 1946. In 1995 the novel was translated into English by Karen Van Dyck; it was reissued in 2019 by NYRB Classics.

In 2019 Van Dyck discussed the work she did translating the novel in a blog post for The Paris Review. She noted that the original title translated literally to The Straw Hats which she changed to avoid negative class connotations associated with the term "straw hats" in English.

Three teenage sisters, Maria, Infanta and Katarina, come of age in the countryside near Athens shortly before the outbreak of WWII.

== Summary ==
In Kifisia three teenage sisters Maria, Infanta and Katarina, live on their grandfather's estate with their grandparents, mother and aunt. Their parents are divorced due to their father's infidelities. Maria, who is nineteen, spends the first summer being deliberately flirtatious while ignoring the attentions of Marios, their neighbour who is deeply in love with her. After abruptly losing her virginity to a handsome stranger, Maria decides she wants to marry and agrees to marry Marios.

The second summer Maria gives birth to her first child. Infanta has suitors, but taking after her artistic and ambitious aunt, she feels unable to pursue a sexual relationship with them. Katarina falls in love with one of her neighbours, David, and after a long and protracted summer flirtation they finally kiss in his observatory.

By the third summer Maria is pregnant again, though her marriage to Marios is already rocky as he spends most of his time at work and is uninterested in her domestic life. Infanta is pursued by a friend, Nikitas, but encouraged by her aunt Theresa rejects his advances to focus on her art. Katerina and David renew their affections after he returns from studying abroad.

Katerina learns that David has asked for her hand in marriage and decides to think over his proposal for a week. During this time period she discovers that her mother has secretly been keeping up a correspondence with her mother, a Polish born woman who abandoned her as a child. Katerina feels empathy for her mother and decides to reject David's offer of marriage.

== Criticism ==
NPR called the translation "engaging and provocative."
