= Skeda udde =

- Location within Östergötland Location within Sweden
- Coordinates: 58°17′N 15°34′E
- Country: Sweden
- Province: Östergötland
- County: Östergötland County
- Municipality: Linköping Municipality

Area
  - Total: 0.37 km^{2} (0.14 sq mi)

Population (31 December 2010)
  - Total: 283
  - Density: 772/km^{2} (2,000/sq mi)
- Time zone: UTC+1 (CET)
  - Summer (DST): UTC+2 (CEST)

Skeda udde is a locality situated in Linköping Municipality, Östergötland County, Sweden with 283 inhabitants in 2010.
