= Ida Börjel =

Swedish poet

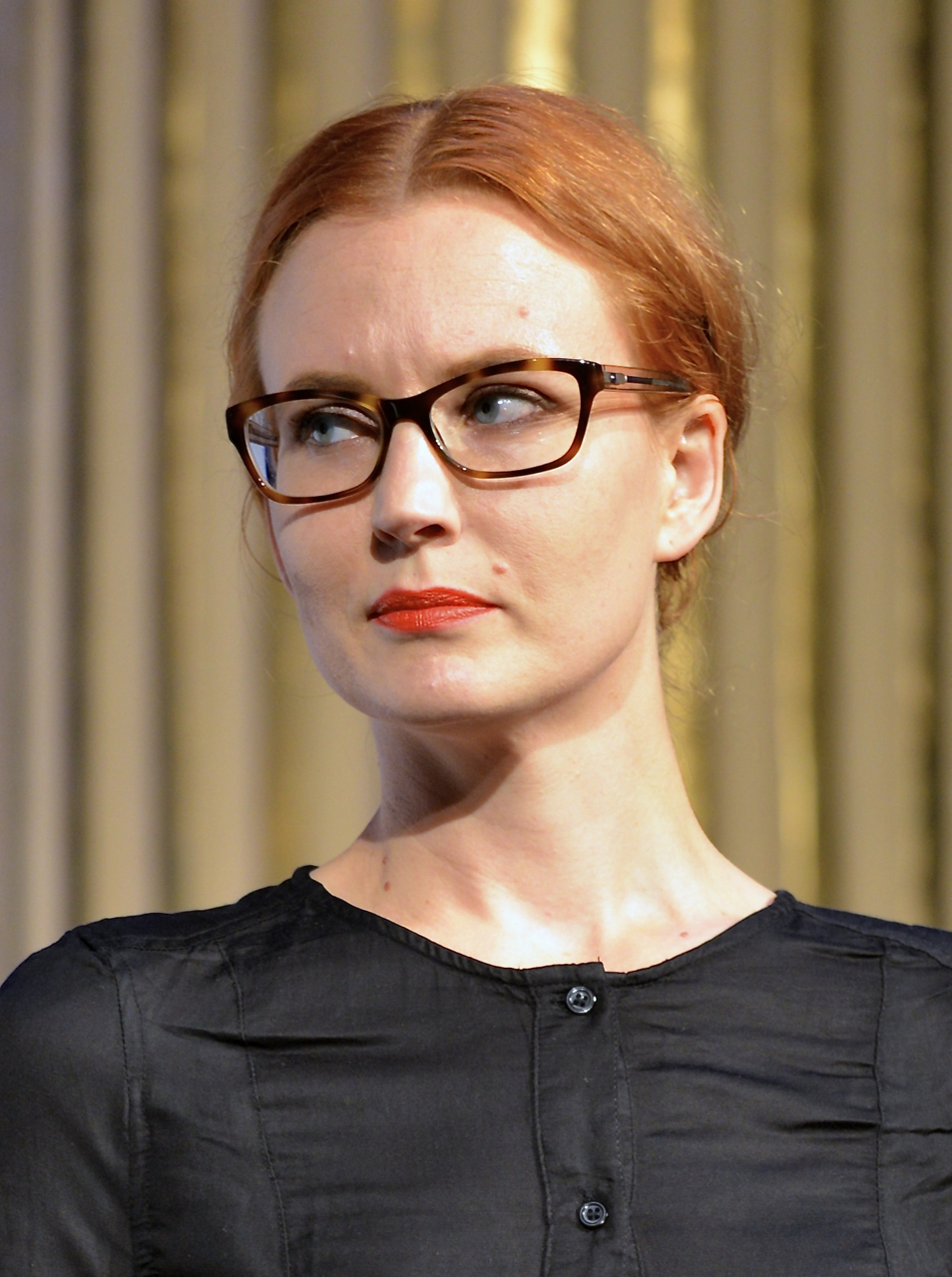
- Ida Börjel in 2014
- Born: 1975 (age 49–50); Lund, Sweden
- Occupation: Poet
- Awards: Borås tidnings debutantpris (2005); Dobloug Prize (2018)

Ida Börjel (born 1975) is a Swedish poet.

Börjel was born in Lund. She made her literary debut in 2004 with the poetry collection Sond, for which she was awarded Borås Tidnings debutantpris in 2005. Further books are Skåneradio from 2006, and Konsumentköplagen from 2008. Her poetry book Ma from 2014 was nominated for the August Prize. She was awarded the Dobloug Prize in 2018.
