= Hiroko Oyamada =

Japanese writer

- 小山田 浩子
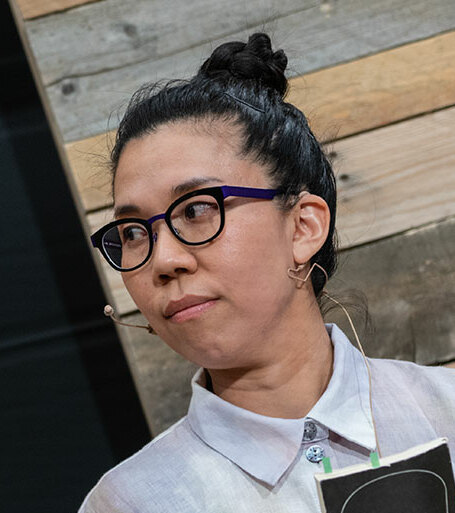
- Oyamada in 2023
- Born: 1983 (age 42–43); Hiroshima, Japan
- Education: Hiroshima University
- Occupation: Writer
- Writing career
- Language: Japanese
- Genres: Fiction, short story
- Notable works: Ana; Kōjō
- Notable awards: Akutagawa Prize; Oda Sakunosuke Prize; Shincho Prize for New Writers

Hiroko Oyamada (小山田 浩子, Oyamada Hiroko; born 1983) is a Japanese writer. She has won the Shincho Prize for New Writers, the Oda Sakunosuke Prize, and the Akutagawa Prize.

== Early life and education ==
Hiroko Oyamada was born in 1983 in Hiroshima and remained there throughout her school years, eventually graduating from Hiroshima University in 2006 with a degree in Japanese literature. After graduation Oyamada changed jobs three times in five years, including her time working for a large factory that manufactured cars; an experience that inspired her debut story Kōjō (The Factory), which received the 42nd Shincho Prize for New Writers in 2010. After her debut Oyamada worked a part-time editorial job at a local magazine, but quit after marrying a co-worker.

== Influences on her works ==
Oyamada's experience with switching jobs and working in a large company manufacturing cars acted as inspiration for her novella Kōjō (Factory). During the creation of one of her other works, Ana (Hole), Oyamada herself had moved to the countryside which is reflective of the main character of the novella. In both Kōjō and Ana, Oyamada "came to a dead end, unable to find her way forward," until she was struck with an idea for each through either a trick of the eye or through a dream, allowing her to finish the novellas.

== Career ==
In 2013 Oyamada won the 30th Oda Sakunosuke Prize for a short story collection containing "Kōjō" as the title story. Later that year Oyamada's novella Ana (Hole), about a woman who falls into a hole, was published in the literary magazine Shinchō. Ana won the 150th Akutagawa Prize. One of the Akutagawa Prize judges, author Hiromi Kawakami, commended Oyamada's ability to write about "fantasy in a reality setting." In 2014 Oyamada received the 5th Hiroshima Cultural Newcomer Award for her cultural contributions. In 2018 Oyamada's third book, a short story collection called Niwa (Garden), was published by Shinchosha.

An English edition of "Kōjō", translated by David Boyd, was published by New Directions Publishing under the title The Factory in 2019. Writing for The Wall Street Journal, Sam Sacks noted that the "tonal blandness" of the writing style matched the feeling of repetitive, meaningless office work. In a starred review of The Factory for Publishers Weekly, Gabe Habash praised Oyamada's ability to make the reader experience the same disorientation as the book's main character, concluding that the book would leave readers "reeling and beguiled".

Oyamada has cited Franz Kafka and Mario Vargas Llosa as literary influences. In his review of Granta's special issue on Japanese literature, James Hadfield of The Japan Times compared Oyamada's writing to that of Yōko Ogawa and said that her work "suggests good things to come from this promising young writer."

Oyamada lives in Hiroshima with her husband and daughter.

== Recognition ==
- 2010: 42nd Shincho Prize for New Writers
- 2013: 30th Oda Sakunosuke Prize
- 2014: 150th Akutagawa Prize (2013下)

== Works ==
=== In Japanese ===
- Kōjō (Factory), Shinchosha, 2013, ISBN 9784103336419
- Ana (Hole), Shinchosha, 2014, ISBN 9784103336426
- Niwa (Garden), Shinchosha, 2018, ISBN 9784103336433
- Kojima (Islet), Shinchosha, 2021, ISBN 9784103336440

=== In English ===
- "Spider Lilies", translated from the Japanese by Juliet Winters Carpenter, in: Granta 127, Spring 2014, ISBN 978-1-905881-77-2
- The Factory, translated from the Japanese by David Boyd (New York: New Directions, 2019), ISBN 978-0-8112-2885-5
- The Hole, translated from the Japanese by David Boyd (New York: New Directions, 2020), ISBN 978-0-8112-2887-9
- Weasels in the Attic, translated from the Japanese by David Boyd (New York: New Directions, 2022), ISBN 978-0-8112-3118-3
- "Flight", translated from the Japanese by David Boyd, in: Monkey New Writings from Japan volume 4, 2023, ISBN 978-4-88418-620-3
