= Dorthe Nors =

Danish writer (born 1970)

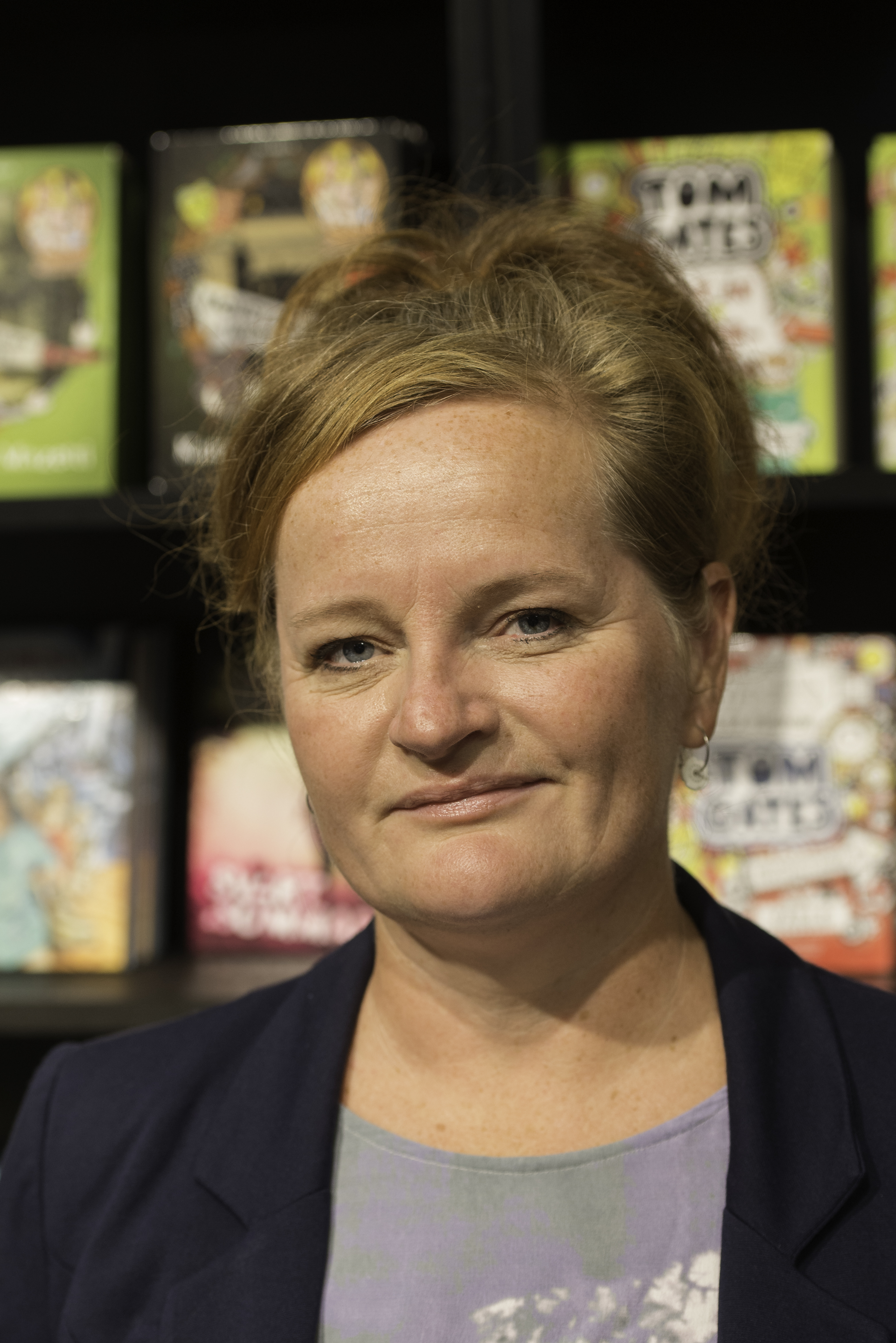
- Nors at the Göteborg Book Fair, 2015
- Born: 20 May 1970 (age 56); Herning, Denmark
- Education: Aarhus University (degree in literature and art history)
- Occupation: Author
- Writing career
- Language: Danish, English
- Years active: 2002–present
- Genre: Literary fiction
- Website: www.dorthenors.dk

Dorthe Nors (born 20 May 1970) is a Danish writer. She is the author of Soul, Karate Chop, Mirror, Shoulder, Signal, and Wild Swims.

== Background ==
Nors was born in Herning, Denmark, the youngest of three children. As a child, she enjoyed making up stories that her mother, a teacher and painter, would write down and read back to her. At the age of eleven, Nors began writing her own stories, poems, and plays.

In 1999, Nors graduated from Aarhus University with a degree in literature and art history.

== Career ==
Before her literary debut in her own right, Nors worked as a translator of Swedish crime novels, mostly books by author Johan Theorin.

She made her debut in 2001, with the book Soul, published by Samlerens Forlag. Her English-language following began in 2009, when selections from her short-story collection Karate Chop were published in English. She became the first Danish writer to have a story published in The New Yorker, when it printed her story "The Heron" in 2013. In 2015, her first short-story collection Karate Chop was published in English alongside So Much for That Winter, a joint publication of her novellas Minna Needs Rehearsal Space and Days. Her second collection of short stories Wild Swims was published in English in 2021 by Graywolf Press.

In 2017, she was nominated for the Man Booker International Prize for her novel Mirror, Shoulder, Signal. Her nonfiction book A Line in the World was a finalist for the 2023 National Book Critics Circle award in autobiography.

== Personal life ==
Nors lived in Copenhagen for several years before moving back to Jutland in 2013. She has written about not feeling she fits in to Copenhagen's literary scene.

== Bibliography ==
=== Nonfiction ===
- A Line in the World: A Year on the North Sea Coast, Graywolf Press (Minneapolis), ISBN 16-444-5209-X

=== Novels ===
- Soul, Samlerens Forlag, 2001, ISBN 87-568-1644-8
- Stormesteren, Samlerens Forlag, 2003, ISBN 87-568-1727-4
- Ann Lie, 2005, ISBN 87-638-0247-3
- Minna mangler et øvelokale, Samlerens Forlag, 2013, ISBN 978-87-638-2705-8

- Minna Needs Rehearsal Space (translated by Misha Hoekstra), Pushkin Press, 2017, ISBN 978-17-8227-434-6

- Spejl, skulder, blink, Gyldendal, 2015, ISBN 978-87-021-8939-1

- Mirror, Shoulder, Signal (translated by Misha Hoekstra), Graywolf Press, 2018, ISBN 978-15-5597-808-2

=== Short fiction ===
Collections

- Hun kommer, Samlerens, Forlag 2007
- Dage, Samlerens Forlag, 2010, ISBN 978-87-638-1428-7
- Kantslag, Samlerens Forlag, 2008, ISBN 978-87-638-0922-1

- Karate Chop (translated by Martin Aitken), Graywolf Press, 2014, ISBN 978-1-55597-665-1

- Kort over Canada, Gyldendal, 2018, ISBN 978-87-022-6256-8

- Wild Swims (translated by Misha Hoekstra), Graywolf Press, 2021, ISBN 978-1-64445-043-7
Stories

| Title | Year | First published | Reprinted/collected | Notes |
|---|---|---|---|---|
| The heron | 2013 | Nors, Dorthe (9 September 2013). "The heron". The New Yorker. | | |
| The freezer chest | 2015 | Nors, Dorthe (25 May 2015). "The freezer chest". The New Yorker. Vol. 91, no. 14. Translated from the Danish by Misha Hockstra. pp. 64–67. | | |
