= Batool Abu Akleen =

Palestinian poet and translator

- بتول أبو عقلين
- Born: 2005 (age 20–21); Gaza City, Gaza Strip
- Occupations: Poet, translator
- Notable work: 48Kg., Voices of Resistance: Diaries of Genocide
- Awards: Barjeel Poetry Prize (2020); 3rd place, London Magazine Poetry Prize (2025)

Batool Abu Akleen (Arabic: بتول أبو عقلين; born c. 2005) is a Palestinian poet and translator from Gaza City, writing in her native Arabic and as translator in English. Her bilingual debut collection, 48Kg., was published in June 2025 by Tenement Press. She was named Modern Poetry in Translation’s "Poet in Residence" in 2024 and has received recognition for both her poetry and translation work. Her poetry has been published both in Arabic as well as in English and Italian translations, and featured in international literary publications.

== Early life and education ==
Batool Abu Akleen began writing poetry at the age of ten, with early encouragement from Heba al-Agha at a creative writing club offered by the A. M. Qattan Foundation. She won her first major poetry award at age fifteen, receiving the Barjeel Poetry Prize in 2020 for her poem "I Didn’t Steal the Cloud" (also translated as “It Wasn’t Me Who Stole the Cloud”). In a September 2024 interview, she talked about her inspirations for writing and said "Poetry is what keeps me alive."

Before the Gaza War, she was studying English literature and translation at the Islamic University of Gaza.

== Career ==
In 2024, Abu Akleen was named Modern Poetry in Translation’s Poet in Residence, a role that involved contributing poetry and translations to the magazine while living in Gaza under the dire conditions of the Gaza war. Her debut poetry collection 48Kg. is a bilingual work (Arabic–English) published in June 2025 by Tenement Press. It comprises 48 poems each numbered in reverse – 48 Kg, 47 Kg, and so on – functioning as a poignant testament to a body under siege and the bodily effects of violence. It is self-translated into English alongside translations by Graham Liddell, Wiam El-Tamami, Cristina Viti, and Yasmin Zaher. A digital pamphlet, Sea Shells, was published in tandem with 48Kg., featuring works by nine emerging Gazan poets selected and translated by Abu Akleen and edited by Cristina Viti.

Four of Abu Akleen's poems were published in English in the 2025 anthology Letters from Gaza: A Collection by the People; Unveiling Their Stories and Emotions from the Year That Has Been. Her poems also appeared in The Massachusetts Review, in ArabLit Quarterly magazine's spring 2024 issue and in an Italian anthology. Further, Abu Akleen is co-author (with Nahil Mohana, Sondos Sabra, and Ala’a Obaid) of Voices of Resistance: Diaries of Genocide, published by Comma Press in 2025. In April 2025, a few days after Palestinian photojournalist Fatima Hassouna was killed, literary magazine ArabLit published Abu Akleen's translation of Fatima Hassouna's collection of poems A Resonant Death.

Abu Akleen maintains a YouTube channel where she shares daily life and writing activities, including her involvement in writing, reading, and translating under siege.

== Awards and recognition ==
- Barjeel Poetry Prize, 2020 – awarded for her poem "I Didn’t Steal the Cloud" at age 15.
- Modern Poetry in Translation’s Poet in Residence, 2024.
- Third place, London Magazine Poetry Prize, 2025 – for her poem “Gunpowder.”

== Selected works ==
- 48Kg. (Tenement Press, June 2025) – bilingual poetry collection
- Sea Shells (Digital pamphlet, 2025) – selected and translated works by emerging Gazan poets
- Voices of Resistance: Diaries of Genocide (Comma Press, 2025) – co-author

=== In anthologies ===
- And still we write = ومازلنا نكتب : recent work by Palestinian poets & actions you can take to stop genocide now (Publishers for Palestine, 2024)
- Letters from Gaza (Penguin Random House 2025)

== Reception ==
Abu Akleen’s work has been described as marked by visceral, intimate imagery that transforms the experience of genocide into personal testimony. In 48Kg., each poem’s title reflects a decremental weight, metaphorically conveying bodily deterioration under siege. The Avery Review described her collection’s spare, skeletal structure—minimal punctuation, abrupt breaks—that evokes the collapse of structure in a siege-ridden life. Commenting on Abu Akleen's act of self-translation, the review wrote:

Through the act of self-translation, Abu Akleen does not simply render her work into another language; she reenters the text, confronting its grief and fear on new terms. The translated poems bear the imprint of this reckoning, each line shaped by a poet who is not only surviving but actively reassembling herself across languages.

— Alaa Alqaisi, In Fragments, in Fire: Four Books from Gaza

Her publisher Tenement Press quoted several reviews of the poems’ intense emotional force, describing them as “devastatingly precise and unforgettable,” and recognizing how they confront war’s physicality with grace, tenderness, and irony.

On 5 September 2025, The Guardian featured Abu Akleen's collection 48Kg. as among the best recent poetry, calling it a "remarkable debut" that "stands out among poetry of witness on the genocide" in Gaza. According to this review, Abu Akleen writes with "uncompromising clarity and tenderness against continuing atrocities." Further reviews have appeared in New Lines Magazine and New Straits Times of Malaysia.

== See also ==
- Palestinian literature
