= Margarita Liberaki =

Greek writer and dramatist

- Μαργαρίτα Λυμπεράκη
- Born: 22 April 1919; Athens, Greece
- Died: May 24, 2001 (aged 82)
- Occupations: writer, dramatist
- Writing career
- Period: 1945–2001

Margarita Liberaki (Greek: Μαργαρίτα Λυμπεράκη, romanized: Margarita Lymberaki; 22 April 1919 – 24 May 2001) was a Greek writer and dramatist.

== Life and career ==
Liberaki was born in Athens, Greece, the daughter of Sappho (née Fexi), a writer, and Themistoklis Lymberakis. Her sister was the sculptor Aglae Liberaki (1923–85). Her parents divorced when she was a child and she was raised by her maternal grandparents. Her grandfather was the important publisher and bookstore owner Georgios D. Fexis. She studied law at the National and Kapodistrian University of Athens. In 1941, she married the lawyer and poet Giorgos Karapanos. After completing her degree in 1943, she wrote and published her first novel The Trees (1945) under her married name. The couple had one daughter, novelist Margarita Karapanou. After their daughter's birth in 1946, they divorced and Liberaki moved to Paris, where she began to write for the theater in French and Greek.

== Works ==
=== Novels ===
- Τα δέντρα (1945). The Trees.
- Τα Ψάθινα Καπέλα [Ta psathina kapela] (1946). The Straw Hats. Translated by Karen Van Dyck as Three Summers (Kedros, 1995; New York Review Books, 2019).
- Ο άλλος Αλέξανδρος [O allos Alexandros] (1950). The Other Alexander, trans. Willis and Helle Tzalopoulou Barnstone (The Noonday Press, 1959).
- Το μυστ́ηριο [To mystērio] (1976). The Mystery or The Rite.

=== Plays ===
- Η γυναίκα του Κανδαύλη [Hē gynaika tou Kandaulē] (1954). Candaules’ Wife.
- L'autre Alexandre (1957). Translated by the author into Greek as Ο άλλος Αλέξανδρος [Ho allos Alexandros] (1971).
- Les Danaïdes (1963). Translated by the author into Greek as Οι Δαναΐδες [Hoi Danaides] (1978)
- Le saint prince (1963). Translated by the author into Greek as Ο άγιος πρίγκηψ [Ho hagios prinkēps] (1972).
- Sparagmos (1967). Translated by the author into Greek as Σπαραγμός: τα πάθη του αστερίου [Sparagmos: ta pathē tou asteriou] (1970).
- Le lit secret (1967). Translated by the author into Greek as Το μυστικό κρεβάτι [To mystikó krebáti] (1972).
  - First published in Mythical Theater (1980).
- Erotica (1974). Translated by the author into Greek as Ερωτικά: τελετή καθαρμού [Erōtika: teletē katharmou] (1983).
  - Later republished as Γυναίκες και άντρες [Gynaikes kai andres] (1997). Women and Men.
- Ζωή [Zōē] (1985).

Screenplays

- Μαγική πόλη (1954). Magic City, directed by Nikos Koundouros.
- Phaedra (1962). Written with and directed by Jules Dassin.

=== Other ===
- Για τον απόντα / Εσπερινή τελετ́η [Gia ton aponta / Esperinī teletē] (1972). For the Absent / Evening Ceremony. Poems.
- Μυθικό θέατρο (1980). Mythical Theater.
  - Compiles Candaules’ Wife, The Danaïds and The Secret Bed.
- Δε μ' αγαπάς. Μ' αγαπάς : τα παράξενα της μητρικής αγάπης (2008). You Do Not Love Me. You Love Me.
  - Letters to her daughter Margarita Karapanou between 1962 and 1974.
