= Sami Said (writer) =

Swedish writer

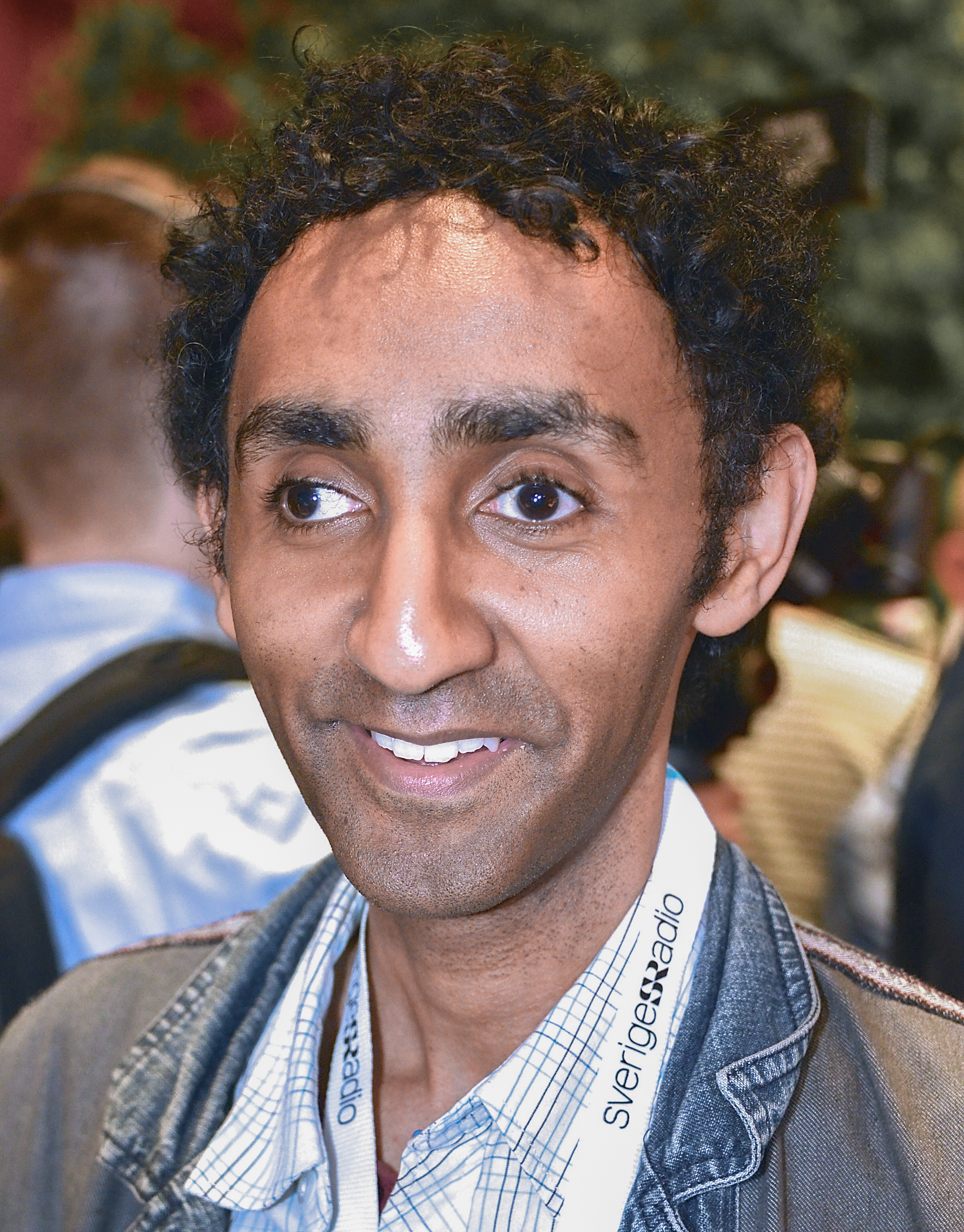
- Sami Said in 2013.
- Born: 1979 (age 46–47); Keren, Eritrea
- Occupation: Novelist
- Writing career
- Language: Swedish
- Notable work: Människan är den vackraste staden (2018)

Sami Said (born 1979) is an Eritrean-born Swedish writer. His novels, which frequently draw from his own immigrant experience, have received critical acclaim in his adopted country. Människan är den vackraste staden, his third novel, was one of Sweden's nominees for the 2019 Nordic Council Literature Prize.

== Early life and education ==
Said was born in Keren, Eritrea, in 1979. When he was a child, his family fled the war in their country, passing through Sudan and then Germany before settling in Gothenburg, Sweden, by the time he was 10 years old.

After high school, he studied at Linköping University, where he founded a literary magazine with fellow writer Oskar Hallbert.

== Career ==
Said became interested in writing at a young age. He began working on manuscripts in earnest during his time at university, but his early submissions were all rejected.

After the publisher Natur & Kultur took interest in his work, his first two books were released in quick succession. His critically acclaimed first novel Väldigt sällan fin, about a university student at Said's own alma mater, was published in 2012. The following year, it won the Katapultpriset, the prize issued by the Swedish Writers' Union for debut authors. It was followed in 2013 by his autobiographical second novel Monomani, which details Said's experience writing Väldigt sällan fin.

His third novel, Människan är den vackraste staden, was published in 2018. Like his first two novels, it was the subject of substantial critical praise, and it was shortlisted for the 2018 August Prize and nominated for the 2019 Nordic Council Literature Prize.

His most recent novel, Satansviskningar ("Whispers of Satan"), was published in 2023 and nominated for the August Prize.

Said's work frequently draws from his own experiences as an Eritrean immigrant to Europe, although he also describes himself as an outsider within his own immigrant community.

He also published a children's book, Äta gräs, in 2019. It was illustrated by the Swedish artist Sven Nordqvist.

== Personal life ==
Sami Said lives in Hägersten, Stockholm, with his wife, the literary critic Martina Lowden.
