= Osebol =

2019 novel by Marit Kapla

- Author: Marit Kapla
- Language: Swedish
- Set in: Osebol, a village in Värmland County
- Published: April 25, 2019
- Publisher: Teg Publishing
- Publication place: Sweden
- Pages: 812
- Awards: August Prize (2019)

Osebol is a 2019 debut novel by Swedish writer Marit Kapla. It won the 2019 August Prize for Fiction.

The book focuses on a village called Osebol in Värmland County. It features a series of interviews with local residents who describe their lives from the past to the present. According to Kapla, the book is not political but rather existential, aiming simply in preserving a document about a village and its inhabitants.

The book was translated to English by Peter Graves and released by Allen Lane in 2021 under the title Osebol: Voices from a Swedish Village.
