= The Factory (novel) =

Novel by Hiroko Oyamada

- First edition (Shinchōsha, 2013)
- Author: Hiroko Oyamada
- Translator: David Boyd
- Language: Japanese
- Genre: Japanese proletarian
- Publisher: Japan: Shinchosha Publishing Co. (Japanese edition); New York City: New Directions Publishing Corporation (English edition)
- Publication date: 2013
- Publication place: Japan
- English publication date: 2019
- Media type: Print (Paperback)
- Pages: 116 p. (English edition)

The Factory (Japanese: 工場, Hepburn: Kōjō) is a proletarian novella written by Japanese author Hiroko Oyamada. Originally written and published in Japan in 2013 by Shinchosha Publishing Co., the book was translated into English by David Boyd and published in 2019 by New Directions Publishing Corporation. The uniquely structured novella switches between the perspectives of three characters as they begin jobs at a joint living and working facility known as "the factory."

== Setting ==
The Factory is set in an unidentified Japanese city. Although the factory is mainly a place of work, employees also live on the grounds surrounding it. The compound is self-sufficient and so large that it could be its own city. It is said to have everything except a graveyard. The factory's compound includes: living quarters, a temple with a priest, museums, restaurants, grocery stores, travel agencies, barbers, post offices, and more. The factory's setting is mysterious. There is a randomly placed bridge over a body of water. The animals in the compound, including Factory Shags, Washer Lizards, and Grayback Coypus, act very differently from normal animals. The people are strange as well, including a disheveled character named the "Forest Pantser" who lives in the dense, maze-like forest surrounding the factory where he pulls people's pants down.

== Plot ==
The Factory follows three new employees as they begin their new lives. The timeline, somewhat indefinite, appears to take place over a fifteen year span.

The story begins with Yoshiko Ushiyama being interviewed by Goto for a job at the factory. She graduated school with a liberal arts degree and a special interest in research on Japanese communication. She feels undeserving of working in such an important place as the factory. She recalls the impression the astounding factory had on her when she visited as a child. It seemed all powerful and like the perfect place to work. At the end of her interview, she is offered a contract position in the Print Services division. She spends full workdays shredding papers. Occasionally, she eats lunch with her work friends or her brother and his girlfriend. Yoshiko's portion of the story ends when she begins questioning her entire life's purpose before becoming a part of the factory herself.

The second perspective is that of Yoshio Furufue. Before he is recruited by the factory to work as a moss specialist, he was a university student. When he attends what he believes to be an interview for the job with Goto, he is told that his university has already coordinated his job and that the purpose of meeting is to start planning. He is given complete control over his project (green-roofing) with no deadlines. He learns that his "department" is just him. Furufue is then told that he will be required to work from a two-story home on the premises, where one story will serve as his lab space. This comes as a surprise to Furufue, who was not told he would be forced to move and live at the factory. To start his work, the factory creates a "moss hunt" that children and parents can sign up for and participate in. After the moss hunt, Hikaru Samukawa and his grandfather approach Furufue at home to present the research they had conducted on the animals that live in the factory. While Furufue is out on a walk studying the mysterious shags, he almost accidentally photographs Yoshiko Ushiyama. Furufue apologizes for the misunderstanding, invites her to lunch, and as they eat together, they briefly compare experiences at the factory. Furufue comes to the realization that he has had no lasting impact on the factory and that his job has been completed without him. His last scene hints at his growing resemblance to the focus of his research.

The final perspective is that of Yoshiko Ushiyama's unnamed brother. He has just landed a temporary proofreading job in the Document Division after being fired from his old job. His previous work experience is in systems engineering. This job is a demotion for him; he sits at a desk all day proofreading nonsensical documents until he falls asleep. He tries to be grateful for his job, but he misses working with computers and feels like he is wasted potential. He spends his time trying his hardest to stay awake with food, coffee, and candy to no avail. He spends his free time with his girlfriend, whom his sister Yoshiko strongly dislikes. His story ends with him waking up and questioning his purpose, exactly how his story begins.

== Characters ==
=== Main characters ===
- Yoshiko Ushiyama regularly changes occupations until she lands a job within the factory shredding paper for seven-and-a-half hours a day. She spends most of her time wondering what her purpose at the factory actually is.
- Yoshio Furufue is an academic who was recruited by the factory from his university to work on the grounds as a moss expert. He shows doubt in his ability to perform the vague tasks asked of him because he is just a student researcher, not a professional bryologist. In the novel, he goes from being a researcher to a corporate scientist. He is given complete freedom over his project with no deadlines and has unlimited resources. He is paid the most out of the three main characters and his status is also the highest in terms of job position in the factory.
- Yoshiko Ushiyama's Unnamed Brother is essentially a proofreader who uses a certain set of codes and symbols to go through a large variety of papers and writings. His job is described as easy enough for a middle-schooler to do and impossible to mess up. It is gossiped that he only gained the job because of his girlfriend's status in relation to the factory.
- Goto is the factory's middle manager and a part of the Print Services Branch Office. He conducts interviews and serves as the go-to person for Yoshiko Ushiyama, Yoshio Furufue, and Yoshiko's brother when they seek advice and instruction.

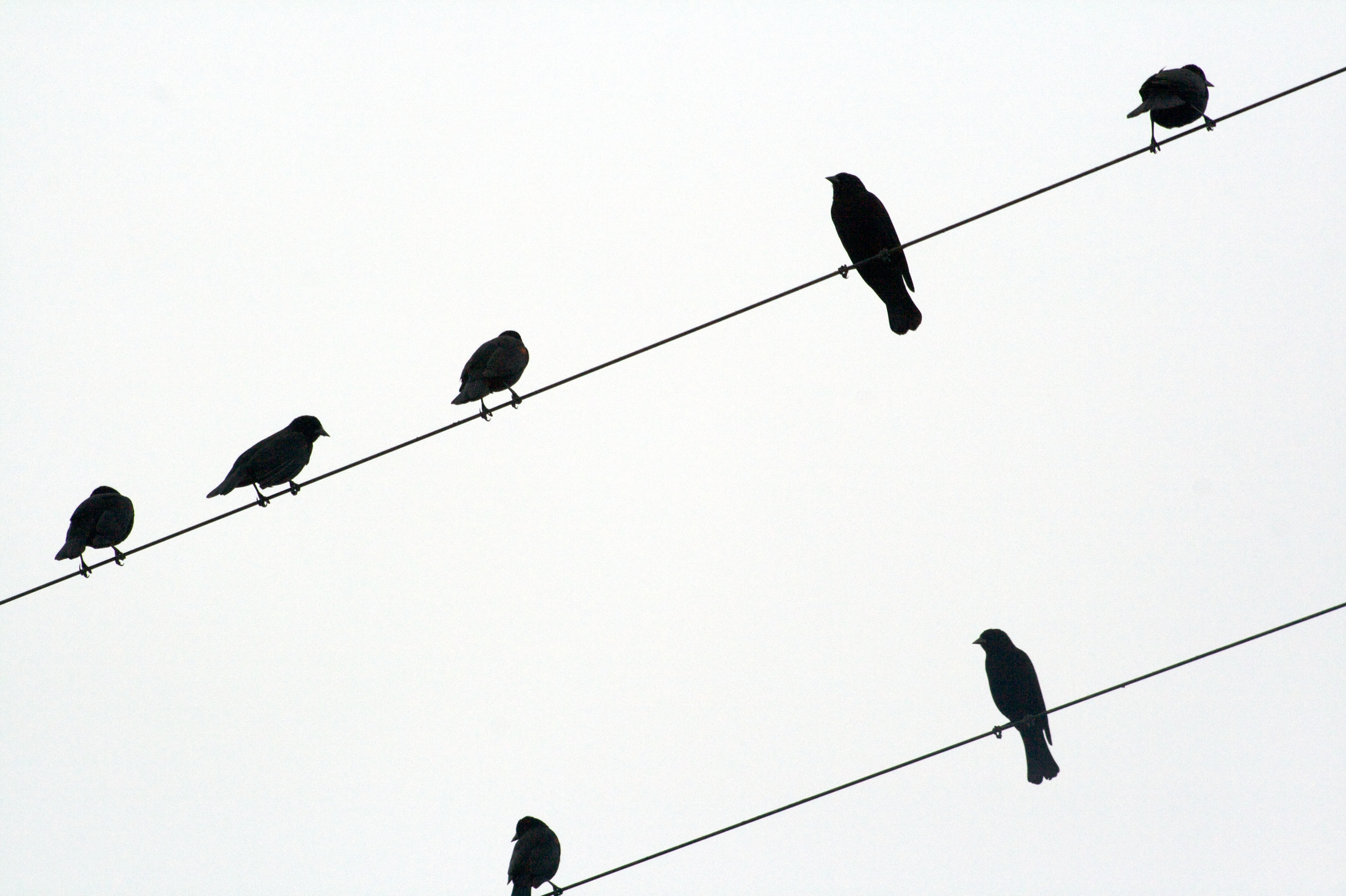
A visual representation of what a cluster of Oyamada's Factory Shags might look like.

=== Secondary characters ===
- Kasumi
- Itsumi-san
- The Giant
- The Captain
- Hanzake
- Irinoi
- Glasses
- Yoshiko Ushiyama's Brother's Girlfriend
- Hikaru Samukawa
- Hikaru Samukawa's Grandfather
- Forest Pantser

=== Factory animals ===
- Factory Shags are large, flightless, and strikingly black birds that thrive in large groups.
- Washer Lizards are small, scaly reptiles that rely on washing machines for survival.
- Grayback Coypus are giant herbivorous rodents.

== Structure ==
Hiroko Oyamada's novella switches between first person perspectives of the three main characters; however, there is no identifying signal for each shift. Without any indicator of who is thinking in each section, it gives the novella a uniformity of consciousness between the main characters. The perspectives become more interwoven the further one reads, sometimes switching perspectives mid-section and losing sequential order. The concept of time disappears entirely, and at the end, the reader finds out fifteen years have passed without their knowing. This endless confusion strengthens the feeling of powerlessness, recreating within the reader the mindless disconnect the factory workers experience. As the novel progresses, the characters transition from a mild confusion to a self-aware acceptance and then to despair. Yoshiko comes to the realization that she actually does not want to work, that life means much more.

== Themes ==
=== Japanese proletarian literature ===
The author of the novel, Hiroko Oyamada, was once a temporary worker within an automaker's subsidiary. Her experiences inspired the themes within this novel. The Factory criticizes the modern capitalist work environment by indicating the powerlessness of the working class. The vague and suffocating daily routines of the working class reflect the structure of this society and its class division. Proletariat literature's tradition highlights the position of the working class and their importance to the machine of capitalism. This genre often sides with Marxist theories which believe the working class is fundamental to the operation of society. This literature can increase tension between the proletariat (the wage workers) and the bourgeoisie (the wealth owners).

In The Factory, the factory workers represent the proletariat as they perform meaningless tasks at wage working jobs. They are not sure what their contributions to the factory are in terms of production and do not see the specific products of their labor.

=== Kafkaesque ===
The novels of Franz Kafka, the Czech writer known for his fictional worlds which are oppressive and sometimes nightmarish, are recalled in Oyamada's storytelling. The Factory has been written in a style similar to that of Kafka, and thus it is labeled "kafkaesque." The novel's strange imagery and nonlinear writing structure invoke the imagination like Kafka's works do. This can leave readers feeling uneasy or confused by what they have read. The story shifts point of view in very subtle ways and the descriptions of characters and events suddenly take a heavy and dark tone. In this way, the novel leads people to compare the story's reality to their own. Kafka's works have the same effect on the readers.

== Reception ==
Hiroko Oyamada has received awards and positive feedback for The Factory. She was awarded the Shincho Prize for New Writers and the novel won the Sakunosuke Oda prize in 2013. The London Magazine acknowledges the way Oyamada depicts her world's workplace environment and positively compares it to other contemporary works. Publishers Weekly praises the capturing of the characters' roles, the way Oyamada skillfully structures the novel, and how the intentionally confusing experience of the characters becomes contagious to the reader. The Kirkus Reviews commends Oyamada's ability to accurately represent Japan's monotonous and unusual vibe and points out the Kafkaesque and proletariat undertones. The New York Times recognizes Oyamada's charisma and her deliberate non-linear structuring and also compliments the translator's smooth translation from Japanese to English.
