= Soong Ching-ling Children's Literature Prize =

Chinese lit. prize

The Soong Ching-ling Children's Literature Prize 宋庆龄儿童文学奖 (pinyin: Song Qingling ertong wenxue jiang) is a prize for children's literature in China. It is sponsored by the Soong Ching-ling Foundation, and is awarded every two years, with a different genre specified each time. It is one of the four main prizes for children's literature in China (the other three are the Bing Xin Children's Literature Award, the Chen Bochui Children's Literature Award, and the National Outstanding Children's Literature Award).

== History ==
The prize is named after Soong Ching-ling. It was established in June 1986 with the aim of recognising writers who have made an outstanding contribution to children's literature, and of promoting the creation of children's literature in China. It was established with the support of writers Ba Jin, Xie Bingxin, and the Ministry of Broadcast, Film and Television, Ministry of Culture and the State Education Commission. The first prizes were awarded in 1988. In 2005 the prize was absorbed into the National Outstanding Children's Literature Award (administered by the China Writers Association).

== 1st Awards (1988) ==
The genre was TV drama scripts (剧本). The translated titles are approximate.
First prize (not awarded)
Second Prize

- 楚雪、战楠:《寻找回来的世界》 - Chu Xue and Zhan Nan, The World that has been Found Back
- 戚君: 《一群小好汉》 - Qi Jun, A Group of Small Heroes

Third Prize

- 诸葛怡: 《好爸爸、坏爸爸》 - Zhuge Yi, Good Dad, Bad Dad
- 张弘: 《心灵的答卷》 - Zhang Hong, Response of the Souls
- 孙卓、郑凯南、易介南: 《彗星》 - Sun Zhuo, Zheng Kenan, Yi Jienan, Comet

== 2nd Awards (1990) ==
The genre was popular science books and science fiction （科幻）. The translated titles are approximate.
First prize (not awarded)
Second Prize

- 郑文光: 《神翼》 - Zheng Wenguang, Magic Wings
- 叶至善、叶三午、叶小沫: 《梦魇》 - Ye Qishan, Ye Sanwu, Ye Xiaomo, Nightmare
- 潘文石: 《大熊猫的故事》 - Pan Wenshi, The Story of the Giant Panda

Third Prize

- 树敬、树逊: 《乔装打扮的土狼》 - Shu Jing, Shu Sun, The Wolf in Disguise
- 肖建亨: 《肖建亨获奖科学幻想小说选》 - Xiao Jianheng, Collection of Prize Winning Science Fiction by Xiao Jianheng
- 李毓佩 《数学司令》 - Li Yupei, Commander of Mathematics
- 严慧: 《少年李四光》 - Yan Hui, Li Siguang in his Youth
- 张之路: 《带电的贝贝》 - Zhang Zhilu, Electrified Baby

== 3rd Awards (1992) ==
The genre was novels （小说）. The translated titles are approximate.
First Prize

- 曹文轩: 《山羊不吃天堂草》- Cao Wenxuan, Goats do not eat paradise grass

Second Prize

- 李潼: 《少年噶玛兰》 - Li Tong (Chinese children's author), The Young Kavalan
- 张之路: 《第三军团》 - Zhang Zhilu, Third Corps
- 程玮: 《少女的红发卡》 - Cheng Wei (Chinese children's author), Girl's Red Card

Third Prize

- 杨啸: 《鹰的传奇》 - Yang Xiao, The Legend of the Eagle
- 刘建屏: 《今年你七岁》 - Liu Jianping, This year you are seven years old
- 李杨杨: 《太阳梦见我》 - Li Yangyang, The Sun Dreamed of Me
- 张微: 《雾锁桃李》 - Zhang Wei, Fog Lock Peach Plum
- 罗辰生: 《天才、神才、鬼才》 - Luo Chensheng, Genius, Talent, Magic

== 4th Awards ==
The genre was tales for young children（童话）. The translated titles are approximate.
First Prize

- 孙幼军: 《怪老头》 - Sun Youjun, Strange old man

Second Prize

- 吴梦起: 《吴梦起童话选》 - Wu Mengqi, Selection of Wu Mengqi's Fairytales
- 郑渊洁: 《郑渊洁童话选》 - Zheng Yuanjie, Selection of Zheng Yuanjie's Fairytales
- 冰波: 《狼蝙蝠》 - Bing Bo, Wolf Bat

Third Prize

- 金波: 《小树叶童话》 - Jin Bo, Little Leaf Fairy Tale
- 周锐: 《向明星进攻》 - Zhou Rui, Attack on the Stars
- 郑允钦: 《怪孩子树米》 - Zheng Yunqin, Strange child tree meters
- 王家珍: 《孩子王老虎》 - Wang Jiazhen, Tiger, King of the Children
- 张秋生: 《新编小巴掌童话百篇》 - Zhang Qiusheng, New collection of 100 palm-sized fairy tales

== 5th Awards (2001) ==
Awarded to books published between 1 January 1999 and 31 December 2001. The translated titles are approximate.
Prize for novel (小说)

- 曹文轩: 《草房子》 - Cao Wenxuan, Grass House

Prize for tales for young children (童话)

- 班马: 《绿人》 - Ban Ma, Green Man

Prize for stories for very young children (幼儿文学)

- 葛冰: 《梅花鹿的角树》 - Ge Bing, The Plum Blossom Deer

Honorable Mentions
Novels

- 沈石溪:《混血豺王》- Shen Shixi, Mixed-blood Jackal-king
- 黄蓓佳:《我要做好孩子》- Huang Beijia, I Want to be Good
- 秦文君:《男生贾里全传》- Qin Wenjun, The Complete Story of Schoolboy Jia Li

Fairy Stories

- 汤素兰:《笨狼的故事》- Tang Sulan, Story of the Stupid Wolf
- 孙幼军:《唏哩呼噜历险记》- Sun Youjun, The Adventures of Xili Hulu
- 周锐:《周锐童话选》- Zhou Rui, Selected Children's Stories

Science Art

- 牧铃:《梦幻牧场》- Mu Ling, Dream Pasture
- 星河:《星际勇士》- Xing He, Warrior of the Stars
- 马铭:《幽灵海湾》- Ma Ming, Dark Bay

Very Young Readers

- 金波:《白城堡》- Jin Bo, White Castle
- 谢华:《星星信》- Xie Hua, Xing xing xin
- 林焕彰（台湾）:《三百个小朋友》- Lin Huanzhang (Taiwan), 300 Little Friends

== 6th Awards (2003) ==
Awards were made to 19 books. The translated titles are approximate.
Prize-winners (3)

- 彭学军: 《你是我的妹》 - Peng Xuejun, You Are My Baby Sister - novel
- 常星儿: 《吹口琴的小野兔阿洛兹》 - Chang Xing'er, Aluozi, little wild rabbit that plays the mouth organ- Tales for young children
- 张之路: 《非法智慧》 Zhang Zhilu, Unlawful Wisdom - science fiction

Good Book Award winners (16)

- 秦文君: 《天棠街3号》 - Qin Wenjun, No 3, Tiantang Street - novel
- 郑春华: 《大头儿子小头爸爸》 - Zheng Chunhua, Big Head Son, Little Head Dad
- 常新港: 《男孩无羁，女孩不哭》 - Chang Xingang - Boys aren't shy, girls don't cry
- 曹文轩: 《根鸟》- Cao Wenxuan, Root Bird - novel
- 萧袤: 《电脑大盗变形记》 - Xiao Mao, Metamorphosis of Computer Thief
- 张秋生: 《骑在扫帚上听歌的巫婆》 - Zhang Qiusheng, Witch on a Broomstick Listening to a Song
- 汤素兰: 《小朵朵和超级保姆》 - Tang Sulan, Little Duoduo and Super Nanny
- 王宜振: 《笛王的故事》 - Wang Yizhen, The Story of the Flute King
- 钟代华: 《让我们远行》 - Zhong Daihua, Let's Travel
- 刘先平: 《大自然探险系列》 - Liu Xianping, Nature Adventure Series
- 谷应: 《中国孩子的梦》 - Gu Ying, Chinese Children's Dreams
- 金波: 《感谢往事》 - Jin Bo (Chinese children's writer), Thanks for the Past
- 桂文亚: 《哈玛！哈玛！伊斯坦堡！》 - Gui Wenya, Hama! Hama! Istanbul!
- 位梦华: 《南极探险·北极探险》 - Wei Menghua, Expedition to the South Pole, Expedition to the North Pole
- 吴然: 《天使的花房》 - Wu Ran, Angel's Flower Room
- 林芳萍: 《走进弟弟山》 - Lin Fangping, Walking into Brother Mountain
