= Children's literature in China =

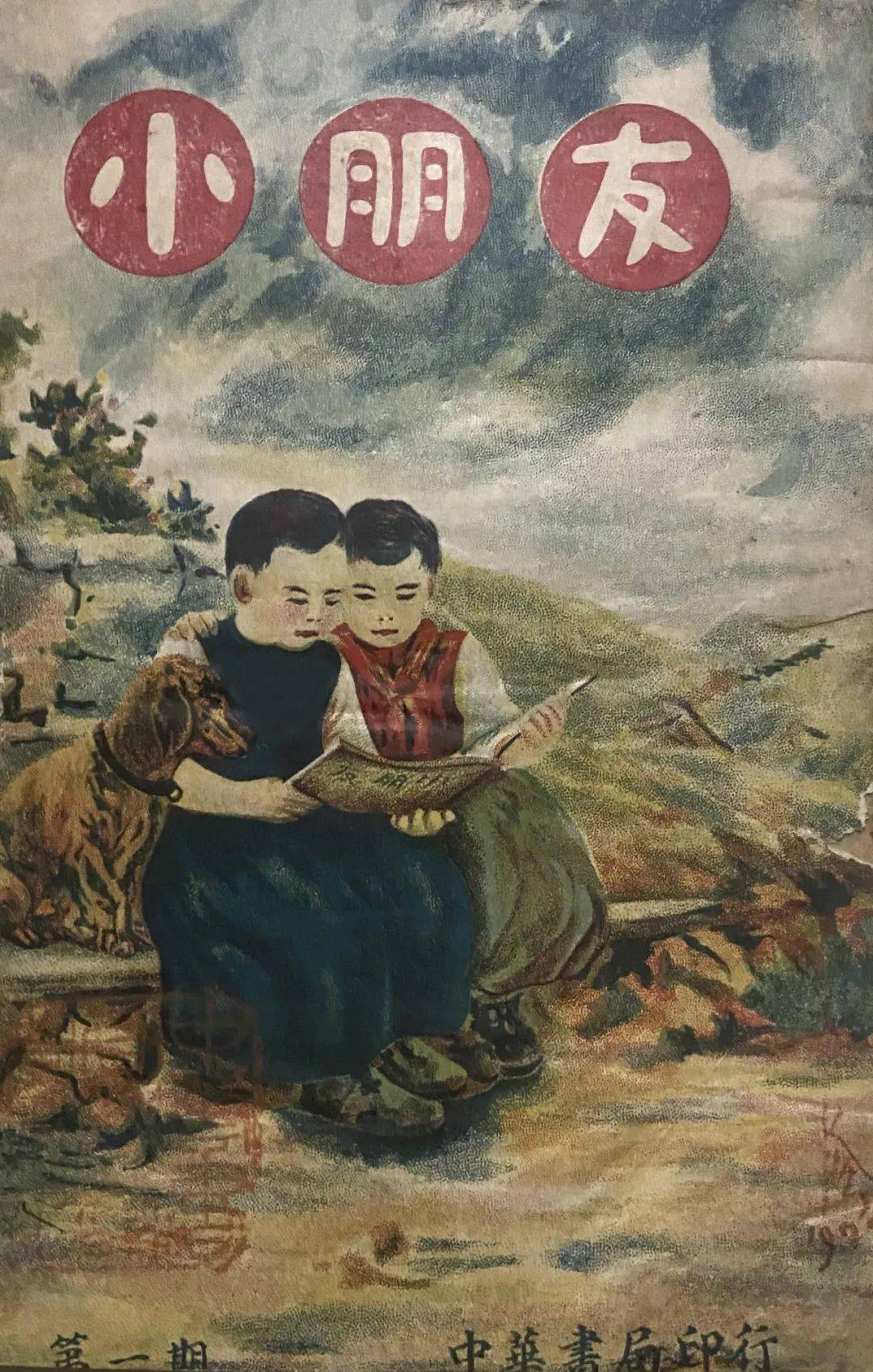
Cover of the first issue of the children's magazine Little Friend (小朋友; Xiǎopéngyǒu), 1922

Children's literature in China emerged as a distinct genre in the early 20th century. Before this, children read educational works and reading primers alongside literature intended for adults. Primers were intended to both teach Chinese characters and instill values such as proper etiquette and filial piety. Picture books were introduced during the 15th century, and became popular as a way for children in middle-class families to learn basic literacy.

Children's periodicals emerged at the beginning of the 20th century, and western children's books began to be translated into Chinese. Following the fall of the Qing dynasty, the New Culture Movement, and the increased use of vernacular Chinese as a written language, more authors began to produce stories aimed at children. The children's literature market became lucrative to the emerging Chinese publishing industry, with various major presses publishing large volumes of children's books and periodicals in the 1920s and 1930s. Radical children's literature, which sought to teach children left-wing political ideals and class consciousness, became popular as the Chinese Communist Party grew during this time. Such literature gained further popularity following the establishment of the People's Republic in 1949, albeit secondary to film. A surge in children's literature publishing took place in the 50s, before declining during the Cultural Revolution.Children's literature began again to grow in popularity during the liberalization of the 1980s and 1990s. This period saw some publications reincorporating Confucian values, while others authors have challenged patriarchal authority in their works and emphasized children's self-assertion.

Many children's books are adaptations of classic novels and folk tales, with simplified language so as to remain accessible to younger readers. Since the 2000s, works have increasingly explored issues children face in modern China and their effect on families. Academic study of children's literature and literary awards celebrating children's works are well-established in China.

== History ==
=== Traditional children's readings ===
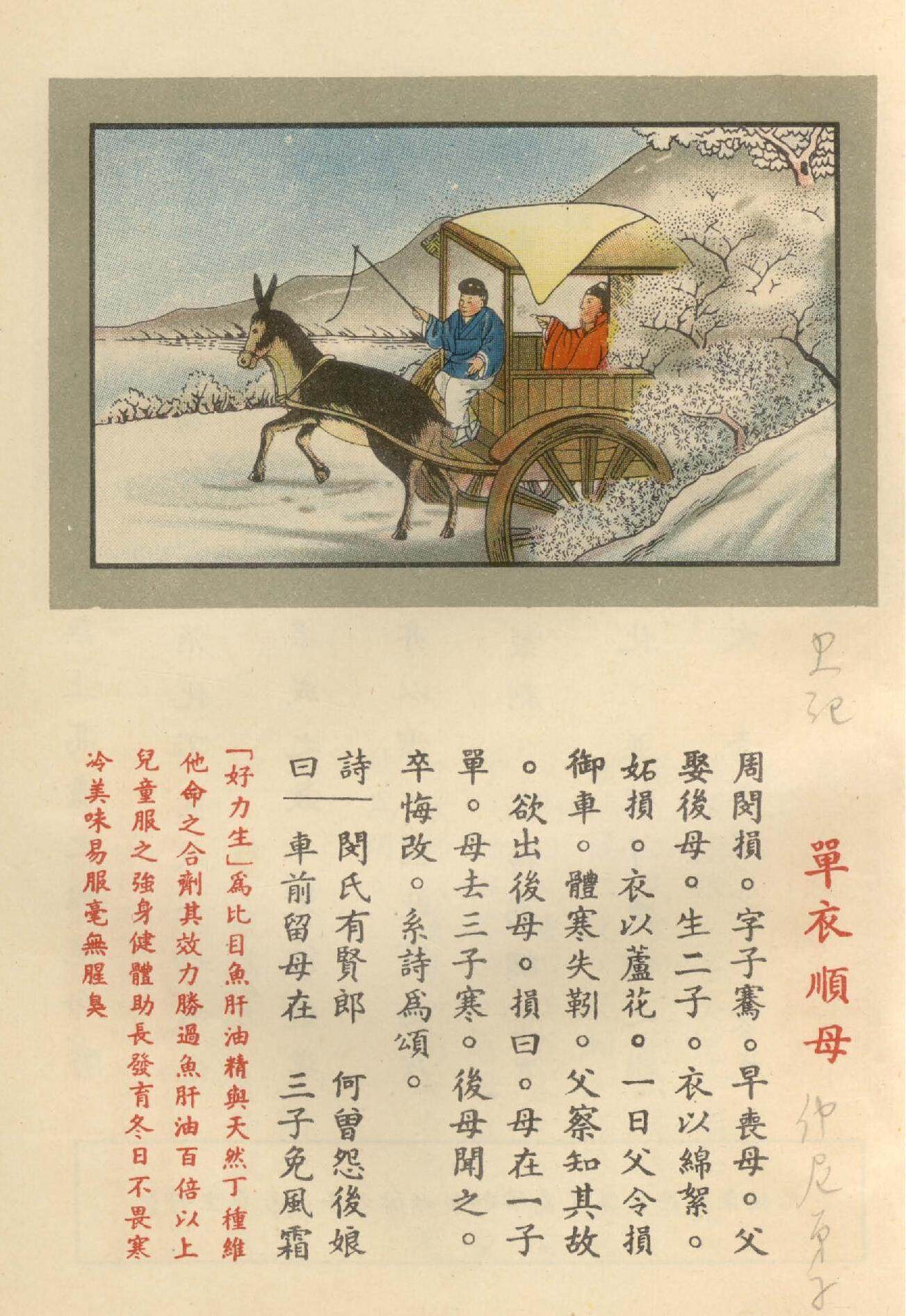
Confucian texts such as the Twenty-four Filial Exemplars were used for instruction in China before the emergence of distinct children's literature.

Although children were exposed to folklore and the oral tradition from an early age, no distinct genre of children's literature existed in China before the modern era. Reading materials for children in Imperial China were generally primers meant to instill values such as filial piety. The Three Character Classic, Hundred Family Surnames, and Thousand Character Classic were used to teach a vocabulary of around 2000 characters. Moral primers, focused on etiquette and Confucian virtues, included The Twenty-four Filial Exemplars and adaptations of the Book of Rites. However, as childhood was not understood as a finite period of time, reading of these materials continued into adulthood. Beyond educational works, children often read literature intended for adults.

The Xinbian Duixiang Siyan (新编對象四言; 'Newly Revised Reader with Four Characters to the Line and Pictures to Match'), published in 1436, was the first children's picture book in China. Picture books gained popularity as a way to introduce young children to reading. Children from middle-class families, not needing the formal training required for the imperial examinations, may have learned only from illustrated primers in order to gain basic literacy. At around six or seven, boys began to study the Four Books and Five Classics. Archaic and difficult to understand for children, they were often memorized before their meanings were fully understood. Educational materials for girls were mainly conduct guides focused around preparing them for marriage, such as the Women's Precepts and the Classic for Girls. These works heavily emphasized women's submission to their husbands along Confucian ideals.

=== Early translations ===
Foreign works of children's literature began to be translated into Chinese in the late Qing dynasty, with early publications including the fairy tales of Hans Christian Andersen, the books of Lewis Carroll, and J.M. Barrie's novel Peter Pan. Around 120 translated children's works were published in China between 1898 and 1919. Lin Shu, a prolific translator of Western literature (despite lacking fluency in any fluent language), produced a large number of translated children's works, including the first Chinese translation of Aesop's Fables in 1902. Sun Yuxiu translated 48 Western children's stories in his Tong Hua series, a compilation of adapted classical Chinese and western tales. Prior to the New Culture Movement, works were often translated into Classical Chinese instead of Standard Chinese, rendering them inaccessible to many children. These translations were generally published in Shanghai, variously included within magazines and books.

The initial wave of translations were followed by localized adaptations, with Shen Congwen and Chen Bochui continuing Alice's Adventures in Wonderland and Lao She publishing a 1940 book derived from Carlo Collodi's The Adventures of Pinocchio (1883). Liang Qichao and Lu Xun both translated works by Jules Verne for young Chinese readers, collectively highlighting the importance of science in modernization.

=== Emergence of children's literature ===
Children's books emerged as a distinct domestic genre in the 1920s. Previously, amidst the turbulence of the late Qing dynasty, few children had had the luxury of reading, and the use of Classical Chinese further impeded them. Following the May 4th Movement, several writers began to prepare stories for children. Challenging the long-established system of Confucian beliefs, these authors were facilitated by the Republic of China government's policy of using vernacular Chinese as a language of instruction, which had been implemented in the 1910s. Accompanying this writing of children's literature were changing mores that recognized the agency of children, the idea of using age as a measure of development, and the implementation of student-centered learning. (Note: John Dewey spent two years in China, from 1919 through 1921, spreading his ideas of student-centred learning. He spoke in English, with his remarks translated by Hu Shih; Xu (2013c, p. 225) argues that Hu used his position as interpreter to simultaneously modify Dewey's concepts, which were subsequently adopted and expanded by contemporary Chinese writers.)

Early proponents of children's literature in China included the prominent new culture novelist Lu Xun. Although Lu did not write for children, he frequently advocated for it, and translated a number of western children's books into Chinese. In 1919, Lu advocated in the literary magazine New Youth for writers to create a distinct children's literature. He was joined in this call the following year by his brother Zhou Zuoren. The two wrote that there existed a sharp divide between adults and the persecuted children, for whom adults needed to make a better future.

In 1923, Ye Shengtao published The Scarecrow, a compilation of fairy tales. Some scholars, including Lu, described The Scarecrow as the first major work of Chinese children's literature; others argued that Ye had co-opted the fairy-tale format as a form of critique against Chinese society more broadly, instead attributing the title of first children's book to Bing Xin's Letters to Young Readers, a collection of letters penned between 1923 and 1926 while she was studying in the United States. Letters to Young Readers became one of the most popular children's works in China during the 1920s; initially published as a newspaper supplement, it was republished as a book in 1926, and saw twenty-one different editions and republications over the following decade.

Magazines for children emerged in the early 1900s, including Educational Pictures for Children (1908–1925) and Fairy Tales (1909–1932). Children's World (published by the Commercial Press) and Little Friend (published by the Zhonghua Book Company) became the most prominent of these children's journals, each seeing biweekly circulations of over 20,000 copies. The Chinese publishing industry became highly dependent on the lucrative children's literature market. Publishers such as the Beixin Book Company, Kaiming Press, and Xiandai Shuju all published large volumes of children's books. Beixin and Xiandai launched their own children's magazines — Little Student and Modern Child respectively — in an attempt to compete with periodicals such as Children's World. Shanghai, the center of the Chinese literary community during the Republican era, also became the center of children's literature and publishing.

==== Debates over purpose ====
During the Republican period (1912–1949), theorists of the emerging children's literature argued what role children's literature had should have and on what themes the works should focus. Some theorists argued that the literature should focus on supplying happiness and curiosity to children, writing that children were unable to understand the sadness and emotional pain of the adult world. However, many early books (including The Scarecrow) were focused on themes of grief and empathy.

Zhou's 1920 essay "A Children's Literature", initially delivered as a lecture to elementary school educators, provided a systematic theory of childhood and children's literature, identifying five distinct stages of childhood development. (Note: Infancy (0–3 years old), early childhood (3–6), later childhood (6–10), adolescence (10–15), and youth (15–20). Such a classification remains in use in modern China.) He argued that children's literature should avoid both moral didactics and politics, instead encouraging fairy tales. Despite advocacy from figures such as Zhou, children's literature became highly politicized by the 1930s. The Commercial Press editor Bi Yun, published an attack on children's fables and fairy tales in the Eastern Miscellany in 1935, writing that children needed "content that exposes the ugliness and cruelty of the beautiful kingdoms and handsome princes in the fairy tales".

In 1931, the Hunan governor He Jian wrote to the Ministry of Education, urging them to ban fables from schools, prompting widespread debate on the format. Proponents of the stories described narratives including anthropomorphized animals as harmless encouragement to children's imaginations, while opponents argued that such narratives impaired children's ability to grasp reality. Although popular opinion largely supported the stories, they were banned from schools in 1932.

==== Wartime ====
Radical children's literature emerged in China soon after the Chinese Communist Party in 1921, although this was a minor current in comparison to other forms during the period. Little Children's Weekly, a communist-affiliated children's magazine, was briefly published from 1926 to 1927, before it was pushed underground by the Kuomintang repression of the Communists during the Chinese Civil War. The genre declined during this period of repression, with authors often writing under pen names and avoiding political content in their stories in favor of fairy tales and fables. This situation began to reverse in 1936, particularly after the formation of the Second United Front at the end of the year. Zhang Tianyi's 1936 Big Lin and Little Lin, one of the most famed Chinese children's books of the 1930s, draws heavily from communist ideals, portraying the struggle between an elite ogre versus Little Lin, a worker.

Through the later parts of the decade, leftist children's magazines touched on international affairs as well as domestic concerns regarding the Second Sino-Japanese War and the Empire of Japan's imperial ambitions. The writer Mao Dun translated numerous works of western children's literature into Chinese. Further contributions to children's literature came from a range of prominent poets and novelists, including Ba Jin, Chen Bochui, and Guo Moruo. During the 1940s, Yan Wenjing and Zhang Tianyi emerged as the preeminent children's authors, although both also wrote for adults. Unlike earlier authors such as Ye and Bing, who tended towards more somber works, Yan and Zhang wrote hopeful, optimistic books which greatly appealed to children. Most of the children's literature in this era was intended for readers over the age of eleven.

Early literary production was centered in Shanghai, but in the late 1930s, as Japan gained increased control over coastal China, activities moved to Chongqing and Yan'an; production also slowed as major publishers and publications were closed. Works published in this time, which included such anti-Japanese titles as Su Su's The Little Traitor and Lao Xiang's Three Character Classic of the Anti-Japanese War, tended to have low readership. Songs were more common, with tunes by Peng Pai and Qu Qiubai adapted for the wartime effort. During the second phase of the Chinese Civil War, the majority of children's writers supported the Chinese Communist Party (CCP), putting on plays and producing stories that satirized the Kuomintang.

=== Early Communist era ===
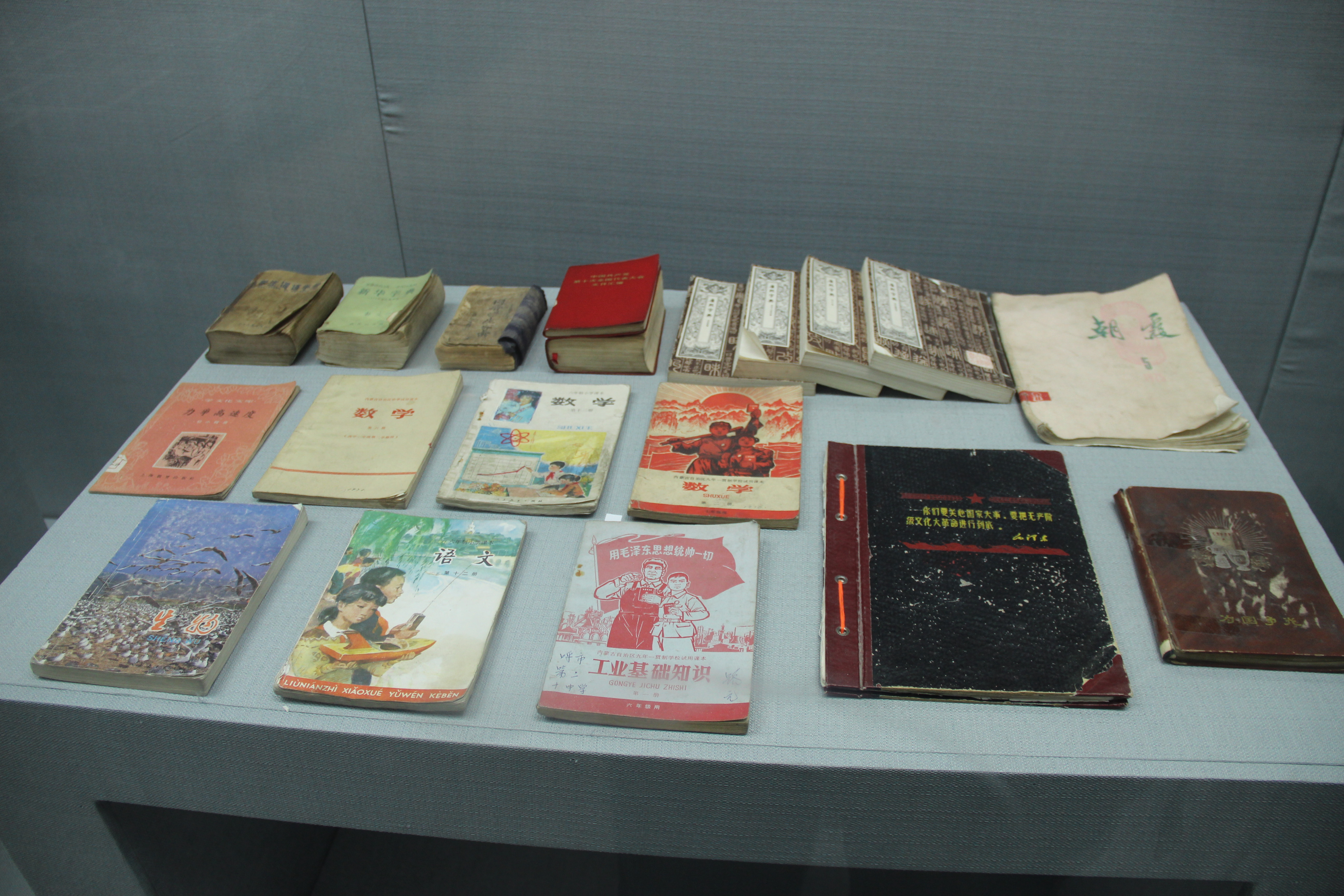
Cultural Revolution-era schoolbooks, Inner Mongolia Museum

With the establishment of the People's Republic of China in 1949, the CCP called for the production of literary works dedicated to children; (Note: Party leader Mao Zedong had promoted a communist children's literature since 1938, urging writers "to make Marxism concretely Chinese [and] to ensure that its every expression manifests Chinese characteristics" .) Such works would advance the idea that children were the heirs to the proletarian revolution, "revolutionary successors" and "new generations of socialism" that could be trained to further improve Chinese society. Contemporary thinkers also highlighted the importance of children's literature in shaping the new socialist society, with Li Bokang deeming it "inseparable from that of literature for adults, only playing a more important and special role in the initial stage of the whole process of education". Thinkers such as Du Gao called for authors to promote class consciousness, with the aim of children seeing themselves proletarians. Many works were intended to help children imagine a better future and memorialize the spirit of the Chinese Communist Revolution.

Though cinema was used as the primary means of communicating socialist ideals, (Note: Xu (2013a, p. 74) highlights several films featuring children as part of the CCP's nation-building practice, including Shi Hui's The Letter with Feathers (1954) and Li Su's Red Children (1958). The Letter with Feathers was adapted from a 1940s novel by Hua Shan.) works of children's literature were issued by several state-owned publishers – including the Shanghai-based Adolescents and Children's Publishing House. After 1955, the production of children's literature increased rapidly; by the end of the 1950s, more than 14,000 titles had been published. There were over 300 active children's writers during the 1950s.

Works from this period extensively used symbols of a new era – spring, dawn, and the rising sun. Various different genres and formats were in circulation, from fairy tales and nursery rhymes to novels, poems, and even news reports. Prominent works from the early Communist period include Zhang Tianyi's 1952 The Story of Luo Wenying, Hong Xuntao's 1955 Ma Liang and His Magic Brush, Ma Feng's 1955 Han Meimei, Gao Xiangzhen's 1960 Xiao Pang and Xiao Song and Xu Guangyao's 1962 Little Soldier Zhang Ga. Works from the period were typically story-focused and centered around a strong hero or heroine; as such, some were enjoyed by adult readers. The Anti-Rightist Campaign, began in 1957, saw a campaign against "reactionary humanism", the concept of childhood innocence and criticism of works which proclaimed a universal human nature. Many children's authors and works were criticized during this period.

==== Cultural Revolution ====
This surge had ended by the mid-1960s. Works published in this decade included He Yi's Liu Wenxue (1965), based on the life of a teenager who was killed by a landlord whom he caught stealing. When the Cultural Revolution commenced in 1966, fewer still works were produced. Children were positioned as part of the Little Red Guards, seen as the vanguards for the ongoing revolution.

=== Modern era ===
The Cultural Revolution lasted through 1976, at which point the production of children's literature had slowed to 200 titles per year. Seeking to improve the situation, more than two hundred educators, publishers, and writers held the Lu Shan Conference in 1978 to discuss potential solutions. They produced three recommendations: promote innovative and imaginative writing, highlight matters of ethics and aesthetics, and allow for greater influence from foreign works. At the same time, the government encouraged the idea that modernization did not necessarily require westernization, and that literary works could be used to shape the Chinese national character in the future.

Such a liberalization of literary policies allowed for the publication of stories critical of the Cultural Revolution, with Liu Xinwu's 1977 short story "The Class Teacher" being considered a milestone in post-Mao children's literature. The production of children's literature increased through the 1980s; by 1984, there were 23 active children's publishers and total sales of children's literature reached 907,540,000. Works such as the anthology Stories for 365 Nights sold several million copies. Publications for children included not only books, but also widely circulated newspapers and magazines; the circulation of the China Youth Daily peaked at 11,000,000 in 1983, but was displaced by local youth newspapers in the following years.

In the 1990s, the Chinese government began to exert greater influence on literature. Amidst a broader movement towards reincorporating Confucian values, it issued the New Three Character Classic in 1994; ten years later, it issued a list of three hundred films, songs, and books recommended for children's consumption. Meanwhile, several writers – including Yu Hua, through his debut novel Cries in the Drizzle (1993) – have challenged patriarchal authority through depictions of nefarious fathers and self-asserting children. Scholarship on children's literature in China expanded significantly in the 1990s. Theorists have rejected the idea that children's literature should be used merely for education and political purposes. By 2002, more than 3,000 authors were producing works of children's literature. At the same time, the industry was hindered by high prices and a limited distribution network that focused primarily on urban centers.

== Themes and style ==
Generally, works of Chinese children's literature have served a didactic purpose, being intended as a means to transfer moral and cultural values to younger generations, as well as to develop language and critical thinking skills. Moral teachings were prominent in early Chinese works meant for children, with both the Three Character Classic and The Twenty-Four Filial Exemplars highlighting the importance of filial piety – understood not merely as children honoring their elders, but a continued commitment to one's parents and ancestors as well as one's family, clan, and society. Literature may be used to instill children with an appreciation for the history of Chinese culture as well as the virtues expected of them as members of society. At the same time, it can provide students with an introduction to empirical knowledge as well as guidance in social interactions. Language skills, including new characters, are also acquired as children read. Through the 1980s it was common for children to be positioned as uncritical readers of such works.

Republican Chinese children's literature varied thematically. Ye Shengtao used "Little White Boat", the first story in The Scarecrow, to highlight the innocence of children and juxtapose it with the tribulations of adulthood. Bing Xin highlighted love – for animals, for nature, and in general – even as she idealized the "natural innocence and sensitivity of children". Zhang Tianyi used humor to promote moral education, at the same time using allegory to highlight the plight of child labourers; his fairy tale "Big Lin and Little Lin" depicted a wealthy factory owner eating a hundred eggs a day – each egg a child who had been worked into exhaustion. Similar condemnation of capitalism and factories came from writers such as Guo Moruo (Only One Hand, 1928).

Since the establishment of the People's Republic of China, political education has driven much literature for children. Works may follow revolutionary heroes, labor heroes, or peasants, often coming into conflict with landlords and other members of the bourgeoisie. Characters such as Lei Feng and "Little Radish Head" are presented as models that should be emulated. Other works, such as Cui Daoyi's "The Road of a Young Pioneer Member" (1956), depicted children denouncing their capitalist parents.

Other works retell legends, fables, and historical tales. Traditional versions of such stories may be difficult for younger readers, and consequently these stories may be retold using simpler language and colorful illustrations. Works that are popularly adapted for child readers include Romance of the Three Kingdoms, Journey to the West, and Water Margin. Still more works of Chinese children's literature use contemporary settings, everyday situations, and child characters to convey lessons and teach problem-solving skills. Characters in such works tend to have limited arcs, but may show growth (from cowardice to courage, or selfishness to selflessness) over the course of the story. Issues explored in such works have, since the late 1990s, included work habits, the Chinese diaspora, and the effect of these phenomena on families. Works exploring the issues faced by children in modern China have included Yang Hongying's A Girl's Diary (2000), Cao Wenxuan's Straw Hut (2006), and Qin Wenjun's A New Biography of Schoolboy Jia Li (2010).

Poetry is taught to Chinese children from a young age, beginning with nursery rhymes and nonsense verse. Published children's poetry tends to use simple language, with rhymes used to teach pronunciation. Poems for children may use sensory imagery, or provide figurative comparisons or new paradigms that allow children to better understand their world. Children's poetry with communist themes can be traced back to the 1920s, with Peng Pai's 1921 song "The Peasants Curse the Landlord" being revived by the CCP in the 1960s.

== Awards and recognition ==
The first awards for children's literature in China were given out in 1954, and various exist such literary awards today. Prominent examples include:

- Chen Bochui Children's Literature Award
- Bing Xin Children's Literature Award
- National Outstanding Children's Literature Award
- Soong Ching-ling Children's Literature Prize
- Feng Zikai Chinese Children's Picture Book Award
