= Xue Tao (children's writer) =

Chinese writer of children's books

Xue Tao (simplified Chinese: 薛涛; traditional Chinese: 薛濤; pinyin: Xuē Tāo) is a Chinese writer of children's books.

== Life ==
Xue Tao was born in 1971 in Changtu county Liaoning province, China. He graduated from Tieling City Technical College, and the Chinese Dept of the Shenyang Teacher Training College. In 2010, he was one of the Top Ten Gold Writers in Children's Literature. In 2017 he became the 10th Vice Chairman of the Liaoning Province Writers Association.

== Awards ==
- Winner of a National Outstanding Children's Literature Award (5th awards, 1998–2000) for 《随蒲公英一起飞的女孩》 (The girl who flew with dandelions)
- Winner of a National Outstanding Children's Literature Award (8th awards, 2007–2009) for 《满山打鬼子》 (Fighting Monsters on the Hills)
- Soong Ching-ling Children's Literature Prize
- Bing Xin Children's Literature Award (2007) for 《小猪的诗意冬天》 (Little Pig's poetic winter)
- Chen Bochui Children's Literature Award (2014) for 《小城池》 (Little city)

== Books ==
- Across the River, illustrated by Anastasia Arkhipova
- 《山海经新传说》 (New Legends of the Shanhai jing)
- (《夸父与小菊仙》 (Kua Fu and Xiaojuxian)
- 《精卫鸟与女娃》 (The Jingwei Bird and Nvwa)
- 《盘古与透明女孩》 (Pangu and the transparent girl)
- 《正午的植物园》 (The Botanical Garden at Noon)
- 《打开天窗》 (Open the Skylight)
- 《蒲公英收购站》 (The Dandelion Collection Station)
- 《白鸟》 (White Bird)
- 《随蒲公英一起飞的女孩》 (The Girl who flew with the dandelions)
- 《如歌如诗》 (Like a song, like a poem)
- 《精灵闪现》 (The Pixie Appears in a Flash)
- 《废墟居民》 (Residents in the Ruins)
- 《泡泡儿去旅行》 (Bubble goes Travelling)
- 《虚狐》 (Fake Fox)
- 《花舍邮局 (Flower House Post Office)
- 《庚子红巾》 (Gengzi Red Scarf)
- 《海爸爸蓝房子》 (Sea Papa's Blue House)
