= National Outstanding Children's Literature Award =

Chinese awards run by the China Writers Association

The National Outstanding Children's Literature Award (Chinese: 全国优秀儿童文学奖) is a major literary award in China, established in 1986. It is run by the China Writers Association, and is awarded every three years in the categories of novels, picture books, poetry, essays and non-fiction.

It was one of a series of literary awards organised on a national level from 1978, typically known as "National Outstanding" prizes. In the 1950s there had been awards for theatrical works and performance, but not for fiction, poetry and the other arts.

== The First Awards (1980-1985) ==
Novels

- Yan Zhen 严阵 《荒漠奇踪》
- Yan Yan 颜烟 《盐丁儿》
- Ke Yan 柯岩 《寻找回来的世界》
- Xiao Yuxuan 萧育轩 《乱世少年》

Novellas

- Cheng Wei 程玮 《来自异国的孩子》
- Zheng Chunhua 郑春华 《紫罗兰幼儿园》

Short stories

- Guan Xizhi 关夕之 《五虎将和他们的教练》
- Qiu Xun 邱勋 《三色圆珠笔》
- Cao Wenxuan 曹文轩 《再见了，我的星星》
- Chang Xingang 常新港 《独船》
- Shen Shixi 沈石溪 《第七条猎狗》
- Liu Jingping 刘健屏 《我要我的雕刻刀》
- Luo Chensheng 罗辰生 《白脖儿》
- Zhang Yingwen 张映文 《扶我上战马的人》
- Wure'ertu 乌热尔图 《老人和鹿》
- Lin Jin 蔺瑾 《冰河上的激战》
- Liu Houming 刘厚明 《阿城的龟》
- Fang Guorong 方国荣 《彩色的梦》
- Liu Xinwu 刘心武 《我可不怕十三岁》

Medium length Young readers

- Lu Zhan 路展 《雁翅下的星光》
- Zhu Zhixiang 诸志祥 《黑猫警长》
- Ge Cuilin 葛翠琳 《翻跟头的小木偶》

Short Young readers

- Sun Youjun 孙幼军 《小狗的小房子》
- Zong Pu 宗璞 《总鳍鱼的故事》
- Wu Mengqi 吴梦起 《老鼠看下棋》
- Zhao Yanyi 赵燕翼 《小燕子和它的三邻居》
- Zheng Yuanjie 郑渊洁 《开直升飞机的小老鼠》
- Hong Xuntao 洪汛涛 《狼毫笔的来历》

Poetry

- Gao Hongbo 高洪波 《我想》
- Tian Di 田地 《我爱我的祖国》
- Jin Bo 金波 《春的消息》
- Fan Fajia 樊发稼 《小娃娃的歌》
- Shen Aiping 申爱萍 《再给陌生的父亲》

Essays

- Zhang Qi 张岐 《俺家门前的海》
- Qiao Chuanzao 乔传藻 《醉麂》
- Chen Danyan 陈丹燕 《中国少女》
- Chen Yi 陈益 《十八双鞋》

Fables

- Qu Yiri 曲一日 《狐狸艾克》

Reportage

- Hu Jingfang 胡景芳 《作家与少年犯》
- Dong Hongyou 董宏猷 《王江旋风》

Sci-fi

- Zheng Wenguang 郑文光 《神翼》

== The Second Awards (1986-1991) ==
Novels

- Liu Jianping 刘健屏 《今年你七岁》
- Shen Shixi 沈石溪 《一只猎雕的遭遇》
- Qiu Xun 邱勋 《雪国梦》
- Li Jianshu 李建树 《走向审判庭》
- Luo Chensheng 罗辰生 《下世纪的公民们》
- Qin Wenjun 秦文君 《少女罗薇》
- Cao Wenxuan 曹文轩 《山羊不吃天堂草》
- Guan Dengying 关登瀛 《西部流浪记》
- Jin Cenghao 金曾豪 《狼的故事》
- Cheng Wei 程玮 《少女的红发卡》
- Han Huiguang 韩辉光 《校园喜剧》
- Zhang Zhilu 张之路 《第三军团》
- Chang Xingang 常新港 《青春的荒草地》
- Ge Bing 葛冰 《绿猫》

Young readers

- Zhang Qiusheng 张秋生 《小巴掌童话》
- Zhou Rui 周锐 《扣子老三》
- Zheng Yunqin 郑允钦 《吃耳朵的妖精》
- Sun Youjun 孙幼军 《怪老头儿》
- Jin Bo 冰波 《毒蜘蛛之死》

Essays and reportage

- Wu Ran 吴然 《小鸟在歌唱》
- Sun Yunxiao 孙云晓 《16岁的思索》
- Guo Feng 郭风 《孙悟空在我们村子里》
- Ban Ma 班马 《星球的细语》

Poetry

- Xu Lu 徐鲁 《我们这个年纪的梦》
- Jin Bo 金波 《在我和你之间》
- Liu Bingjun 刘丙钧 《绿蚂蚁》

Picture books

- Xie Hua 谢华 《岩石上的小蝌蚪》
- Xue Weimin 薛卫民 《快乐的小动物》
- Lu Bing 鲁兵 《虎娃》

== The Third Awards (1992-1994) ==
Novels

- Qin Wenjun 秦文君 《男生贾里》
- Jin Cenghao 金曾豪 《青春口哨》
- Dong Hongxian 董宏猷 《十四岁的森林》
- Cong Weixi 从维熙 《裸雪》
- Che Peijing 车培晶 《神秘的猎人》
- Guan Dengyin 关登瀛 《小脚印》
- Zhang Zhilu 张之路 《有老鼠片铅笔吗》
- Shen Shixi 沈石溪 《红奶羊》

Young readers

- Bing Bo 冰波 《狼蝙蝠》
- Zhou Rui 周锐 《哼哈二将》
- Zheng Yunqin 郑允钦 《树怪巴克夏》
- Ge Cuilin 葛翠琳 《会唱歌的画像》

Poetry

- Qiu Yidong 邱易东 《到你的远山去》
- Jin Bo 金波 《林中月夜》

Essays

- Gao Hongbo 高洪波 《悄悄话》
- Pang Min 庞敏 《淡淡的白梅》
- Su Shuyang 苏叔阳 《我们的母亲叫中国》

Picture books

- Zhang Qiusheng 张秋生 《鹅妈妈和西瓜蛋》
- Zheng Chunhua 郑春华 《大头儿子小头爸爸》

== The Fourth Awards (1995-1997) ==
Novels

- Jin Cenghao 金曾豪 《苍狼》
- Qin Wenjun 秦文君 《小鬼鲁智胜》
- Mei Zihan 梅子涵 《女儿的故事》
- Cao Wenxuan 曹文轩 《草房子》 – English translation The Grass House by Helen Wang (Balestier Press, 2024)
- Huang Beijia 黄蓓佳 《我要做好孩子》 – English translation I Want To Be Good by Nicky Harman (New Classic Press, 2021)
- Yu Xiu 郁秀 《花季•雨季》

Novellas and short stories

- Zhang Pincheng 张品成 《赤色小子》
- Dong Hongxian 董宏猷 《一百个中国孩子的梦》

Young readers

- Sun Youjun 孙幼军 《唏哩呼噜历险记》
- Tang Sulan 汤素兰 《小朵朵与半个巫婆》
- Bao Dongni 保冬妮 《屎克郎先生波比拉》
- Zhang Zhilu 张之路 《我和我的影子》

Picture books

- Wang Xiaoming 王晓明 《花生米样的云》
- Zheng Chunhua 郑春华 《大头儿子和隔壁大大叔》
- Ye Jun 野军 《长鼻子和短鼻子》

Poetry

- Xue Weimin 薛卫民 《为一片绿叶而歌》

Essays

- Liu Xianping 刘先平 《扇叶寻趣》

Non-fiction

- Lin Fengjie 李凤杰 《还你一片蓝天》

== The Fifth Awards (1998-2000) ==
Novels

- Zhou Rui 周锐 and Zhou Shuangning 周双宁 《中国兔子德国草》
- Huang Zhesheng 黄喆生 《吹响欧巴》
- Fang Min 方敏 《大绝唱》
- Qin Wenjun 秦文君 《属于少年刘格诗的自白》

Novellas and short stories

- Xue Tao 薛涛 《随蒲公英一起飞的女孩》
- Zhang Pincheng 张品成 《永远的哨兵》

Young readers

- Tang Sulan 汤素兰 《笨狼的故事》

Essays

- Gu Ying 谷应 《中国孩子的梦》
- Wu Ran 吴然 《小霞客西南游》
- Sun Youjun 孙幼军 《怪老头随想录》

Poetry

- Jin Bo 金波 《我们去看海》
- Wang Yizhen 王宜振 《笛王的故事》

Picture books

- Zheng Chunhua 郑春华 《幼儿园的男老师》

Fables

- Yu Yu 雨雨 《美食家狩猎》

Sci-Fi

- Zhang Zhilu 张之路 《非法智慧》

Biography and non-fiction

- Chao Yang 巢扬 《严文井评传》
- Liu Xianping 刘先平 《黑叶猴王国探险记》

Young authors

- Wang Yimei 王一梅 《书本里的蚂蚁》
- Gao Kai 高凯 and Cun Xiao 村小 《生字课》
- Lin Yan 林彦 《单纯》

== The Sixth Awards (2001-2003) ==
Novels

- Cao Wenxuan 曹文轩 《细米》
- Chang Xingang 常新港 《陈土的六根头发》
- Shen Shixi 沈石溪 《鸟奴》
- Yang Hongying 杨红樱 《漂亮老师和坏小子》

Novellas and short stories

- Liu Dong 刘东 《轰然作响的记忆》

Young readers

- Wang Yimei 王一梅 《鼹鼠的月亮河》
- Bing Bo 冰波 《阿笨猫全传》
- Jin Bo 金波 《乌丢丢的奇遇》
- Xiong Lei 熊磊 《小鼹鼠的土豆》

Poetry

- Wang Lichun 王立春 《骑扁马的扁人》

Essays

- Jin Cenghao 金曾豪 《蓝调江南》

Non-fiction

- Niu Niu 妞妞 《长翅膀的绵阳》

Literary criticism

- Xu Yan 徐妍 《凄美的深潭：“低龄化写作”对传统儿童文学的颠覆》

Young authors

- San San 三三 《一只与肖恩同岁的鸡》
- Zhai Haihong 赵海虹 《追日》

== The Seventh Awards (2004-2006) ==
Novels

- San San 三三 《舞蹈课》
- Gerelchimeg Blackcrane 格日勒其木格•黑鹤 《黑焰》 – English translation Black Flame by Anna Holmwood (Groundwood Books, 2013)
- Xie Qianni 谢倩霓 《喜欢不是罪》
- Li Xuebin 李学斌 《蔚蓝色的夏天》
- Cao Wenxuan 曹文轩 《青铜葵花》 – English translation Bronze and Sunflower by Helen Wang (Walker Books, 2015)

Novellas and short stories

- Chang Xing'er 常星儿 《回望沙原》

Young readers

- Pi Zhaohui 皮朝辉 《面包狼》
- Ge Cuilin 葛翠琳 《核桃山》

Poetry

- Zhang Xiaonan 张晓楠 《叶子是树的羽毛》

Essays

- Peng Xuejun 彭学军 《纸风铃•紫风铃》

Non-fiction

- Han Qingchen 韩青辰 《飞翔，哪怕翅膀断了心》

Sci-fi

- Zhang Zhilu 张之路 《极限幻觉》

Young authors

- Li Liping 李丽萍 《选一个人去天国》

== The Eighth Awards (2007-2009) ==
Novels

- Zheng Chunhua 郑春华 《非常小子马鸣加》
- Huang Beijia 黄蓓佳 《你是我的宝贝》
- Peng Xuejun 彭学军 《腰门》
- Zeng Xiaojun 曾小春 《公元前的桃花》
- Wang Jucheng 王巨成 《穿过忧伤的花季》
- Yi Ping 翌平 《少年摔跤王》
- Gerelchimeg Blackcrane 格日勒其木格•黑鹤 《狼獾河》
- Xue Tao 薛涛 《满山打鬼子》
- Cao Wenxuan 曹文轩 《黄琉璃》 – English translation The Amber Tiles by Nicholas Richards (Daylight Publishing House, 2015)

Young readers

- Li Donghua 李东华 《猪笨笨的幸福时光》
- Tang Sulan 汤素兰 《奇迹花园》
- Jin Bo 金波 《蓝雪花》

Poetry

- Xiao Ping 萧萍 《狂欢节，女王一岁了》

Essays

- Wu Ran 吴然 《踩新路》

Picture books

- Bai Bing 白冰 《狐狸鸟》

Reportage

- Qiu Yidong 邱易东 《空巢十二月：留守中学生的成长故事》

Sci-fi

- Zhang Zhilu 张之路 《小猪大侠莫跑跑•绝境逢生》
- Wei Menghua 位梦华 《独闯北极》

Literary criticism

- Zhang Jinyi 张锦贻 《改革开放30年的少数民族儿童文学》

Young authors

- Tang Tang 汤汤 《到你心里躲一躲》

== The Ninth Awards (2010-2012) ==
Novels

- Hu Jifeng 胡继风 《鸟背上的故乡》
- Zhang Zhilu 张之路 《千雯之舞》
- Deng Xiangzi 邓箱子 《像风一样奔跑》
- Li Qiuyuan 李秋沅 《木棉•流年》
- Chang Xingang 常新港 《五头蒜》
- Cao Wenxuan 曹文轩 《丁丁当当•盲羊》
- Mu Ling 牧铃 《影子行动》

Poetry

- Ren Rongrong 任溶溶 《我成了个隐身人》
- An Wulin 安武林 《月光下的蝈蝈》

Young readers

- Tang Tang 汤汤 《汤汤缤纷成长童话集》
- Zuo Xuan 左昡 《住在房梁上的必必》
- Xiao Mao 萧袤 《住在先生小姐城》
- Liu Haiqi 刘海栖 《无尾小鼠历险记•没尾巴的烦恼》

Essays

- Sun Weiwei 孙卫卫 《小小孩的春天》
- Han Kaichun 韩开春 《虫虫》

Sci-fi

- Hu Donglin 胡冬林 《巨虫公园》
- Liu Cixin 刘慈欣 《三体3•死神永生》 – English translation Death's End by Ken Liu (Tor Books, 2016)

Picture books

- Zhang Jie 张洁 《穿着绿披风的吉莉》
- Dan Yingqi 单瑛琪 《小嘎豆有十万个鬼点子•好好吃饭》

Young writers

- Chen Shige 陈诗哥 《风居住的街道》

== The Tenth Awards (2013-2017) ==
A total of 18 prizewinners were announced. The chairs of the judging committee were Tie Ning 铁凝 and Li Jingze 李敬泽, and the deputy chairs were Yan Jingming 阎晶明, Fang Weiping 方卫平 and Tang Sulan 汤素兰.
Novels

- Dong Hongyou 董宏猷 《一百个孩子的中国梦》
- Mai Zi 麦子 《大熊的女儿》
- Zhang Wei 张炜 《寻找鱼王》
- Shi Lei 史雷 《将军胡同》
- Xiao Ping 萧萍 《沐阳上学记•我就是喜欢唱反调》
- Zhang Zhilu 张之路 《吉祥时光》
- Peng Xuejun 彭学军 《浮桥边的汤木》

Poetry

- Wang Lichun 王立春 《梦的门》

Young readers

- Guo Jiangyan 郭姜燕 《布罗镇的邮递员》
- Lu Lina 吕丽娜 《小女孩的名字》
- Tang Tang 汤汤 《水妖喀喀莎》
- Zhou Jing 周静 《一千朵跳跃的花蕾》

Essays

- Yin Jianling 殷健灵 《爱——外婆和我》

Reportage

- Shu Huibo 舒辉波 《梦想是生命里的光》

Sci-fi

- Wang Linbai 王林柏 《拯救天才》
- Zhao Hua 赵华 《大漠寻星人》

Picture books

- Sun Yuhu 孙玉虎 《其实我是一条鱼》
- Li Shabai 李少白 《蒲公英嫁女儿》

== The Eleventh Awards (2018-2021) ==
A total of 18 works were selected. The chair of the judging committee was Tie Ning 铁凝.
Novels

- Gerelchimeg Blackcrane 格日勒其木格•黑鹤 《驯鹿六季》
- Hu Yonghong 胡永红 《上学谣》
- Liu Haiqi 刘海栖 《有鸽子的夏天》
- Shu Huibo 舒辉波 《逐光的孩子》
- Xie Hualiang 谢华良 《陈土豆的红灯笼》
- Yang Zhijun 杨志军 《巴颜喀拉山的孩子》
- Ye Guangqin 叶广芩 《耗子大爷起晚了》

Young readers

- Chi Hui 迟慧 《慢小孩》
- Ge Jing 葛竞 《南村传奇》
- Tang Sulan 汤素兰 《南村传奇》
- Zhou Xiaofeng 周晓枫 《小翅膀》

Picture books

- Huang Yu 黄宇 《小小小世界》
- Zhang Qiusheng 张秋生 《小巴掌童话诗•恐龙妈妈孵蛋》

Sci-fi

- Ma Chuansi 马传思 《奇迹之夏》
- Wu Yan 吴岩 《中国轨道号》

Poetry

- Lan Lan 蓝蓝 《我和毛毛》

Essays

- Xiang Nü 湘女 《好想长成一棵树》

Young writers

- Xu Jin 徐瑾 《坐在石阶上叹气的怪小孩》

== The Twelfth Awards (2021-2024) ==
A total of 18 works were selected.
Novels

- Cai Chongda 蔡崇达 《我人生最开始的好朋友》
- Da Xiu 大秀 《大河的歌谣》
- Lu Mei 陆梅 《万花筒》
- Qi Zhi 祁智 《方一禾，快跑》
- Wang Yongying 王勇英 《狼洞的外婆》
- Xu Tingting 许廷旺 《额吉的河》
- Zhou Min 周敏 《胡同也有小时候》

Poetry

- Tong Zi 童子 《我知道所有问题的答案了》

Young readers

- Ci Qi 慈琪 《外婆变成了麻猫》
- Li Shanshan 李姗姗 《器成千年》
- Nuo Ya 诺亚 《白夜梦想家》
- Zhao Lihong 赵丽宏 《月光蟋蟀》
- Zhao Maomao 赵卯卯 《我的，我的》

Sci-fi

- Jia Yu 贾煜《改造天才》
- Wang Weilian 王威廉 《火苗照亮宇宙：暗生命传奇》

Picture books

- Cai Gao 蔡皋 《不能没有》
- Wan Wan 弯弯 and Liu Xuechun 刘雪纯 《妈妈的剪影》

Young writers

- Wang Luqi 王璐琪《守护神》
