= Peter Williams (physician) =

Peter Williams CBE FRCP
- Born: Peter Orchard Williams; 23 September 1925; Port of Spain, Trinidad and Tobago
- Died: 25 July 2014 (aged 88); Woodstock, Oxfordshire, England
- Employer: Medical Research Council

Peter Orchard Williams (23 September 1925 − 25 July 2014) was a British physician, who served as Director of the Wellcome Trust, and of the Wellcome Institute for the History of Medicine.

The son of Agnes (née Birkinshaw) and Robert Williams, he was born on 23 September 1925 in Port of Spain, Trinidad and Tobago, where his father, a botanist, was curator of the Royal Botanic Gardens.

He read medicine at the University of Cambridge for two years, then spent four years at St Mary's Hospital Medical School. He undertook National Service with the Royal Army Medical Corps for three years, spending some time in Germany. on his return, he was employed from 1955 to 1960 by the Medical Research Council as a medical officer.

Williams joined the Wellcome Trust in 1960, becoming director in 1965, and retiring from there in 1991. During that time, he managed a hundred-fold increase in the Trust's budget.

Williams was awarded honorary degrees by the University of Birmingham (1989), University of Nottingham (1990). University of the West Indies (1991). University of Glasgow (1992), and University of Oxford (1993).

He was made a Commander of the Order of the British Empire (CBE) in the 1991 Birthday Honours. He was a founder member of The Hague Club, and of the Association of Medical Research Charities. He was president of the Royal Society of Tropical Medicine and Hygiene from 1991 to 1993.

Williams died on 25 July 2014, aged 89, in Woodstock, Oxfordshire.
