= Zhu Chengliang =

Chinese author and illustrator

Zhu Chengliang 朱成梁 is a prizewinning Chinese author and illustrator of children's books, often using traditional Chinese painting styles.

== Biography ==
Zhu Chengliang was born in Shanghai in 1948, and spent his childhood in Suzhou. He studied at the Department of Fine Art, Nanjing University, and has worked as an author, illustrator, editor and designer. He is currently Deputy Chief Editor of the Jiangsu Fine Arts Publishing House.

== Awards and honours ==
- Grandpa's Tinderbox was nominated for the IBBY Honour List 2014
- A New Year's Reunion (Chinese edition) won first prize in the Feng Zikai Children's Book Award 2010
- A New Year's Reunion (English translation) was listed as one of the 2011 Ten Best Illustrated Books by The New York Times
- The Sparkling Rabbit-Shaped Lamp was a Runner Up in the 4th UNESCO Noma Concours for Picture Book Illustrations (1984)

== Works ==
- All in a Day (author: Mitsumasa Anno), 1986
- The Story of the Kitchen God, 1988
- Flame (author: Xi Dun= ET Seton), 2007
- A New Year's Reunion (author: Yu Li-qiong), 2008
- Grandpa's Tinderbox, 2013
- Sweet Laba Congee (author: Zhang Qiusheng), Reycraft Books, 2020
