= Ge Cuilin =

Chinese children's author (1930–2022)

- 葛翠琳
- Born: February 1930; Laoting County, Hebei
- Died: 27 December 2022 (aged 92); Beijing
- Education: Yenching University
- Writing career
- Genre: Children's literature
- Notable work: Wild Grape (1956)
- Notable awards: National Outstanding Children's Literature Award

Ge Cuilin (Chinese: 葛翠琳; 1930–2022) was a Chinese children's author. Known principally for her fairy tales, she also wrote essays, plays, and a novel. She won the National Outstanding Children's Literature Award of the Chinese Writers Association multiple times. Her 1956 fairy tale collection Wild Grape was adapted into a puppet film and translated into several languages. She co-founded the Bing Xin Children's Literature Award with Han Suyin and Bing Xin. She was a member of the All-China Women's Federation and graduated from Yenching University.

== Early life and education ==
Ge Cuilin was born in Laoting County, Hebei province, in February 1930 to a Han Chinese family. She attended Yenching University, graduating from the Department of Sociology.

== Career ==
Ge started her career in 1942 and was assigned to the Beijing Federation of Literary and Art Circles. She was a writer-in-residence with the Beijing Writers Association and wrote scripts for the Beijing Puppet Theater troupe. During her literary career, Ge wrote multiple essays, a novel, fairy tales, poems, plays, and children's literature. She started publishing in 1949 and used the pen name Yinglin (婴林).

Ge is most well known for her 1956 fairy tale collection Wild Grape. Many of the fairy tales in the collection were based on Northern Chinese folklore and legends. The collection was translated into Japanese, English, German, Russian, and French. It was also adapted into a puppet film that won the Youth TV Program Award at the Munich TV Festival in 1986. The Chinese Writers Association awarded her the National Outstanding Children's Literature Award for her fairy tales Walnut Mountain, Puppet Somersaulting, Wild Grape, and Portrait of Singing.

In 1957, during the Anti-Rightist Campaign, Ge was labelled a rightist by Maoist elements. During the 1970s, she was rehabilitated. She was a member of the Chinese Communist Party and served as a member of the Beijing Municipal Committee during the sixth and seventh sessions of the Chinese People's Political Consultative Conference. She was also an executive member of the All-China Women's Federation. She became a member of the Chinese Writers Association in 1979. The following year, she joined the Beijing Writers Association.

Ge's essay "Where is the Soul" won an award at the Beijing Municipal Celebration of the 45th Anniversary of the Founding of New China. She co-founded the Bing Xin Children's Literature Award with Han Suyin and Bing Xin in 1990. At the 50th anniversary of the Beijing Federation of Literary and Art Circles, she was awarded the Literary and Artistic Creation Contribution Award. Cuilin continued publishing works well into the 2000s. Her essay collection Eighteen Beautiful Dreams was published in 2000.

Ge died in Beijing on 27 December 2022.

== Selected works ==
=== Novel ===
- Blue-winged Bird (蓝翅鸟)

=== Essays ===
- "Where the Soul Lies"
- "Farewell to Tiananmen"
- "The Strength of the Rose"
- "Blood and Tears of a Magnificent Life"
- "The Sea and Roses" (大海与玫瑰)

=== Fairy tales ===
- Wild Grapes (野葡萄)
- Lucky Star
- Bird Child
- Somersaulting Puppet (翻筋斗的小木偶)
- Walnut Mountain (核桃山)
- Singing Portrait (会唱歌的画像)

=== Poetry ===
- "Our Little Captain"

=== Plays ===
- Little Rascal's Resolution (collection of plays)
- Wild Swan (野天鹅)
