= All in a Day =

Book by Mitsumasa Anno

- First UK edition
- Author: Mitsumasa Anno
- Illustrator: Mitsumasa Anno; Eric Carle; Raymond Briggs; Nicolai Ye. Popov; Akiko Hayashi; Gian Calvi; Leo and Diane Dillon; Zhu Chengliang; Ron Brooks
- Cover artist: Anno, Carle, Briggs, Popov, Hayashi, Calvi, Dillon, Chengliang, Brooks
- Language: English, Japanese
- Genre: Children's
- Publisher: Philomel Books (US); Hamish Hamilton (UK)
- Publication date: 1986
- Publication place: United States, Japan
- Pages: 22 pp
- ISBN: 0-399-21311-2
- OCLC: 13328423
- Dewey Decimal: [E] 19
- LC Class: PZ7.A5875 Al 1986

All in a Day is a 1986 children's picture book written and illustrated by Mitsumasa Anno. It features illustrations by Anno and several other internationally known illustrators: Eric Carle, Raymond Briggs, Nicolai Ye. Popov, Akiko Hayashi, Gian Calvi, Leo and Diane Dillon, Zhu Chengliang and Ron Brooks.

== Description ==
Ten artists illustrate the simultaneous moments on January 1 in the lives of children in nine locations on Earth. Information about planetary rotation, world time zones and seasons follows the inviting full-colour wordless picture vignettes.

The inspiration for this book arose when Anno was overwhelmed by "the finest sunset on earth" at Uskudar in Istanbul. Anno then realized that the sun which was just setting in front of him was at the very same time, a rising sun in some other country. This meant that this same sun was going down in a country at war and at that same time, it was rising in a country at peace.

== Review ==
School Library Journal said it was "a great success at conveying the warmth, richness, and variety of people" and Booklist noted that it "promotes peace and mutual understanding among children around the world."
