= Zhang Qiusheng =

Chinese writer of children's books (1939–2022)

Zhang Qiusheng (Chinese: 张秋生) (August 1939 – 4 October 2022) was a Chinese writer of children's books.

Born in August 1939 in Shanghai, Zhang started to write children's songs and poetry in 1958. He was editor of the journal Children's Times (Ertong Shidai 儿童时代), before moving back to Shanghai to be deputy editor, then editor, of Shanghai Youth News (Shanghai shaonian baoshe 上海少年报社), and editor-in-chief of the Children's Paper (Tonghua bao 童话报).

== Selected publications ==
- 《“啄木鸟”团队》 ("Woodpecker" team)
- 《校园里的玫瑰》 (Roses on the campus)
- 《小猴学本领》 (Little Monkey Learning Skills)
- 《小粗心奇遇》 (Little Careless Adventure)
- 《天上来的百兽王》 (The king of beasts from heaven)
- 《小松鼠和他的伙伴们》 (Little squirrel and his friends)
- 《小巴掌童话百篇》 (Hundreds of fairy tales)
- 《丫形树上的初级女巫》 (The Junior Witch on the Ya-shaped Tree)
- 《鸡蛋·鸭蛋·老鼠蛋》 (Eggs, Duck Eggs, Mouse Eggs)
- 《来自桦树林的蒙面盗》 (Masked Pirate from the Birch Grove)
- 《狮子和老做不醒的梦》 (The lion and the always dreaming)
- 《强盗、精灵和巫婆的故事》 (The story of robbers, elves and witches)
- 《新编小巴掌童话百篇》 (Hundreds of new fairy tales)
- 《张秋生童话精选》 (Selection of Zhang Qiusheng's Fairy Tales)
- 《森林里的红鬼和蓝鬼》 (Red ghost and blue ghost in the forest)
- 《傻瓜魔法师》 (Fool magician)
- 《骑在扫帚上听歌的巫婆》 (Witch on a broomstick listening to a song)
- 《阁楼上的童话》 (Fairy tale in the attic)

Picture books

- 《洗四十双袜子的小波波熊》 -- Little Koko Bear and his socks, illus. Xu Kaiyun (Reycraft Books, 2019)
- 《香香甜甜的腊八粥》 -- Sweet Laba Congee, illus. Zhu Chengliang (Reycraft Books, 2020)

== Awards and honours ==
- 2020 Chen Bochui International Children's Literature Award – Special Contribution Award
- 2007 Chen Bochui International Children's Literature Award – Outstanding Work Award – for New collection of 100 palm-sized fairy tales 新编小巴掌童话百篇
- Soong Ching-ling Children's Literature Prize – Third Prize – for New collection of 100 palm-sized fairy tales 新编小巴掌童话百篇
- National Outstanding Children's Literature Award – for Palm-sized fairy tales 小巴掌童话
- 2003 Soong Ching-ling Children's Literature Prize – Gold Book Award – for Witch on a Broomstick Listening to a Song 骑在扫帚上听歌的巫婆
- National Outstanding Children's Literature Award – for Mother Goose and the Watermelon Egg 鹅妈妈和西瓜蛋
