= Nine Songs Children's Literature Award =

The Nine Songs Contemporary Children's Literature Award (九歌現代少兒文學獎), or Nine Songs Children's Literature Award (九歌儿童文学奖), is an award for children’s literature created in Taiwan. Eligible works should be between 40,000-45,000 words, and suitable to children aged 10–15 years. Also known as the ChiuKo Award.

== History ==
The award was launched in 1992 by the Jiu Ge Cultural and Educational Foundation (founded by Chiuko [pinyin: Jiu Ge] Publishers, which was founded by Tsai Wen-fu) with the specific aim of encouraging the creation of children’s literature in Taiwan. Nine Songs refers to Jiu Ge, nine songs attributed to the poet Qu Yuan, in the third century BC. A list of award-winners with details of their books is available in Chinese.

== 25th Awards (2017) ==
104 works were considered were considered by judges Li Weiwen 李偉文, Ling Xingjie 凌性傑, Chen Anyi 陳安儀, Feng Jimei 馮季眉, You Peiyun 游珮芸

- First Prize: 李明珊:《飛鞋》 - Li Mingshan
- Prize: 范芸萍:《巴洛‧瓦旦》 - Fan Yunping
- Prize: 董少尹:《網球少年》 - Dong Shaoyin
- Prize: 李光福:《舞街少年》 - Li Guangfu
- Prize: 劉美瑤:《撒野的憤怒馬桶》 - Liu Meiyao

== 24th Awards (2016) ==
121 works considered by judges: Ling Xingjie 凌性傑、Xu Jiankun 許建崑、Zhang Gui’e 張桂娥、Huang Qiufang 黃秋芳、Huang Cuihua 黃翠華

- First Prize: 張英珉：《長跑少年》 - Zhang Yingmin
- Prize: 評審獎：范芸萍《心靈魔方》 - Fan Yunping
- Prize: 李光福：《棒球、鴨蛋和我》 - Li Guangfu
- Prize: 李慧娟：《打發時間圖書館》 - Li Huijuan
- Prize: 董少尹：《阿父塔繃牛兒！》 - Dong Shaoyin

== 16th Awards (2008) ==
- First Prize: 鄭淑麗: 《月芽灣的寶藏》 - Zheng Shuli
- Prize: 陸麗雅: 《阿祖的魔法天書》 - Li Liya
- Prize: 陳韋任: 《灰姑娘變身日記》 - Chen Weiren
- Prize: 洪雅齡: 《躲進部落格》 - Hong Yaling
- Prize: 花格子: 《揚帆吧！八級風》 - Hua Gezi
- Prize: 胡圓: 《勇闖「不管里」》 - Hu Yuan
- Prize: 陳怡如: 《第十二張生肖卡》 - Chen Yiru
- Prize: 孫昱: 《藍月亮，紅月亮》 - Sun Yu

== 15th Awards (2007) ==
- First Prize: 鄭丞鈞：《帶著阿公走》 - Zheng Chengjun
- Prize: 孫昱：《神祕島》 - Sun Yu
- Prize: 蘇善：《凹凸星球》 - Su Shan
- Prize: 姜子安：《金鑰匙》 - Jiang Zi'an
- Prize: 蔡聖華: 《歡迎光臨幸福小館》 - Cai Shenghua
- Prize: 陳韋任：紐約老鼠》 - Chen Weiren
- Prize: 黃少芬：《夢與辣椒》 - Huang Shaofen
- Prize: 李慧娟：《我的神祕訪客》 - Li Huijuan

== 14th Awards (2006) ==
- Prize: 陳三義：《他不麻煩，他是我弟弟》 - Chen Sanyi
- Prize: 劉美瑤：《網站奇緣》 - Liu Meiyao
- Prize: 王文美：《女籃特攻隊》 - Wang Wenmei
- Prize: 呂淑敏：《天使帶我轉個彎》 - Lv Shumin
- Prize: 鄭丞鈞：《我的麗莎阿姨》 - Zheng Chengjun
- Prize: 李慧娟：《走了一個小偷之後》 - Li Huijuan
- Prize: 陳維鸚：《變身魔法石》 - Chen Weiying
- Prize: 雪涅：《我們這一班》》 - Xue Nie
- Prize: 陳三義：《他不麻煩，他是我弟弟(增訂新版)》 - Chen Sanyi

== 13th Awards (2005) ==
- Prize: 劉翰師：《阿西跳月》 - Liu Hanshi
- Prize: 謝鴻文：《老樹公在哭泣》 - Xie Hongwen
- Prize: 雪涅：《拉薩小子》 - Xue Nie
- Prize: 劉美瑤：《神秘的白塔》 - Liu Meiyao
- Prize: 柯惠玲：《珊瑚男孩》 - Ke Huiling
- Prize: 陳維：《變成松鼠的女孩》 - Chen Wei
- Prize: 史冀儒：《尋找小丑族》 - Shi Jiru
- Prize: 饒雪漫：《莞爾的幸福地圖》 - Rao Xueman

== 12th Awards (2004) ==
- Prize: 毛威麟：《藍天鴿笭》 - Mao Weilin
- Prize: 彭素華：《紅眼巨人》 - Peng Suhua
- Prize: 呂紹澄：《有了一隻鴨子》 - Lv Shaocheng
- Prize: 林杏亭：《流星雨》 - Lin Xingting
- Prize: 姜天陸：《戰地春聲》 - Jiang Tianlu
- Prize: 蘇善：《阿樂拜師》 - Su Shan
- Prize: 王俍凱：《米呼米桑‧歡迎你》 - Wang Liangkai
- Prize: 劉美瑤：《剝開橘子以後》 - Liu Meiyao

== 11th Awards (2003) ==
- Prize: 林佑儒：《圖書館精靈》 - Lin Youru
- Prize: 梁雅雯：《一樣的媽媽不一樣》 - Liang Yawen
- Prize: 陸麗雅：《我家是鬼屋》 - Lu Liya
- Prize: 劉碧玲：《貓女》 - Liu Biling
- Prize: 饒雪漫：《花糖紙》 - Rao Xueman
- Prize: 王文華：《年少青春紀事》 - Wang Wenhua
- Prize: 王樂群：《基因猴王》 - Wang Lequn
- Prize: 馬筱鳳：《泰雅少年巴隆》 - Ma Xiaofeng

== 10th Awards (2002) ==
- Prize: 呂紹澄：《創意神豬》 - Lv Shaocheng
- Prize: 李志偉：《七彩肥皂泡》 - Li Zhiwei
- Prize: 林佩蓉：《風與天使的故鄉》 - Lin Peirong
- Prize: 林舒嫺：《來去樂比樂》 - Lin Shuxian
- Prize: 羅世孝：《下課鐘響》 - Luo Shixiao
- Prize: 黃秋芳：《魔法雙眼皮》 - Huang Qiufang
- Prize: 黃麗秋：《黃色蝴蝶結》 - Huang Liqiu
- Prize: 鄭如晴：《少年鼓王》 - Zheng Ruqing
- Prize: 陳沛慈：《寒冬中的報歲蘭》 - Chen Peici
- Prize: 陳貴美：《陽光叔叔》 - Chen Guimei
- Prize: 王蔚：《逃家奇遇記》 - Wang Wei
- Prize: 盧振中：《尋找蟋蟀王》 - Lu Zhenzhong

== 9th Awards (2001) ==
- Prize: 馮傑：《少年放蜂記》 - Feng Jie
- Prize: 林音因：《藍天使》 - Lin Yinyin
- Prize: 鄭宗弦：《媽祖回娘家》 - Zheng Zongxian
- Prize: 陳貴美：《送奶奶回家》 - Chen Guimei
- Prize: 陳肇宜：《我們的山》 - Chen Zhaoyi
- Prize: 臧保琦：《河水，流呀流》 - Zang Baoqi
- Prize: 王文華：《再見，大橋再見》 - Wang Wenhua
- Prize: 王晶：《超級小偵探》 - Wang Jing

== 8th Awards (2000) ==
- Prize: 鄭宗弦：《又見寒煙壺》 - Zheng Zongxian
- Prize: 蒙永麗：《蒼白與憂鬱》 - Meng Yongli
- Prize: 林音因：《期待》 - Lin Yinyin
- Prize: 侯維玲：《二○九九》 - Hou Weiling
- Prize: 鄒敦怜：《蘭花緣》 - Zou Dunlian
- Prize: 王文華：《南昌大街》 - Wang Wenhua
- Prize: 王晶：《世界毀滅之後》 - Wang Jing

== 7th Awards (1999) ==
- Prize: 劉碧玲：《姊妹》 - Liu Biling
- Prize: 匡立杰：《藍溪紀事》 - Kuang Lijie
- Prize: 鄭宗弦：《第一百面金牌》 - Zheng Zongxian
- Prize: 陳瑞璧：《阿公放蛇》 - Chen Ruibi
- Prize: 劉俐綺：《蘋果日記》 - Liu Liqi

== 6th Awards (1998) ==
- Prize: 劉臺痕：《鳳凰山傳奇》 - Liu Taihen
- Prize: 盧振中：《荒原上的小涼棚》 - Lu Zhenzhong
- Prize: 陳愫儀：《孿生國度》 - Chen Suyi
- Prize: 姜子安：《我愛綠蠵龜》 - Jiang Zi'an
- Prize: 鄭宗弦：《姑姑家的夏令營》 - Zheng Zongxian

== 5th Awards (1997) ==
- Prize: 屠佳：《藍藍的天上白雲飄》 - Tu Jia
- Prize: 林小晴：《紅帽子西西》 - Lin Xiaoqing
- Prize: 眠月：《少年行星》 - Mian Yue
- Prize: 陳素宜：《選擇》 - Chen Suyi
- Prize: 木子：《小子阿辛》 - Muzi

== 4th Awards (1996) ==
- Prize: 莫劍蘭：《兩本日記》 - Mo Jianlan
- Prize: 馮傑：《冬天裡的童話》 - Feng Jie
- Prize: 盧振中：《阿高斯失蹤之謎》 - Lu Zhenzhong
- Prize: 黃淑美：《永遠小孩》 - Huang Shumei
- Prize: 陳素宜：《秀巒山上的金交椅》 - Chen Suyi

== 3rd Awards (1995) ==
- Prize: 張永琛：《隱形恐龍鳥》 - Zhang Yongchen
- Prize: 黃虹堅：《十三歲的深秋》 - Huang Hongjian
- Prize: 張淑美：《老蕃王與小頭目》 - Zhang Shumei
- Prize: 趙映雪：《奔向閃亮的日子》 - Zhao Yingxue
- Prize: 陳素宜：《天才不老媽》 - Chen Suyi
- Prize: 劉臺痕：《護命行動》 - Liu Taihen

== 2nd Awards (1994) ==
- Prize: 馮傑：《飛翔的恐龍蛋》 - Feng Jie
- Prize: 屠佳：《飛奔吧！黃耳朵》 - Tu Jia
- Prize: 胡英音：《安妮的天空．安妮的夢》 - Hu Yingyin
- Prize: 秦文君：《家有小丑》 - Qin Wenjun
- Prize: 陳素燕：《少年曹丕》 - Chen Suyan
- Prize: 陳曙光：《重返家園》 Chen Shuguang

== 1st Awards (1993) ==
- Prize: 劉臺痕：《五十一世紀》 - Liu Taihen
- Prize: 柯錦鋒：《我們的土地》 - Ke Jinfeng
- Prize: 楊美玲、趙映雪：《茵茵的十歲願望》 - Yang Meiling and Hu Yingxue
- Prize: 戎林：《九龍闖三江》 - Rong Lin
