= Hague Club =

The Hague Club is formed by the Chief Executives of 30 major foundations and philanthropic organizations in Europe and corresponding members from the United States, Asia and Australia. It meets once a year to discuss informally the role of philanthropy and management of foundations. Founded in 1971, it claims to be independent of governments and to have no political aims.

== Members ==
The Chief Executives of the following foundations (as of 2012):

- Finnish Cultural Foundation (Finland)
- Esmée Fairbairn Foundation (United Kingdom)
- Robert Bosch Stiftung (Germany)
- Bank of Sweden Tercentenary Foundation (Sweden)
- Chen Yet-Sen Family Foundation (Hong Kong)
- Gebert Rüf Stiftung (Switzerland)
- Prins Bernhard Cultuurfonds (Netherlands)
- Myer Foundation (Australia)
- Compagnia di San Paolo (Italy)
- Oranje Fonds (Netherlands)
- ZEIT-Stiftung (Germany)
- Bernard van Leer Foundation (Netherlands)
- Rockefeller Brothers Fund (United States)
- Jacobs Foundation (Switzerland)
- VolkswagenStiftung (Germany)
- Jenny and Antti Wihuri Foundation (Finland)
- The Leverhulme Trust (United Kingdom)
- Fondazione Adriano Olivetti (Italy)
- New Europe College (Romania)
- Fundacion Instituto de Empresa (Spain)
- Fritz Thyssen Stiftung (Germany)
- Institusjonen Fritt Ord (Norway)
- Velux Foundation (Denmark)
- European Foundation Centre (Belgium)
- Fundación Princesa de Asturias (Spain)
- Stifterverband für die Deutsche Wissenschaft (Germany)
- King Baudouin Foundation (Belgium)
- Nuffield Foundation (United Kingdom)
- Fundação Calouste Gulbenkian (Portugal)
- Wellcome Trust (United Kingdom)
- DOTS Foundation for an Open Society (Latvia)
