= Tang Sulan =

Chinese writer

- 汤素兰
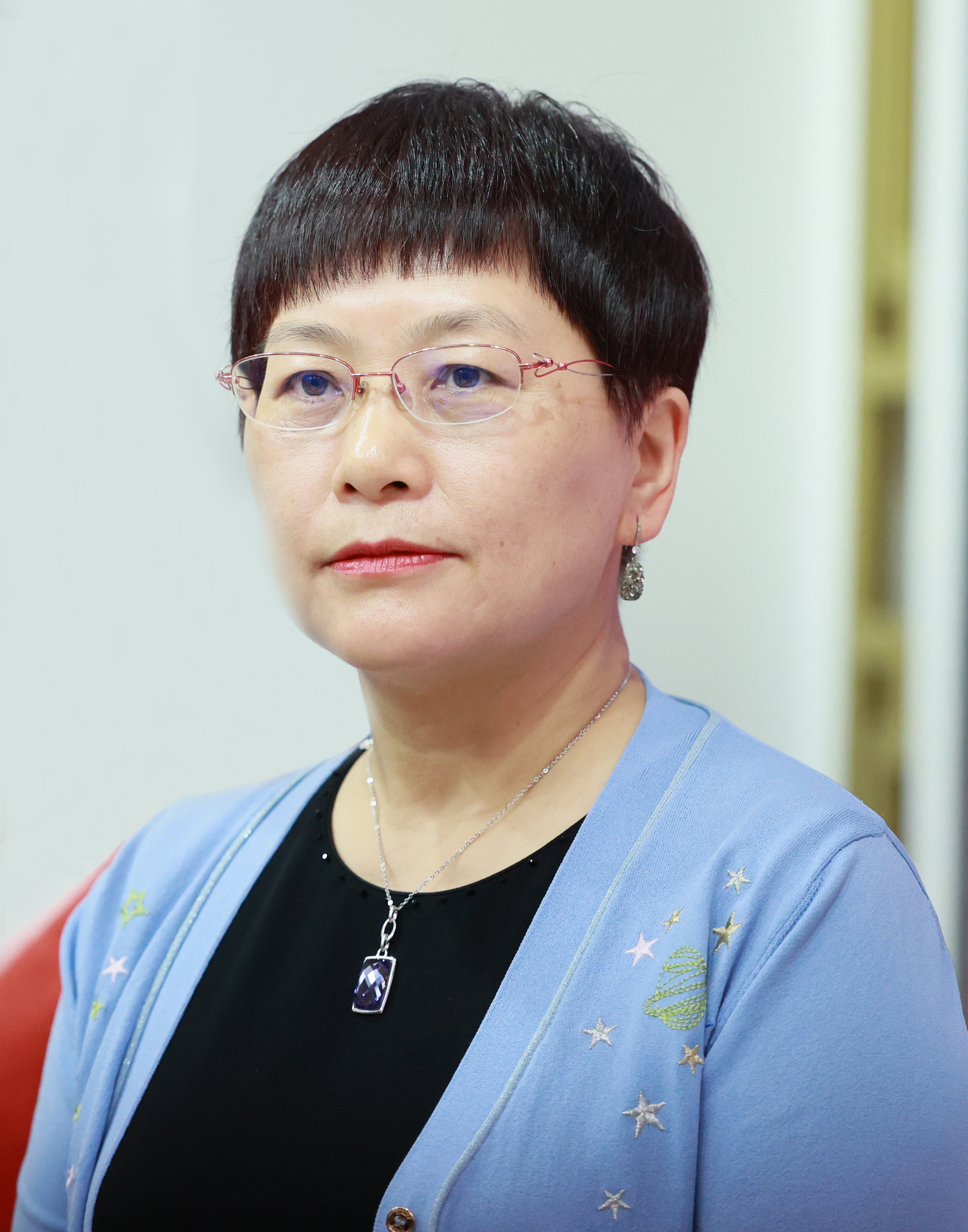
- Tang Sulan at the Frankfurt Book Fair 2023
- Born: January 1965 (age 61); Ningxiang County, Hunan, China
- Education: Hunan Normal University; Zhejiang University
- Occupations: Writer, politician
- Writing career
- Language: Chinese
- Period: 1986–present
- Genres: Novel, prose, poem, fairy tale
- Notable works: Duoduo and Enchanter; Duoduo and Witch; Duoduo and Super Nurse

Tang Sulan (simplified Chinese: 汤素兰; traditional Chinese: 湯素蘭; pinyin: Tāng Sùlán; born January 1965) is a Chinese writer. Although a prolific writer of novels, proses, and poems, she is best known as a children's writer, and for her fairy tales. She is also a professor with the Faculty of Arts at Hunan Normal University.

== Biography ==
Tang was born in Ningxiang County, Hunan in 1965. She graduated from Hunan Normal University in 1985, where she majored in Chinese Literature. In 1988, she was accepted into Zhejiang University and graduated in 1991.

Tang started publish works in 1986. In 1999, she joined the China Writers Association. Later, she joined the China Association for Promoting Democracy. In 2008, she was a member of the 11th National Committee of Chinese People's Political Consultative Conference.

In July 2021, Tang was recruited as a counselor by the Hunan Provincial People's Government, with a term of employment until July 2026.

On 13 March 2023, Tang was chosen as chairwoman of Hunan Writers Association, succeeding Wang Yuewen.

== Works ==
=== Fairy tales ===
- Duoduo and Enchanter (Chinese: 小朵朵和大魔法师)
- Duoduo and Witch (Chinese: 小朵朵与半个巫婆)
- Seeking the Happy Island (Chinese: 寻找快乐岛)
- Attic Spirit (Chinese: 阁楼精灵)
- Walking Fireflies To Home (Chinese: 送萤火虫回家)
- Kid With Big Mouth (Chinese: 大嘴巴小鬼)
- Duoduo and Super Nurse (Chinese: 小朵朵和超级保姆)
- Stupid Wolf and His Parent (Chinese: 笨狼和他的爸爸妈妈)
- School Life of The Stupid Wolf (Chinese: 笨狼的学校生活)
- Stupid Wolf's Trip (Chinese: 笨狼旅行记)
- Stupid Wolf's Stories (Chinese: 笨狼的故事)
- How Beautiful The Small Witch (Chinese: 小巫婆真美丽)
- Horse Live on The Roof (Chinese: 住在摩天大楼顶层的马)
- Bunny and His Friends (Chinese: 小兔子和他的朋友们)
- Girl and Gardenia (Chinese: 女孩和栀子花)
- Great Garden (Chinese: 奇迹花园)

=== Novellas ===
- Zhangyawu's Diary (Chinese: 张牙舞日记)
- The Joy Zhen Shuai (Chinese: 开心果甄帅)
- Super Genius Stupid Bear (Chinese: 超级天才呆头熊)
- Black Love In Mountains (Chinese: 黑色山恋)

=== Proses and poems ===
- Rain in The Field (Chinese: 野雨)
- Sounds of Dream (Chinese: 梦之音)
- What Words Could Never Say (Chinese: 难以诉说)

== Awards ==
- Stupid Wolf's Stories (Chinese: 笨狼的故事) – 7th Xin Yixi Literary Prize (1994), 1st Zhang Tianyi Fairy Tale Prize (1999), Bingxin Children's Literary Prize, 5th National Children's Literary Award (1998)
- Duoduo and Witch (Chinese: 小朵朵与半个巫婆) – 4th National Children's Literary Award (1995)
- Horse Live on The Roof (Chinese: 住在摩天大楼顶层的马) – 7th Chen Bochui Children's Literary Prize (1999)
- Bunny and His Friends (Chinese: 小兔子和他的朋友们) – 5th National Book Award
- Girl and Gardenia (Chinese: 女孩和栀子花) – 2nd Zhang Tianyi Fairy Tale Prize (2001)
- Great Garden (Chinese: 奇迹花园) – 8th National Excellent Children's Literary Award (2010)
- One of the top ten people influencing Hunan (Chinese: 影响湖南十大人物)

Cultural offices
Preceded by Wang Yuewen	Chairwoman of Hunan Writers Association; 2023–present	Incumbent
