= Zheng Chunhua =

Chinese writer (born 1959)

- 郑春华
- Born: 1959 (age 66–67); Chun'an County, Zhejiang, China
- Education: Lu Xun Literary Institute; Nanjing University
- Occupation: Writer
- Children: 2
- Relatives: Zheng Chengyi (father)
- Writing career
- Language: Chinese
- Period: 1980–present
- Genre: Fairy tale
- Subject: Children's literature
- Notable works: Big Head Son and Small Head Dad

Chinese name
- Traditional Chinese: 鄭春華
- Simplified Chinese: 郑春华
Transcriptions
Standard Mandarin
- Hanyu Pinyin: Zhèng Chūnhuá

Zheng Chunhua (Chinese: 郑春华; born 1959) is a Chinese writer best known for writing children's literature. She is noted for her book Big Head Son and Small Head Dad, which was a besteller among children's literature, and the adapted animation with the same name, released in 1995, was also a big hit.

== Biography ==
Zheng was born into a Hui people family, in Chun'an County, Zhejiang in 1959. After high school, she worked in a farm and soon became a nursery governess in 1979, after the Culture Revolution. Zheng started to publish works in 1980. That same year, her poem, Little Bed, won first prize at the Shanghai Youth Poetry Creation Contest. In 1981, she was assigned to Shanghai Adolescence and Children Press as an editor. Her noted book, Big Head Son and Small Head Dad, was published in 1990, and has been adapted for animation with the same name in 1995.

== Works ==
- Big Head Son and Small Head Dad (大头儿子小头爸爸)
- Not Square Not Round (不是方的，不是圆的)
- Adventures of the Postman (邮递员叔叔的奇遇)
- A Family Photo (一张全家福)
- Father Living on the Other Bank (住在对岸的爸爸)
- Kelakela Bed (克拉克拉的床)
- Moon Cakes for Family Get-togethers (团团圆圆吃月饼)
- The Most Delicious Green Dumplings (最好吃的青团)
- Who Is More Formidable (到底谁厉害)
- The Special Boy Ma Mingjia (非常小子马鸣加)
- Rice Porridge Under the Eaves (屋檐下的腊八粥)
- Little Biscuit and Apron Mom (小饼干和围裙妈妈)

== Adaptations ==
One of her works has been adapted for animation:

- Big Head Son and Small Head Dad (1995)

== Awards and commendations ==
- Big Head Son and Small Head Dad – 5th National Book Award, 19th Chen Bochui Children's Literature Award, 2001 Bing Xin Children's Literature Award, and 6th Song Qingling Literature Prize

== Personal life ==
Zheng has two children, a son and a daughter.
