= Feng Zikai Chinese Children's Picture Book Award =

Biannual award in China

The Feng Zikai Chinese Children's Picture Book Award (trad. Chin.: 豐子愷兒童圖畫書獎) is a biannual award aimed at promoting original, quality Chinese children's books and recognising the efforts of authors, illustrators and publishers. The Award is named after one of China's best-known illustrators, Feng Zikai (1898–1975). It is the first international Chinese children's picture book award.

The Award is sponsored by the Chen Yet-Sen Family Foundation, a Hong Kong–based charitable institution, which supports childhood literacy projects. The first awards were made in July 2009 and, thereafter, every other year.

The Award is comparable to the Caldecott Medal, which honours the most distinguished American picture book for children published in the United States each year.

== Background ==
The best children's picture books in the Chinese-speaking world are often translated from foreign languages. As a result, they may not always be relevant to the experiences of Chinese children. The Feng Zikai Award is aimed at addressing the current inadequacy of high quality, original Chinese picture books.

The Award recognises the achievements of writers and illustrators of Chinese children's picture books. By doing so, it hopes to encourage the production and distribution of high quality children's picture books.

Recognising the importance of reading in a child's development, the Feng Zikai Award also aims to promote reading and to help develop a reading culture amongst children in the Chinese-speaking world.

== Prizes ==
The main prize will go to the winner of the "Best Children's Book Award", who will be awarded a cash prize of US$20,000. The organiser will also purchase 3,000 copies of the winning book, which will be distributed amongst schools.

The "Judging Panel's Recommended Illustration Award" and the "Judging Panel's Recommended Writing Award" winners will each receive a cash prize of $10,000.

In addition, the "Outstanding Children's Picture Book Award" will be given to 10 authors who will each win $1,000.

== Prize winners ==
=== The 9th Awards, 2025 ===
Judges: Sandra LEE 李坤珊, LEE Yiman 李一慢, AN Shih-liu 安石榴, PAN Jian 潘坚, HO Yun Tsz 何云姿, Fiona Feng-Hsin LIU 刘凤芯 and FANG Weiping 方卫平.

Outstanding Chinese Children's Picture Book Award (no overall winner)

- "Child Who Taming Rivers" 《驯河童子》by LIAO Xiaoqin 廖小琴 (author) and Asir 阿涩 (illustrator)
- "Where Are You Going, Grandpa Mulati" 《木拉提爷爷,你去哪儿?》, by TANG Yaming 唐亚明 (author) and ZHOU Xiang 周翔 (illustrator)
- "The Playground of Little Jumbo Age" 《小高的游乐场》, by LAM Kin Choi 林建才 (author and illustrator)
- "The Strong Man on the Left Side of the Mountain" 《山左大力士》, by TzeWei YANG 杨子苇 (author and illustrator)
- "Willy's Eyes" 《小威的眼睛》, by WanLin DU 杜宛霖 (author and illustrator)

=== The 8th Awards, 2023 ===
Best Chinese Children's Picture Book Award – winner

- "Mr. Bear's Class Learns to Write 1" 《不一樣的1》 by author Yanan Wu 吳亞男 and illustrator Liu Longsha 柳壟沙

Outstanding Chinese Children's Picture Book Award

- "Secrets at the Zoo" 《動物園的祕密》by Huang Yi-Wen 黃一文 (author and illustrator)
- "The One-sided Painter" 《畫家馬一邊》by Tom Liu 湯姆牛 (author and illustrator)
- "Granny's Sea" 《誰是魔法王?》by Wan Shan Cheung 張韻珊 (author and illustrator)
- "The Life in A Lotus Seed"《一顆蓮子的生命旅程》 by author Ying Ting Chen 陳瑩婷 and illustrator Hua Qing 花青

=== The 7th Awards, 2021 ===
Best Chinese Children's Picture Book Award – winner

- "Sudan's Rhino Horn" 《蘇丹的犀角》 by author Dai Yun 戴芸 and illustrator Li Xingming 李星明

Outstanding Chinese Children's Picture Book Award

- "Happy Birthday" 《生日快樂》by Adeline Ko 高佩聰 (author and illustrator)
- "Button Soldier" 《鈕扣士兵》by Jiu'er 九兒 (author and illustrator)
- "Little Bear, Run" 《小熊，快跑》by author Shi Lei 史雷 and illustrator Ma Penghao 馬鵬浩
- "Dung Beetle's Birthday Present"《糞金龜的生日禮物》 by author Gong Wei Guo 龔衛國 and illustrator Tao Ju Xiang 陶菊香

=== The 6th Awards, 2019 ===
Judges: Sarah Ko, Fang Weiping, Sandra Lee, Hsu Su-hsia, Meilo So, Chen En Li, Ji Zhao Hua

Best Chinese Children's Picture Book Award – winner

- "About the Grandmother's Horse"《外婆家的马》 by Xie Hua 谢华 (author) and Huang Li 黄丽 (illustrator)

Outstanding Chinese Children's Picture Book Award

- "A Maverick Piggy" 《一个特立独行的猪》by Zhang Ning 张宁 (author and illustrator)
- "Under the Same Moon" 《同一个月亮》by Jimmy Liao 几米 (author and illustrator)
- "The Flyaway Tickets" 《车票去哪里了？》by Hsu-Kung Liu 刘旭恭 (author and illustrator)
- "Let's Go to the Zoo, My Dear Brother" 《一起去动物园》 by Lin Po Ting 林柏廷

=== The 5th Awards, 2017 ===
Best Chinese Children's Picture Book Award – winner

- "Where Does Rice Come From?" 《盘中餐》 by Yu Hongcheng 于虹呈(author and illustrator)

Outstanding Chinese Children's Picture Book Award

- "Where is the Hero?" 《杯杯英雄》by Chao-Lun Tsai 蔡兆伦 (author and illustrator)
- "Waiting" 《等待》by Adeline Ko 高佩聪 (author and illustrator)
- "Grandma Lin's Peach Tree" 《林桃奶奶的桃子树》 by Tom Liu 汤姆牛 (author and illustrator)
- "Excursions of Tortoise Family" 《佳作奖》by Zhang Ning 张宁 (author and illustrator)

=== The 4th Awards, 2015 ===
Best Chinese Children's Picture Book Award – winner

- "Kata, Kata, Kata" 《喀噠喀噠喀噠》by Bei Lynn 林小杯 – author and illustrator

Outstanding Chinese Children's Picture Book Award

- "Granny couldn't fall asleep" 《棉婆婆睡不着》by Liao Xiaoqin 廖小琴 (author) and Zhu Chengliang 朱成梁 (illustrator)
- "Tooth, tooth, throw it on the roof" 《牙齿牙齿扔屋顶》by Liu Xun 劉洵 (author and illustrator)
- "The little magpie and the rocky hill" 《小喜鹊和岩石山》by Liu Ching-Yen 刘清彦 (author) and Chao-Lun Tsai 蔡兆伦 (illustrator)
- "The crutch dog" 《拐杖狗》by Lee Ru-Qing 李如青 (author and illustrator)

=== The 3rd Awards, 2013 ===
Best Chinese Children's Picture Book Award – winner

- "I see a bird" 《我看见一只鸟》by Liu Bor-Leh 刘伯乐 – author and illustrator

Outstanding Chinese Children's Picture Book Award

- "The very slow snail"《很慢很慢的蝸牛》 by Chih-Yuan Chen (author and illustrator) 陈致元 (author and illustrator)
- "Ali loves animals" 《阿里愛動物》by Li-Huang Huang 黄丽凰 (author) and Chih-Ming Huang 黄志民 (illustrator)
- "I can't see" 《看不見》by Chao-Lun Tsai 蔡兆伦 (author and illustrator)
- "The scariest day of my life" 《最可怕的一天》 by Tom Liu (Chen-Kuo Liu) 汤姆牛 (author and illustrator)

=== The 2nd Awards, 2011 ===
Judging Panel's Recommended Award

- "Going to the Marketplace"《進城》by Cookie Lin 林秀穗 (author) and Chien-Hung Liao 廖健宏 (illustrator)
- "Door"《門》by Tao Juxiang 陶菊香 (author and illustrator)
- "It's Raining!"《下雨了！》by Tom Liu (Chen-Kuo Liu) 汤姆牛 (author and illustrator)
- "Infatuated with Peking Opera"《迷戲》by Yao Hong (author and illustrator) 姚红 (author and illustrator)
- "The Frog and the Boy" 《青蛙與男孩》by Xiao Mao 萧袤 (author), Chen Wei (illustrator) 陈伟 (illustrator) and Huang Xiaomin (illustrator) 黃小敏 (illustrator)

=== The 1st Awards, 2009 ===
Best Chinese Children's Picture Book Award

- "A New Year's Reunion" by Yu Liqiong 余丽琼 (author) and Zhu Chengliang 朱成梁 (illustrator)

This inaugural winner was translated into English and published by Candlewick (US) and Walker Books (UK). In 2011 it was selected as one of the New York Times Book Review's 10 Best Illustrated Books of the Year.

Judging Panel's Recommended Writing Award

- The King of Hide and Seek《躲貓貓大王》 by Zhang Xiaoling (author) 张晓玲 (author) and Pan Jian 潘坚 (illustrator)
- The Day Vegetables Became Goblins《一園青菜成了精》by Zhou Xiang (author and illustrator) 周翔 (author and illustrator)

Outstanding Children's Picture Book Award

- "The Morning Market at Lotus Town"《荷花鎮的早市》by Zhou Xiang (author and illustrator) 周翔 (author and illustrator)
- "Me and My Bike"《我和我的腳踏車》by Ye Ande 叶安德 (author and illustrator)
- "An's Seeds" 《安的種子》by Wang Zaozao 王早早 (author) and Huang Li (illustrator) 黄丽 (illustrator)
- "I've Become a Fire Breathing Dragon!"《我變成一隻噴火龍了!》by Laima (author and illustrator) 賴馬 (author and illustrator)
- "Now Do You Know Who I Am?"《現在，你知道我是誰了嗎?》by Laima (author and illustrator) 賴馬 (author and illustrator)
- "A Wednesday Afternoon, Chasing Tadpoles"《星期三下午，捉‧蝌‧蚪》An Shih-liu 安石榴 (author and illustrator)
- "I Want to Be Different"《想要不一樣》by Tong Jia 童嘉 (author and illustrator)
- "On the Pond, Under the Pond"《池上池下》by Chiu Chen-tsung 邱承宗 (author and illustrator)
- "Xi Xi"《西西》by Xiao Mao 萧袤 (author), Li Chunmiao 李春苗 (illustrator) and Zhang Yanhong 张彦红 (illustrator)
