= Mitsumasa Anno =

Japanese children's illustrator and writer (1926–2020)

Mitsumasa Anno (安野 光雅)
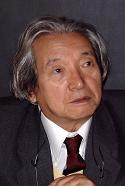
- Anno in 2000
- Born: March 20, 1926; Tsuwano, Japan
- Died: December 24, 2020 (aged 94)
- Education: Yamaguchi Teacher Training College
- Occupations: Illustrator, writer
- Spouse: Midori
- Children: 2
- Writing career
- Period: 1968–2020
- Genre: Children's picture books
- Notable awards: Hans Christian Andersen Award; 1984

Mitsumasa Anno (安野 光雅, Anno Mitsumasa; 20 March 1926 – 24 December 2020) was a Japanese illustrator and writer of children's books, known best for picture books with few or no words. He received the international Hans Christian Andersen Medal in 1984 for his "lasting contribution to children's literature."

== Life ==
Anno was born in 1926 in Tsuwano, a small town in Shimane Prefecture, Japan where he grew up. As a student at a regional high school, he studied art, drawing, and the writings of Hermann Hesse.

During World War II, Anno was drafted into the Japanese army. After the war, Anno earned a degree from the Yamaguchi Teacher Training College (a predecessor of Yamaguchi University) in 1948. He taught mathematics for ten years in an elementary school in Tokyo before beginning a career illustrating children's books.

Anno lived in Japan with his wife, Midori. They had two children, Masaichiro and Seiko. He died on 24 December 2020 from cirrhosis of the liver.

== Art ==
Anno was best known for wordless picture books featuring small, detailed figures. In the "Journey" books, a tiny character travels through a nation's landscape, densely populated with pictures referencing that country's art, literature, culture, and history. Anno's illustrations are often in pen and ink and watercolor, and occasionally incorporate collage and woodcuts. They are intricately detailed, showing a sense of humor as well as an interest in science, mathematics, and foreign cultures. They frequently incorporate subtle jokes and references. Anno's style has been compared to that of M. C. Escher.

A collection of his work is exhibited in Kyoto at "The House in the Forest: Mitsumasa Anno Museum."

== Awards ==
The biennial Hans Christian Andersen Award conferred by the International Board on Books for Young People is the highest recognition available to a writer or illustrator of children's books. Anno received the illustration award in 1984.

- Chicago Tribune Honor Award (1970)
- The Minister of Education's Art Encouragement Prize for New Artists (1974)
- Kate Greenaway Medal, commended runner-up (1974), Anno's Alphabet (Note: Today there are usually eight books on the Greenaway Medal shortlist. According to CCSU, some runners-up were Commended (from 1959) or Highly Commended (from 1974). There were 99 distinctions of both kinds in 44 years, including two for 1974.)
- Brooklyn Museum of Art Award (1975)
- Boston Globe–Horn Book Award, Picture Book (1975), Anno's Alphabet
- BG–HB Honor, Picture Book (1977), Anno's Counting Book
- Boston Globe–Horn Book Award, Picture Book (1978), Anno's Journey
- BIB Golden Apple Award (1979)
- Graphic Award, Bologna Children's Book Fair (1980)
- Person of Cultural Merit (2012)

== Selected works ==
- Mysterious Pictures (1968)
- Jeux de construction (1970)
- Topsy Turvies (1970)
- Upside Downers (1971)
- Zwergenspuk (1972)
- Dr. Anno's Magical Midnight Circus (1972)
- Anno's Alphabet (1974)
- Anno's Counting Book (1975)
- Anno's Journey (1977)
- Anno's Animals (1979)
- Anno's Italy (1979)
- The Unique World of Mitsumasa Anno: Selected Works, 1968-1977 (London: Bodley Head, New York: Philomel, 1980)
- Anno's Magical ABC (1981)
- Anno's Counting House (1982)
- Anno's Britain (1982)
- Anno's USA (1983)
- Anno's Flea Market (1984)
- Anno's Three Little Pigs (1985)
- The King's Flower (1986)
- All in a Day (1986)
- Anno's Sundial (1987)
- Anno's Upside Downers (1988)
- In Shadowland (1988)
- Anno's Peekaboo (1988)
- Anno's Faces (1989)
- Anno's Aesop: A Book of Fables (1989)
- Chyi Miaw Gwo (1990)
- Anno's Medieval World (1990)
- Anno's Masks (1990)
- The Animals (1992)
- Anno's Hat Tricks (1993)
- Anno's Twice Told Tale (1993)
- Anno's Magic Seeds (1995)
- Anno's Journey (1997)
- Anno's Math Games (1997)
- Anno's Math Games 2 (1997)
- Anno's Math Games 3 (1997)
- Anno's Mysterious Multiplying Jar (1999)
- The Art Of Mitsumasa Anno: Bridging Cultures (with Ann Beneduce) (2003)
- Bungotai for Youths (2003)
- Anno's Spain (2004)

=== As illustrator only ===
- Socrates and the Three Little Pigs, by Tsuyoshi Mori (1986)
- The Magic Pocket: Selected Poems, poems by Michio Mado (1998)
