= Liu Xianping =

Chinese writer (1938–2022)

Liu Xianping 刘先平 (1938 – 10 January 2022) was a Chinese writer, best known for writing ecological literature (green literature), and children's books. He was known as the Father of Modern Nature Writing in China.

== Life and career ==
Liu was born in Feidong, Anhui Province, China, in 1938. He graduated from the Chinese Department of Zhejiang University in 1961. He was a member of the China Writers Association, the Children's Literature Committee, and various government organisations in Anhui province. He worked for many years as a teacher, and as editor of Anhui Literature (《安徽文学》). His first publications were in 1957, initially poetry, essays and theory, but stopped writing in 1963. He resumed writing in 1978, concentrating on nature writing. He was admitted to the China Writers Association in 1982. He travelled extensively in China, spending long periods of time in the wilds, e.g. in Xinjiang, Yunnan, Tibet and other areas. He died in Hefei on 10 January 2022, at the age of 84.

== Honours and awards ==
Liu was honoured with numerous national level honours - and in 1992 the State Council of China awarded him the title of "Expert who has made an outstanding contribution". He received a National Outstanding Children's Literature Award on two occasions. He was on the IBBY Honour List 2008, and was nominated for the Hans Christian Andersen Award.

== Publications ==
The following is a selection of Liu's works:

- 《我的山野朋友：刘先平大自然探险奇遇》 My friends in the wild : Liu Xianping's wonderful adventure in the world of nature (bilingual edition, 2007)
- 《千鸟谷追踪》 A voyage of discovery through the valley of a thousand birds (in English, 2007)
- 《走进帕米尔高原：穿越柴达木盆地》 [Going into the Pamirs: Through the Qaidam Basin] (2008)
- Pere David's deer king emerges in combat (in English, 2010)
- Golden monkeys fight vultures (in English, 2010)
- The love story of black muntjacs (in English, 2010)
- The mysterious Francois's leaf monkeys (in English, 2010)
- 《和黑野猴对话》 [Dialogue with langurs]
- 《寻找大树杜鹃王》 [Finding the king of the rhododendron trees]
- 《云海探奇》 [The adventure in the sea of clouds]
- 《大熊猫传奇》 [The story of the giant panda]
