= Shen Shixi =

Chinese writer

- 沈石溪
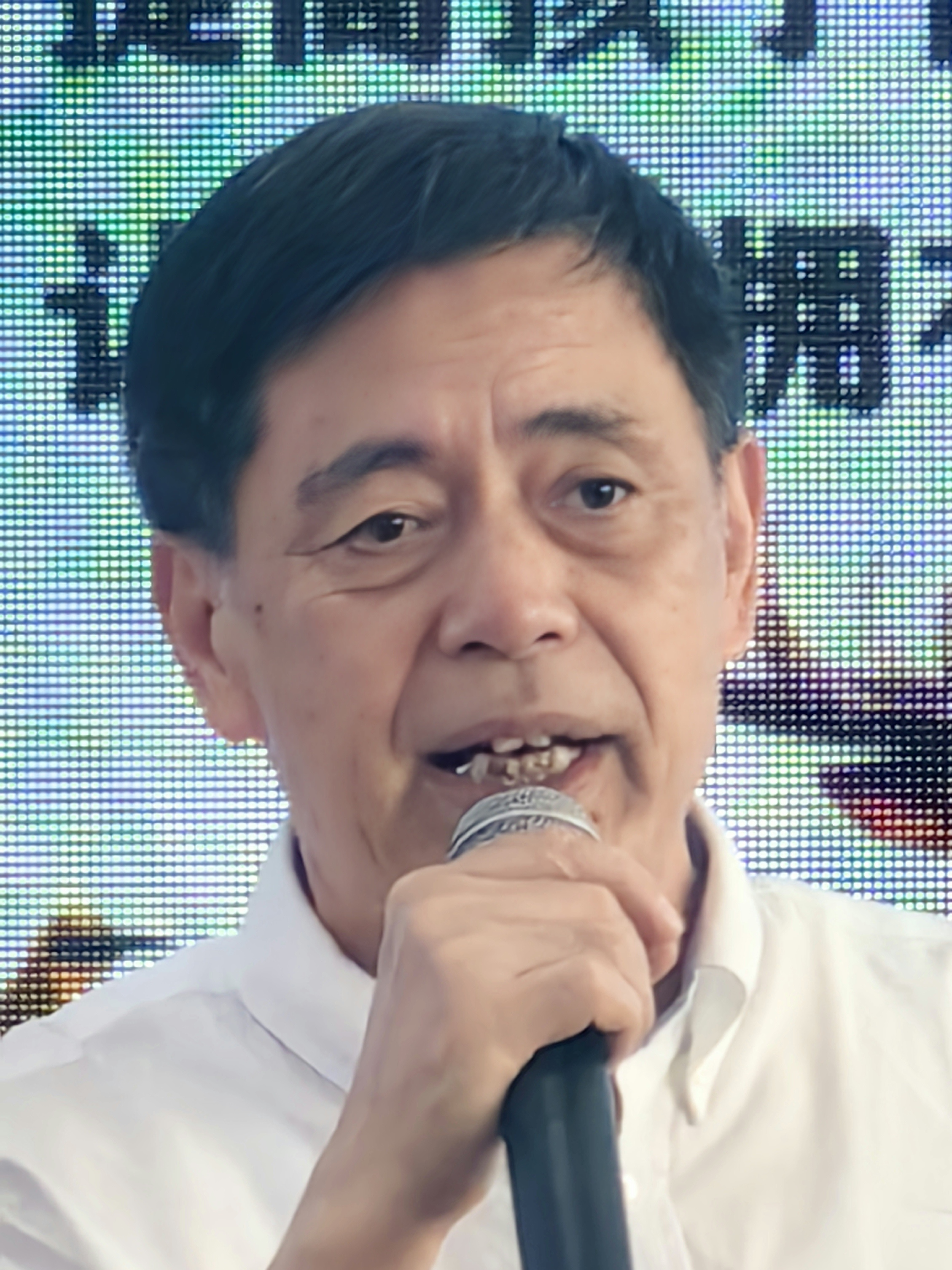
- Shen in 2025
- Born: Shen Yiming; October 1951 (age 74); Shanghai, China
- Education: People's Liberation Army Academy of Art
- Occupation: Novelist
- Writing career
- Language: Chinese
- Period: 1979–present
- Genres: Novel, short stories
- Subject: Children's literature
- Notable work: Wolf King Dream

Chinese name
- Chinese: 沈石溪
Transcriptions
Standard Mandarin
- Hanyu Pinyin: Shěn Shíxī

Shen Yiming
- Traditional Chinese: 沈一鳴
- Simplified Chinese: 沈一鸣
Transcriptions
Standard Mandarin
- Hanyu Pinyin: Shěn Yīmíng

Shen Shixi (Chinese: 沈石溪; pinyin: Shěn Shíxī; born October 1952), also known as Shen Yiming (沈一鸣; Shěn Yīmíng), is a children's author in China. He is best known for his animal stories, and is known as the "King of Animal Stories". In 2015 he was the 9th highest earning author, earning royalties of 12 million RMB.

== Life ==
Shen Shixi was born in Shanghai in October 1952. In 1968 he was sent to a village of the Dai people in Xishuangbanna. In 1975 he joined the army, and was Head of the Propaganda Department. He became a member of the Yunnan Writers Association in 1982, and the China Writers Association in 1985. In 1992 he moved to creative office of the Chengdu Military Region.

== Writing ==
Shen is best known for his animal stories, and has been described as the "King of Animal Stories".

== Awards and honours ==
Winner of the National Outstanding Children's Literature Award, and the Chen Bochui Children's Literature Award.

== Books ==
- 猎狐
- 第七条猎狗
- 再被狐狸骗一次
- 狼王梦 - Wolf King Dream
- 白象家族
- 斑羚飞渡
- 最后一头战象
- 一只猎雕的遭遇
- 和乌鸦做邻居
- 野犬女皇
- 鸟奴
- 混血豺王
- 红豺 - Jackal and Wolf, translated by Helen Wang (Egmont, 2012)
- When Mu Meets Min, illustrated by Shen Yuanyuan
