= Qin Wenjun =

Children's literature author (born 1954)

- 秦文君
- Born: 1954 (age 71–72); Shanghai, China
- Education: East China Normal University
- Occupation: Author
- Writing career
- Language: Chinese
- Genre: Children's literature
- Notable awards: Mondello Prize (1996); National Outstanding Children’s Literature Award (China) (1997); Bing Xin Children’s Literature Award (1998)

Qin Wenjun (秦文君; born 1954) is an author of children's literature. She writes in Chinese.

Qin Wenjun was born in Shanghai in 1954. In 1971, as one of the educated youth sent to work in the rural China, Qin was sent to a forested area in Daxing'an Ling Prefecture, Heilongjiang province, in north-east China. Her first publication was a novella "Shining Fireflies" (《闪亮的萤火虫》) in 1981. In 1984 she graduated from East China Normal University's Department of language and literature, and then worked as an editor at the Shanghai Children's Press (少年儿童出版社). She is now Director-General of the Shanghai Board on Books for Young People (SHBBY, part of IBBY), Vice President of the Shanghai Writers Association, and a National Committee Member of the China Writers Association. Qin's novels have been adapted for films and TV series, and have attained China's highest honours for film and TV series. Her works have been translated into English, Dutch, Japanese, Korean, and other languages.

In the 1990s, Qin Wenjun also explored the use of humor in depicting a modern teenage subjectivity in Schoolboy Jia Li (1993), which has since sold over a million copies. Speaking at an IBBY conference in 2006, Qin Wenjun detailed what she perceived as the key qualities of children's literature and in doing so defined the context in which contemporary Chinese children's literature represents subjectivity. … Based on her understanding of the reality of Chinese children's lives, Qin has made an important contribution to defending and protecting the value of both "children" and "literature". … She thus goes further than rejecting the 1970s production of subjectivity through dogmatic education and her original path has placed the literature on a solid foundation."

— John Stephens (2012)

While drawing on deep Chinese traditions, she has also laid new foundations for young readers.

== Awards and honours (selection) ==
- 2017 Nominated for the 2018 Hans Christian Andersen Award.
- 2016 My Marble-Hearted Father won a Best Literary Work Award, at the 2016 Chen Bochui Children's Literature Awards
- 2002 Shortlisted for the Hans Christian Andersen Award
- 1999 Shortlisted for the Astrid Lindgren Memorial Award
- 1998 《四弟的绿庄园》 won the Bing Xin Children's Literature Award (冰心儿童文学奖)
- 1997 《男生贾里》Jia Li won 1st prize in the National Outstanding Children's Literature Award (China) (全国优秀少儿读物一等奖)
- 1997 《男生贾里》Jia Li awarded the China Writers Association Children's Literature Award (中国作家协会儿童文学奖)
- 1997 《男生贾里》Jia Li awarded the Shanghai City 3rd Children's Literature Award (上海市第三届文学艺术奖)
- 1997 《宝贝当家》 won the National (全国五个一工程奖)
- 1996 Won the Mondello Prize Special Prize
- 1996 《家有小丑》 won the Taiwan Nine Songs Children's Literature Award (台湾九歌儿童文学奖)
- 1995 《秦文君中篇儿童小说选》 won the Taiwan Yang Huan Children's Literature Award (台湾杨唤儿童文学奖)

== Books (selection) ==
Qin Wenjun has written over 50 books. The following translated titles are approximate:

- 《我是花木兰》I am Hua Mulan, illustrated by Yu Rong (Reycraft Books, 2019)
- 《会跳舞的向日葵》 translated into English as Aroma's Little Garden by Tony Blishen (2016)
- 《天棠街3号》 translated into English as 3 Tian Tang Street by Wu Xiaozhen
- Curly the Black Goat, Hoopy the White Goat
- 《大狗喀啦克拉的公寓》 Smiling Kalakela
- Jia Li at Junior High (English translation by Belinda Yun-ying Louie and Douglas Heung Louie, 1997) OCLC 55612582
- 《男生贾里全传》 The Complete Story of Jia Li
- 《一个女孩的心灵史》 The Mind of a Girl
- 《逃逃》 Taotao
- 《调皮的日子》
- 《女生贾梅全传》
- 《小丫林晓梅》
- 《宝贝当家》
- 《小香咕系列》
- Girl at Sixteen

== See also ==
- Interview with Shanghai Daily, 28 December 2014.
- Qin Wenjun as a speaker at the Asian Festival of Children's Content, Singapore, 2015.
- Qin Wenjun - biography and nomination for prize
- Evaluating the work of Qin Wenjun, in Reading the World's Stories: An Annotated Bibliography of International Youth Literature edited by Annette Y. Goldsmith, Theo Heras, and Susan Corapi (Rowman & Littlefield, 11 Aug 2016), p. 17.
- "Context and contradiction in translating Aroma's Little Garden, by Qin Wenjun" - by Tony Blishen.
