= Chen Yet-Sen Family Foundation =

Hong Kong-administered charitable institution

The Chen Yet-Sen Family Foundation (CYSFF) is a Hong Kong-administered charitable institution established in 2003 by the Chen family, with a dual focus on childhood literacy and vision correction. The CYSFF supports projects across the world, including Mainland China, Hong Kong and the UK, and is currently funding research trials in Mainland China, India, Zimbabwe, Vietnam and Bangladesh.

== Concept ==
Since its inception, the Chen Yet-Sen Family Foundation has funded 208 programmes, including 111 for child literacy, 71 for experiential learning, and six community education initiatives for Hong Kong's low-income ethnic minority communities.

== Notable projects ==
Childhood literacy projects supported by the foundation include:

- Bring Me a Book Hong Kong (BMABHK), which provides bookcase libraries with quality children's books and read aloud training to parents and teachers in Hong Kong. Since 2006, Bring Me a Book Hong Kong has installed over 500 bookcase libraries, provided over 180,000 children with easy access to quality books and engaged over 30,000 parents and educators in training programmes.
- The Feng Zikai Chinese Children's Picture Book Award is an international competition which encourages original Chinese children's picture book writers and illustrators to submit their work. It aims to promote the importance of early childhood literacy and to encourage the growth of children's picture books in Greater China and throughout the global Chinese diaspora.
- The Stone Soup Happy Reading Alliance (SSHRA) focuses on instilling China's youth with a love of reading, stressing that schools should offer children a wide variety of books, scheduled reading time, and engaged teaching staff who share a passion for reading. As of 2020, 40 schools are part of the Stone Soup Happy Reading Alliance in Anhui, China.
- The Jing-Sen Children's Happy Reading Fund, which focuses on expanding the Foundation's philanthropic work on childhood literacy in Mainland China, was launched in 2024 with support from the Shanghai Soong Ching Ling Foundation.

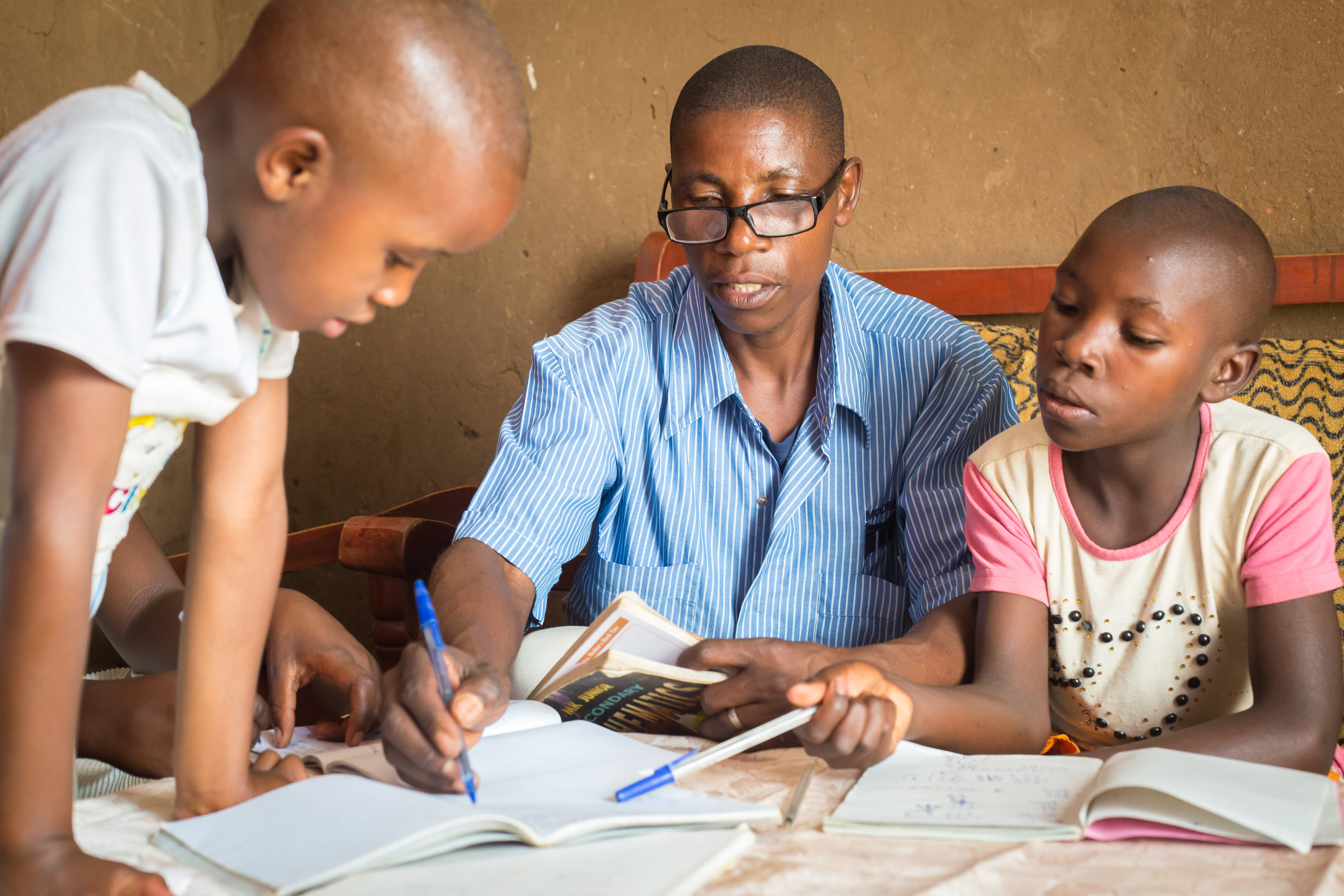
A key goal of the ENGINE research project is to enhance learning among the millions of African children with hyperopia.

Vision correction and eyecare projects include:

- Vision for a Nation (VFAN), which led to the provision of free screening and treatment from nurses in basic local clinics in Rwanda, making it the first developing country in the world to provide affordable eye care for all.
- Clearly, a campaign to educate the public and world leaders about the scale and implications of the global problem of poor vision, which led to the founding of the UN Friends of Vision group. In July 2021, the UN unanimously passed a resolution pledging universal access to eyecare by 2030. Ambassador Rabab Fatima of Bangladesh introduced the legislation on behalf of the Friends of Vision group.
- The ENGINE trials, co-funded by The CYSFF and the Wellcome Trust, which is a five-year research project exploring the connection between vision care and development.
- DRIVE (Development and Research for International Vision correction and Equity), which is a combination of eleven research trials co-funded by The CYSFF, the Wellcome Trust, USAID, The MOH Foundation and Medical Research Council (UK).

== See also ==
- Venture philanthropy
- Literacy
