= Huang Beijia =

Chinese writer

Huang Beijia (Chinese: 黄蓓佳; born 1955) is a Chinese writer of fiction for adults and younger readers.

== Biography ==
Huang Beijia was born in 1955, in Rugao, Jiangsu Province, China. She started writing in 1972 and her first works were published in 1973, focusing on the lives and emotions of intellectuals, at university and in society. Many of her earlier works feature female students, navigating emotional relationships, and attitudes towards Chinese masculinity. Representative works include Carnival Every Night, Midnight Cocktail and Century Romance. She has subsequently become a renowned author for children and younger readers, and was China's nominated author for the 2020 Hans Christian Andersen Award.

Huang graduated from the Chinese Literature department, Peking University. She holds a post of Foreign Affairs Office of Jiangsu Province. She is also Director and Vice-chairman of the Writers Association of Jiangsu Province. She has been a member of the Chinese Writers Association since 1984.

== Selected publications (in English) ==
- I Want To Be Good, tr. Nicky Harman (New Classic Press, 2021. ISBN 978-1912553853) [我要做好孩子]
- Flight of the Bumblebee, tr. Nicky Harman (Balestier Press, 2022. ISBN 978-1913891343) [野蜂飞舞]
