= Bing Xin Children's Literature Award =

Award

The Bing Xin Children's Literary Award (Bing Xin ertong wenxue xinzuo jiang 冰心儿童文学新作奖) is named after the Chinese writer Bing Xin, whose work has made her a key figure in 20th-century Chinese literature. Bing Xin co-founded the award with authors Ge Cuilin and Han Suyin in 1990. It is an annual award intended to "honor the creativity of Chinese Children's literature and in addition to discovering and fostering new authors, supporting and encouraging outstanding children's literature and publishing...".

Bing Xin's daughter Wu Qing continues to be involved with the Bing Xin Children's Literature Award.
