= Vienna, Österreichischen Nationalbibliothek, MS 5203 =

15th-century astronomical manuscript

Vienna ÖNB 5203
- Vienna
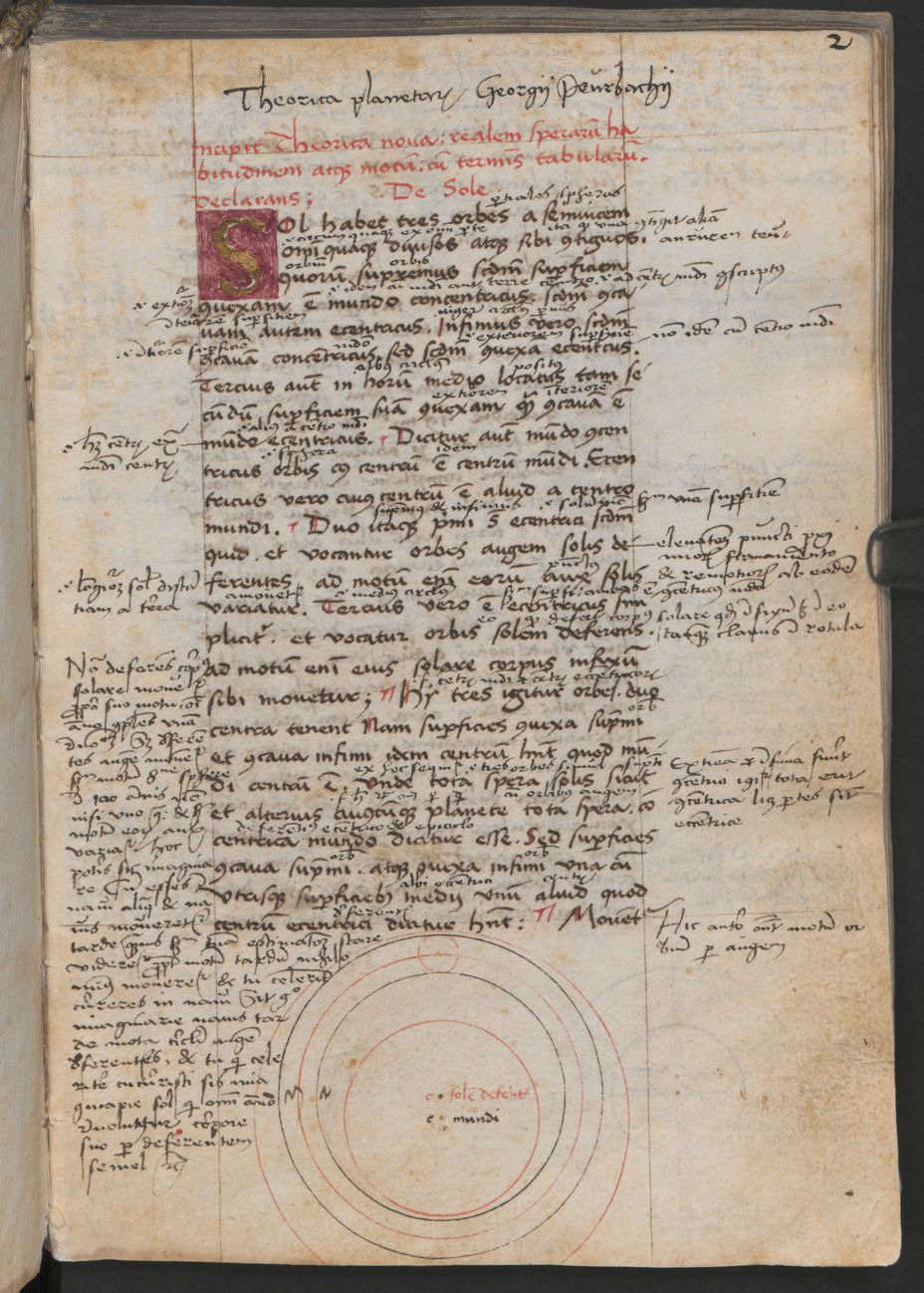
- Type: Calculation book
- Date: c. 1454–1462
- Language: Latin
- Material: Paper
- Size: 210 x 146 mm
- Format: 182 folios (including blank pages)

Vienna ÖNB 5203 is a fifteenth-century astronomical multiple-text (and multi-graphical), miscellany manuscript conserved at the Austrian National Library (Österreichischen Nationalbibliothek). One of the main features of this codex is that it has been largely copied by the hand of Regiomontanus, a famous German mathematician, astrologer and astronomer of the fifteenth century. Apart from Regiomontanus’ autograph, Vienna ÖNB 5203 contains examples of two other scribal hands, one of which belongs to Georg von Peurbach, who was as well an astronomer, mathematician and instrument maker of Austrian origin. The manuscript also contains a number of Peurbach's works, including his most famous one – Theoricae Novae Planetarum, a re-elaboration of Ptolemaic astronomy theories in a more comprehensive way. Other treatises in Vienna ÖNB 5203 touch upon a great variety of subjects, including astronomy, astrology, music, mathematics and physics.

== History and palaeography ==
Vienna ÖNB 5203 was composed in between 1454 and 1462, probably at the University of Vienna, by Regiomontanus. The only parts of the manuscripts not copied by Regiomontanus are folios 67-69 and 88–92, autograph to Georg von Peurbach, and folios from 79 to 86, belonging to the third anonymous scribe. These anonymous folios contain an anonymous canon starting with “Sinum totum ad sinum arcum ecliptice ab aliquo puncto...”. It is not annotated, in comparison to the rest of the manuscript, but is accompanied by a few diagrams (in addition, there are a few blank spaces, suggesting that more diagrams were initially planned to be added).

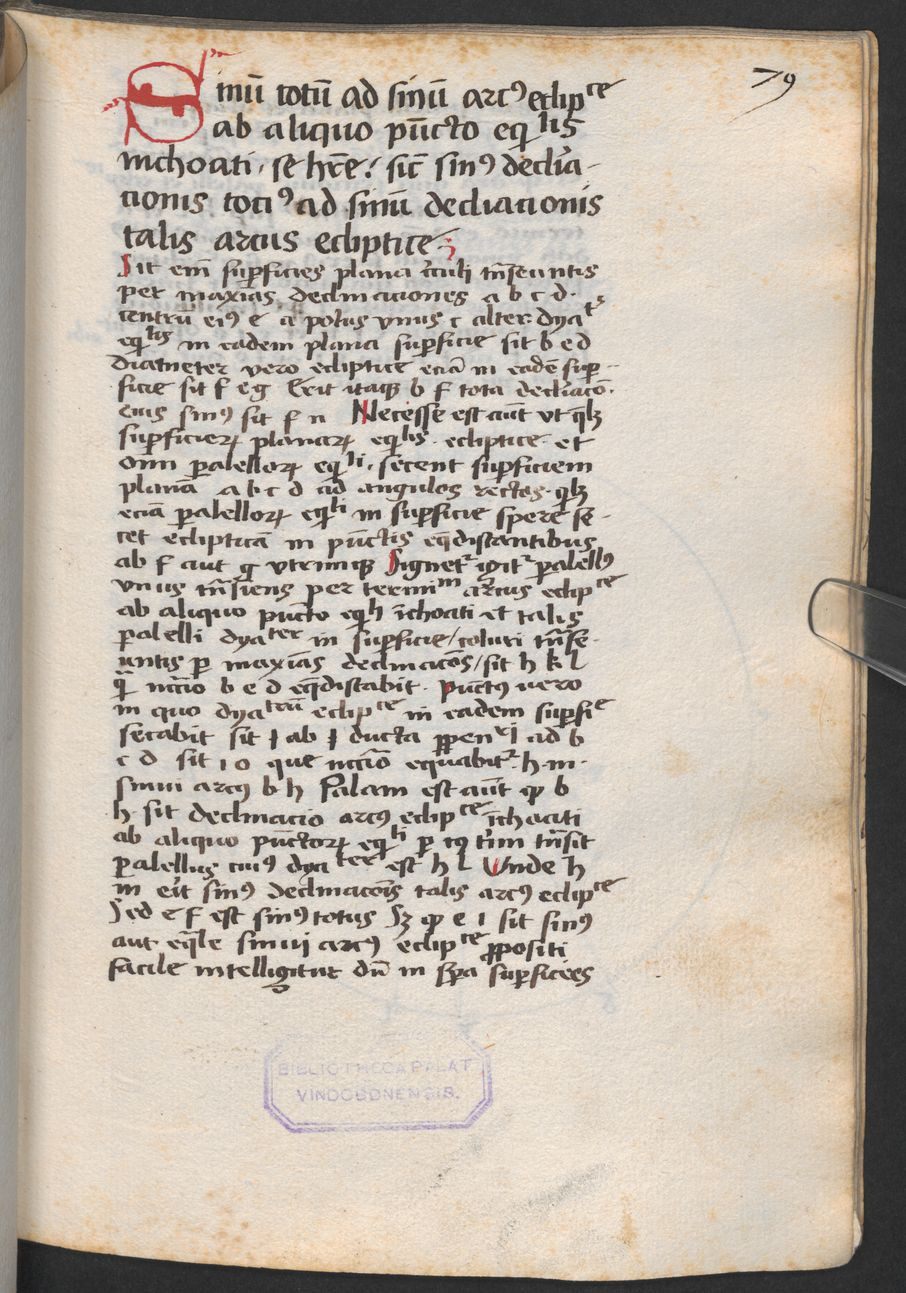
79r, written by the third scribe, Sinum totum ad sinum arcum ecliptice ab aliquo puncto...

After Regiomontanus’ death in 1476, his entire library, which, apart from the books, included many astronomical instruments, has passed into ownership of his collaborator from Nuremberg, Bernhard Walther (1430–1504). In the early and mid-sixteenth century the library of Regiomontanus, including the manuscript Vienna ÖNB 5203, has been attracting attention of the intellectuals. One of such scholars was Johannes Schöner (1477–1547), a mathematician from the Nuremberg college who has foliated Vienna ÖNB 5203, has added titles to many treatises throughout the manuscript, as well as the list of content, and has entitled the codex “Regiomontanus’ calculation notebook”. The composition and binding of the manuscript has remained preserved ever since.

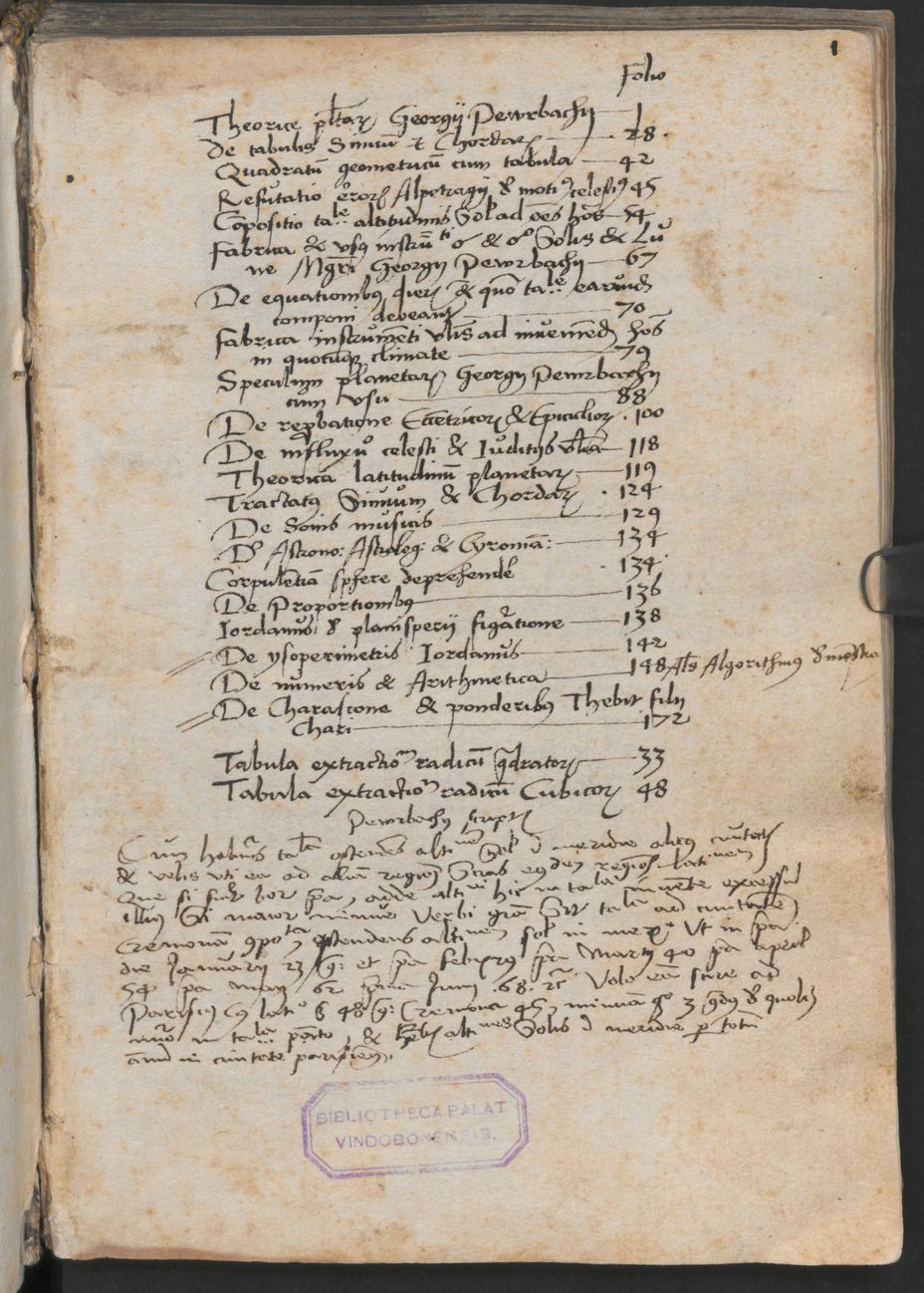
1r, Table of contents

At some point of time the manuscript was also owned by Philipp Eduard Fugger (1546–1618).

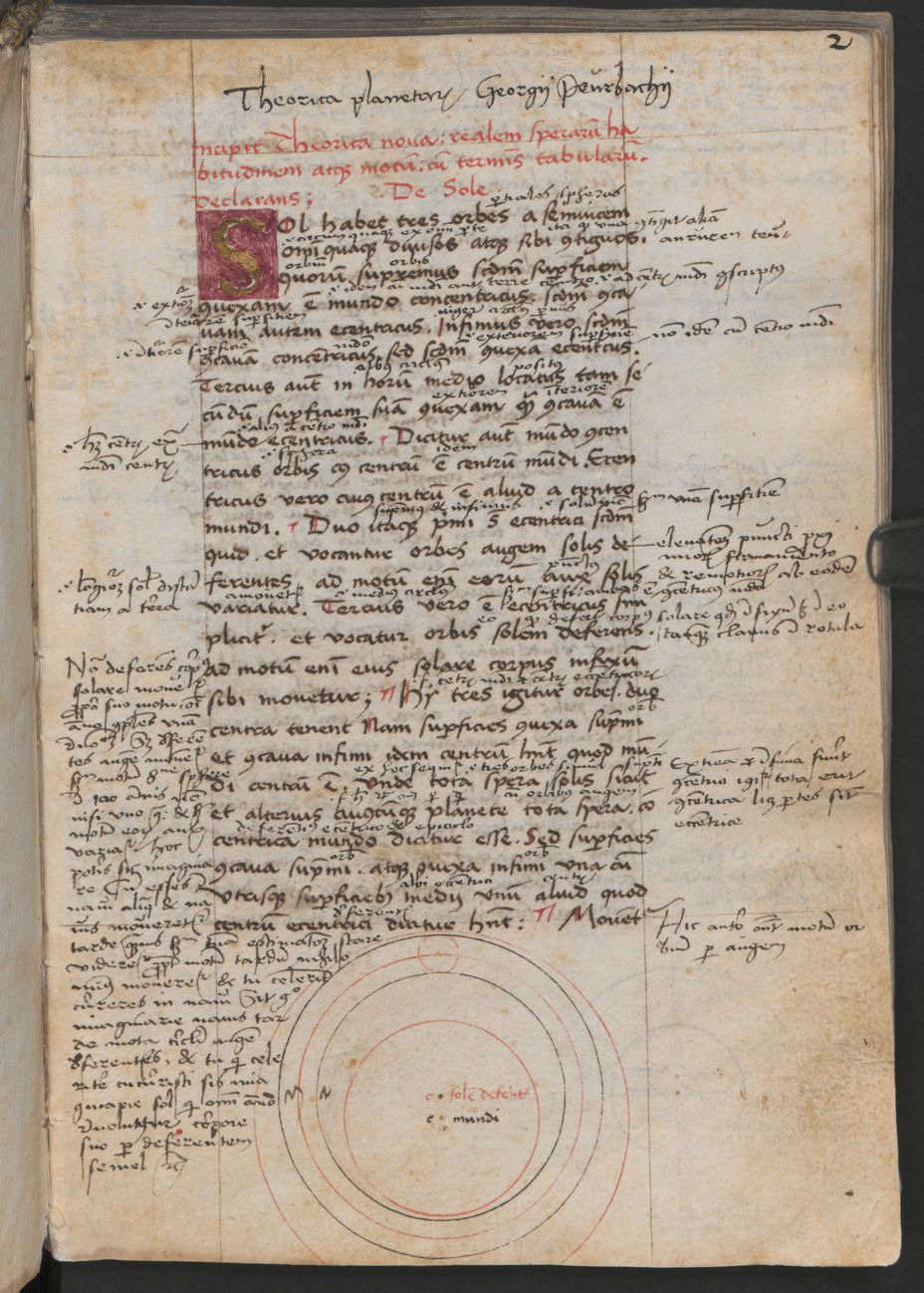
Fol.2r copied by Regiomontanus, Theoricae novae planetarum

=== Regiomontanus ===
Regiomontanus (Johannes Müller von Königsberg) was a German astrologer, astronomer and mathematician of the fifteenth century. He received his education at the University of Leipzig, followed by studies in Vienna, where the manuscript Vienna ÖNB 5203 has been most likely composed. Regiomontanus was a pupil of Georg von Peurbach, whose works are found amongst the content of the manuscript and who has copied a part of text with his own hand. Regiomontanus contributed largely to publishing the printed edition of Peurbach's Theoricae Novae Planetarum after the death of his teacher. Apart from copying most of the Vienna ÖNB 5203, Regiomontanus has left vast marginal annotations in the manuscript. These notes are of particular interest, as they give an opportunity for tracing both the manuscript production and Regiomontanus’ apprehension of the works of his predecessors and contemporaries.

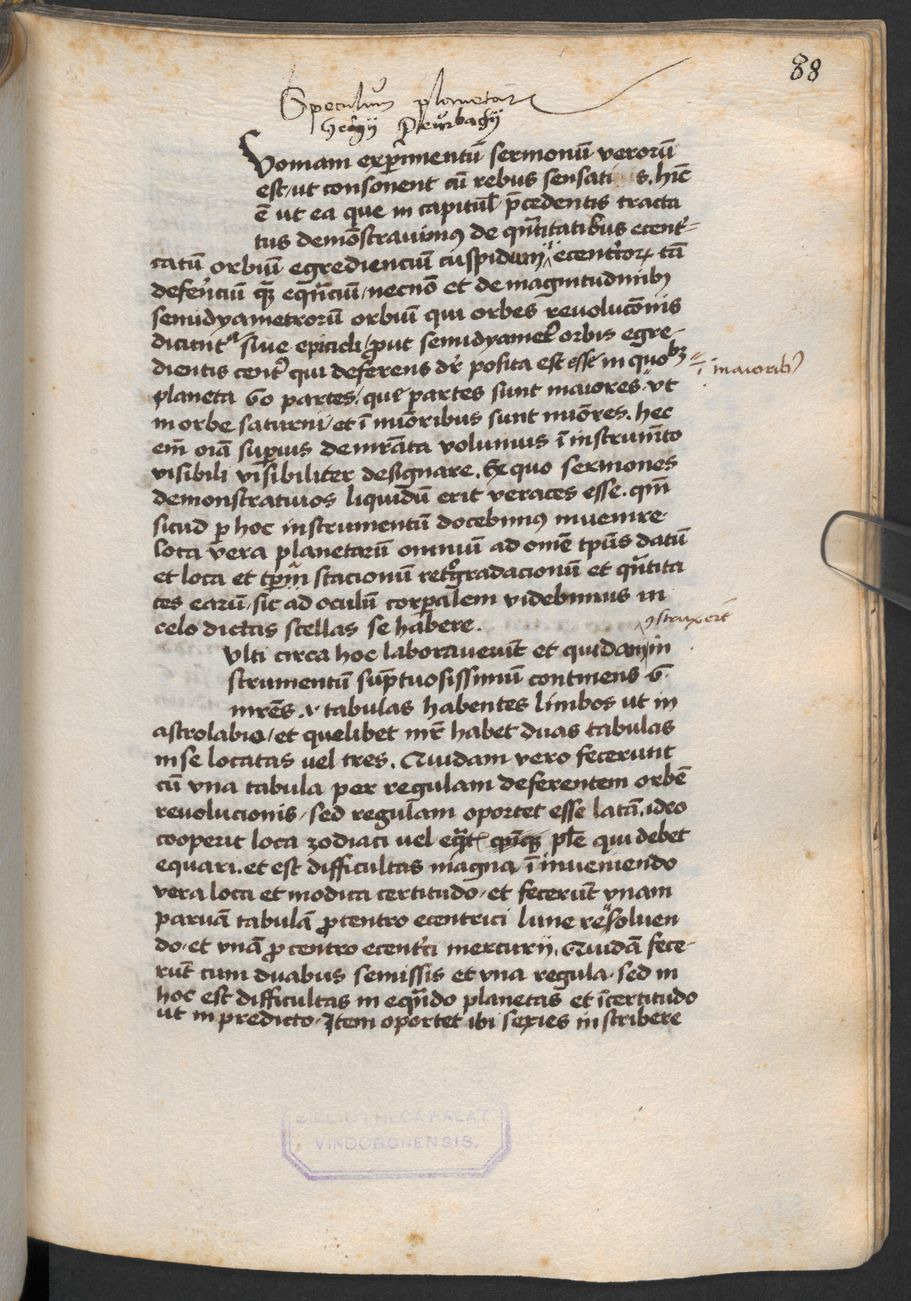
88r written by Peurbach, Speculum planetarum

=== Georg von Peurbach ===
Georg von Peurbach (variants of the name: Purbach, Peuerbach, Purbachius) was an Austrian astronomer, mathematician and instrument maker of the mid-fifteenth century. His most famous astronomical work Theoricae Novae Planetarum, which has later transitioned into print thanks to Regiomontanus. This work is the opening treatise of Vienna ÖNB 5203. Even though the manuscript contains Peurbach's autographs, this particular work is copied by Regiomontanus. The works copied by Peurbach include his treatise Fabrica et usus instrumenti pro veris coniunctionibus et oppositionibus Solis et Lune (Cum animadvertissem quoddam instrumentum pro veris coniunctionibus facile reperiendis...) on folios 67r-69r, as well as his Speculum planetarum (Quoniam experimentum sermonum verorum est ut consonent…) on folios 88r-92r.

== Intellectual content ==
=== Theoricae Novae Planetarum ===
Georg Peurbach's Theoricae Novae Planetarum was written in 1454 and then published by Regiomontanus in 1472. This treatise was an elaboration of the Ptolemaic astronomy, attempting to replace the older treatise entitled Theorica Planetarum [Gerardi], attributed to Gerard of Cremona, which was one of the major theoretical works in the university astronomical syllabus. Peurbach's Theoricae Novae Planetarum aligns more with the Parisian Alfonsine tables, while the one by Gerard of Cremona is closer to the Toledan tradition. The diagrams serve as a pedagogical tool for explaining the motion of the major planets, of the Sun and the Moon, of the fixed stars (the 8th sphere) and the eclipse theory. Theoricae is situated on folios 2r-24r, precisely it is one of the three earliest manuscripts containing this work. The diagrams that serve to illustrate Peurbach's theory occupy the margins (unlike the printed edition, where they are situated directly in the text); however, the layout of the page suggests that Regiomontanus has intentionally left wide margins to later fill them with technical drawings and notes.

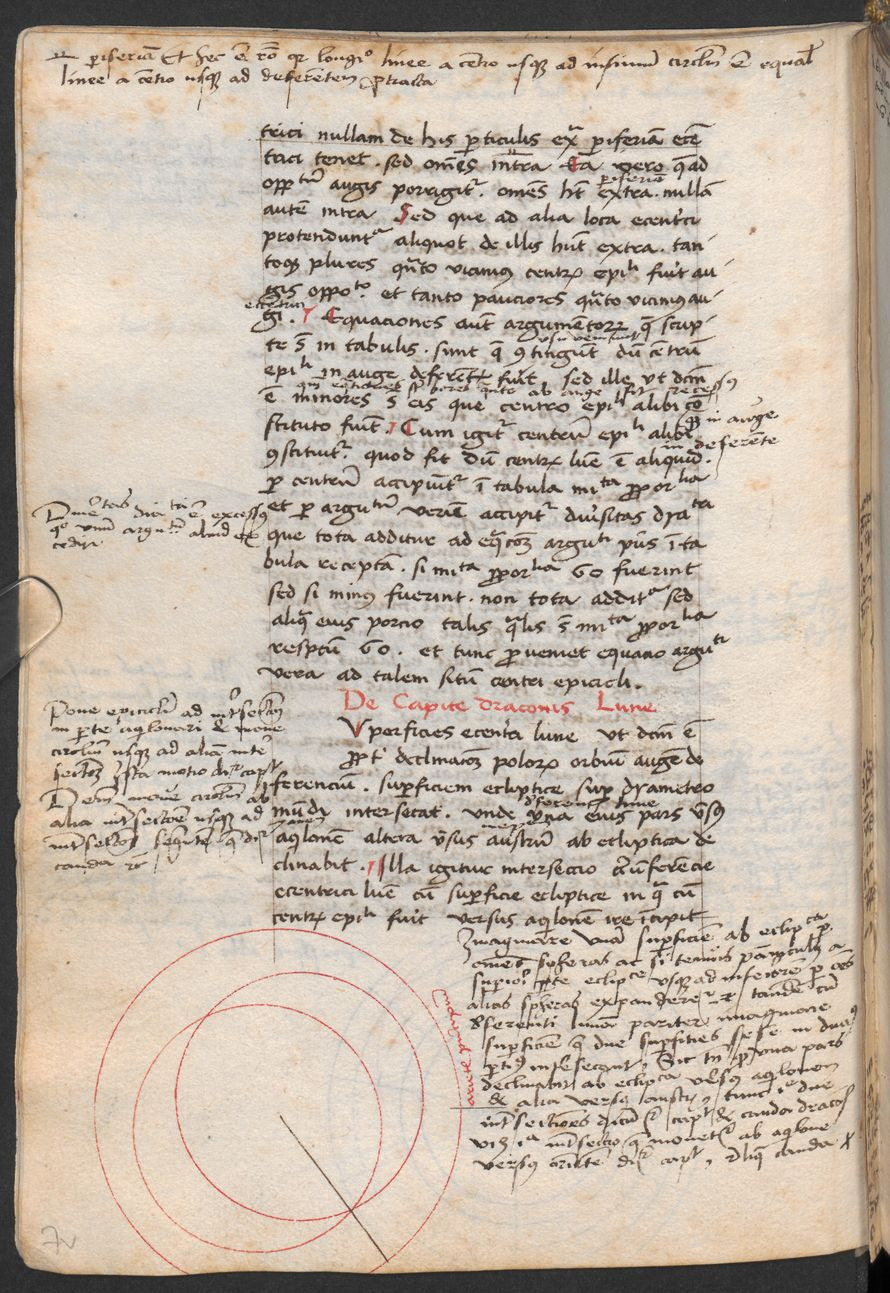
Technical drawings added after writing

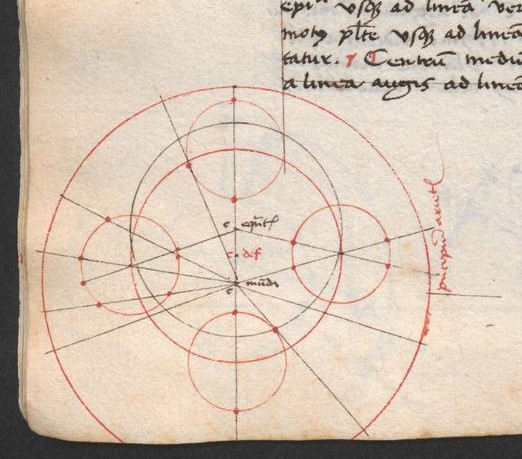
Peuerbach Theoricae novae planetarum

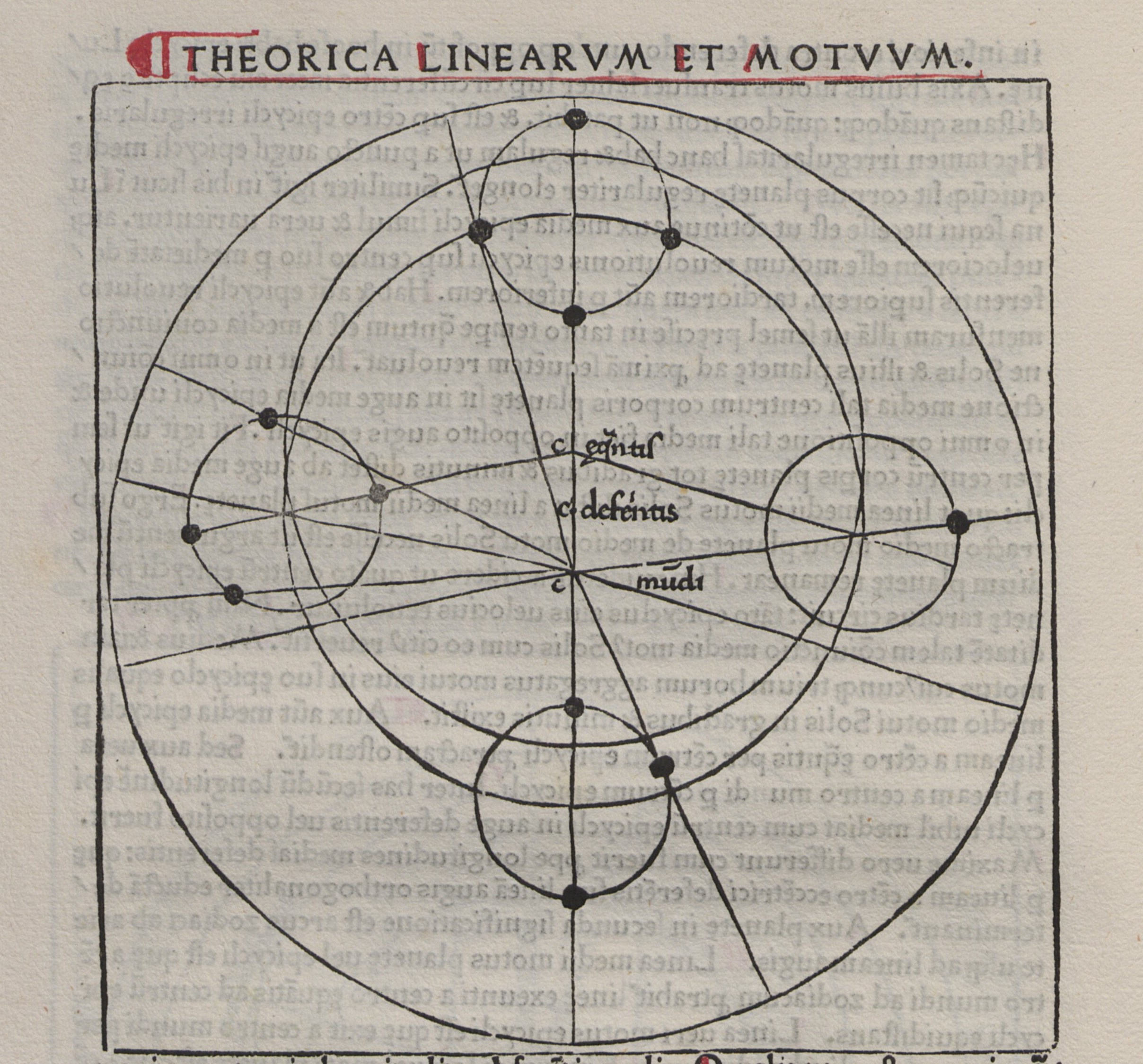
Theoricae novae planetarum Written by Peuerbach, Georg von

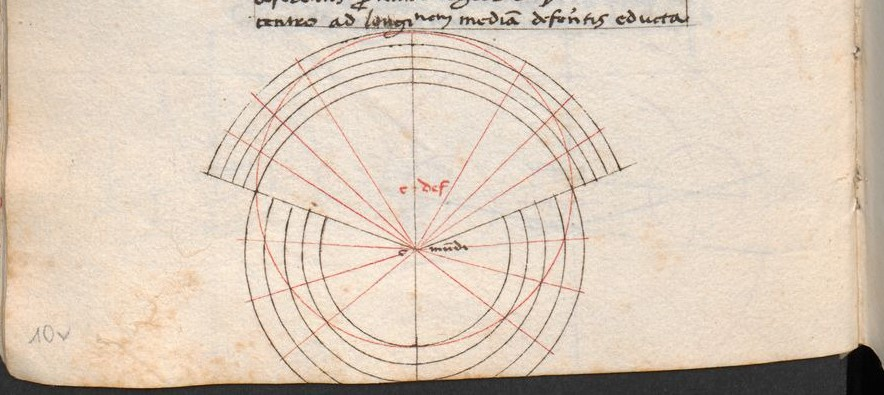

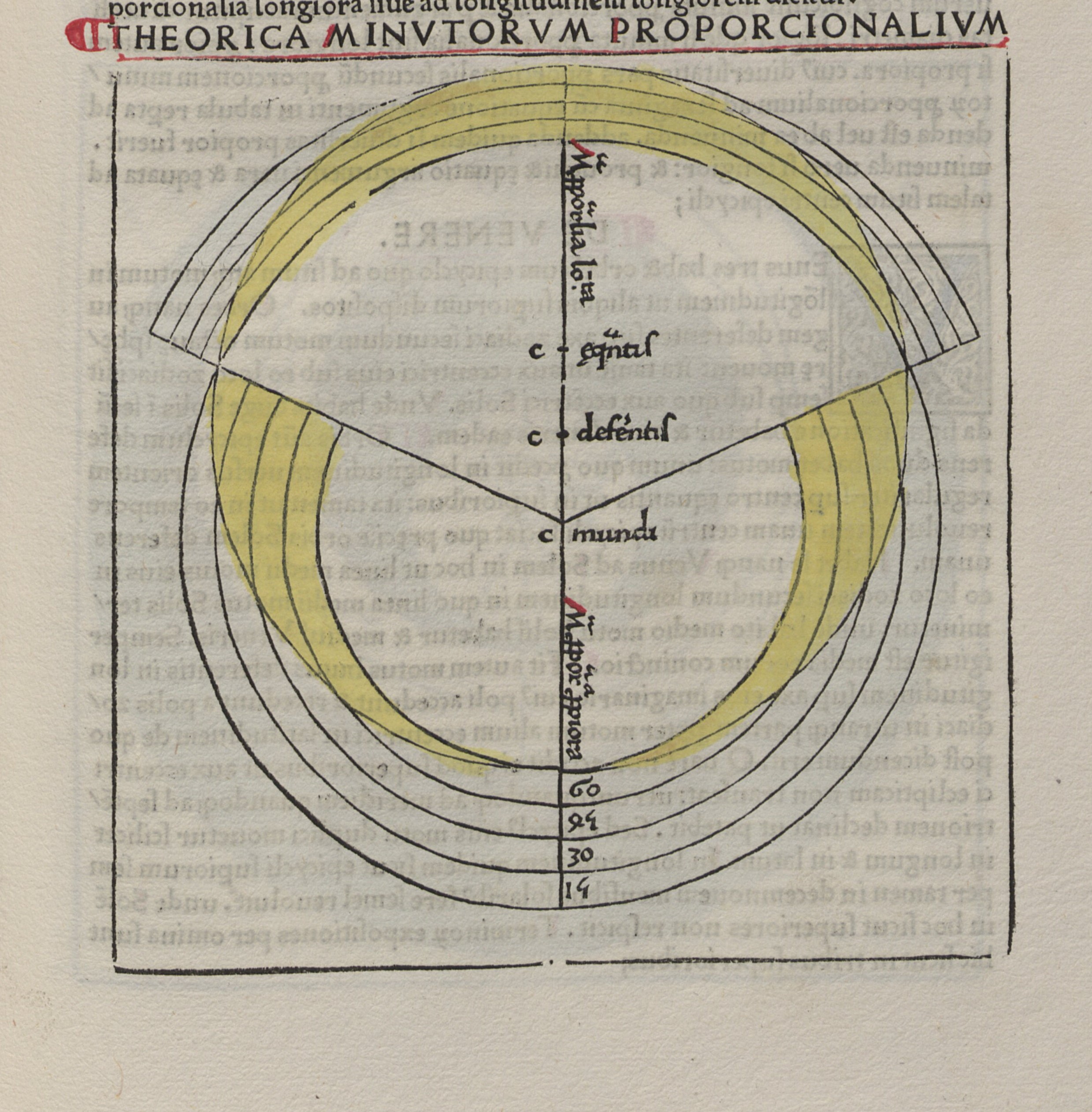

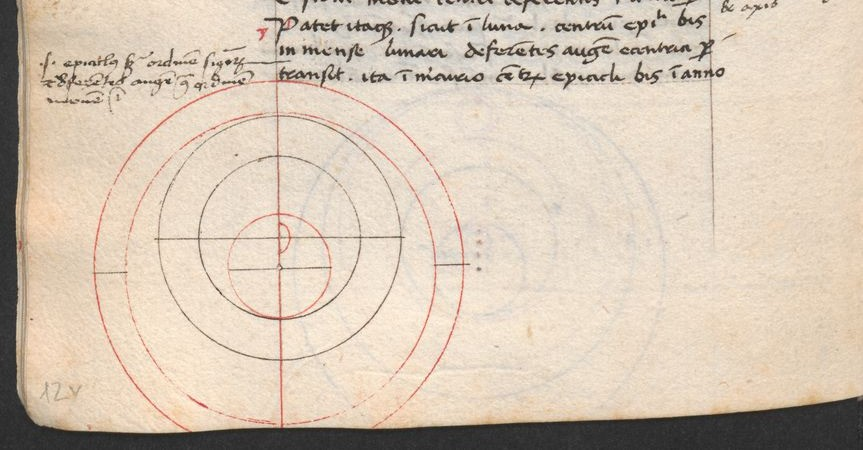

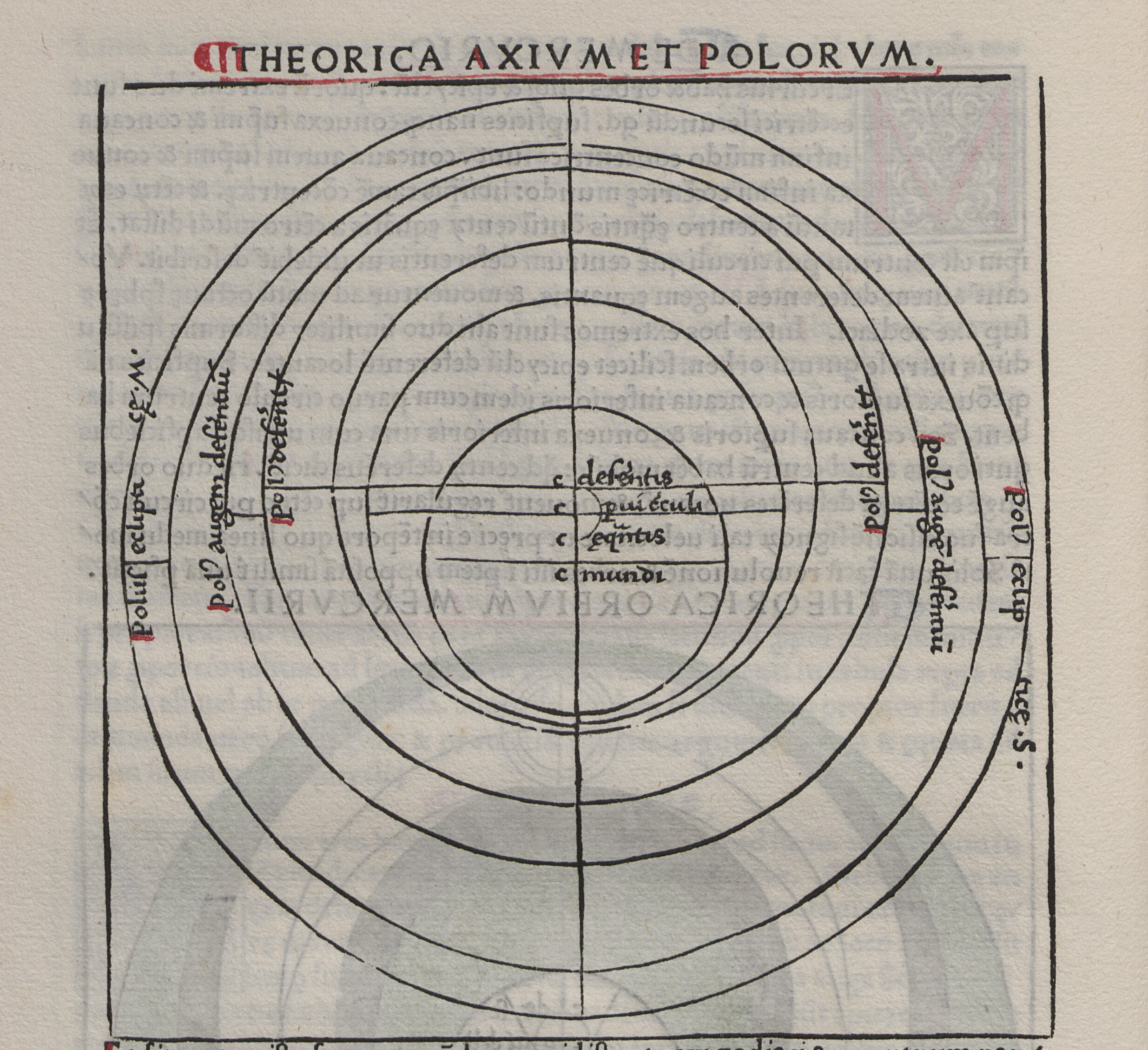

As one of the first manuscripts containing the Theoricae, written down by a future publisher of this text, Vienna ÖNB 5203 has served as a base for a printed addition at the level of diagrams as well as the text. For instance, many of the diagrams found in BSB Clm 27 are repeating those in Vienna ÖNB 5203.

=== John of Murs ===
As many of the manuscripts of the Alfonsine corpus, Vienna ÖNB 5203 contains a work of one of the key figures of the Alfonsine period—John of Murs. However, the choice of the work is rather original, as it touches upon the musical subject. John of Murs’ treatise Musica speculativa (also known under the title Musica speculativa secundum Boetium) is situated on folios 129r-133r. This work was written in and is in a certain way a summary of Boethius' musical treatise for studying purposes. The layout of folios 129r-133r is different from the rest of the manuscript, as Regiomontanus has left noticeably smaller margins in comparison with those observed in Theoricae Novae Planetarum. However, the treatise is also accompanied by a number of marginal annotations, which is not surprising, as it has been used a lot for the university teaching, and thus was annotated in various manuscripts.

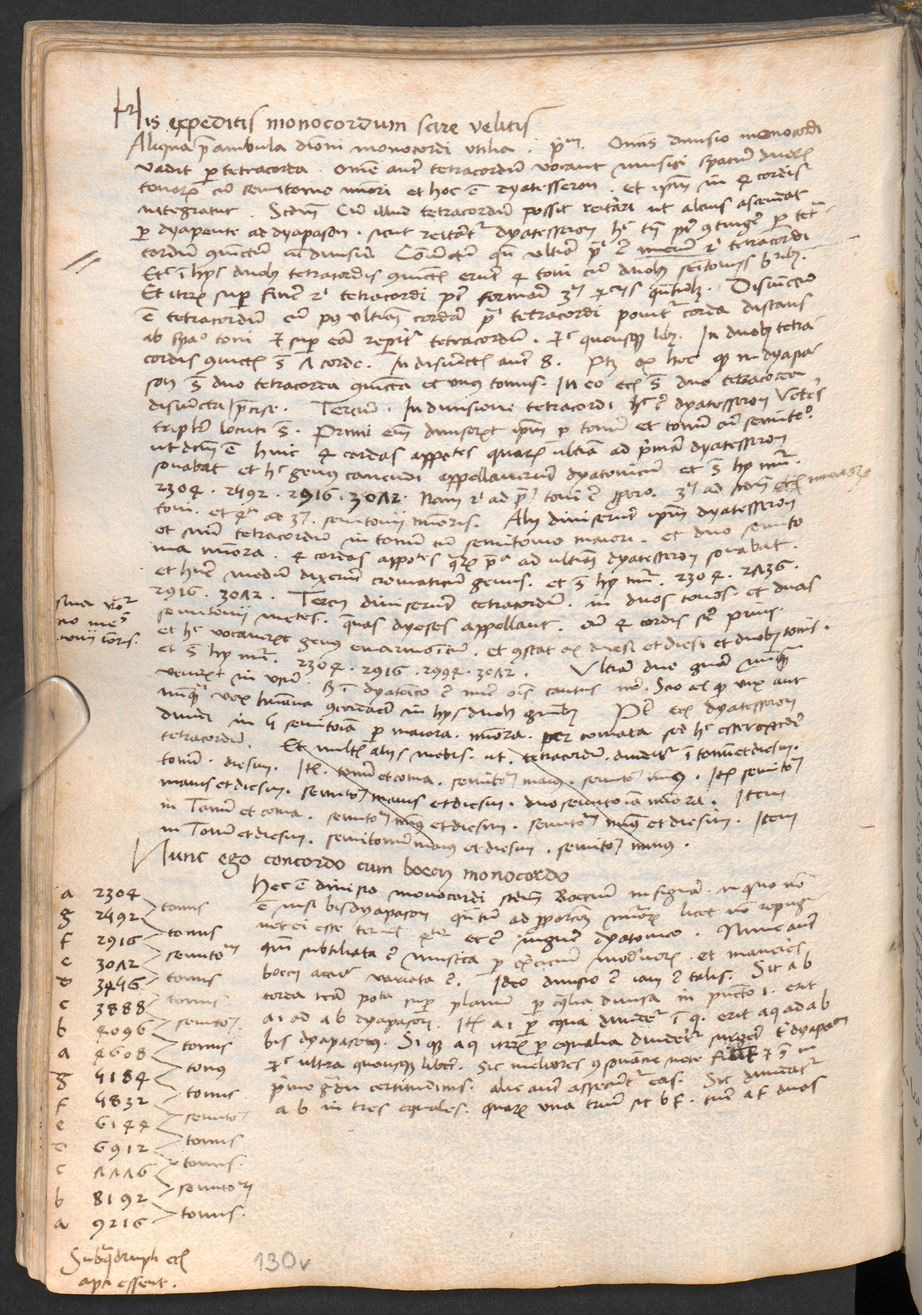
Marginal annotations in the page 130v, John of Murs Musica speculativa

=== Astronomical tables ===
Apart from canons and diagrams, Vienna ÖNB 5203 also contains a number of astronomical tables. For instance, the canon at folios 54r-58v starting "Cum diu saepe dubitarem an tabella que Solis altitudines ad horam…" and entitled Compositio tabule altitudinis Solis ad omnes horas is accompanied by tables that are integrated directly in the texts (in comparison to a common tradition of separating canons and tables within the manuscript, or sometimes even within two different manuscripts).

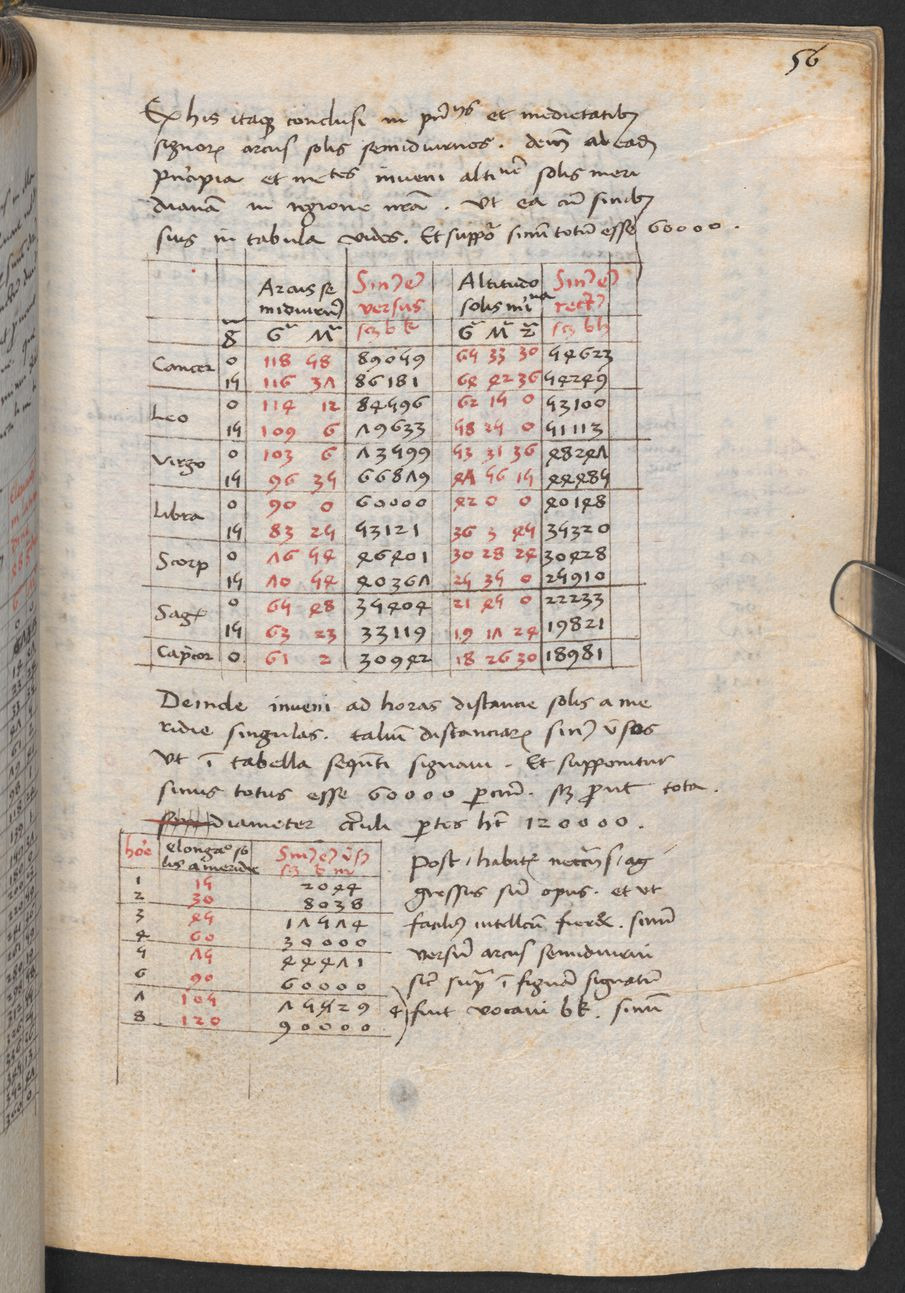
A computation of Toblique ascention in the tabular format

For instance, on folio 56v we find what appears to be a table, but is in fact a computation of Toblique ascention in the tabular format. Such type of content is not very common within the manuscripts of the alfonsine corpus; in other words, this table was perhaps not intended to be used in the computation, but rather to show how to construct a table in the first place. Folios 48r-50r contain, on the other hand, a vast table entitles Tabula radicum et numerorum cubicorum not accompanied by text. The table is incomplete and is only filled on the folios 48r-49r. Folios 49v-50r contain a lining and the column headings, however, the numbers have never been written down.

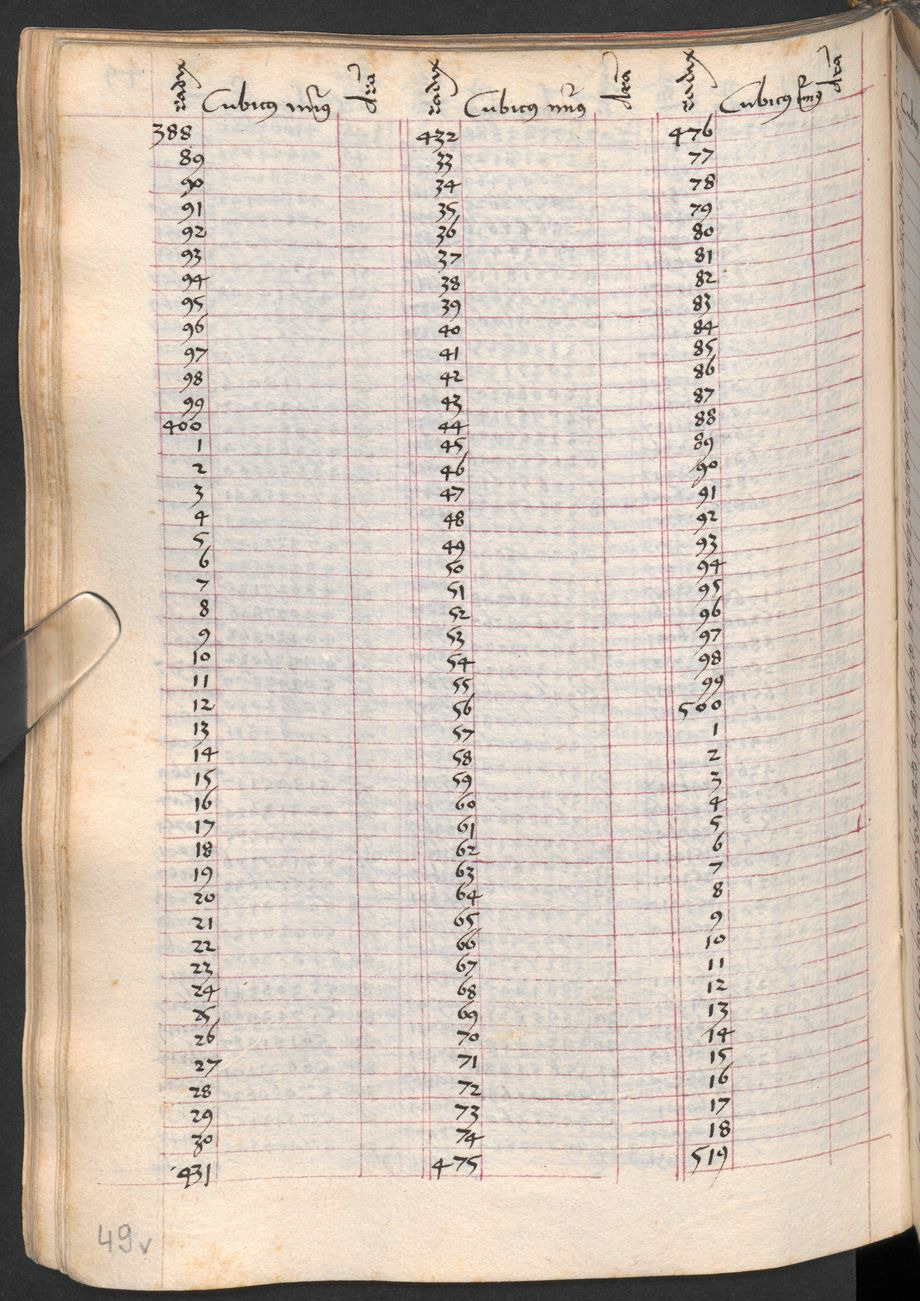
a lining and the column headings without number

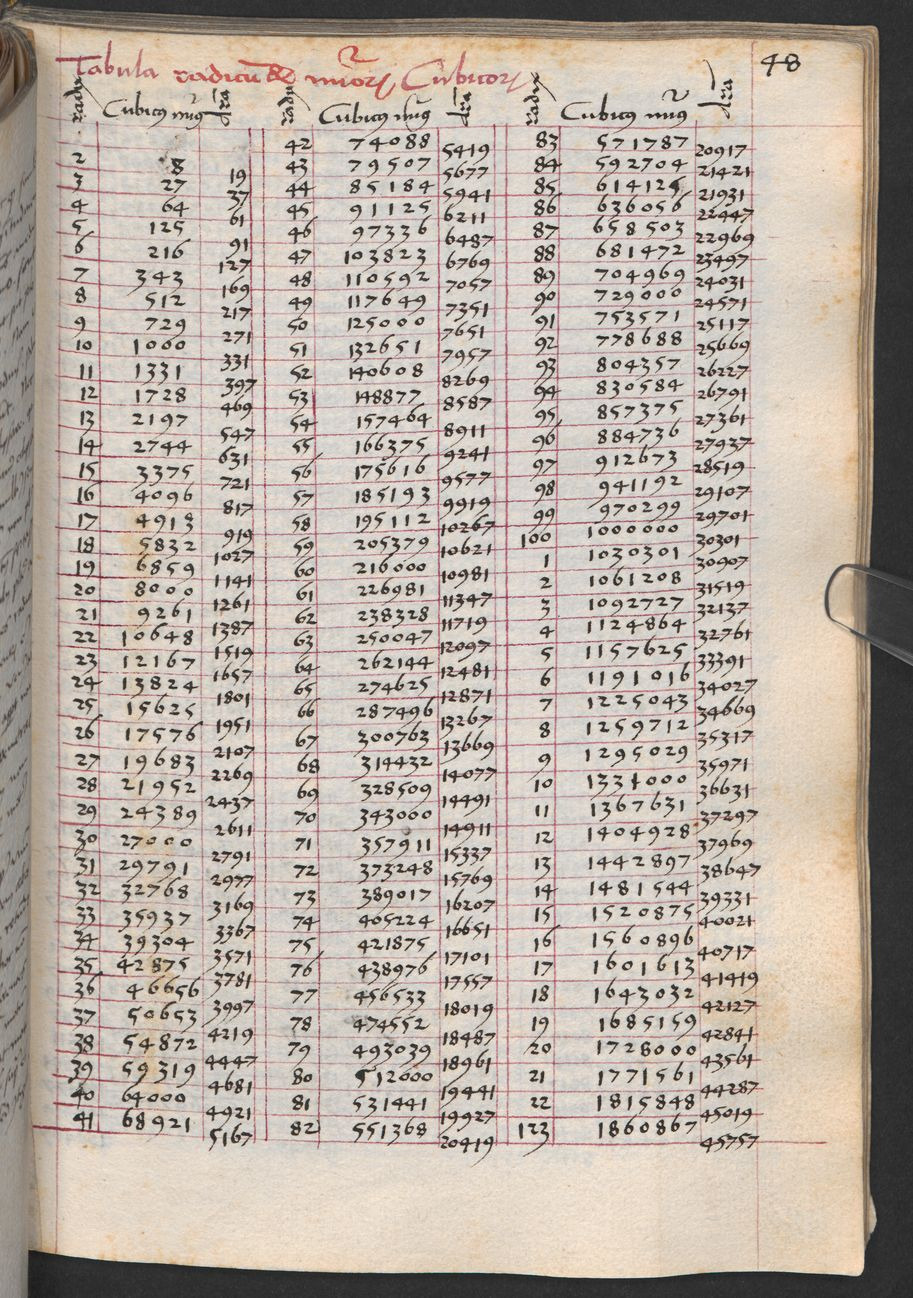
a vast table intitles Tabula radicum et numerorum cubicorum without text

== Marginal content ==
Most of the works in Vienna ÖNB 5203 are accompanied by marginal annotations. Apart from being an autograph of Regiomontanus and Peurbach, these marginal notes are of particular interest for the science historians. They give an opportunity for tracing both the manuscript production and Regiomontanus’ apprehension of the works of his predecessors and contemporaries. The marginal content is also diverse in its types and can be classified in relation to its form: diagrams, textual notes and calculations, and tabular marginalia.

== Table of content ==
The manuscript contains:

- 1r: Table of contents
- 2r-24r: Peuerbach Theoricae novae planetarum
- 28r-32v: De tabula sinus et chordarum. Fecere maiores nostri sinus et cordarum tabulas…
- 33r-41v: Tabula radicum et numerorum quadratorum, incompletely filled
- 42r: Quadratum geometricum. Sit instrumentum rectangulum abc cuius duo latera…
- 42v-44v: respective tables
- 45r-47v: Alpetragus opinabatur omnes orbes celestes ab oriente in occidentem moveri…
- 48r-50r: Tabula radicum et numerorum cubicorum, incompletely filled
- 53v: mathematical notes
- 54r-58v: Compositio tabule altitudinis Solis ad omnes horas. Cum diu saepe dubitarem an tabella que Solis altitudines ad horam…
- 67r-69v: Peuerbach Fabrica et usus instrumenti pro veris coniunctionibus et oppositionibus Solis et Lune cum animadvertissem quoddam instrumentum pro veris coniunctionibus facile reperiendis…
- 70r-71v: De equationibus dierum. Anno domini 1456to currente Sol intrabit augem suam…
- 79r-80v: Sinum totum ad sinum arcum ecliptice ab aliquo puncto…
- 80v-86r: Instrumentum universale ad inveniendum horas in quocumque climate fueris fabricare, primo in material aut metalli…
- 88r-92r: Peurbach Speculum planetarum Quoniam experimentum sermonum verorum est ut consonent…
- 100r-117r: Henry of Langenstein, De reprobatione eccentricorum et epiciclorum
- 117v-118v: De influxu celesti et iudiciis utilia. Primum celi quedam influunt Lune motu ac influxu…
- 119r-120r: Petrus de Sancto Audomaro, Theorica latitudinum planetarum. Theorica motus planetarum in latitudine…
- 124r-128r: Ptolemaica
- 128r-128v: notes on music and geometry
- 129r-133r: John of Murs, Musica speculativa
- 133v-134v: De astronomia et astrologia et cyromantia. Astronomia et astrologia in hoc differre videntur…
- 136r-137r: De proportionibus. Datis extremis duobus media inter eos…
- 137v-140v: Jordanus of Nemore, De plana spera
- 141r-141v: Apollonius of Perga, Liber de pyramidibus
- 142r-146r: Zenodorus, De isoperimetris
- 148r-166v: Gernardus, Algorismus demonstratus
- 167r-168r: notes on arithmetic
- 172r-173v: Thābit ibn Qurra (Thebit Bencora), Liber carastonis
- 174r-178v: Jordanus of Nemore, Elementa super demonstrationem ponderum
- 178v-180v: Liber de canonio
