= Gernardus =

13th-century mathematician

The Algorismus in Regiomontanus' manuscript

Gernardus was a 13th-century magister (master) and the author of the Latin arithmetical treatise Algorismus demonstratus. He belonged to the circle around Jordanus de Nemore at the University of Paris. His Algorismus was a popular text in the later Middle Ages, but largely ignored by early historians of mathematics. It is about 20,000 words in length and divided into two parts, Algorismus de integris on integers and Algorismus de minutiis on fractions. It uses letters in place of numbers for general examples. It belongs to the tradition of Boethius and it frequently cites Euclid. It probably made use of the pioneering works of Jordan, but itself contains nothing new.

The Algorismus is known from many manuscripts of the 13th through 16th centuries, but only one contains an attribution to Gernardus, who is otherwise unknown. A copy was made by Regiomontanus in Vienna, now part of manuscript 5203 of the national library. This copy was published by Johannes Schöner at Nuremberg in 1534. There is a modern edition by Gustaf Eneström.

It is possible that 'Gernardus' is a corruption of 'Jordanus' and Georg Cantor ascribed the treatise to Jordan. On the other hand, he may be identical to another member of Jordan's circle, Gerard of Brussels. Misreadings occasionally led the Algorismus to be misattributed to Regiomontanus.
