= Jordanus de Nemore =

Thirteenth-century European mathematician

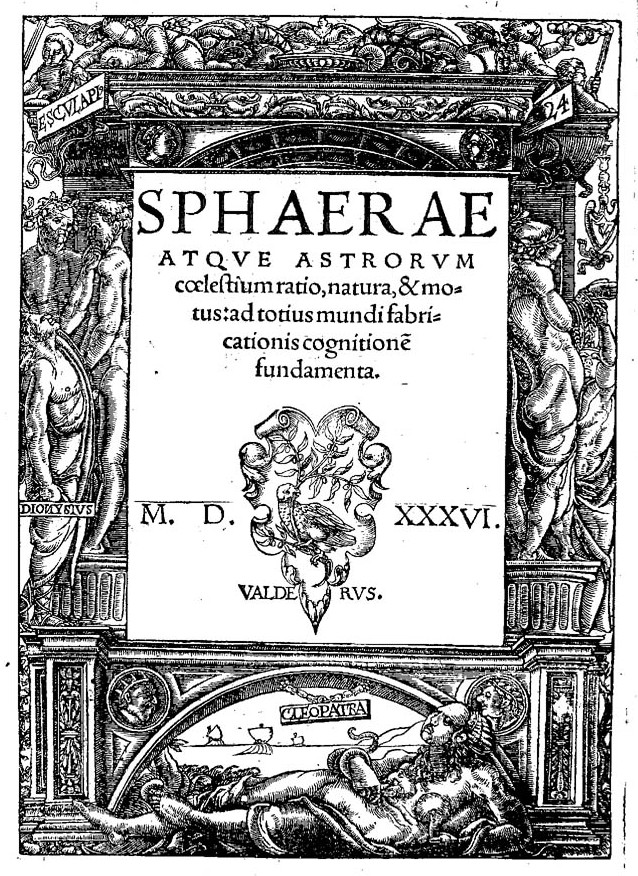
Sphaerae atque astrorum coelestium ratio, natura, et motus, 1536

Jordanus de Nemore (fl. 13th century), also known as Jordanus Nemorarius and Giordano of Nemi, was a thirteenth-century European mathematician and scientist. The literal translation of Jordanus de Nemore (Giordano of Nemi) would indicate that he was an Italian. He wrote treatises on at least 6 different important mathematical subjects: the science of weights; “algorismi” treatises on practical arithmetic; pure arithmetic; algebra; geometry; and stereographic projection. Most of these treatises exist in several versions or reworkings from the Middle Ages. We know nothing about him personally, other than the approximate date of his work.

== Life ==
No biographical details are known about Jordanus de Nemore. Cited in the early manuscripts simply as “Jordanus”, he was later given the sobriquet of “de Nemore” (“of the Forest,” “Forester”) which does not add any firm biographical information. In the Renaissance his name was often given as "Jordanus Nemorarius", an improper form.

An entry in the nineteenth-century manuscript catalogue for the Sächsische Landesbibliothek in Dresden suggested that Jordanus taught at the University of Toulouse, but the text in question was not written by Jordanus and this possible association is without foundation. A fourteenth-century chronicle of the Order of Preachers by the Englishman Nicholas Trivet (or Triveth, 1258–1328) suggested that the second master-general of the Dominican Order, Jordanus of Saxony (d. 1237) wrote two mathematical texts with titles similar to two by Jordanus de Nemore, but this late suggestion is more likely a confusion on the part of Trivet, rather than any proof of identity. Jordanus of Saxony never uses the name “de Nemore” and is nowhere else credited with mathematical writings – in fact he had lectured in theology at the University of Paris. Likewise the name of Jordanus of Saxony is never found with a mathematical text. This identity, popular among some in the nineteenth and twentieth centuries, has been for the most part abandoned.

It is assumed that Jordanus did work in the first part of the thirteenth century (or even in the late twelfth) since his works are contained in a booklist, the Biblionomia of Richard de Fournival, compiled between 1246 and 1260.

== Writings ==
=== Mechanics: scientia de ponderibus (the science of weights) ===
The medieval “science of weights” (i.e., mechanics) owes much of its importance to the work of Jordanus. In the Elementa super demonstrationem ponderum, he introduces the concept of “positional gravity” and the use of component forces. Pierre Duhem (in his Origines de la statique, 1905) thought that Jordanus also introduces infinitesimal considerations into statics in his discussion of "virtual" displacements (this being another interpretation of Duhem) of objects in equilibrium. He proves the law of the lever by means of the principle of work. The De ratione ponderis also proves the conditions of equilibrium of unequal weights on planes inclined at different angles – long before it was re-established by Simon Stevin (with his clootcrans -- "wreath of spheres" experiment) and later by Galileo.

The Elementa super demonstrationem ponderum seems to be the one work which can definitely be ascribed to Jordanus; and the first of the series. Jordanus took what Joseph Brown has called the "Logician’s Abstract of On the Karaston" (a skillful compression of the conclusions of Thābit ibn Qurra’s Liber karastonis) and created a new treatise (7 axioms and 9 propositions) in order to establish a mathematical basis for the four propositions on the Roman balance called the Liber de canonio. An early commentary on this (which also contains a necessary correction to Proposition 9) is the “Corpus Christi Commentary”.

The Liber de ponderibus fuses the seven axioms and nine propositions of the Elementa to the four propositions of the De canonio. There are at least two commentary traditions to the Liber de ponderibus which improve some of the demonstrations and better integrate the two sources.

The De ratione ponderis is a skillfully corrected and expanded version (45 propositions) of the Elementa. This is usually ascribed to Jordanus, but more likely it is the work of an unidentified mathematician because the citations by Jordanus of his other works are deleted.

Related to these treatises is an anonymous set of comments, each of which begins with the words “Aliud commentum” (and thus known as the “Aliud commentum” version). This commentary surpasses all others, especially the commentary on Proposition 1.

=== Algorismi treatises ===
There are 5 algorismi treatises in this category, examined by Gustaf Eneström early in the twentieth century, dealing with practical arithmetic.

The Communis et consuetus (its opening words) appears to be the earliest form of the work, closely related to the much expanded Demonstratio de algorismo. Eneström believed that the Communis et consuetus was certainly by Jordanus.

The later Demonstratio de algorismo contains 21 definitions and 34 propositions. This is probably a later version of the Communis et consuetus, made either by Jordanus himself or by some other thirteenth-century mathematician.

The Tractatus minutiarum on fractions seems to be a second part of the Communis et consuetus – they are often found together in the manuscripts.

The Demonstratio de minutiius likewise is linked to the Demonstratio de algorismo, and contains and expands the propositions found in the Tractatus minutiarum – again a re-edition of the original text.

The Algorismus demonstratus is a spurious attribution although for a long time this item was ascribed to Jordanus. Up until Eneström began to sort out the various treatises, the Algorismus demonstratus – since it was the only one published (ed. Johannes Schöner, Nuremberg, 1543) – was the heading under which all the treatises were grouped. Eneström thought it highly unlikely, however, that this version was the work of Jordanus since no manuscript ascribes it to him (if they give an author, it is generally a Magister Gernarus, or Gerhardus or Gernandus). The first part of this treatise (also known as the Algorismus de integris) contains definitions, axioms and 43 propositions. The second part (the Algorismus de minutiis) contains definitions and 42 propositions. Eneström shows that while different from the algorismi treatises of Jordanus, the Algorismus demonstratus is still closely related to them.

=== Arithmetic: The De elementis arismetice artis ===
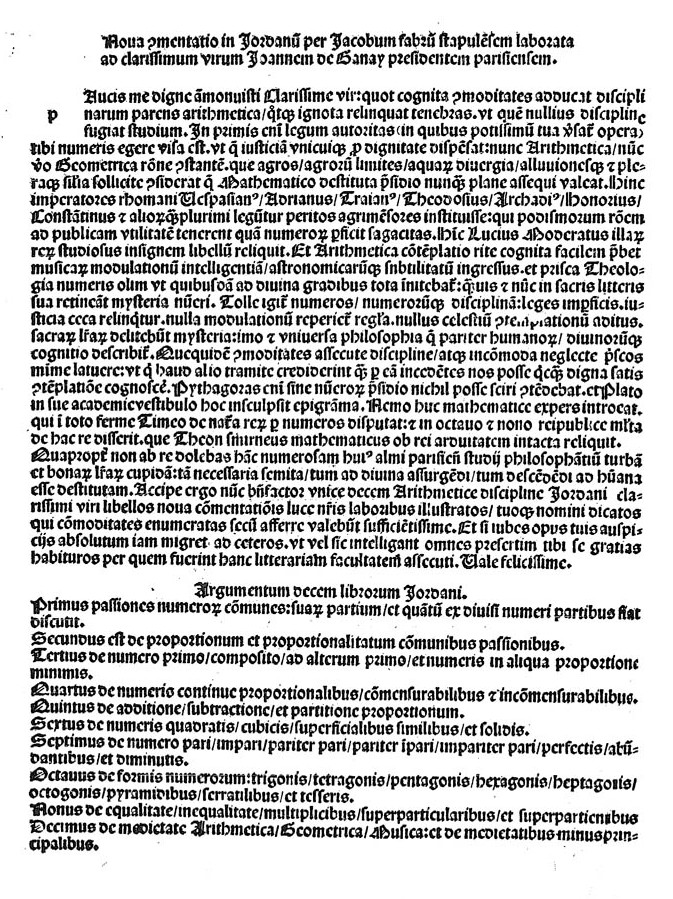
Demonstrationes in Arithmetica

This treatise on arithmetic contains over 400 propositions divided into ten books. There are three versions or editions in manuscript form, the second one with different or expanded proofs than found in the first, and a number of propositions added at the end; the third version inserts the added propositions into their logical position in the text, and again changed some of the proofs. Jordanus’ aim was to write a complete summary of arithmetic, similar to what Euclid had done for geometry.

Jordanus collected and organized the whole field of arithmetic, based both on Euclid’s work and on that of Boethius. Definitions, axioms and postulates lead to propositions with proofs which are somewhat sketchy at times, leaving the reader to complete the argument. Here also Jordanus uses letters to represent numbers, but numerical examples, of the type found in the De numeris datis, are not given.

=== Algebra: The De numeris datis ===
The editor of this treatise on algebra, Barnabas Hughes, has found two sets of manuscripts for this text, one containing 95 propositions, the other, 113. As well some of the common propositions have different proofs. There are also 4 digests or revisions in manuscript form.

Jordanus’ De numeris datis was the first treatise in advanced algebra composed in Western Europe, building on elementary algebra provided in twelfth-century translations from Arabic sources. It anticipates by 350 years the introduction of algebraic analysis by François Viète into Renaissance mathematics. Jordanus used a system similar to that of Viète (although couched on non-symbolic terms) of formulating the equation (setting out the problem in terms of what is known and of what is to be found), of transforming the initial given equation into a solution, and the introduction of specific numbers that fulfil the conditions set by the problem.

=== Geometry: Liber philotegni and the De triangulis ===
This is medieval geometry at its best. It contains propositions on such topics as the ratios of sides and angles of triangles; the division of straight lines, triangles, and quadrangles under different conditions; the ratio of arcs and plane segments in the same or in different circles; trisecting an angle; the area of triangles given the length of the sides; squaring the circle.

Again there are two versions of this text: the shorter and presumably first edition (the Liber philotegni Iordani de Nemore) and a longer version (Liber de triangulis Iordani) which divides the text into books, re-arranges and expands book 2, and adds propositions 4-12 to 4-28. This latter set of 17 propositions also circulated separately. While the longer version may not be by Jordanus, it was certainly complete by the end of the thirteenth century.

=== Stereographic projection: Demonstratio de plana spera ===
De plana spera, geometric drawing

This treatise of five propositions deals with various aspects of stereographic projection (used in planispheric astrolabes). The first and historically the most important proposition proves for all cases that circles on the surface of a sphere when projected stereographically on a plane remain circles (or a circle of infinite radius, i.e., a straight line). While this property was known long before Jordanus, it had never been proved.

There are three versions of the treatise: the basic text, a second version with an introduction and a much expanded text, and a third, only slightly expanded. The introduction is sometimes found with version 1 and 3, but it was obviously written by someone else.

=== Dubious and spurious works ===
The De proportionibus (on ratios), the Isoperimetra (on figures with equal perimeters), the Demonstrationes pro astrolapsu (on astrolabe engraving), and the Pre-exercitamina (“a short introductory exercise”?) are dubiously ascribed to Jordanus. A number of other texts including a Liber de speculis and a Compositum astrolabii are spurious ascriptions.

=== Historical fiction ===
The book "Eresia Pura", by Adriano Petta is a fiction, in italian, based on historical research, around the life of Jordanus de Nemore.

== Editions of Jordanus’ works ==
Most of Jordanus' works have been published in critical editions in the twentieth century.

1. Mechanics: The three main treatises and the “Aliud commentum” version (Latin and English) are published in The Medieval Science of Weights, ed. Ernest A. Moody and Marshall Clagett (Madison: University of Wisconsin Press, 1952). The commentaries are also found in Joseph E. Brown, “The ‘Scientia de ponderibus’ in the Later Middle Ages,” PhD. Dissertation, University of Wisconsin, 1967. The Liber de ponderibus and the “Aliud commentum” version were published by Petrus Apianus (= Peter Bienewitz) in Nuremberg, 1533; and the De ratione ponderis was published by Nicolò Tartaglia in Venice, 1565.

2. The Algorismi treatises: The articles by Gustaf Eneström, which contain the Latin text of the introductions, definitions and propositions, but only some of the proofs, were published in Biblioteca Mathematica, ser 3, vol. 7 (1906–07), 24-37; 8 (1907–08), 135-153; 13 (1912–13), 289-332; 14 (1913–14) 41-54 and 99-149.

3. Arithmetic (the De elementis arithmetice artis): Jacques Lefèvre d’Étaples (1455–1536) published a version (with his own demonstrations and comments) in Paris in 1496; this was reprinted Paris, 1514. The modern edition is: H. L. L. Busard, Jordanus de Nemore, De elementis arithmetice artis. A Medieval Treatise on Number Theory (Stuttgart: Franz Steiner Verlag, 1991), 2 parts.

4. Algebra (De numeris data): The text was published in the 19th century, but a critical edition now exists: Jordanus de Nemore, De numeris datis, ed. Barnabas B. Hughes (Berkeley: University of California Press, 1981).

5. Geometry: "De triangulis" was first published by M.Curtze in "Mittheilungen des Copernicusvereins für Wissenschaft und Kunst" Heft VI - Thorn, 1887. See in Kujawsko-Pomorska Digital Library: http://kpbc.umk.pl/dlibra/docmetadata?id=39881. More recently, the Liber philotegni Iordani and the Liber de triangulis Iordani have been critically edited and translated in: Marshall Clagett, Archimedes in the Middle Ages (Philadelphia: American Philosophical Society, 1984), 5: 196-293 and 346-477, which is much improved over Curtze's edition.

6. Stereographic projection: The text of version 3 of the Demonstratio de plana spera and the introduction were published in the sixteenth century – Basel, 1536 and Venice, 1558. All versions are edited and translated in: Ron B. Thomson, Jordanus de Nemore and the Mathematics of Astrolabes: De Plana Spera (Toronto: Pontifical Institute of Mediaeval Studies, 1978).
