= Lychnos =

Lychnos: Lärdomshistoriska samfundets årsbok (ISSN 0076-1648) is an annual academic journal published since 1936 by the Swedish History of Science Society (Lärdomshistoriska samfundet; based in Uppsala and established two years prior to the publication of the first volume). Articles are mostly in Swedish, with summaries in English, German, or French. A number of volumes have also been published in a monograph series called Lychnos-bibliotek (ISSN 0076-163X), starting the same year as the periodical.

== History ==
Lychnos and the society were both the brainchildren of Johan Nordström, since 1933 the first holder of a then-new professorship in the History of Ideas and Learning at Uppsala University.

Nordström was an ardent popularizer and had the ambition to establish a periodical such as the American journal Isis, published by George Sarton since 1912, and a society corresponding to Sarton's History of Science Society, founded in 1924 to support the continued publication of the journal. Sarton visited Sweden in 1934 and was greeted as a celebrity and a long interview with him was published in the Stockholm morning paper Svenska Dagbladet. When Nordström originally met Sarton is unknown, but after Sarton's visit to Sweden, the two scholars continued to correspond for twenty years, until Sarton's death in 1956.

To recruit members for his society, Nordström went through Sveriges statskalender, the official yearbook of public administration, and collected names and addresses of every person he could imagine having an interest in the subject: physicians, teachers, clergymen, civil servants, etc. The society became a great success: after a year, it had 1750 members. By 1937, it had 3000 members. This figure prevailed in 1950, when it was the largest society of its kind in the world, larger in absolute numbers than the American society. In 1991 it was still reported to be one of the largest in the world.

The first volume of the annual journal was published in 1936 and had about 550 pages containing 21 papers, mostly in Swedish but with summaries in English, German, or French, and more than 150 reviews of books. The same year also saw the first volume of an accompanying monograph series, Lychnos-bibliotek, a biography of Anders Celsius by N. V. E. Nordenmark. Sarton, who had known what was in the doing but had refrained from reporting on the foundation of the Swedish society until its first publications came out, greeted both enthusiastically in a combined review in volume 26 of Isis. He concluded: "Lychnos has made a splendid beginning in two directions. Long live learned Lychnos!"

Nordström was a student of literary scholar Henrik Schück and had written his own dissertation (1924) on the philosophical fragments of the 17th century poet Georg Stiernhielm, and the focus of articles published in Lychnos long remained early modern science and thinking, including parts that would now be considered unscientific but were connected to the early development of modern science, such as astrology and alchemy. An explanation for this focus on the early modern period offered by the American scholar Robert Marc Friedman is the "general lack of formal training in natural science" in what he calls the "Uppsala school". Later decades have seen an increasing number of chairs in "History of ideas" or "History of science" at other Swedish universities and this has resulted both in more diverse topics and in more varied theoretical approaches than before being represented in Lychnos.

Lychnos receives financial support from the Swedish Research Council. It has received from 50,000 to 130,000 SEK annually since the publication year 2002.)

== Editors ==
Nordström remained editor of Lychnos until 1949. The editorship was long held by the holders of the same chair held by Nordström. Nordström's successors have been:

- Sten Lindroth, Uppsala (1950-1980)
- Gunnar Eriksson, Uppsala (1980-1990)
- Karin Johannisson, Uppsala (1990-2000)
- Sven Widmalm, Linköping University (2000-2006)
- Bosse Holmqvist, Stockholm University (2007-).
