= Anders Ekström (historian of ideas) =

Swedish historian of ideas (born 1965)

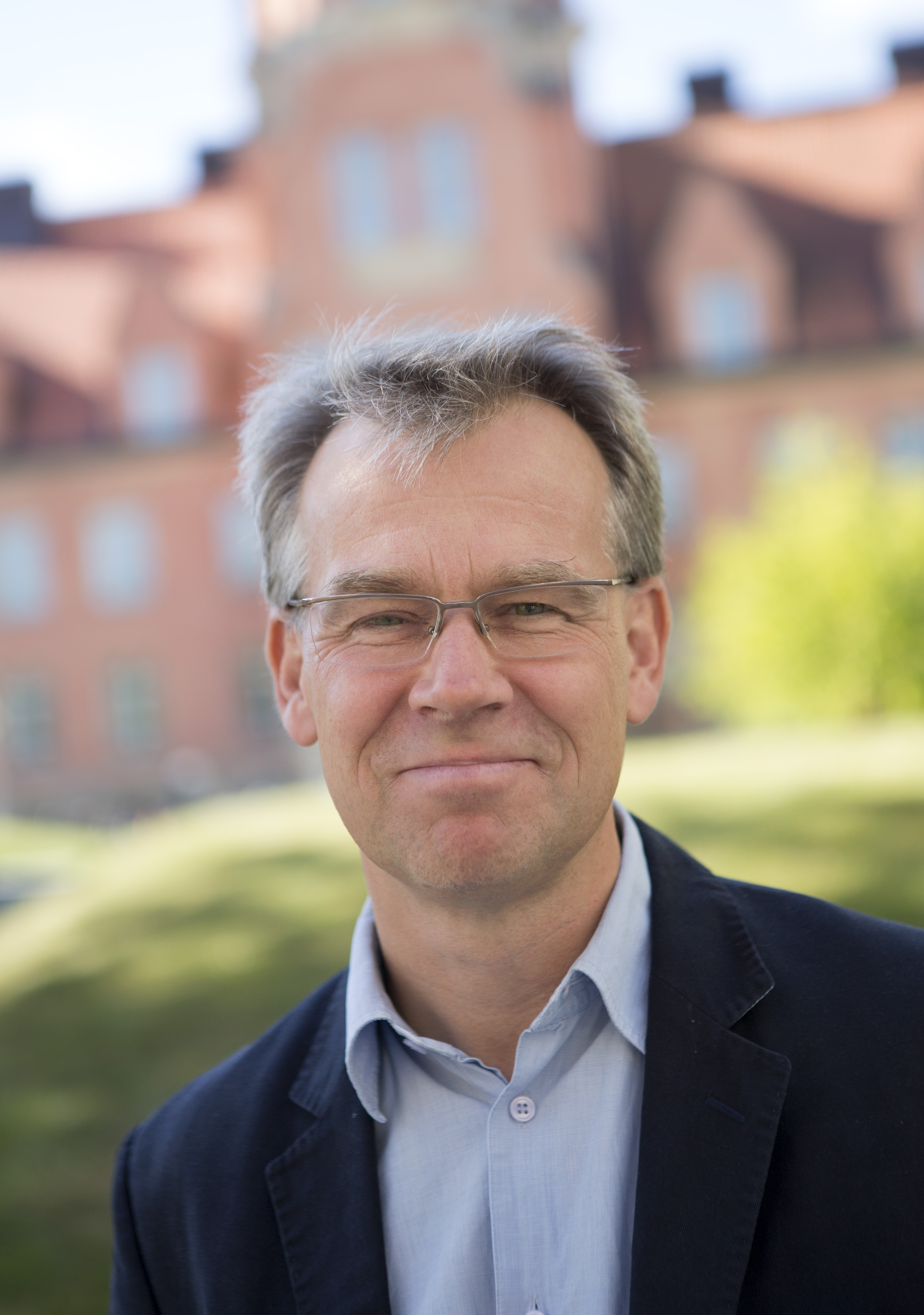
- Anders Ekström (2013)

Academic background
- Thesis: The World on Display: The Stockholm Exhibition of 1897 and the World's Fairs of the Nineteenth Century (title in translation)

Academic work
- Discipline: history of ideas

Anders Ekström (born 1965), is a Swedish historian of ideas, professor at the department of History of Science and Ideas at the University of Uppsala.

== Biography ==
Ekström's holds a Ph.D from 1994, The World on Display: The Stockholm Exhibition of 1897 and the World's Fairs of the Nineteenth Century (title in translation), which was awarded the Johan Nordström and Sten Lindroth prize for scholarly excellence. More recently, Ekström has been awarded prizes for his interdisciplinary work and for initiating debates on the role of the humanities in future societies. Anders Ekström previously held positions at Uppsala University, the Swedish Institute of Studies in Education and Research (Stockholm), Linköping University, and KTH Royal Institute of Technology (Stockholm). He was a visiting fellow at the Swedish Collegium for Advanced Study in Uppsala in 1999 and in 2025–2026. In 2005-2006, he was a visiting researcher at University of Cambridge. In 2013, he was a visiting fellow at the Centre for Research in the Arts, Social Sciences and Humanities (CRASSH) and at Clare Hall College, both in Cambridge. In 2012, he was appointed Adjunct Professor of Media History at the Department of General History at the University of Turku in Finland. In 2014, he was elected Vice-Dean of the Faculty of Arts at the University of Uppsala, with special responsibility for research and Ph.D training. In 2014-2015, he was an expert on the Swedish government's official committee on museums.

== Research ==
He has published on modern cultural history, media history and theory for more than 25 years, including 10 individually authored, co-authored and edited books. His overall research and teaching interests include modern Scandinavian and European cultural and intellectual history (especially 1800-1950), media history, visual culture, cultural theory, museum and exhibition studies, science and society, science and media, history of humanities, research and higher education policy.

== Selected publications ==
- Den utställda världen: Stockholmsutställningen 1897 och 1800-talets världsutställningar, Nordiska museets handlingar nummer 119, Nordiska museet 1994, ISBN 91-7108-370-7, dissertation.
- Dödens exempel: självmordstolkningar i svenskt 1800-tal genom berättelsen om Otto Landgren, Atlantis, Stockholm 2000, ISBN 91-7486-919-1.
- Representation och materialitet: introduktioner till kulturhistorien, Nya Doxa 2009, ISBN 978-91-578-0548-5.
- Viljan att synas, viljan att se: medieumgänge och publik kultur kring 1900, Monografier utgivna av Stockholms stad nummer 212, Stockholmia, Stockholm 2010, ISBN 9789170312250 (inb)
- Alltings mått: humanistisk kunskap i framtidens samhälle, Norstedts, Stockholm 2012, ISBN 978-91-1-304433-0, (tillsammans med Sverker Sörlin)
