= Sverker Sörlin =

Swedish environmental historian

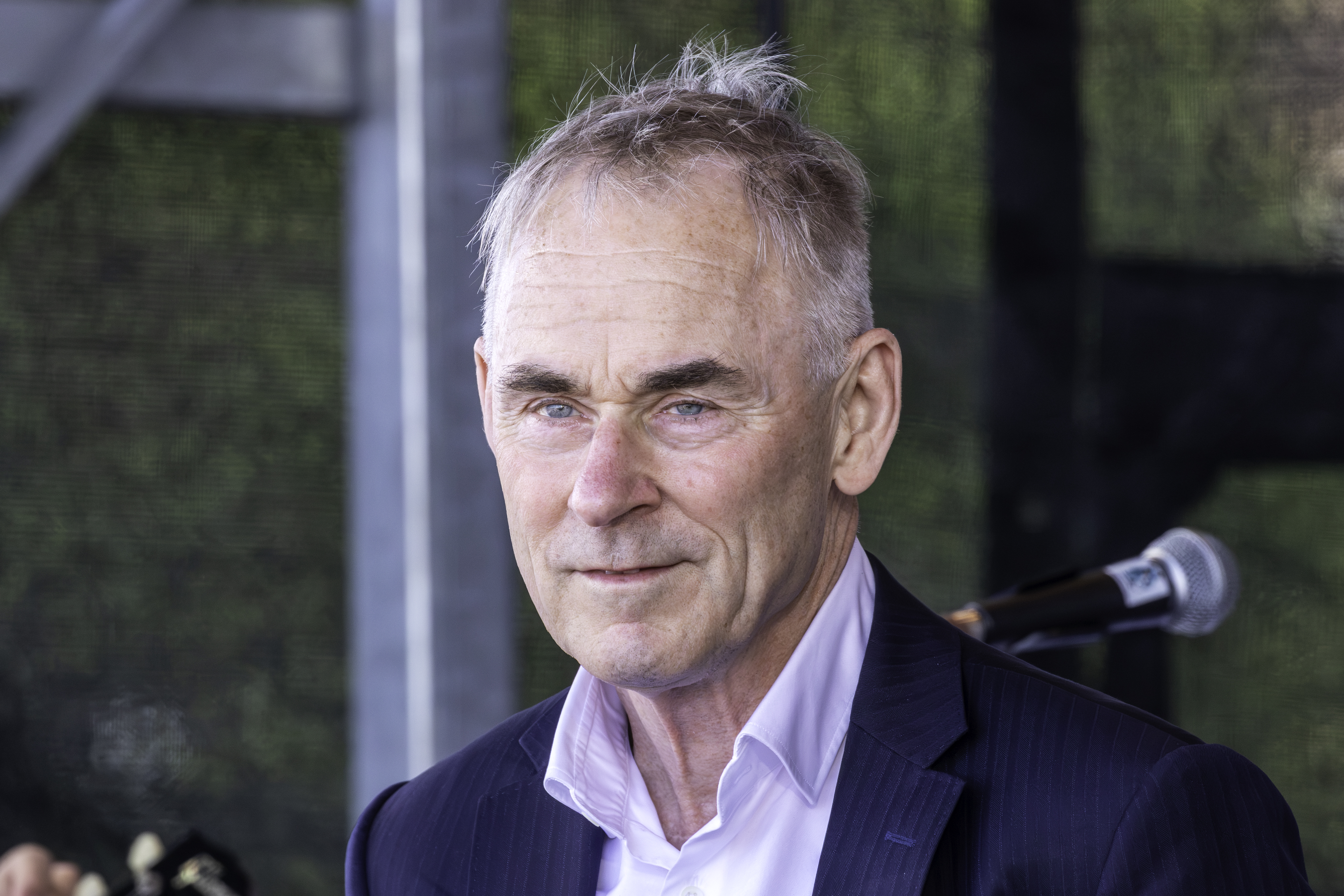
- Sörlin 2026
- Born: 6 August 1956 (age 70)
- Occupation: Swedish academic

Sverker Sörlin (born 6 August 1956 in Åsele, Västerbotten) is a Swedish historian of ideas, professor of environmental history, and writer.

== Biography ==
Sörlin has a PhD in the history of ideas from Umeå University from 1988. In 1993, he assumed the first chair in environmental history in Scandinavia, also at Umeå University. Since 2007, he is professor of environmental history at the Division of History of Science, Technology and Environment at the KTH Royal Institute of Technology in Stockholm. He has held an adjunct position at the Stockholm Resilience Centre (2005–2012), and visiting positions at University of California Berkeley (1993), University of Cambridge (2004–2005), University of Oslo (2006), University of Cape Town (2012–2013), and the Institute for Advanced Study, Princeton (2013–2014). In 2011, he was awarded an honorary doctorate by University of Turku, Finland. Sörlin has held a Resident Fellowship (2022–2023) as well as a Non-resident Long-term Fellowship at the Swedish Collegium for Advanced Study in Uppsala, Sweden. He is currently a member of the Academic Senate at the same institute.

Sörlin was Associate Director for the Center for History of Science in the Royal Swedish Academy of Sciences 1988–1990, and the founding director of the Swedish Institute for Studies in Education and Research, SISTER (2000–2003). Between 2006 and 2009, he chaired the Swedish committee for the International Polar Year. In 1994–1998 and 2005–2009, he served on the Swedish Government's Research Advisory Board, and he is currently on the Government's Environmental Research board.

Sörlin has published in the fields of history of science, environmental history, the history of forestry, human ecology, environmental humanities, European history, research policy, innovations studies, and the history and politics of higher education. He frequently appears in Swedish media, and also writes popular science and narrative non-fiction. He edited Tvärsnitt, a popular science magazine, between 1986 and 1991. He has received several awards, including Augustpriset (2004) and the Lars Salvius award (2012).

Since its inception on 1 January 2018, Sörlin has been a member of the independent expert body, the Climate Policy Council.

== Selected books (in English) ==
- Denationalizing Science: The Contexts of International Scientific Practice, with Elisabeth Crawford & Terry Shinn (1993)
- Sustainability – the Challenge: People, Power, and the Environment, with L. Anders Sandberg (1998)
- Narrating the Arctic: A Cultural History of Nordic Scientific Practices, with Michael T. Bravo (2002)
- Knowledge Society vs. Knowledge Economy, with Hebe Vessuri (2007)
- Nature’s End: Environment and History, with Paul Warde (2009)
- Science, Geopolitics and Culture in the Polar Region - Norden Beyond Borders (2013)
- The Future of Nature: Documents of Global Change, with Libby Robin och Paul Warde (2013)
- The Environment: A History of the Idea, with Libby Robin and Paul Warde (2018)
- Grounding Urban Natures: Histories and Futures of Urban Ecologies, with Henrik Ernstson (2019)
- Ice Humanities: Living, Working and Thinking in a Melting World, with Klaus Dodds (2022)
- Pathways: Exploring the Routes of a Movement Heritage, with Daniel Svensson & Katarina Saltzman (2022)
- Resource Extraction and Arctic Communities: The New Extractivist Paradigm (2023)
- Stockholm and the Rise of Global Environmental Governance - The Human Environment with Eric Paglia (2025)
- Snö – a history

== Prizes and awards ==
- 2011 – Honorary degree at University of Turku
- 2022 – Honorary degree at University of Bergen
