= Expedition to Surat =

Swedish expedition to Surat

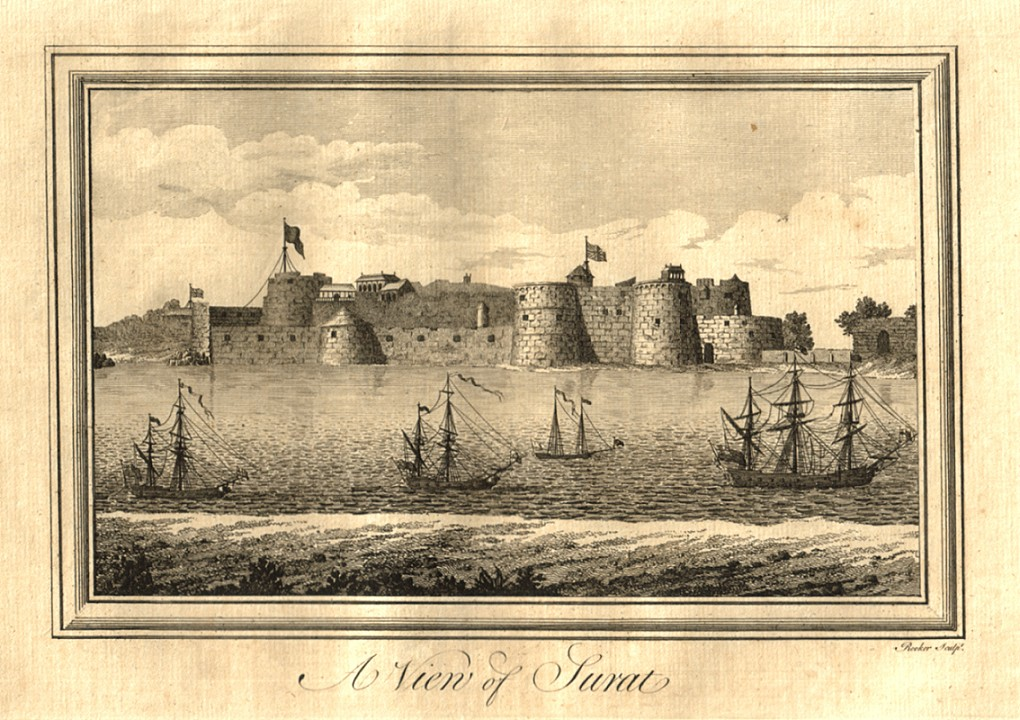
- "A View of Surat" by Edward Rooker
Date	April 1760
Location	Surat, Gujarat 21°12′18″N 72°50′24″E
Result	Indian victory
Territorial changes	Swedish factory at Surat is occupied

Belligerents
Swedish East India Company	Local Nawab

Commanders and leaders
Christopher Henric Braad (POW)	Unknown

Strength
Unknown	Unknown

Casualties and losses
Several captured	Unknown

The expedition to Surat was the failed establishment of a factory at Surat by the Swedish East India Company in April 1760. After being instigated by both British and Dutch authorities, the local Nawab sent Indian troops and occupied the fortress, holding Christopher Henric Braad and several of his companions captive for 20 days.

== Background ==
After some time in India, Christopher Henric Braad, a member of the SOIC, had grown tired of waiting for a Swedish ship to arrive. Instead, he boarded a British vessel bound for Europe, and after being saved from a shipwreck in Limerick, he arrived back in Göteborg in 1759.

After going back to the SOIC's headquarters, he began arguing for a new Swedish factory there, showing different numbers and graphs. He also argued that the imminent war between France and Britain would allow an opportunity for Sweden. A Swedish factory could be established in Surat, where prices were lower and where people would be able to find markets for their goods, allowing them to buy cotton among other things to export to China.

== Expedition ==
In April 1760, the ship Riksens Ständer with Braad onboard began its journey to India, with the goal being to establish a new Swedish factory in Surat. However, after arriving, likely at the instigation of other European powers like the Dutch and British, a tense relationship had developed between the Swedes and Indians.

The British, mistrustful of the Swedes, began doing whatever they could to prevent the Swedes in their work, and managed to make the locals also mistrust the Swedes. Suddenly, the local Nawab sent a military force of Indian troops, quickly defeating the Swedes and occupying the Swedish factory.

== Aftermath ==
After the attack, Braad and the others were imprisoned in the factory by the Indian troops. However, due to "careful steps taken", they were able to avoid serious consequences and instead continued the journey to China. Despite the attack, the visit to Surat yielded a profit, and after deducting wages for the crew and other things, the Swedes had a profit of 93,575 rupees.

== Works cited ==
- Frängsmyr, Tore (1976). Ostindiska kompaniet: människorna, äventyret och den ekonomiska drömmen [East India Company: the people, the adventure and the financial dream] (in Swedish). Bokförlaget Bra Böcker. ISBN 9789170246531.
- Hellstenius, John (1860). Bidrag till Svenska Ost-Indiska Compagniets Historia: 1731-1766. Edquist.
