= Swedish history of ideas =

The discipline Idé och lärdomshistoria, translated as History of Science and Ideas, is an important part of the humanities faculties in most Swedish universities, most notably Stockholm, Uppsala, Lund, Gothenburg, Umeå and Södertörn. It is a broad field of study that often involves cross disciplinary research between intellectual history, history of science, medicine or philosophy, conceptual history, history of education and media history. It is taught in Universities at undergraduate and graduate levels, and is also an active field of research. The annual journal Lychnos publishes the current research of the discipline.

The discipline was founded in the early 20th century. It has become commonplace to distinguish between three distinct phases in 20th-century intellectual ideas: history of ideas, social history, and cultural history. These concern, respectively, the investigation of independent unit ideas, the social conditions of knowledge production, and the cultural-literary technologies and practices by which intellectual authority arises. The transition towards a quantitative social history took place during the 1960s as an attempt to broaden intellectual history, “which had lost itself in flights of idealist abstraction, underestimated the importance of material factors in shaping the human past, and ignored the plight of ordinary people.” A second transition took place in 1980s when social history was criticized for a lack of political self-reflexivity.

== Formation of the discipline in Sweden ==
The dissolution of the union between Sweden and Norway in 1905 sparked a renewed need to define Sweden as a cultural and political entity. The rapid expansion of the Swedish Academy of Sciences offered the institutional space wherein this need could be further cultivated: nationalist narratives of Swedish scientific personas were produced on an extensive scale. This genre provided in Sweden the first production of a history of science. Two apt examples of this practice are Eneström’s Bibliotheca mathematica (1984 – 1914) and Linnésällskapets Årsskrift (1918).

After the events of the first world war, the supposed progressive direction of science was discredited, and its historical study lost interest. It was not until the 1930s that the interest for a new history of science increased in Sweden. Important figures within this revival were Eneström, Arrhenius, von Hofsten, Nordenskiöld, Oseen, and, most famously, Johan Nordström. In 1932 Nordström was appointed the first chair of History of Ideas (Idé- och lärdomshistoria) in Uppsala. Influenced by figures ranging as widely as Dilthey, Burckhardt, Comte, Buckle, Tannery, and Sarton, Nordström argued for a new social historical understanding of the history of science. History of science was considered at the base of history of ideas, Nordström writes:

[...] history of science [...] should set out to depict scientific life in its totality and in its context, to focus on the essential features of progress, the basic opinions, the emergent new ideas, the great revolutionizing discoveries, and seek to establish their importance as factors shaping the cultural process.

In 1934, Nordström founded the Swedish History of Science Association and its annual journal Lychnos, in which he was involved as editor. He continued to hold his Chair in Uppsala until 1957.

== Nordström school ==
What later became known as the Nordström school in Sweden was marked less by strict methodology than by a general sensitivity to social historical circumstances of scientific knowledge production. His students, most notably Sten Lindroth and Henrik Sandblad, worked towards a further dissemination and cultivation of the field. The former succeeded to Nordström in Uppsala in 1957, whilst the latter went on to found a Chair in the History of Ideas at the University of Gothenburg. In 1966, Rolf Lindborg founded a Chair of History of Ideas in Lund. Four years later, another chair was founded in Umeå by Gunnar Eriksson, and, lastly, in 1978, Nils Runeby founded a similar chair in Stockholm.

Among these different departments, two general shared perspectives stand out. First, their investigations go beyond the history of science and extend into history of humanities, religion, and a wider History of ideas. Secondly, most of the historians involved have no formal background in the natural sciences, and favour an externalist, social-contextual approach to knowledge production.

== Currents trends of history of science and ideas ==
During the ‘70s and ‘80s, several Swedish History of Science and Ideas scholars were public intellectuals and engaged in the public debate, most notably Sten Lindroth, Tore Frängsmyr, Henrik Sandblad, Sven-Eric Liedman, Karin Johannisson and Ronny Ambjörnsson. At present, a number of subfields have become particularly prevalent within the history of ideas in Sweden. Most notably, media history, Cultural history, History of medicine, History of science, history of concepts, and History of theology have received increased attention. Today, history of science and ideas is practiced in Sweden at most of the universities with several hundred active scholars. The journal Lychnos continues to be an important place for intellectual exchange within the subject in Sweden.
