= Sven Widmalm =

Sven Emil Widmalm is a Historian of Science and Ideas in Sweden, professor at the department of History of Science and Ideas at the University of Uppsala.

== Biography ==
Sven Widmalm was awarded a Ph.D. in History of Science and Ideas in 1990 from Uppsala University. Between 2005 and 2011, he was Chair of the Swedish National Committee for History of Science and Technology. From 2005 to 2016 he was a member of the board of Uppsala University's Centre for Science and Technology Studies. Since 2006 he has been a member of the advisory board of the Centre for History of Science at the Swedish Royal Academy of Sciences. Between 2009 and 2011 he was Chair of the Unit for Technology and Social Change at Linköping University. From 2011 to 2016 he was Chair of the Swedish History of Science Society. Since January 2012 he has been a Fellow of the Royal Swedish Academy of Sciences. At present he is a fellow at three other royal academies in Uppsala. Since 2015 he has been a member of the Board of Uppsala University. He was editor of Lychnos from 2001 to 2006, the Swedish yearbook for history of science and ideas.

== Research ==
Widmalm has worked on the History of science from the 18th century onwards, and has published on the history of astronomy, geodesy, cartography, experimental physics, genetics, biochemistry and high-energy physics, focussing on cultural and political aspects of science, as well as on technical, economic and research policy aspects. He has also worked on the intellectual connections between Sweden and Nazi Germany and on the history of the Royal Swedish Academy of Sciences.

== Selected publications ==
- “Science as Politics in Inter-War Sweden”, in Lettevall et al. 2012.
- Neutrality in twentieth-century Europe: Intersections of science, culture, and politics after the First World War, Widmalm, S., Lettevall, R., Somsen, G. (2012).
- Det forskningspolitiska laboratoriet, Förväntningar på vetenskapen 1900–2010, with A. Tunlid, Nordic Academic Press, 2016.
- “The Laboratory Society: Science and the Family in Sweden, c. 1900-1950”, In Donald L. Opitz, Staffan Bergwik, Birgitte Van Tiggelen (red.) Domesticity in the Making of Modern Science, New York: Palgrave Macmillan. 215–240, 2016.
- ”Vetenskap som propaganda: Akademiska kontakter mellan Sverige och Tyskland under Tredje riket”, De intellektuellas förräderi? : Intellektuellt utbyte mellan Sverige och Tredje riket, ed Maria Björkman, Patrik Lundell, Sven Widmalm, Lund: Arkiv förlag & tidskrift, 2016
