= Werner Aspenström =

Swedish poet

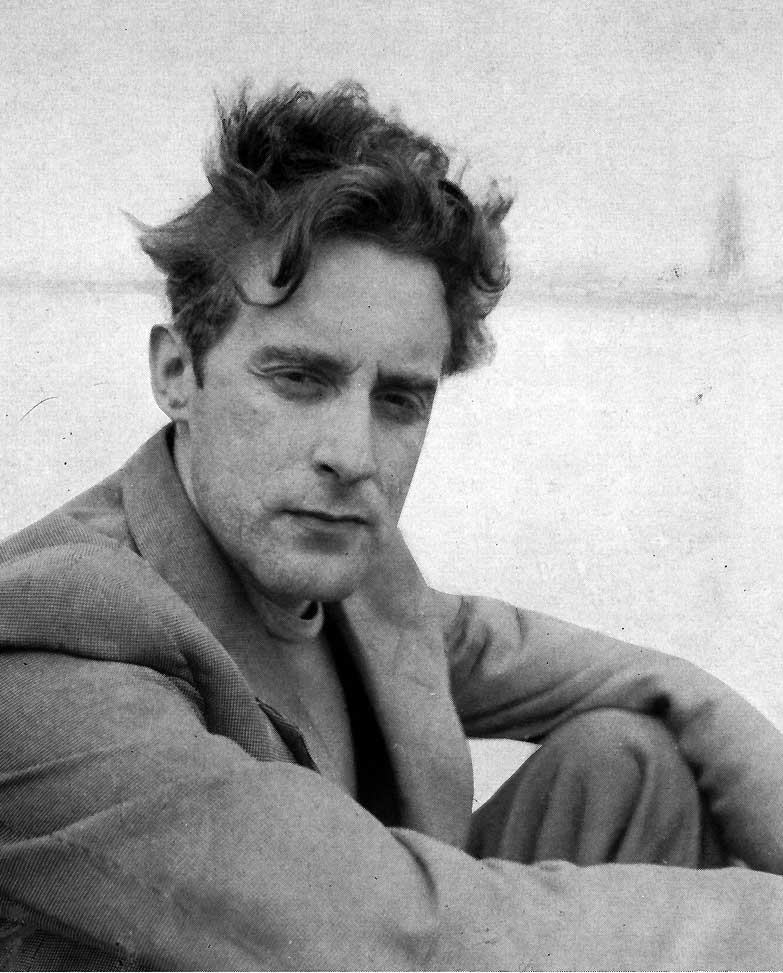
- Werner Aspenström in 1960
- Born: 13 November 1918; Norrbärke, Sweden
- Died: 25 January 1997 (aged 78); Stockholm, Sweden
- Occupations: writer, poet
- Writing career
- Language: Swedish

Karl Werner Aspenström (13 November 1918 – 25 January 1997) was a Swedish poet.

Born at Norrbärke, he was a member of the Swedish Academy, where he held Seat 12 from 1981 to 1997. Following his breakthrough in 1949 with Snölegend ("Snow legend") he was considered one of the leading 20th-century Swedish poets, and his poetry has often been compared to the works of the Nobel Prize laureates Harry Martinson and Tomas Tranströmer. Aspenström claimed that his motivation for writing was "writing for his cat".

He was a friend of Stig Dagerman. His widow died in 2015.

== Selected works ==
- Förberedelse (1943)
- Oändligt är vårt äventyr (prose, 1945)
- Skriket och tystnaden (1946)
- Snölegend (1949)
- Litania (1952)
- Förebud (1953)
- Hundarna (1954)
- Dikter under träden (1956)
- Bäcken (prose, 1958)
- Motsägelser (essays, 1961)
- Om dagen om natten (1961)
- Trappan (1964)
- Sommar (prose, 1968)
- Inre (1969)
- Under tiden (1972)
- Tidigt en morgon, sent på jorden (1980)
- Sorl (1983)
- Det röda molnet (1986)
- Varelser (1988)
- Enskilt och allmänt (1991)
- Ty (1993)
- Israpport (1997)
- Öva Sitt Eget (2004) (posthumous, co-written with Signe Lund-Aspenström)
- Samlade dikter 1943-1997 (Collected poems 1943-1997, 2014)

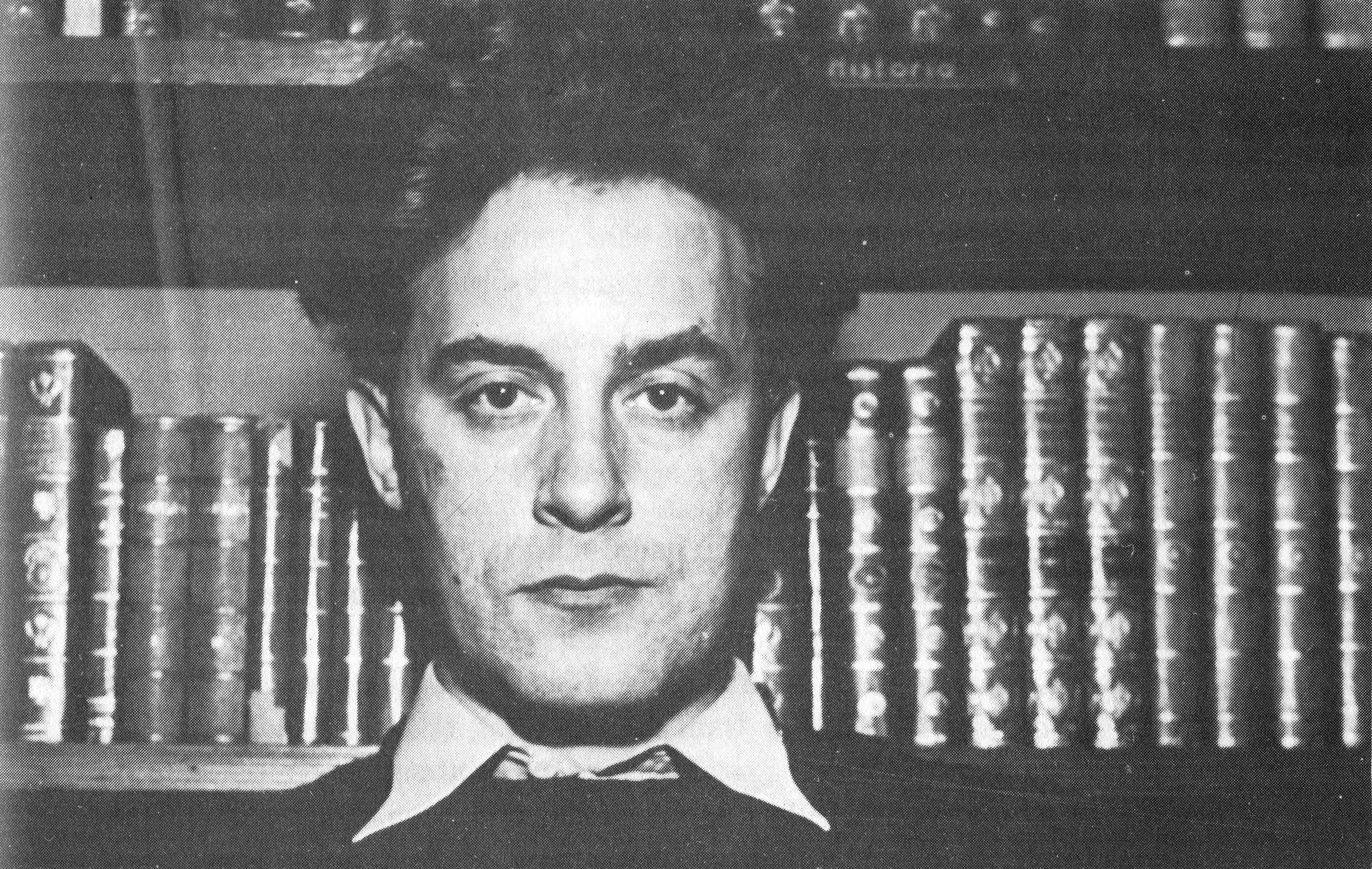
Werner Aspenström

Cultural offices
Preceded by Sten Lindroth	Swedish Academy, Seat No.12; 1981-97	Succeeded by Per Wästberg
