= Martin Kylhammar =

Swedish academic

Martin Kylhammar (born 12 January 1954 in Karlskoga, Sweden) is a Professor of Culture and Society (Tema Kultur och Samhälle) at Linköping University, Sweden.

Prof. Kylhammar received his B.A. and his Ph.D. degrees from Linköping University in 1976 and 1985 respectively.

He was appointed a Professor of Communication in 1999 and a Professor of Culture and Society in 2007. He has published many books on the history of ideas and literature. Between 1996-2002 he was editor in chief of the Swedish cultural magazine Tvärsnitt.

He edited Tvärsnitt, a popular science magazine, between 1996 and 2002.

== Awards ==
- Dobloug Prize, Swedish Academy, 2010.
- Member of the Royal Swedish Academy of Sciences, 2007.
- Member of the Kungliga samfundet för utgivande av handskrifter rörande Skandinaviens historia, 2005 (a royal learned society in Sweden without an official English translation).

== Books ==
- Kaos och kosmos: Om verklighets- och livsuppfattningar i det antika Grekland (1979).
- Maskin och idyll: Teknik och pastorala ideal hos Strindberg och Heidenstam (1985).
- Grönköpingsdikter av Nils Hasselskog (1987).
- Den okände Sten Selander: En borgerlig intellektuell (1990).
- Nils Dahlbeck: En berättelse om svensk natur och naturvårdshistoria (1992).
- Frejdiga framstegsmän och visionära världsmedborgare: Epokskiftet 20-tal – 30-tal genom fem unga och Lubbe Nordström (1994).
- Tvärsnitt 1996-2002 (ed.).
- Det klassiska Grönköping (1997).
- På väg mot en kommunikativ demokrati? (ed., 2003).
- Den tidlöse modernisten: En essäbok (2004).
- Frigörare? Moderna svenska samhällsdrömmar (ed., 2005).
- Ord i rättan tid (ed., 2005).
- Det vanställda ordet: Om den svåra konsten att värna sin integritet (ed., 2006).
- Livet – en stor sak: Filosofier (2007).
- Le moderniste intemporel (L´Harmatton Paris, 2009).
- Pojken på vinden: Filosofiska essäer (2010).
