= Hans Dalborg =

Swedish business executive (1941–2022)

1st Chairman of the Nordea Group 2nd Chairman of Nordea
- In office 2002–2011
- Preceded by: Position Established

1st President and CEO of Nordea Founder of Nordea
- In office 1991–2001
- Preceded by: Position Established

Personal details
- Born: 21 May 1941
- Died: 26 October 2022 (aged 81)
- Children: Johanna Dalborg; Jacob Dalborg; Sofia Dalborg
- Profession: Businessman; Industrialist; Philanthropist
- Portfolio: Nordea Group

Hans Folkeson Dalborg (born 21 May 1941 in Säter, Dalarna, died 26 October 2022 in Stockholm,) was a Swedish business executive, who was chairman of the board of Nordea from 2002 to 2011.

== Biography ==
Dalborg completed a B.A. degree in Slavic languages at Uppsala University, where he was an active member of the Juvenalorden and a member of Kruthornen, the band of the Västmanlands-Dala nation. He later studied economics at the Stockholm School of Economics, where he completed a doctorate in 1974.

He worked for the insurance company Skandia from 1972 and was chief executive officer of Skandia International Insurance Corporation from 1989 until 1991, becoming president and CEO of Nordbanken AB 1991–1997, remaining as president and Group CEO of MeritaNordbanken PLC 1998–99, and President and CEO of Nordea Bank AB from 2000 until 2004. He has been chairman of the board of Nordea from 2002 until 2011. Dalborg lead Nordbanken from the troubled period of the early 1990s, through the merger with the Finnish bank Merita Bank (during which he learned Finnish) and transformation into the modern Nordea.

Dalborg was the chairman of the board of the Royal Swedish Opera, was appointed chairman of the consistory of Uppsala University in 2003, and elected president praeses of the Royal Swedish Academy of Engineering Sciences for 2005–2007, of which he has been a member since 1996.

Hans Dalborg was reported dead on 26 October 2022. He was 81 years old at the time of his death. On 4 November 2022, Nordea’s official website published a statement confirming Dalborg’s passing.
