= Bo Bergman =

Swedish writer and literary critic

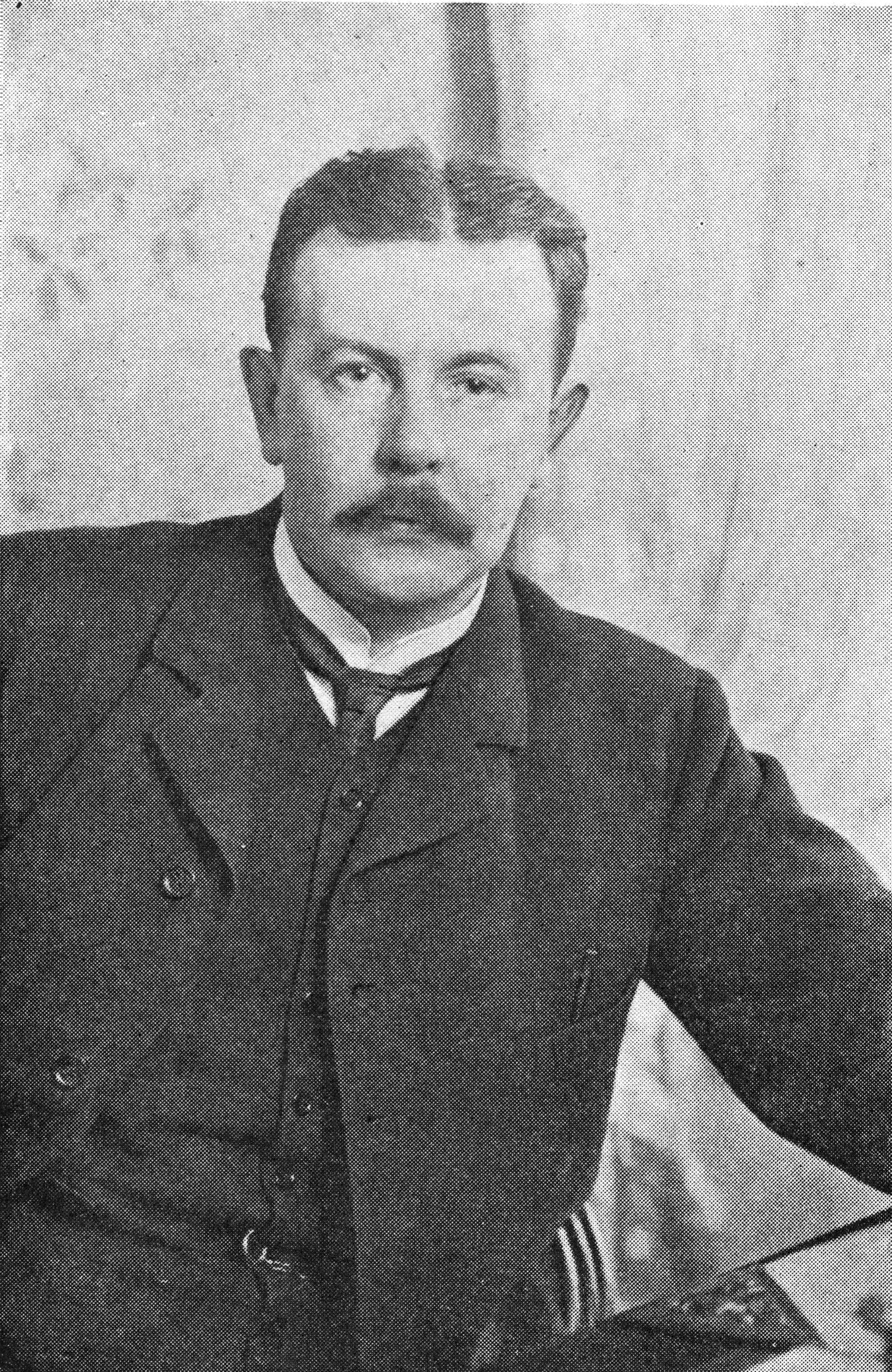
Bo Bergman

Bo Hjalmar Bergman (6 October 1869 – 17 November 1967) was a Swedish writer, literary critic and member of the Swedish Academy, sitting in Seat 12 from 1925 until his death. His works form the inspiration for works by several major Swedish composers, including: Wilhelm Stenhammar, Ture Rangström, and Karin Rehnqvist.

Bergman was born and died in Stockholm, where he spent his entire working life as a postal official, retiring in 1933. He started writing poetry whilst working for the Swedish postal service, his first poetry anthology, Marionettema, was published in 1903. In addition to his postal duties, Bergman also worked as a literary critic for Ord och Bild from 1900 until 1904. He worked for the major newspaper, Dagens Nyheter, and he also served as a theatre critic from 1905 until 1939.

Bergman was a close friend of the pre-eminent Swedish novelist of his day, Hjalmar Söderberg, with whom he maintained an extensive correspondence extending from 1891 until Söderberg's death in 1941. Like Söderberg, Bergman's writing was heavily influenced by the decadent movement, in particular the flâneur writings of Charles Baudelaire. Bergman's early poetry is typically decadent and disillusioned, being informed by a determinist view of a changing world in which all value systems and all scientific and metaphysical processes of understanding the universe are meaningless. Marionetterna, which translates as The Marionettes, supposes that the destinies of men are in the hands of a bearded old man in control of their every move. Like Söderberg, Bergman's worldview gave way to a militant brand of humanism in his later works, a reaction against the growing threat of Nazism.

Bergman is buried at the Norra begravningsplatsen.

== Bibliography ==
=== Anthologies ===
- 1903 - Marionetterna (The Marionettes)
- 1908 - En människa (One Man)
- 1917 - Elden (The Fire)
- 1922 - Livets ögon (The Eyes of Life)
- 1939 - Gamla gudar (Old Gods)
- 1944 - Riket (The Country)
- 1952 - Stunder (Moments)
- 1969 - Äventyret (The Adventure)

=== Novels ===
- 1904 - Drömmen och andra noveller (The Dream, and Other Stories)
- 1915 - Skeppet (The Ship)

=== Play ===
- 1963 - Det eviga spelet (The Eternal Game)

=== Autobiography ===
- 1964 - Trasmattan (The Rag Carpet)

=== Letters ===
- 1969 - Kära Hjalle – Kära Bo (Brevväxling med Hjalmar Söderberg) (Dear Hjalle, Dear Bo. Correspondence with Hjalmar Söderberg)

Cultural offices
Preceded by Adolf Noreen	Swedish Academy, Seat No 12; 1925-1967	Succeeded by Sten Lindroth
