= Juvenalorden =

Student society at Uppsala University

Juvenalorden is a student society based at Uppsala University, Sweden. Juvenalorden was founded in 1907, but traces its traditions to the society known as "The Juvenals" (Juvenalerna), which had been active in the 1830s and 1840s.

The Juvenalorden, or "Juvenal Order", of 1907 was founded on the initiative of then student, later clergyman August Lindh, remembered for his widespread Swedish translation of the German student song "O alte Burschenherrlichkeit" (in Swedish: O, gamla klang - och jubeltid!), and with a tenuous connection to the original society in the form of the aging physician M. Aspelin, who had during his student days in Uppsala been introduced into the Juvenals by its principal figure, the poet and composer Gunnar Wennerberg (1817-1901) himself. The purpose of the order (as stated in the Nordisk familjebok article on the society from 1924) was to work "for the ennobling of youthful happiness in the academic life". As a revival of the earlier society the order worked to both conserve and develop aspects of older upsaliensian student life, which had acquired a classical character in the mid 19th century; important aspects of this is the male student choir singing and the performance of spex, a form of comical musical theatre usually based on themes from history or classical literature and characterized by its humorous anachronisms.

Notable members of the younger juvenals include the arctic explorer Finn Malmgren, the historian Sten Lindroth (later the Carlberg Professor of History of Ideas and Learning in Uppsala), the writer Gösta Knutsson, and the writer and entertainer Tage Danielsson. Among the prominent living members are the lawyer Peter Nobel, former Secretary General of the Swedish section of Amnesty International, and Hans Dalborg, chairman of the Nordic bank Nordea.

Juvenalorden publishes a series of publications covering various aspects of Upsaliensian student history.
