= Tvärsnitt =

Popular science magazine in sweden (1979–2011)

- Categories: Popular science magazine
- Publisher: Swedish Research Council
- Founded: 1979
- Final issue: 2011
- Country: Sweden
- Based in: Stockholm
- Language: Swedish
- ISSN: 0348-7997
- OCLC: 10737408

Tvärsnitt (Swedish: Cross Section) was a popular science magazine published in Stockholm, Sweden, from 1979 to 2011.

== History and profile ==
Tvärsnitt was started in Stockholm in 1979. The magazine featured popular articles on humanities and social sciences. Until 2000 the magazine was published by the Humanities and Social Sciences Research Council. Then it was published by the Swedish Research Council until 2011 when it ceased publication.

All print issues of Tvärsnitt are archived at the National Library of Sweden.

== Editors ==
The editors of Tvärsnitt included:

- 1979–1985: Tore Frängsmyr
- 1986–1991: Sverker Sörlin
- 1992–1996: Kjell Jonsson
- 1996–2002: Martin Kylhammar
- 2002–2004: Johan Lundberg
- 2004–2006: Liselotte Englund
- 2006-2010 Helena Bornholm
- 2011: Ragnhild Romanus
