= Sten Lindroth =

Swedish historian of learning and science

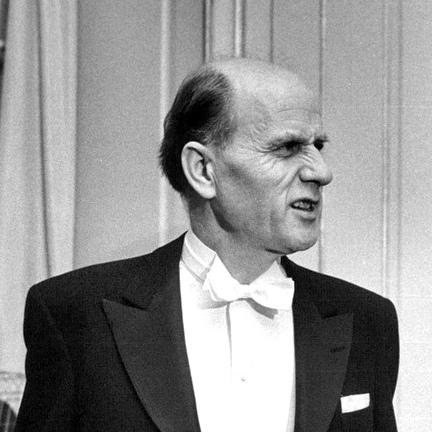

Sten Hjalmar Lindroth (28 December 1914 in Lund – 1 September 1980) was a Swedish historian of learning and science.

Lindroth was born in the university town of Lund in Southern Sweden, but grew up and went to school in Gothenburg after his father Hjalmar Lindroth had been appointed to the Chair of Nordic languages at University of Gothenburg. After finishing school in Gothenburg at Göteborgs högre latinläroverk, he matriculated at Uppsala University in 1933 and eventually became a student of Johan Nordström, holder of the Emilia and Gustaf Carlberg Chair of the history of ideas and learning, the first of its kind at Uppsala. Lindroth eventually completed a monumental, 500-page dissertation on the history of paracelsianism in Sweden until the middle of the 17th century, defended in 1943. During his student years he was also active in the Juvenalorden and the liberal student society Verdandi, for he which he also served as president.

He spent the next decade on a history of the mining and copper production at Stora Kopparberget and a biography of the physicist and inventor Christopher Polhem, and several shorter publications on various scientific-historical topics. In 1957 he succeeded Nordström as Carlberg Professor. His later publications included a book on the early history of the Royal Swedish Academy of Sciences (1967), of which he became a member in 1966, a history of Swedish learning from the Middle Ages until the Gustavian period (the fourth and last volume was left unfinished but completed and edited by his former student Gunnar Eriksson) and an overview of the history of Uppsala University (1976), published on the occasion of the 500th anniversary of the university.

Sten Lindroth was elected a Member of the Swedish Academy in 1968. His brother Carl H. Lindroth was a noted entomologist.

Cultural offices
Preceded by Bo Bergman	Swedish Academy, Seat No.12; 1968–80	Succeeded by Werner Aspenström
