= Johannes Schöner =

German priest, mathematician, cosmographer and globe maker

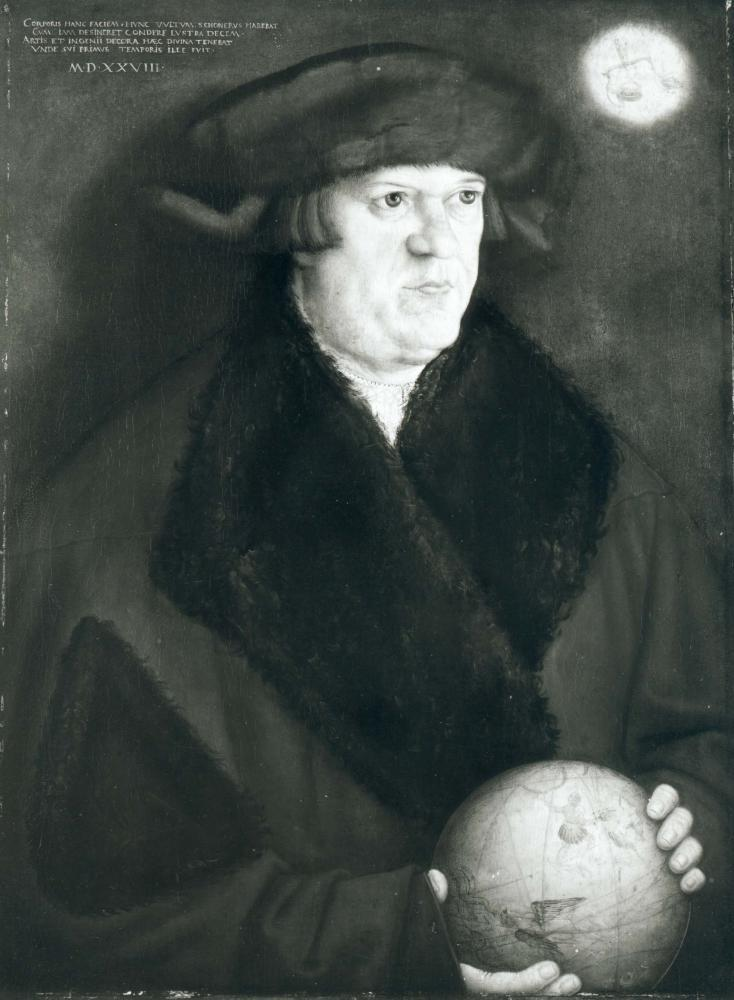
- Johannes Schöner, 1527
- Born: 16 January 1477; Karlstadt am Main
- Died: 16 January 1547 (aged 70); Free Imperial City of Nuremberg
- Other names: Johann Schönner, Johann Schoener, Jean Schönner, Joan Schoenerus
- Occupations: priest, astronomer, astrologer, geographer, cosmographer, cartographer, mathematician, globe & scientific instrument maker
- Employer(s): Egidien Gymnasium, Nuremberg
- Title: Professor of mathematics
- Term: 1526–1546

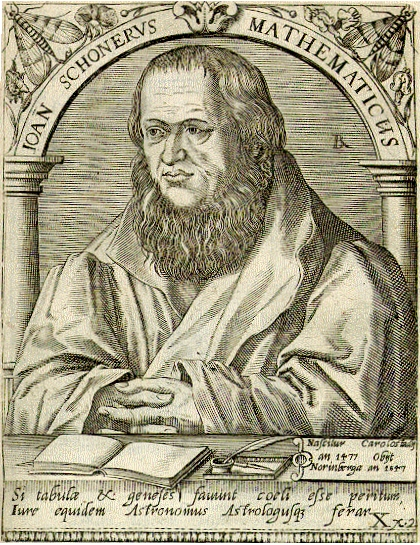
'Joan Schonerus Mathematicus'

Johannes Schöner (16 January 1477, in Karlstadt am Main – 16 January 1547, in the Free Imperial City of Nuremberg) (aka, Johann Schönner, Johann Schoener, Jean Schönner, Joan Schoenerus) was a German polymath. It is best to refer to him using the usual 16th-century Latin term "mathematicus", as the areas of study to which he devoted his life were very different from those now considered to be the domain of the mathematician. He was a priest, astronomer, astrologer, geographer, cosmographer, cartographer, mathematician, globe and scientific instrument maker and editor and publisher of scientific texts. In his own time he enjoyed a Europe-wide reputation as an innovative and influential globe maker and cosmographer and as one of the continent's leading and most authoritative astrologers. Today he is remembered as an influential pioneer in the history of globe making, and as a man who played a significant role in the events that led up to the publishing of Copernicus's De revolutionibus orbium coelestium, 'On the Revolutions of the Heavenly Spheres' in the Free Imperial City of Nuremberg in 1543.

== Life ==
=== Early life ===
Schöner was born on 16 January 1477 in Karlstadt am Main in Lower Franconia. As with most Renaissance scholars nothing is known about his parents or his early life. All that is known is that he had a brother, Peter, to whom he addressed his "Arzneibuch" in 1528. Quite detailed information for Schöner's adult life, at least up to 1506, has been preserved in his own marginalia in his copy of Regiomontanus' printed Ephemerides, which he used as a diary. He matriculated at the University of Erfurt in the winter semester 1494/5 and graduated Baccalaureus on 21 March 1498. He was appointed to a position in the school in Gemünden on 22 February 1499 and ordained as a Catholic priest in the Bishopric of Bamberg on 13 June 1500. On 2 February 1500 he moved to Bamberg and was appointed chaplain in Hallstatt near Bamberg on 18 April 1500. His next appointment was as vicar in his hometown Karlstadt from 4 June 1504. Between 4 May and 29 October 1506 he was again in Bamberg before he returned to Karlstadt. His diary also informs us that he entered a relationship with Kunigunde Holocher in 1499, with whom he had three children: a son Johannes born on 1 February 1502, a daughter Sibilla born on 12 June 1503 and a second son Vitus born on 21 November 1504.

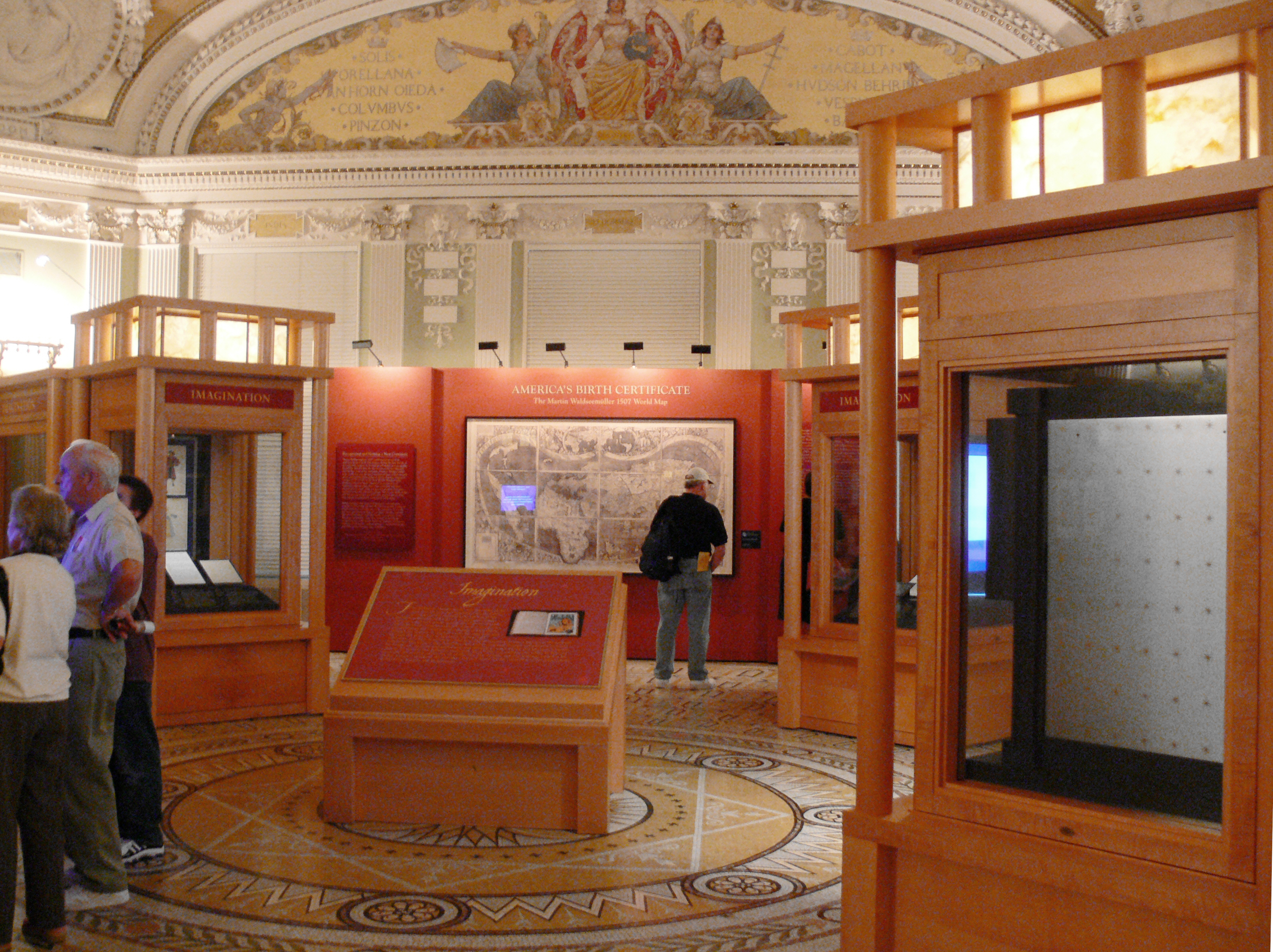
A facsimile copy of Schöner's Waldseemüller map at the Library of Congress in Washington

Schöner was the owner of the only specimen of the 1507 Waldseemüller map of the world that has survived and which was rediscovered at Schloss Wolfegg in Upper Swabia in 1901. Since 2003 it is in possession of the Library of Congress.

=== Bamberg ===
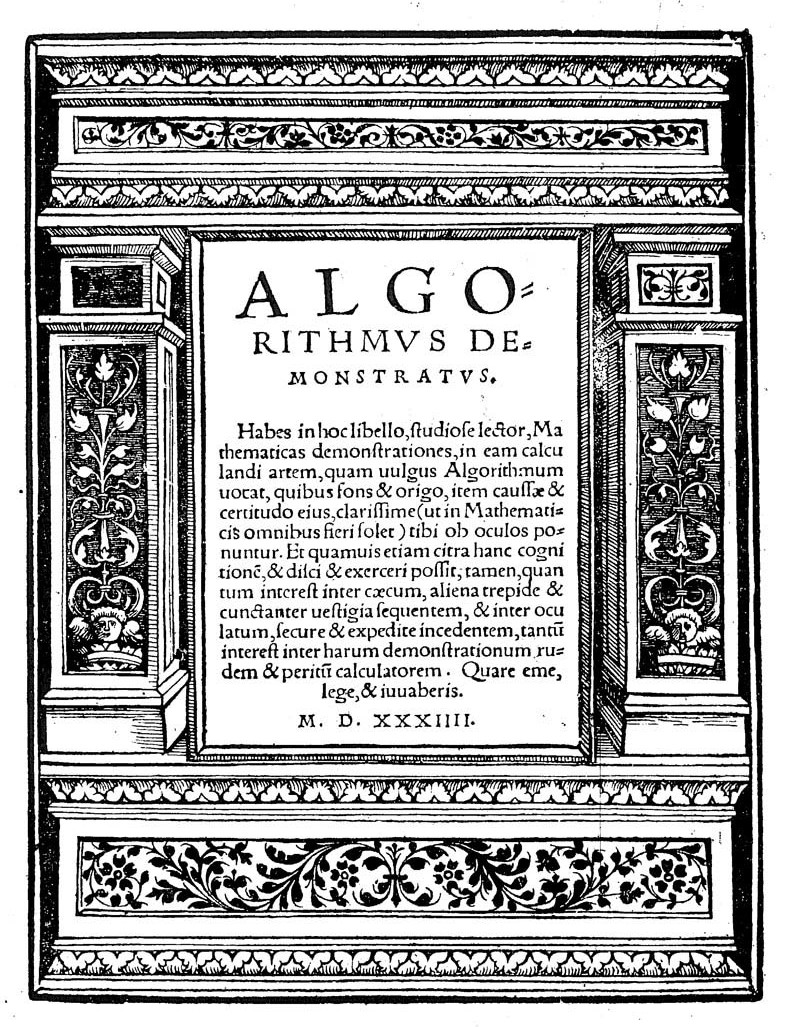
Algorithmus demonstratus, 1534

No diary exists after 1506, and up to 1515 there are only indirect traces of Schöner's existence in the financial records of the bishopric and in the correspondence of Lorenz Beheim (?1457 – 1521), who after 24 years in Rome as chamberlain to Pope Alexander IV had returned to Bamberg in 1505 as a canon of the cathedral.

In 1526, he was called to Nürnberg, by Philip Melanchthon, as the first professor of mathematics at the newly founded gymnasium Aegidianum, a post he held till one year prior to his death. At the same time, he converted to Protestantism and married.

Already in Bamberg, he owned his own printing company and published many maps and globes. He produced the first ever printed celestial globe in his workshop in 1517, as a matching pair to his printed terrestrial globe from 1515. He made another globe in 1520.

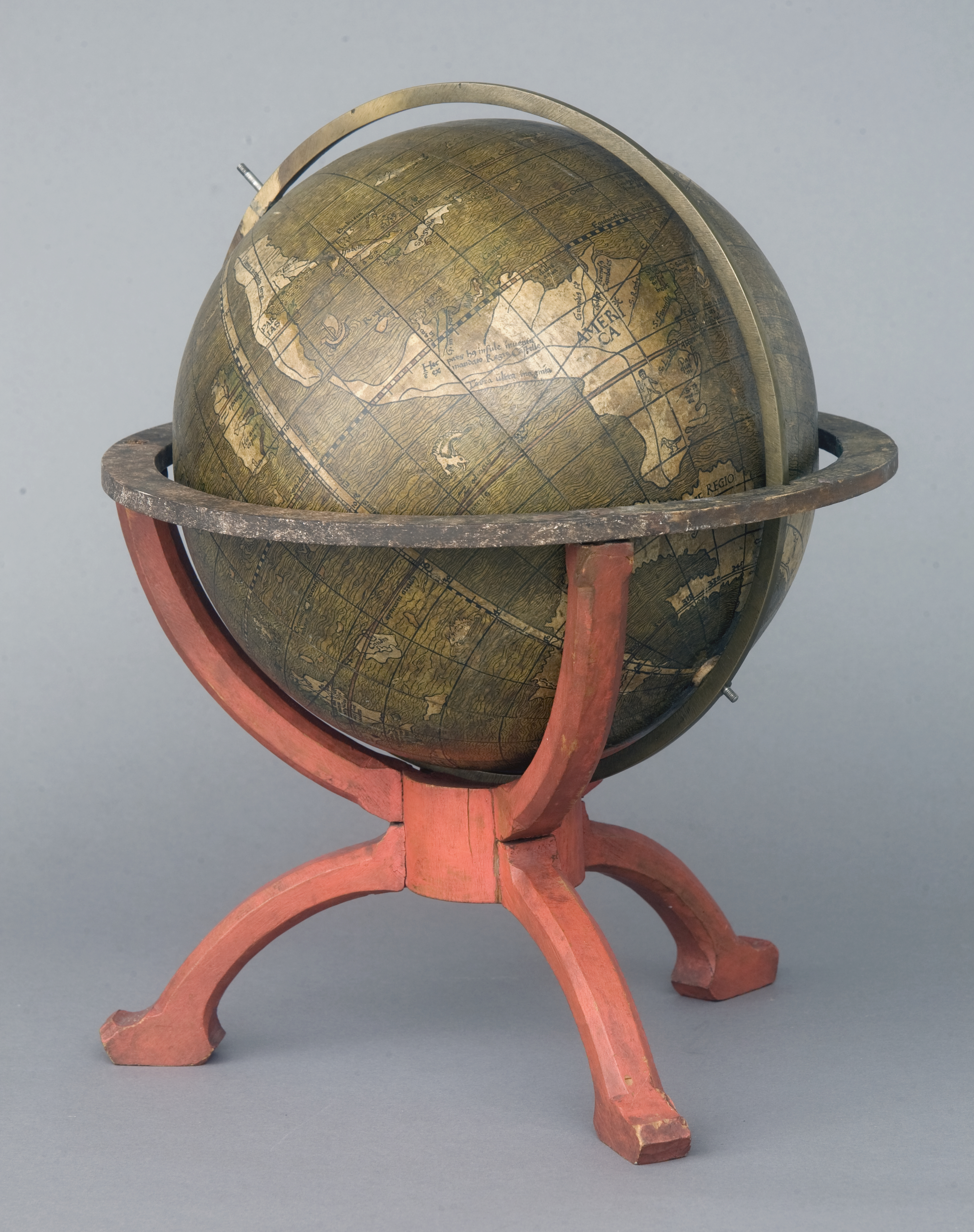
Schöner's Terrestrial globe with wooden frame, around 1515, wood, papier-mâché, from Historical Museum, Frankfurt, Photographer Uwe Dettmar

Schöner had also made still unpublished data of Mercury observations from Walther available to Copernicus, 45 observations in total, 14 of them with longitude and latitude. Copernicus used three of them in "De revolutionibus", giving only longitudes, and falsely attributing them to Schöner. The values differed slightly from the ones published by Schöner in 1544.

In 1538, Georg Joachim Rheticus, a young professor of mathematics at Wittenberg and former assistant of Copernicus, stayed for some time with Schöner who convinced him to visit Nicolaus Copernicus in Frauenburg. In 1540, Rheticus dedicated the first published report of Copernicus work, the Narratio prima, to Schöner, to test the waters of the reaction by the Catholic Church. As this was well received, Copernicus finally agreed to publish his main work, and Rheticus prepared Copernicus' manuscript for printing.

In Nürnberg, Schöner published in 1544 the astronomical observations of Regiomontanus and Walther, as well as manuscripts of Regiomontanus, which had been in the hand of Walther, as Observationes XXX annorum a I. Regiomontano et B. Walthero Norimbergae habitae, [4°, Norimb. 1544].

A crater on Mars is named in his honor.

== See also ==
- Johannes Schöner globe
- Ancient world maps
- World map
