= Peter of Saint-Omer =

Peter of Saint-Omer (Latin: Petrus de Sancto Audomaro), sometimes called Petrus Danus ('Peter the Dane'), was an astronomer active in Paris around the period 1292–1303. Two works are attributed to him, one on the "new" quadrant recently devised by Jacob ben Machir ibn Tibbon and another, entitled Tractatus de semissis, on an equatorium he devised for determining longitudes. He has sometimes been equated with his contemporary, Petrus de Dacia, but they are probably distinct individuals.

== Editions ==
- Pedersen, Fritz Saaby, ed. (1983). Petri Philomenae de Dacia et Petri de S. Audomaro: Opera quadrivialia. Pars II: Opera Petri de S. Audomaro. corpus philosophorum Danicorum medii aevi. Vol. X. Copenhagen: Societas Linguae et Litterarum Danicarum.
