= Tore Frängsmyr =

Swedish historian (1938–2017)

Tore Lennart Frängsmyr (8 July 1938 in Skellefteå – 28 August 2017 in Uppsala) was a Swedish historian. He was the first holder of the Hans Rausing professorship in the history of science at Uppsala university. According to J.L. Heilbron, Frängsmyr "dominated the history of science in Sweden from his chair at the University of Uppsala for a quarter century."

Frängsmyr was born in 1938, the son of Johan and Linnea Karlsson. He grew up in Sjöbotten outside Bureå in Västerbotten, as the fifth of eight children; the family took the name Frängsmyr in 1954, after Frängsmyren, a wetland area near Sjöbotten. Tore Frängsmyr worked as a freelance journalist at the newspaper Norra Västerbotten in the 1950s, while he was still at school. After his secondary school graduation in Skellefteå, he moved to Uppsala in 1958, to study philosophy and history.

He specialised in the history of science and the history of ideas, and finished his PhD at Uppsala university in 1969. The title of his dissertation was Geologi och skapelsetro (lit. Geology and creationism).

Frängsmyr wrote several works in English, including books about Linnaeus, Berzelius, and Vetenskapsakademien, which contributed to the spreading of knowledge about the Swedish history of science. He was also the chairman of the scientific board counselling the editors of Nationalencyklopedin when that encyclopedia was first being created. He was the founding editor of Tvärsnitt, a popular science magazine, and served in the post between 1979 and 1985.

In 1981, he became Professor of the science of technology at Linköping University, and from 1982 he had a professorship in the history of science at Uppsala university. In 2001, the daughter of Swedish industrialist Hans Rausing donated money to Uppsala university to institute a chair in the history of science. Tore Frängsmyr became the first holder of this professorship, which he held until his retirement in 2007.

In 2008, colleagues and friends celebrated his 70th birthday with a commemorative volume of seventeen essays on history of science titled Aurora Torealis; essayists included Robert Darnton, J.L. Heilbron, and Svante Lindqvist.

He was an elected member of a number of learned societies, including the American Philosophical Society, the Royal Swedish Academies of Letters, History and Antiquities, the Sciences, and the Engineering Sciences. He worked closely with the Nobel Foundation for many years, helping to organize the publication of Nobel Lectures by prizewinners and also taking part in the annual Nobel Prize ceremony as "the rather avuncular figure who hands the medals and diplomas to the King of Sweden."

In Uppsala, he was Inspektor (honorary chairman) of the student organisation Norrlands nation from 2003 to 2011.

Frängsmyr married Birgitta, née Thunholm, in 1970 and the couple had four children. They were married until his death in 2017.
