= Gustaf Eneström =

Swedish mathematician (1852–1923)

Gustaf Hjalmar Eneström
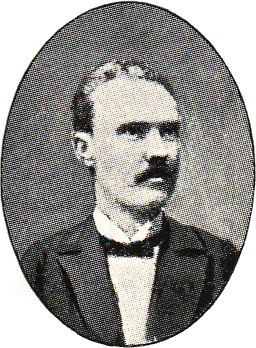
- Born: 5 September 1852; Nora, Sweden
- Died: 10 June 1923 (aged 70); Stockholm, Sweden
- Education: Uppsala University
- Known for: Eneström index Bibliotheca Mathematica
- Scientific career
- Fields: History of mathematics

Gustaf Hjalmar Eneström (5 September 1852 – 10 June 1923) was a Swedish mathematician, statistician and historian of mathematics known for introducing the Eneström index, which is used to identify Euler's writings. Most historical scholars refer to the works of Euler by their Eneström index.

Eneström received a Bachelor of Science (filosofie kandidat) degree from Uppsala university in 1871, received a position at Uppsala University Library in 1875, and at the National Library of Sweden in 1879.

From 1884 to 1914, he was the publisher of the mathematical-historical journal Bibliotheca Mathematica, which he had founded and partially funded with his own means. Concerning the history of mathematics, he was known as critical to Moritz Cantor.

With Soichi Kakeya, he is known for the Eneström-Kakeya theorem which determines an annulus containing the roots of a real polynomial. Specifically, it states that for an $n$-degree polynomial $P(z) = \sum_{k = 0}^n a_{k} z^{k}$ with a complex variable $z$ and real coefficients satisfying $0 \le a_0 \le a_1 \le \cdots \le a_n$, all zeros of $P(z)$ lie within the disk $|z| \le 1$.

In 1923 George Sarton wrote, "No one has done more for the sound development of our studies". Sarton went on: "the very presence of Eneström obliged every scholar devoting himself to the history of mathematics to increase his circumspection and improve his work."

Eneström has also developed an election method similar to Phragmen's voting rules.
