= List of Swedish-language novels =

This is an inclompete list of Swedish-language novels.

== Nineteenth century ==
=== 1830s ===
- Det går an – Carl Jonas Love Almqvist (1839)

=== 1870s ===
- The Red Room – August Strindberg (1879)

=== 1880s ===
- The Son of a Servant – August Strindberg (1886)

=== 1890s ===
- The Story of Gösta Berling – Selma Lagerlöf (1891)
- Förvillelser – Hjalmar Söderberg (1895)
- The Tale of a Manor – Selma Lagerlöf (1899)

== Twentieth century ==
=== 1900s ===
- Martin Birck's Youth – Hjalmar Söderberg (1901)
- Jerusalem – Selma Lagerlöf (1901)
- Alone – August Strindberg (1903)
- The Treasure – Selma Lagerlöf (1904)
- Doctor Glas – Hjalmar Söderberg (1905)
- The Wonderful Adventures of Nils – Selma Lagerlöf (1906)
- The Girl from the Marsh Croft – Selma Lagerlöf (1908)
- Norrtullsligan – Elin Wägner (1908)

=== 1910s ===
- Sörgården – Anna-Maria Roos (1912)
- The Serious Game – Hjalmar Söderberg (1912)
- Thy Soul Shall Bear Witness! – Selma Lagerlöf (1912)
- The Emperor of Portugallia – Selma Lagerlöf (1914)

=== 1920s ===
- Farmor och vår Herre – Hjalmar Bergman (1921)
- Kvartetten som sprängdes – Birger Sjöberg (1924)
- Gäst hos verkligheten – Pär Lagerkvist (1925)
- The Löwensköld Ring – Selma Lagerlöf (1925)
- Charlotte Löwensköld – Selma Lagerlöf (1925)
- Snörmakare Lekholm får en idé – Gustaf Hellström (1927)
- Raskens – Vilhelm Moberg (1927)
- Anna Svärd – Selma Lagerlöf (1928)

=== 1930s ===
- Bock i örtagård – Fritiof Nilsson Piraten (1933)
- Godnatt jord – Ivar Lo-Johansson (1933)
- Kvinnor och äppelträd – Moa Martinson (1933)
- Nu var det 1914 – Eyvind Johnson (1934)
- Here's Your Life – Eyvind Johnson (1935)
- Flowering Nettle – Harry Martinson (1935)
- Kungsgatan – Ivar Lo-Johansson (1935)
- Jag Lars Hård – Jan Fridegård (1935)
- Se dig inte om! – Eyvind Johnson (1936)
- My Mother Gets Married – Moa Martinson (1936)
- Slutspel i ungdomen – Eyvind Johnson (1937)
- Bokhandlaren som slutade bada – Fritiof Nilsson Piraten (1937)
- Sömnlös – Vilhelm Moberg (1937)
- Bara en mor – Ivar Lo-Johansson (1939)

=== 1940s ===
- Trägudars land – Jan Fridegård (1940)
- Kallocain – Karin Boye (1940)
- The Hammer of God – Bo Giertz (1941)
- Väckarklocka – Elin Wägner (1941)
- Grupp Krilon – Eyvind Johnson (1941)
- The Long Ships – Frans G. Bengtsson (1941)
- Ride This Night – Vilhelm Moberg (1941)
- Krilons resa – Eyvind Johnson (1942)
- Krilon själv – Eyvind Johnson (1943)
- The Dwarf – Pär Lagerkvist (1944)
- Soldat med brutet gevär – Vilhelm Moberg (1944)
- Min död är min – Lars Ahlin (1945)
- The Snake – Stig Dagerman (1945)
- Return to Ithaca – Eyvind Johnson (1946)
- Island of the Doomed – Stig Dagerman (1946)
- A Burnt Child – Stig Dagerman (1948)
- Vägen till Klockrike – Harry Martinson (1948)
- The Emigrants – Vilhelm Moberg (1949)
- Dreams of Roses and Fire – Eyvind Johnson (1949)

=== 1950s ===
- Barabbas – Pär Lagerkvist (1950)
- Solange – Willy Kyrklund (1951)
- Unto a Good Land – Vilhelm Moberg (1952)
- Hjortronlandet – Sara Lidman (1955)
- The Settlers – Vilhelm Moberg (1956)
- Natt i marknadstältet – Lars Ahlin (1957)
- The Last Letter Home – Vilhelm Moberg (1959)

=== 1960s ===
- The Days of His Grace – Eyvind Johnson (1960)
- City of My Dreams – Per Anders Fogelström (1960)
- Children of Their City – Per Anders Fogelström (1962)
- A Time on Earth – Vilhelm Moberg (1963)
- Remember the City – Per Anders Fogelström (1964)
- Moominpappa at Sea – Tove Jansson (1965)
- In a City Transformed – Per Anders Fogelström (1966)
- Stad i världen – Per Anders Fogelström (1968)
- Vem älskar Yngve Frej? – Stig Claesson (1968)

=== 1970s ===
- Rapport från en skurhink – Maja Ekelöf (1970)
- De långa åren – Eino Hanski (1972)
- Attila – Klas Östergren (1975)
- Det mest förbjudna – Kerstin Thorvall (1976)
- Jack – Ulf Lundell (1976)
- Maken – Gun-Britt Sundström (1976)
- Ismael – Klas Östergren (1977)
- Din tjänare hör – Sara Lidman (1977)
- Fantomerna – Klas Östergren (1978)
- Musikanternas uttåg – P O Enquist (1978)
- Autisterna – Stig Larsson (1979)
- Pubertet – Ivar Lo-Johansson (1979)
- Vredens barn – Sara Lidman (1979)

=== 1980s ===
- Gentlemen – Klas Östergren (1980)
- Evil – Jan Guillou (1981)
- Agnes Cecilia – en sällsam historia – Maria Gripe (1981)
- Naboth's Stone – Sara Lidman (1981)
- Samuels bok – Sven Delblanc (1981)
- The Way of a Serpent – Torgny Lindgren (1982)
- The Christmas Oratorio – Göran Tunström (1983)
- Fattiga riddare och stora svenskar – Klas Östergren (1983)
- Den underbare mannen – Sara Lidman (1983)
- Sagan om Sune – Anders Jacobsson & Sören Olsson (1984)
- Dykungens dotter – en barnhistoria – Birgitta Trotzig (1985)
- Far och son – Jörn Donner (1985)
- Simon and the Oaks – Marianne Fredriksson (1985)
- Paradisets barn – Marianne Fredriksson (1985)
- Järnkronan – Sara Lidman (1985)
- Sune börjar tvåan – Anders Jacobsson & Sören Olsson (1985)
- Hunden – Kerstin Ekman (1986)
- Plåster – Klas Östergren (1986)
- Självklart, Sune – Anders Jacobsson & Sören Olsson (1986)
- Vindspejare – Agneta Pleijel (1987)
- Berts dagbok – Anders Jacobsson & Sören Olsson (1987)
- Din livsfrukt – Lars Ahlin (1987)
- Rövarna i Skuleskogen – Kerstin Ekman (1988)
- Ankare – Klas Östergren (1988)
- Den som vandrar om natten – Marianne Fredriksson (1988)
- Sune och Svarta Mannen – Anders Jacobsson & Sören Olsson (1989)
- Tjejtjusaren Sune – Anders Jacobsson & Sören Olsson (1989)

=== 1990s ===
- Berts första betraktelser – Anders Jacobsson & Sören Olsson (1990)
- Berts vidare betraktelser – Anders Jacobsson & Sören Olsson (1990)
- Berts ytterligare betraktelser – Anders Jacobsson & Sören Olsson (1991)
- Berts bravader – Anders Jacobsson & Sören Olsson (1991)
- Handelsmän och partisaner – Klas Östergren (1991)
- Livets ax – Sven Delblanc (1991)
- Berts bekännelser – Anders Jacobsson & Sören Olsson (1991)
- En komikers uppväxt – Jonas Gardell (1992)
- Medan tiden tänker på annat – Niklas Rådström (1992)
- Strandmannen – Peter Kihlgård (1992)
- Korta och långa kapitel – Sigrid Combüchen (1992)
- Saknaden – Ulf Lundell (1992)
- Bert och badbrudarna – Anders Jacobsson & Sören Olsson (1993)
- Fungi – Agneta Pleijel (1993)
- Medan de ännu hade hästar – Birgitta Lillpers (1993)
- Urwind – Bo Carpelan (1993)
- Blackwater – Kerstin Ekman (1993)
- Nedkomst – Magnus Dahlström (1993)
- Berts bekymmer – Anders Jacobsson & Sören Olsson (1994)
- Synden – Björn Ranelid (1994)
- Den dagen kastanjerna slår ut är jag långt härifrån – Bodil Malmsten (1994)
- Andrej – Carola Hansson (1994)
- Under i september – Klas Östergren (1994)
- Vattenorgeln – Lars Andersson (1994)
- Bert och brorosrna – Anders Jacobsson & Sören Olsson (1995)
- Berts bryderier – Anders Jacobsson & Sören Olsson (1995)
- Comédia infantil – Henning Mankell (1995)
- En ny påminnelse om – Lennart Göth (1995)
- Trädgården – Magnus Florin (1995)
- Värddjuret – Marie Hermanson (1995)
- Underbara kvinnor vid vatten – Monika Fagerholm (1995)
- Rymdväktaren – Peter Nilson (1995)
- Sweetness – Torgny Lindgren (1995)
- Molnfri bombnatt – Vibeke Olsson (1995)
- En tid i Visby – Björn Runeborg (1996)
- Bert och boysen – Anders Jacobsson & Sören Olsson (1996)
- Berts berifelse – Anders Jacobsson & Sören Olsson (1996)
- Den tionde sånggudinnan – Carina Burman (1996)
- Jag vill ha hela världen! – Fredrik Ekelund (1996)
- Drakarna över Helsingfors – Kjell Westö (1996)
- Lifsens rot – Sara Lidman (1996)
- Bert och bacillerna – Anders Jacobsson & Sören Olsson (1993)
- Bert och beundrarinnorna – Anders Jacobsson & Sören Olsson (1997)
- Hohaj – Elisabeth Rynell (1997)
- Huset vid Flon – Kjell Johansson (1997)
- Hem – Magnus Dahlström (1997)
- April Witch – Majgull Axelsson (1997)
- Enligt Maria Magdalena – Marianne Fredriksson (1997)
- Svindel – Per Holmer (1997)
- Mosippan – Elsie Johansson (1998)
- Berömda män som varit i Sunne – Göran Tunström (1998)
- Syskonen – Magnus Florin (1998)
- Sena sagor – PC Jersild (1998)
- Parsifal – Sigrid Combüchen (1998)
- Väduren – Björn Runeborg (1999)
- Det hemliga namnet – Inger Edelfeldt (1999)
- Vargskinnet – Guds barmhärtighet – Kerstin Ekman (1999)
- The Visit of the Royal Physician – Per Olov Enquist (1999)
- Oskuldens minut – Sara Lidman (1999)
- Stämma i havet – Stewe Claeson (1999)

== Twenty-first century ==
=== 2000s ===
- Hässja – Åke Smedberg (2000)
- Jag smyger förbi en yxa – Beate Grimsrud (2000)
- Den älskvärde – Carola Hansson (2000)
- Tio syskon i en ömtålig berättelse – Kerstin Strandberg (2000)
- I den Röda Damens slott – Lars Jakobson (2000)
- Popular Music from Vittula – Mikael Niemi (2000)
- Lord Nevermore – Agneta Pleijel (2001)
- Vandrarna – Jan Henrik Swahn (2001)
- Min faders hus – Kerstin Norborg (2001)
- Pompeji – Maja Lundgren (2001)
- Lewis resa – Per Olov Enquist (2001)
- Underdog – Torbjörn Flygt (2001)
- The Horrific Sufferings of the Mind-Reading Monster Hercules Barefoot – Carl-Johan Vallgren (2002)
- Till Mervas – Elisabeth Rynell (2002)
- Min faders hus – Kerstin Norborg (2002)
- Berget – Lars Andersson (2002)
- Band II Från Gabbro till Löväng – Lotta Lotass (2002)
- Ciona – en självbiologi – Tamara T. (2002)
- Polarsommar – Anne Swärd (2003)
- Imago – Eva-Marie Liffner (2003)
- Ett öga rött – Jonas Hassen Khemiri (2003)
- Lottery Scratchcards – Kerstin Ekman (2003)
- En simtur i sundet – Sigrid Combüchen (2003)
- Ravensbrück – Steve Sem-Sandberg (2003)
- Pölsan – Torgny Lindgren (2003)
- Gregorius – Bengt Ohlsson (2004)
- Öde – Christine Falkenland (2004)
- En obeskrivlig människa – Kerstin Strandberg (2004)
- Tredje flykthastigheten – Lotta Lotass (2004)
- Boken om Blanche och Marie – Per Olov Enquist (2004)
- Berg – Bo Carpelan (2005)
- Simone de Beauvoirs hjärta – Ann-Marie Ljungberg (2005)
- Gangsters – Klas Östergren (2005)
- Job – Kristian Lundberg (2005)
- skymning:gryning – Lotta Lotass (2005)
- The American Girl – Monika Fagerholm (2005)
- I min ungdom speglade jag mig ofta – Per Gunnar Evander (2005)
- Förvandling – Eva Adolfsson (2006)
- Easy Money – Jens Lapidus (2006)
- Montecore: The Silence of the Tiger – Jonas Hassen Khemiri (2006)
- Göteborgshändelserna – Jörgen Gassilewski (2006)
- Där vi en gång gått – Kjell Westö (2006)
- Den amerikanska flickans söndagar – Lars Gustafsson (2006)
- Drömfakulteten – Sara Stridsberg (2006)
- Svinalängorna – Susanna Alakoski (2006)
- Mig äger ingen – Åsa Linderborg (2007)
- Har någon sett mig någon annanstans? – Beate Grimsrud (2007)
- Stundande natten – Carl-Henning Wijkmark (2007)
- Världens sista roman – Daniel Sjölin (2007)
- The Hurricane Party – Klas Östergren (2007)
- Norrlands Akvavit – Torgny Lindgren (2007)
- Synopsis – Ulf Karl Olov Nilsson (2007)
- Dag – Björn Runeborg (2008)
- Never Screw Up – Jens Lapidus (2008)
- Edelcrantz förbindelser – Malte Persson (2008)
- Reglerna – Sara Mannheimer (2008)
- Den siste greken – Aris Fioretos (2009)
- Sin ensamma kropp – Elsie Johansson (2009)
- En liten historia – Eva Adolfsson (2009)
- The Hundred-Year-Old Man Who Climbed Out the Window and Disappeared – Jonas Jonasson (2009)
- Den sista cigaretten – Klas Östergren (2009)
- Yarden – Kristian Lundberg (2009)
- Hotel Galicja – Per Agne Erkelius (2009)
- The Emperor of Lies – Steve Sem-Sandberg (2009)

=== 2010s ===
- Skulle jag dö under andra himlar – Johannes Anyuru (2010)
- Att föda ett barn – Kristina Sandberg (2010)
- Ränderna – Magnus Florin (2010)
- Kioskvridning 140 grader – En wästern – Peter Törnqvist (2010)
- Darling River – Sara Stridsberg (2010)
- Spill. En damroman – Sigrid Combüchen (2010)
- Bret Easton Ellis and the Other Dogs – Lina Wolff (2010)
- Välkommen till den här världen – Amanda Svensson (2011)
- En dåre fri – Beate Grimsrud (2011)
- Rekviem för John Cummings – Bengt Ohlsson (2011)
- Flod – Carolina Fredriksson (2011)
- Lacrimosa – Eva-Marie Liffner (2011)
- Life Deluxe – Jens Lapidus (2011)
- En kubikmeter jord – Sören Bondeson (2011)
- Korparna – Tomas Bannerhed (2011)
- Springa med åror – Cilla Naumann (2012)
- Ingenbarnsland – Eija Hetekivi Olsson (2012)
- A Brief Stop on the Road from Auschwitz – Göran Rosenberg (2012)
- En storm kom från paradiset – Johannes Anyuru (2012)
- Torka aldrig tårar utan handskar: Kärleken – Jonas Gardell (2012)
- Och allt skall vara kärlek – Kristian Lundberg (2012)
- Sörja för de sina – Kristina Sandberg (2012)
- Sång till den storm som ska komma – Peter Fröberg Idling (2012)
- Is – Ulla-Lena Lundberg (2012)
- Vinterträdet – Ellen Mattson (2012)
- Skuggland – Jonas Brun (2013)
- Torka aldrig tårar utan handskar: Döden – Jonas Gardell (2013)
- Torka aldrig tårar utan handskar: Sjukdomen – Jonas Gardell (2013)
- Mirage 38 – Kjell Westö (2013)
- Wilful Disregard – Lena Andersson (2013)
- Liknelseboken. En kärleksroman – Per Olov Enquist (2013)
- Porslinsfasaderna – Sven Olov Karlsson (2013)
- Alkemistens dotter – Carl-Michael Edenborg (2014)
- Twist – Klas Östergren (2014)
- Liv till varje pris – Kristina Sandberg (2014)
- Utan personligt ansvar – Lena Andersson (2014)
- Ett så starkt ljus – Lyra Ekström Lindbäck (2014)
- Beckomberga. Ode till min familj – Sara Stridsberg (2014)
- De utvalda – Steve Sem-Sandberg (2014)
- Kafkapaviljongen – Tony Samuelsson (2014)
- Allt jag inte minns – Jonas Hassen Khemiri (2015)
- Mary – Aris Fioretos (2015)
- The Polyglot Lovers – Lina Wolff (2016)
- Tornet och fåglarna – Ellen Mattson (2017)
- Den svavelgula himlen – Kjell Westö (2017)
- Vera – Anne Swärd (2017)
- Nelly B:s hjärta – Aris Fioretos (2018)
- Kärlekens antarktis – Sara Stridsberg (2019)

=== 2020s ===
- Renegater – Klas Östergren (2020)

== See also ==
- List of Swedish-language novels translated into English
