= List of novels set in Stockholm =

This article provides an incomplete list of novels set in Stockholm. Included is the date of first publication.

== Nineteenth century ==
=== 1830s ===
- Det går an – Carl Jonas Love Almqvist (1839)

=== 1870s ===
- The Red Room – August Strindberg (1879)

=== 1880s ===
- The Son of a Servant – August Strindberg (1886)

=== 1890s ===
- Förvillelser – Hjalmar Söderberg (1895)

== Twentieth century ==
=== 1900s ===
- Martin Birck's Youth – Hjalmar Söderberg (1901)
- Alone – August Strindberg (1903)
- Doctor Glas – Hjalmar Söderberg (1905)
- Norrtullsligan – Elin Wägner (1908)

=== 1910s ===
- The Serious Game – Hjalmar Söderberg (1912)
- The Emperor of Portugallia – Selma Lagerlöf (1914)

=== 1930s ===
- England Made Me – Graham Greene (1935)
- Kungsgatan – Ivar Lo-Johansson (1935)
- Sömnlös – Vilhelm Moberg (1937)

=== 1940s ===
- Grupp Krilon – Eyvind Johnson (1941)
- Krilons resa – Eyvind Johnson (1942)
- Krilon själv – Eyvind Johnson (1943)

=== 1960s ===
- City of My Dreams – Per Anders Fogelström (1960)
- Children of Their City – Per Anders Fogelström (1962)
- The Prize – Irving Wallace (1962)
- Remember the City – Per Anders Fogelström (1964)
- The Story of a Crime (novel series) – Maj Sjöwall and Per Wahlöö (1965–1975)
- In a City Transformed – Per Anders Fogelström (1966)
- Stad i världen – Per Anders Fogelström (1968)

=== 1970s ===
- Attila – Klas Östergren (1975)
- The Aesthetics of Resistance – Peter Weiss (1975)
- Jack – Ulf Lundell (1976)
- Fantomerna – Klas Östergren (1978)

=== 1980s ===
- Gentlemen – Klas Östergren (1980)
- Evil – Jan Guillou (1981)
- Fattiga riddare och stora svenskar – Klas Östergren (1983)

== Twenty-first century ==
=== 2000s ===
- Ett öga rött – Jonas Hassen Khemiri (2003)
- Gregorius – Bengt Ohlsson (2004)
- Millennium (novel series) – Stieg Larsson (2005–2007)
- Gangsters – Klas Östergren (2005)
- Easy Money – Jens Lapidus (2006)
- Never Screw Up – Jens Lapidus (2008)
- Den sista cigaretten – Klas Östergren (2009)

=== 2010s ===
- Life Deluxe – Jens Lapidus (2011)
- Torka aldrig tårar utan handskar: Kärleken – Jonas Gardell (2012)
- Wilful Disregard – Lena Andersson (2013)
- Torka aldrig tårar utan handskar: Sjukdomen – Jonas Gardell (2013)
- Torka aldrig tårar utan handskar: Döden – Jonas Gardell (2013)
- Utan personligt ansvar – Lena Andersson (2014)
- Twist – Klas Östergren (2014)
