= List of Norwegian films of 2014 =

The Norwegian film industry produced over fifty feature films in 2014. This article fully lists all non-pornographic films, including short films, that had a release date in that year and which were at least partly made by Norway. It does not include films first released in previous years that had release dates in 2014.

== Major releases ==
Opening		Title	Cast and crew	Studio	Genre(s)	Ref.
J A N U A R Y	10	Kule kidz gråter ikke	Director: Katarina Launing; Cast: Mia Helene Solberg Brekke, Victor Papadopoulos Jacobsen, Jeppe Beck Laursen	SF Norge	Drama	
J A N U A R Y	19	Blind	Director: Eskil Vogt	Cinéart	Drama	
J A N U A R Y	19	Dead Snow: Red vs. Dead	Director: Tommy Wirkola; Cast: Vegar Hoel, Orjan Gamst, Martin Starr, Ingrid Haas, Jocelyn DeBoer, Stig Frode Henriksen, Kristoffer Joner	Well Go USA Entertainment (US)	Horror; Comedy	
J A N U A R Y	20	The Sleepwalker	Director: Mona Fastvold; Cast: Gitte Witt, Christopher Abbott, Stephanie Ellis, Brady Corbet	Nordisk Filmdistribusjon	Drama	
F E B R U A R Y	10	In Order of Disappearance	Director: Hans Petter Moland; Cast: Stellan Skarsgård		Action; Comedy	
M A Y	18	Force Majeure	Director: Ruben Östlund; Cast: Johannes Bah Kuhnke, Lisa Loven Kongsli, Clara Wettergre, Vincent Wettergren, Kristofer Hivju, Fanni Metelius	TriArt Film	Drama	
M A Y	30	The System	Director: Shahzad Ghufoor; Cast: Sheraz, Kashaf Ali	Prime Film International	Action; Drama	
S E P T E M B E R	2	A Pigeon Sat on a Branch Reflecting on Existence	Director: Roy Andersson; Cast: Nisse Vestblom, Holger Andersson	Roy Andersson Filmproduktion AB	Comedy; Drama	
S E P T E M B E R	4	Frailer	Director: Mijke de Jong; Cast: Marnie Blok		Drama	
S E P T E M B E R	5	Dukhtar	Director: Afia Nathaniel; Cast: Samiya Mumtaz, Mohib Mirza, Saleha Aref, Asif Khan, Ajab Gul, Samina Ahmad	Geo Films	Drama; Thriller	
S E P T E M B E R	5	Murder in Pacot	Director: Raoul Peck; Cast: Joy Olasunmibo Ogunmakin, Alex Descas, Thibault Vinçon, Lovely Kermonde Fifi, Zinedine Soualem	Doc&Film International	Drama	
S E P T E M B E R	6	Out of Nature	Director: Ole Giæver; Cast: Ole Giæver		Comedy	
S E P T E M B E R	7	1001 Grams	Director: Bent Hamer; Cast: Ane Dahl Torp, Stein Winge, Per Christian Ellefsen		Drama	
S E P T E M B E R	7	Meet Me in Montenegro	Director: Alex Holdridge, Linnea Saasen; Cast: Rupert Friend, Linnea Saasen, Jennifer Ulrich, Alex Holdridge	The Orchard	Romance; Comedy	
S E P T E M B E R	7	Miss Julie	Director: Liv Ullmann; Cast: Jessica Chastain, Colin Farrell, Samantha Morton	Columbia TriStar	Drama	
S E P T E M B E R	30	Violent	Director: Andrew Huculiak; Cast: Dagny Backer Johnsen, Mari Sofie Andreassen, Karl Bird, Tomine Mikkeline Eide, Tor Halvor Halvorsen, Yngve Seterås	Media Darling	Drama	
O C T O B E R	10	The Veil of Twilight	Director: Paul Magnus Lundø; Cast: Leif Nygaard, Ewen Bremner, Kim Bodnia, Andreas Wilson, Jørgen Langhelle, Kristina Knaben Hennestad, Nils Utsi		Crime; Mystery; Thriller	
D E C E M B E R	5	Gentlemen	Director: Mikael Marcimain; Cast: David Dencik, Ruth Vega Fernandez, Sverrir Gudnason, David Fukamachi Regnfors	AB Svensk Filmindustri	Drama; Romance; Thriller	

== See also ==
- 2014 in film
- 2014 in Norway
- Cinema of Norway
- List of Norwegian submissions for the Academy Award for Best Foreign Language Film
