= Mikael Marcimain =

Swedish film and television director (born 1970)

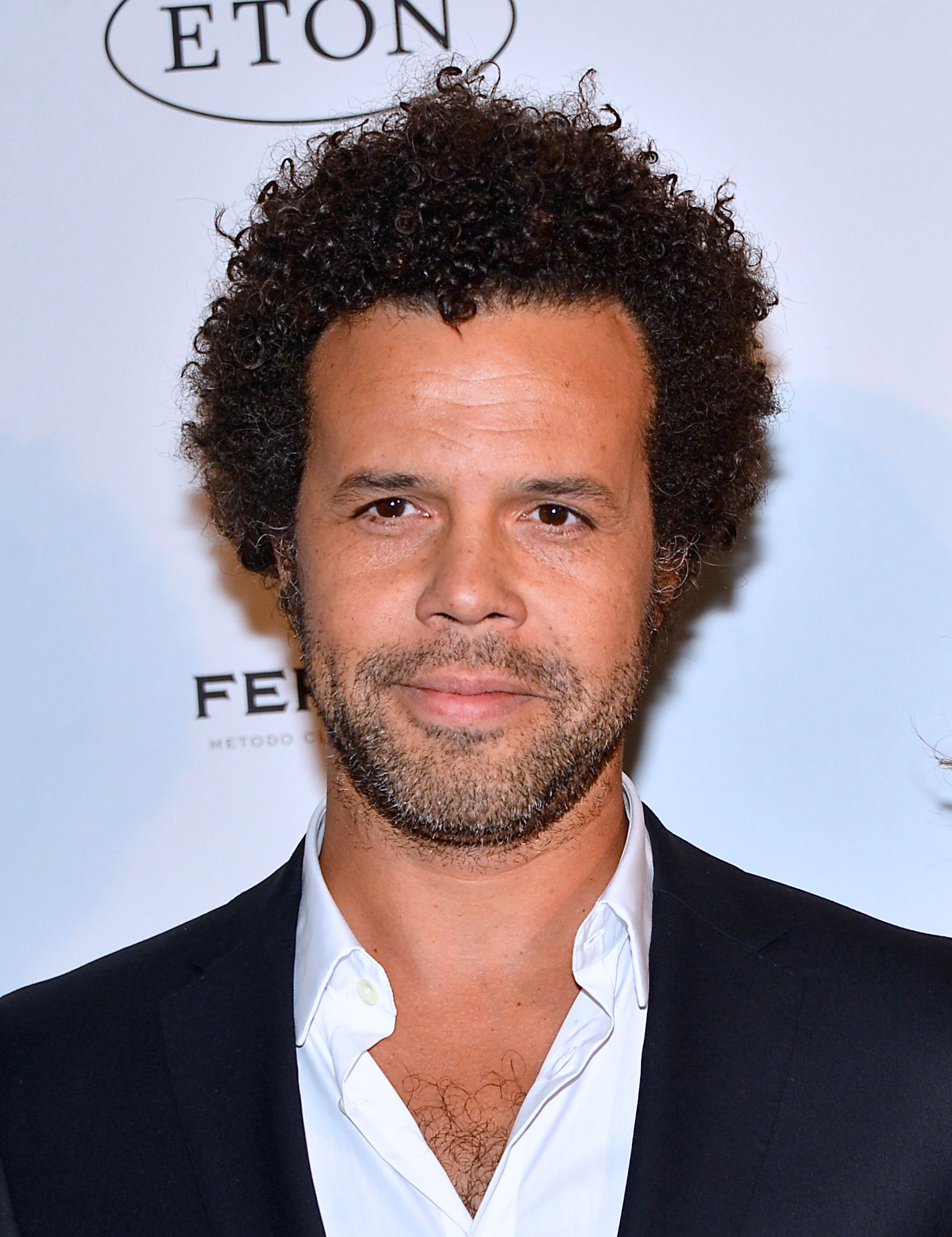
- Born: 17 March 1970 (age 55); Stockholm, Sweden
- Occupation: Film director
- Years active: 1999–present

Mikael Marcimain (born 17 March 1970) is a Swedish film and television director. Marcimain has primarily directed advertisements and television dramas, for which he has received several awards. Notable in his filmography are the serials The Laser Man and How Soon Is Now?, which were made with cinematographer Hoyte van Hoytema. Marcimain's first feature film, the political thriller Call Girl, was released in autumn 2012.

== Career ==
Marcimain worked for nine years as an assistant director in the film industry before he was offered to make the one-hour film Broken Hearts as part of SVT Drama's TV series A Little Red Package (1999). His breakthrough came with the acclaimed miniseries Lasermannen (2005) and How Soon Is Now? (2007). He was awarded the Dagens Nyheter Culture Prize in 2007.

In June 2011, he received funding from the Swedish Film Institute to record his first feature film Call Girl, inspired by the so-called Geijer affair in the 1970s. The script was written by Marietta von Hausswolff von Baumgarten. For Call Girl, Marcimain won the international critics' organization FIPRESCI's debut award at the Toronto Film Festival 2012 and was nominated for nine Guldbagge Awards, of which it won three. Marcimain was nominated in the category Best Director. A scene in the film received a lot of attention in the media when relatives of former Swedish prime minister Olof Palme said that it portrayed him as a sex buyer of minors. Marcimain himself said that it was pure fiction, a feature film, and emphasized that he saw the film as a "women's film" that shows how power, the patriarchy, exploits the girls.

In 2013, Marcimain started the filming of the film adaptation of Klas Östergren's novels Gentlemen and Gangsters, in which David Dencik plays the lead role as the dandy Henry Morgan. This will be the third time Marcimain and Dencik have worked together.

Marcimain has stated that one of his future projects will be to film Stefan Spjut's novel Stallo, which takes place in the realm of fairy tales and is about trolls.

He often works with actors Ruth Vega Fernandez, David Dencik, Simon J. Berger and Sverrir Gudnason and has cited Bo Widerberg as a great role model in his filmmaking.

He directed An Honest Life (2025), a Netflix original thriller film based on Joakim Zander's novel of the same name.

== Filmography ==
Year	English title	Original title	Notes
1999	Ett litet rött paket		TV film
2002	Skeppsholmen		TV series
2003	Det brinner!		TV serial
2004	Graven		TV serial
2005	The Laser Man	Lasermannen	TV serial
2007	How Soon Is Now?	Upp till kamp	TV serial
2010	Wallander		Two episodes
2012	Call Girl		
2014	Gentlemen		
2018	Liberty		
2020	Horizon Line		
2023	Blackwater		TV series
2025	An Honest Life	Ett ärligt liv	Film
