= Gentlemen (2014 film) =

2014 film

- Swedish theatrical release poster
- Directed by: Mikael Marcimain
- Screenplay by: Klas Östergren; Mikael Marcimain
- Based on: Gentlemen by Klas Östergren
- Produced by: Fredrik Heinig; Johannes Åhlund; Mattias Nohrborg
- Starring: David Dencik; Sverrir Gudnason; David Fukamachi Regnfors; Ruth Vega Fernandez; Pernilla August; Boman Oscarsson; Magnus Krepper; Sven Nordin
- Cinematography: Jallo Faber
- Edited by: Kristofer Nordin
- Music by: Mattias Bärjed
- Production company: B-Reel Films
- Distributed by: Svensk Filmindustri
- Release dates: 6 September 2014 (TIFF); 5 December 2014 (Sweden); 23 January 2015 (Norway)
- Running time: 141 minutes
- Countries: Sweden; Norway
- Language: Swedish

Gentlemen is a 2014 romantic thriller film directed by Mikael Marcimain, based on the novel of the same name by Klas Östergren. The film was nominated for the 2015 Nordic Council Film Prize.

== Cast ==
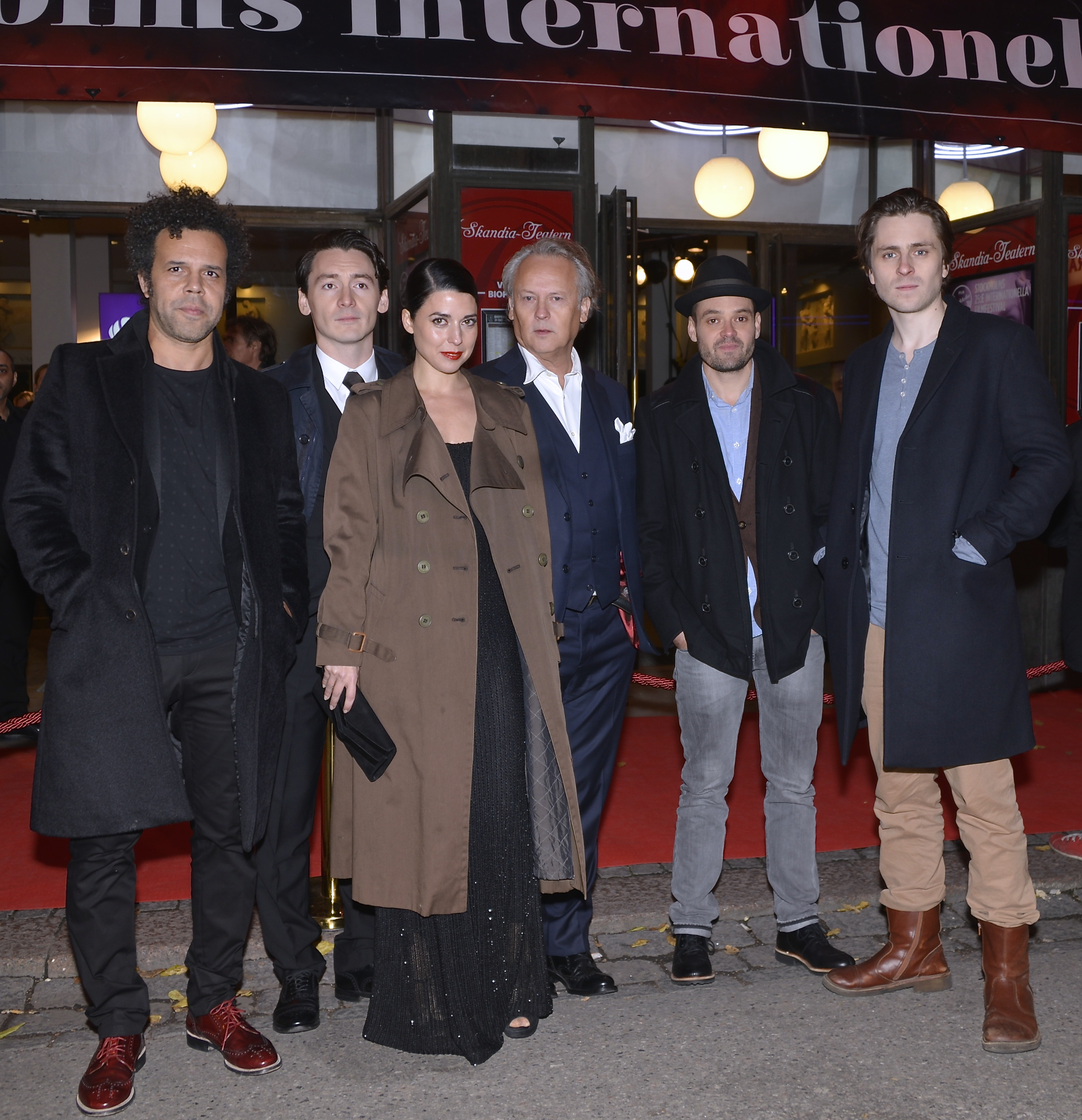
Gentlemen production and cast at the 2014 Stockholm International Film Festival. From left: Mikael Marcimain, David Fukamachi Regnfors, Ruth Vega Fernandez, Klas Östergren, David Dencik, Sverrir Gudnason

- David Dencik as Henry Morgan
- Ruth Vega Fernandez as Maud
- Sverrir Gudnason as Leo Morgan
- David Fukamachi Regnfors as Klas Östergren
- Pernilla August as Greta
- Peter Carlberg as Birger
- Magnus Krepper as Stene Forman
- Magnus Roosmann as Jazzbaronen
- Sven Nordin as Franzén
- Boman Oscarsson as Wilhelm Sterner
- Amanda Ooms as Hälardrottningen
- Staffan Göthe as Hogarth
- Sonja Richter as Tove
- Liv Mjönes as Vivi
- Louise Peterhoff as Nina
- Anders Beckman as Knegarn
- Per Myrberg as Sailorn
- Lars Green as Willis
- Björn Andersson as Conny
- Dag Malmberg as Cigarrhandlare
- Christopher Wagelin as Verner
- Jennie Silfverhjelm as Kerstin
- Per Burell as Jansen
- Frida Röhl as Titti på isen
- Lil Terselius as Maud's mother

== Production ==
Gentlemen was shot in Stockholm, Scania, Vilnius, Paris and Jutland.
