= Call Girl (2012 film) =

2012 Swedish drama film directed by Mikael Marcimain

- Theatrical release poster
- Directed by: Mikael Marcimain
- Written by: Marietta von Hausswolff von Baumgarten
- Produced by: Mimmi Spång
- Starring: Sofia Karemyr; Pernilla August; Simon J. Berger; Josefin Asplund; David Dencik; Sven Ahlström; Ruth Vega Fernandez; Magnus Krepper; Hanna Ullerstam; Anders Beckman; Kristoffer Joner; Sverrir Gudnason
- Cinematography: Hoyte van Hoytema
- Edited by: Kristofer Nordin
- Music by: Mattias Bärjed
- Production companies: Garagefilm International; Friland Produksjon; Newgrange Pictures; Yellow Film & TV; Film i Väst; Sveriges Television; Nouvago Capital; The Chimney Pot; Dagsljus
- Distributed by: Nordisk Film (Sweden and Finland); Fidalgo (Norway); Curzon Film World (Ireland)
- Release dates: 7 September 2012 (Stockholm); 9 November 2012 (Sweden); 23 November 2012 (Finland); 21 June 2013 (Norway); 16 August 2013 (Ireland)
- Running time: 140 minutes
- Countries: Sweden; Finland; Norway; Ireland
- Language: Swedish
- Box office: $1.9 million

Call Girl is a 2012 political thriller film directed by Mikael Marcimain and written by Marietta von Hausswolff von Baumgarten. It stars Sofia Karemyr, Simon J. Berger and Josefin Asplund. The story is a fictionalised version of events based on the so-called Bordellhärvan political scandal of 1970s Sweden which linked several prominent politicians to a prostitution ring that included underage girls.

== Plot ==
Set against the backdrop of the 1976 election, the story is centered on delinquent teenager Iris, who is sent to live in a juvenile home. She meets Sonja there and the two regularly slip away for adventures in the city. Together they are recruited into a prostitution ring operated by Dagmar Glans, a madam well known to the authorities. Dagmar's clients are mostly rich and powerful men, including senior politicians of the day. She becomes the subject of a police investigation led by a young vice officer, John Sandberg. Sandberg soon discovers Glans has powerful clients but also finds his investigation hampered by his superiors and his life threatened by sinister figures. Police break up the prostitution ring but the powerful clients avoid being named in the scandal and Dagmar's trial concludes with her receiving a suspended sentence before Iris can testify about being an underage prostitute. In the aftermath of the trial, Sandberg is killed in a hit and run incident and his report into the affair is classified by the newly elected government. The film ends with Iris running away from the juvenile home, her ultimate fate ambiguous.

== Cast ==
- Sofia Karemyr as Iris
- Simon J. Berger as John
- Josefin Asplund as Sonja
- Pernilla August as Dagmar Glans
- Anders Beckman as Roy
- Sven Nordin as Glenn
- David Dencik as Aspen
- Hanna Ullerstam as Mona
- Sverrir Gudnason as Krister
- Maria Alm Norell as Gunnel, Iris's mother
- Lena B. Eriksson as Britt, social worker
- Jade Viljamaa as Minna
- Julia Lindblom as Mari
- Eddie Hultén as David
- Tobias Ekelund as Tompa, scooter guy
- Max Nilén as Svante, scooter guy
- Sven Ahlström as Stig Hall, TV host
- Andreas Kundler as Bootjack
- Ruth Vega Fernandez as Sasja, call girl
- Jennie Silverhjelm as Sylvia, call girl
- Emelie Jonsson as Maritza, call girl
- Frida Röhl as Gita, call girl
- Louise Peterhoff as Ulla, call girl
- Outi Mäenpää as Sirja, call girl
- Natacha Mutomb Dackén as Marinelle, call girl
- Magnus Krepper as Prime Minister
- Claes Ljungmark as Minister of Justice
- Dag Malmberg as Leader of The Opposition
- Mats Blomgren as The Social Worker
- Anna Bjelkerud as Office of The Secretary
- Kristoffer Joner as Sören Laurell-Wall
- Björn Andersson as Chief Prosecutor Rundgren
- Peter Carlberg as Deputy Prosecutor Wahl
- Rasmus Troedsson as Sörensson, attorney
- Lars Green as Kurt Nygren, head reconnaissance
- Klas Östergren as Sten Jenkert, Security Police Manager/east
- Boman Oscarsson as Nils Holm, Security Police Manager/administrator
- Jakob Fahlstedt as Security Police Scouts/east
- Magnus Carlson as Security Police Scouts/east
- David Fukamachi Regnfors as Dagmar's Son

== Reception ==
On review aggregator website Rotten Tomatoes, the film holds an 80% rank based on 15 reviews, with an average rating of 7.1/10.

=== Accolades ===
It received the FIPRESCI Discovery prize at the 2012 Toronto International Film Festival. The film opened the Stockholm International Film Festival in November 2012. It went on to win the Silver Audience Award, which is voted for by the audience during the festival.

It was later nominated in 11 categories at the 48th Guldbagge Awards, including Best Film, Best Director and Best Screenplay, and won in four.

Award	Date of ceremony	Category	Recipients and nominees	Result
Guldbagge Award	January 21, 2013	Best Film	Mimmi Spång (Producer)	Nominated
Guldbagge Award	January 21, 2013	Best Director	Mikael Marcimain	Nominated
Guldbagge Award	January 21, 2013	Best Actress	Pernilla August	Nominated
Guldbagge Award	January 21, 2013	Best Screenplay	Marietta von Hausswolff von Baumgarten	Nominated
Guldbagge Award	January 21, 2013	Best Cinematography	Hoyte van Hoytema	Won
Guldbagge Award	January 21, 2013	Best Film Editing	Kristofer Nordin	Nominated
Guldbagge Award	January 21, 2013	Best Sound Editing	Petter Fladeby and Per Nyström	Won
Guldbagge Award	January 21, 2013	Best Costume Design	Cilla Rörby	Won
Guldbagge Award	January 21, 2013	Best Make-up and Hair	Eros Codinas	Nominated
Guldbagge Award	January 21, 2013	Best Art Direction	Lina Nordqvist	Won
Guldbagge Award	January 21, 2013	Best Visual Effects	Tim Morris	Nominated
