= Sofia Karemyr =

Swedish actress

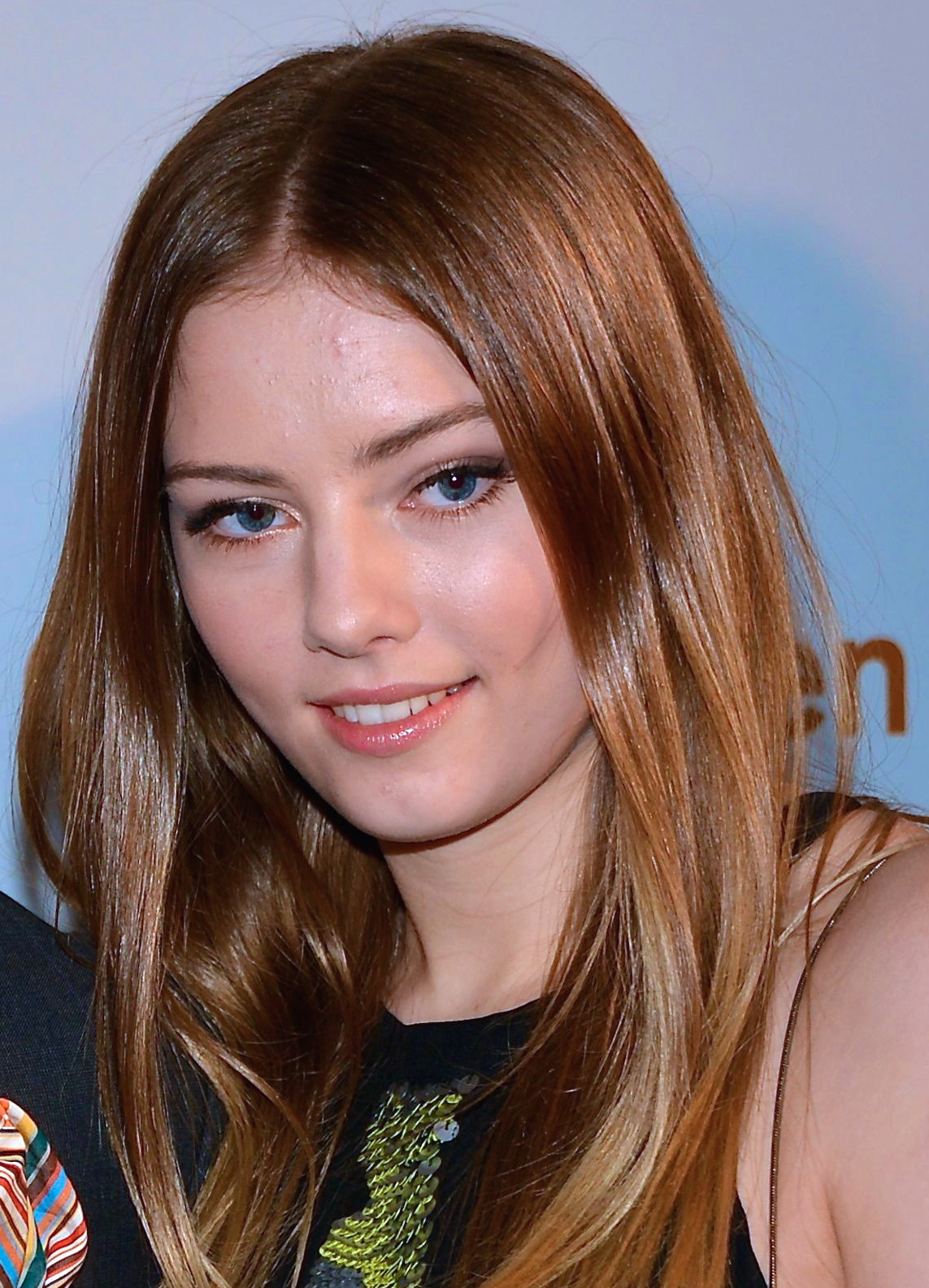
- Karemyr in 2013
- Born: Emmy Sofia Oline Karemyr; 1 February 1994 (age 32)
- Occupation: Actress
- Years active: 2007–present

Emmy Sofia Oline Karemyr (born 1 February 1994) is a Swedish actress. She is best known for her roles in the films Call Girl and Becoming Astrid, and the Viaplay series Älska mig and Partisan.

== Early and personal life ==
Karemyr is from Stockholm. She attended Östra Real in Östermalm for high school and took acting classes at Calle Flygare Teaterskola in Norrmalm.

As of 2020, Karemyr is based in Södermalm with her boyfriend Martin Rehnström.

== Filmography ==
=== Film ===
Year	Title	Role	Notes
2012	Call Girl	Iris	
2018	Becoming Astrid (Swedish: Unga Astrid)	Madicken	
2020	Desire	Sloan	Short film

=== Television ===
Year	Title	Role	Notes
2007	The Inspector and the Sea (Swedish: Der Kommissar und das Meer)	Julia Karlström	1 episode
2019–2020	Love Me (Swedish: Älska mig)	Jenny	Main role
2020-2022	Partisan	Nicole	5 episodes
2022	The Playlist	Steffi	4 episodes
