= Hoyte van Hoytema =

Dutch cinematographer (born 1971)

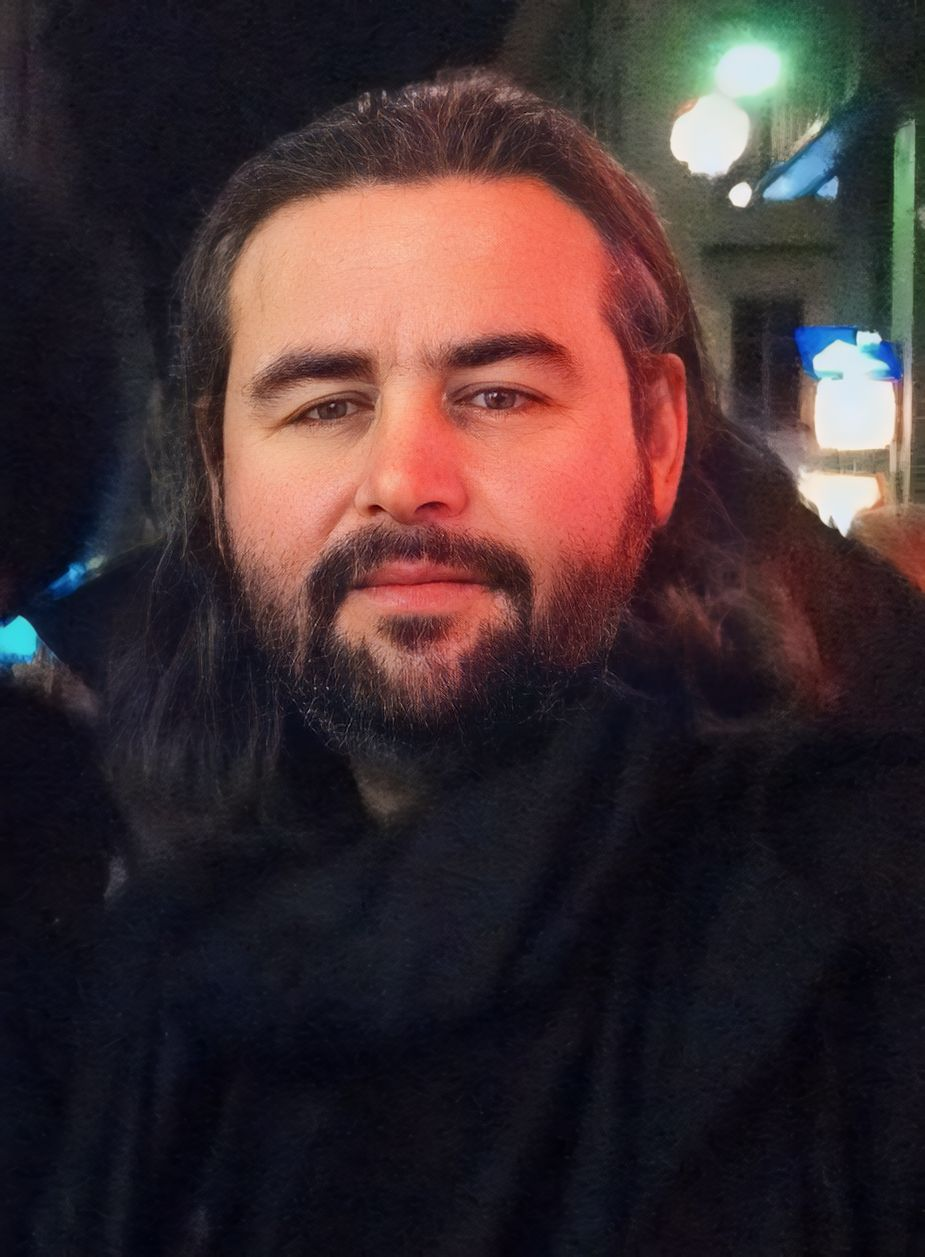
- Van Hoytema in November 2012
- Born: 4 October 1971 (age 54); Horgen, Switzerland
- Education: Łódź Film School
- Occupation: Cinematographer
- Years active: 1997–present

Hoyte van Hoytema ASC (Dutch: [ˈɦɔitə vɑn ˈɦɔitəmaː]; born 4 October 1971) is a Dutch-Swiss cinematographer, known for his collaboration with director Christopher Nolan.

Renowned for his handheld camera work and for shooting primarily on film, he has received two nominations for the Academy Award for Best Cinematography, winning one for Oppenheimer (2023).

== Early life ==
Van Hoytema was born in Horgen, Switzerland, on October 4, 1971, the son of Dutch parents. The family returned to the Netherlands shortly after his birth.

He moved to Poland to study at Łódź Film School.

== Career ==
Van Hoytema's work as a cinematographer includes Let the Right One In (2008), The Fighter (2010), Tinker Tailor Soldier Spy (2011), Her (2013), the James Bond film Spectre (2015), Ad Astra (2019), and Nope (2022). His collaborations with directors Mikael Marcimain, Tomas Alfredson, and Christopher Nolan have earned him critical acclaim.

Van Hoytema's work has earned him multiple awards, including an Academy Award from two nominations and a BAFTA Award from four nominations for Best Cinematography.

He is a member of the American Society of Cinematographers, the Swedish Society of Cinematographers, and the Netherlands Society of Cinematographers.

== Filmography ==
Key
†	Denotes films that have not yet been released

=== Film ===
Year	Title	Director	Notes
2003	Svidd neger	Erik Smith Meyer	
2004	Chlorox, Ammonium and Coffee	Mona J. Hoel	
2005	Pistvakt	Stephan Apelgren	
2008	Let the Right One In	Tomas Alfredson	
2009	The Girl	Fredrik Edfeldt	
2010	Ond tro	Kristian Petri	
2010	The Fighter	David O. Russell	
2011	Tinker Tailor Soldier Spy	Tomas Alfredson	
2012	Call Girl	Mikael Marcimain	
2013	Her	Spike Jonze	
2014	Interstellar	Christopher Nolan	1st collaboration with Nolan
2015	Spectre	Sam Mendes	
2017	Dunkirk	Christopher Nolan	
2019	Ad Astra	James Gray	
2020	Tenet	Christopher Nolan	
2022	Nope	Jordan Peele	
2023	Oppenheimer	Christopher Nolan	Winner - Academy Award for Best Cinematography at the 96th Academy Awards
2026	The Odyssey	Christopher Nolan	

=== Television ===
Miniseries

Year	Title	Director
2002	Den förste zigenaren i rymden	Agneta Fagerström-Olsson
2004	Danslärarens återkomst	Stephan Apelgren
2005	The Laser Man	Mikael Marcimain
2006	En fråga om liv och död	Håkan Lindhé
2007	How Soon Is Now?	Mikael Marcimain

== Awards and nominations ==
Academy Awards

Year	Title	Category	Result	Ref.
2017	Dunkirk	Best Cinematography	Nominated	
2023	Oppenheimer	Best Cinematography	Won	

BAFTA Awards

Year	Title	Category	Result	Ref.
2011	Tinker Tailor Soldier Spy	Best Cinematography	Nominated	
2014	Interstellar	Best Cinematography	Nominated	
2017	Dunkirk	Best Cinematography	Nominated	
2023	Oppenheimer	Best Cinematography	Won	

American Society of Cinematographers

Year	Title	Category	Result	Ref.
2011	Tinker Tailor Soldier Spy	Outstanding Cinematography	Nominated	
2017	Dunkirk	Outstanding Cinematography	Nominated	
2023	Oppenheimer	Outstanding Cinematography	Won	

Other awards

Year	Title	Award	Result	Ref.
2008	Let the Right One In	Guldbagge Award for Best Cinematography	Won	
2008	Let the Right One In	Kodak Nordic Vision Award for Best Cinematography	Won	
2009	Flickan (The Girl)	Guldbagge Award for Best Cinematography	Won	
2012	Call Girl	Guldbagge Award for Best Cinematography	Won	
2013	Her	Chicago Film Critics Association Award for Best Cinematography	Nominated	
2013	Her	Washington D.C. Area Film Critics Association Award for Best Cinematography	Nominated	
2013	Her	Awards Circuit Community Awards for Best Cinematography	Nominated	
2013	Her	Central Ohio Film Critics Association for Best Cinematography	Nominated	
2013	Her	Indiewire Critics' Poll for Best Cinematography	Nominated	
2013	Her	International Online Cinema Awards for Best Cinematography	Nominated	
2013	Her	Italian Online Movie Awards for Best Cinematography	Nominated	
2013	Her	Online Film & Television Association for Best Cinematography	Nominated	
2013	Her	San Francisco Film Critics Circle for Best Cinematography	Nominated	
2013	Her	Cinema Bloggers Awards for Best Cinematography	Nominated	
2013	Her	Críticos de Cinema Online Portugueses Awards for Best Cinematography	Nominated	
2013	Her	Gold Derby Awards for Best Cinematography	Nominated	
2014	Interstellar	Florida Film Critics Circle Awards for Best Cinematography	Won	
2014	Interstellar	Nevada Film Critics Society for Best Cinematography	Won	
2014	Interstellar	North Texas Film Critics Association for Best Cinematography	Won	
2014	Interstellar	Chicago Film Critics Association Award for Best Cinematography	Nominated	
2014	Interstellar	Critics' Choice Movie Award for Best Cinematography	Nominated	
2014	Interstellar	San Diego Film Critics Society Award for Best Cinematography	Nominated	
2014	Interstellar	Satellite Award for Best Cinematography	Nominated	
2014	Interstellar	Washington D.C. Area Film Critics Association Award for Best Cinematography	Nominated	
2014	Interstellar	Alliance of Women Film Journalists for Best Cinematography	Nominated	
2014	Interstellar	Awards Circuit Community Awards for Best Cinematography	Nominated	
2014	Interstellar	Broadcast Film Critics Association Awards for Best Cinematography	Nominated	
2014	Interstellar	Central Ohio Film Critics Association for Best Cinematography	Nominated	
2014	Interstellar	Cinema Bloggers Awards for Best Cinematography	Nominated	
2014	Interstellar	Dallas-Fort Worth Film Critics Association Awards for Best Cinematography	Nominated	
2014	Interstellar	Denver Film Critics Society for Best Cinematography	Nominated	
2014	Interstellar	Georgia Film Critics Association for Best Cinematography	Nominated	
2014	Interstellar	Gold Derby Awards for Best Cinematography	Nominated	
2014	Interstellar	Houston Film Critics Society Awards for Best Cinematography	Nominated	
2014	Interstellar	Indiewire Critics' Poll for Best Cinematography	Nominated	
2014	Interstellar	Phoenix Film Critics Society Awards for Best Cinematography	Nominated	
2014	Interstellar	Seattle Film Critics Awards for Best Cinematography	Nominated	
2014	Interstellar	St. Louis Film Critics Association for Best Cinematography	Nominated	
2014	Interstellar	Visual Effects Society Awards for Outstanding Virtual Cinematography	Nominated	
2015	Spectre	Satellite Award for Best Cinematography	Nominated	
2017	Dunkirk	Boston Society of Film Critics Award for Best Cinematography	Won	
2017	Dunkirk	Southeastern Film Critics Association Awards for Best Cinematography	Won	
2017	Dunkirk	Georgia Film Critics Association for Best Cinematography	Won	
2017	Dunkirk	Atlanta Film Critics Circle for Best Cinematography	Won	
2017	Dunkirk	San Diego Film Critics Society Award for Best Cinematography	Won	
2017	Dunkirk	Chicago Film Critics Association Award for Best Cinematography	Nominated	
2017	Dunkirk	Critics' Choice Movie Award for Best Cinematography	Nominated	
2017	Dunkirk	Online Film Critics Society Award for Best Cinematography	Nominated	
2017	Dunkirk	Satellite Award for Best Cinematography	Nominated	
2017	Dunkirk	Washington D.C. Area Film Critics Association Award for Best Cinematography	Nominated	
2017	Dunkirk	Alliance of Women Film Journalists for Best Cinematography	Nominated	
2017	Dunkirk	Austin Film Critics Association for Best Cinematography	Nominated	
2017	Dunkirk	Awards Circuit Community Awards for Best Cinematography	Nominated	
2017	Dunkirk	Broadcast Film Critics Association Awards for Best Cinematography	Nominated	
2017	Dunkirk	Central Ohio Film Critics Association for Best Cinematography	Nominated	
2017	Dunkirk	Chicago Indie Critics Awards for Best Cinematography	Nominated	
2017	Dunkirk	Florida Film Critics Circle Awards for Best Cinematography	Nominated	
2017	Dunkirk	Gold Derby Awards for Best Cinematography	Nominated	
2017	Dunkirk	Hawaii Film Critics Society for Best Cinematography	Nominated	
2017	Dunkirk	Houston Film Critics Society Awards for Best Cinematography	Nominated	
2017	Dunkirk	Indiewire Critics' Poll for Best Cinematography	Nominated	
2017	Dunkirk	Los Angeles Online Film Critics Society Awards for Best Cinematography	Nominated	
2017	Dunkirk	National Society of Film Critics Awards for Best Cinematography	Nominated	
2017	Dunkirk	North Carolina Film Critics Association for Best Cinematography	Nominated	
2017	Dunkirk	North Texas Film Critics Association for Best Cinematography	Nominated	
2017	Dunkirk	Online Film & Television Association for Best Cinematography	Nominated	
2017	Dunkirk	Online Film Critics Society Awards for Best Cinematography	Nominated	
2017	Dunkirk	Phoenix Film Critics Society Awards for Best Cinematography	Nominated	
2017	Dunkirk	San Francisco Film Critics Circle for Best Cinematography	Nominated	
2017	Dunkirk	Seattle Film Critics Awards for Best Cinematography	Nominated	
2017	Dunkirk	St. Louis Film Critics Association for Best Cinematography	Nominated	
2017	Dunkirk	Utah Film Critics Association Awards for Best Cinematography	Nominated	
2020	Tenet	Black Film Critics Circle for Best Cinematography	Won	
2020	Tenet	Hawaii Film Critics Society for Best Cinematography	Won	
2020	Tenet	Austin Film Critics Association for Best Cinematography	Nominated	
2020	Tenet	Black Reel Awards for Best Cinematography	Nominated	
2020	Tenet	Critics' Choice Movie Awards for Best Cinematography	Nominated	
2020	Tenet	Chicago Indie Critics Awards for Best Cinematography	Nominated	
2020	Tenet	Columbus Film Critics Awards for Best Cinematography	Nominated	
2020	Tenet	Discussing Film Critics Awards for Best Cinematography	Nominated	
2020	Tenet	Florida Film Critics Circle for Best Cinematography	Nominated	
2020	Tenet	Georgia Film Critics Association for Best Cinematography	Nominated	
2020	Tenet	Hollywood Critics Association for Best Cinematography	Nominated	
2020	Tenet	Houston Film Critics Society for Best Cinematography	Nominated	
2020	Tenet	Gold Derby for Best Cinematography	Nominated	
2020	Tenet	Satellite Award for Best Cinematography	Nominated	
2020	Tenet	Online Film Critics Society Award for Best Cinematography	Nominated	
2023	Oppenheimer	Austin Film Critics Association for Best Cinematography	Won	
2023	Oppenheimer	Critics' Choice Movie Awards for Best Cinematography	Won	
2023	Oppenheimer	Georgia Film Critics Association for Best Cinematography	Won	
2023	Oppenheimer	Florida Film Critics Circle Awards for Best Cinematography	Nominated	
2023	Oppenheimer	National Society of Film Critics Awards for Best Cinematography	Nominated	
2023	Oppenheimer	San Diego Film Critics Society Award for Best Cinematography	Nominated	
