= Cannabis (TV series) =

2016 French-language television series

- Genre: Crime drama thriller
- Created by: Hamid Hlioua
- Starring: Kate Moran; Christophe Paou; Yasin Houicha
- Country of origin: France
- Original language: French
- No. of seasons: 1
- No. of episodes: 6

Production
- Running time: 60 min.

Original release
- Network: Arte
- Release: December 8, 2016

Cannabis is a six-part 2016 French-language TV series created by Hamid Hlioua and starring Kate Moran, Christophe Paou and Yasin Houicha. The plot revolves around how on a boat in the middle of the Mediterranean halfway between Spain and Africa, two tons of marijuana are stolen and a man goes missing and the people it involves in the aftermath.

It was released on December 8, 2016 on Arte.

The series was a Netflix Original title in many regions however departed in June 2020.

== Cast ==
- Kate Moran as Anna
- Christophe Paou as Morphée
- Yasin Houicha as Shams
- Jean-Michel Correia as Yassine
- Pedro Casablanc as El Feo
- Saïd El Mouden as Saïd
- Ruth Vega Fernandez as Nadja
- Radivoje Bukvic as Mirko
- Farida Rahouadj as Djemila
- Carima Amarouche as Zohra Kateb
- Isaac Kalvanda as Big Ben
- Younes Bouab as Farid
- Pep Tosar as Papi
- Santi Pons as Comandante
- Mar Sodupe as Inès Torres
- Nanou Harry as Amie de Djemila
- Yuri D. Brown as Trafiquant Hollandais
- Assaad Bouab as Jalil Djebli
- Julius Cotter as Trafiquant Anglais
