= Amanda Ooms =

Dutch-Swedish actress and writer (born 1964)

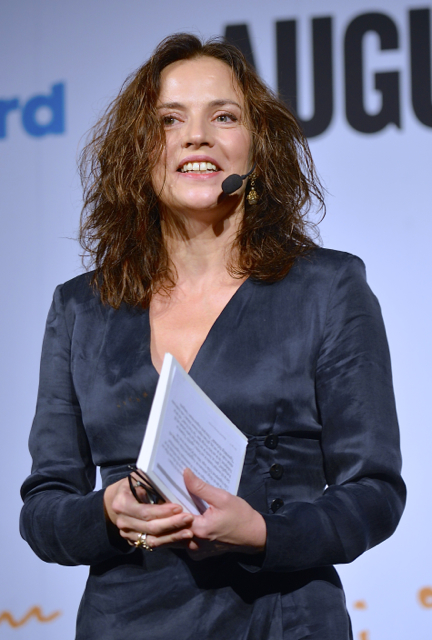
- Ooms at the August Prize awards in October 2014
- Born: Amanda Francisca Ooms; 5 September 1964 (age 61); Kalmar, Sweden
- Occupations: Actress; writer; artist
- Years active: 1986–present
- Partner(s): Jan Henrik Engström; Joakim Thåström
- Children: 2 (with Engström)

Amanda Francisca Ooms (born 5 September 1964) is a Dutch-Swedish actress and author. She has acted in both film and TV in Sweden and internationally. She was born in Kalmar. Ooms participates in season 10 of Stjärnorna på slottet which was broadcast on SVT.

== Filmography ==
- 1986 – Bröderna Mozart
- 1988 – Hotel St. Pauli
- 1989 – Kvinnorna på taket
- 1989 – Karachi
- 1991 – Buster's Bedroom
- 1992 – Ginevra
- 1992 – Young Indiana Jones
- 1993 – Vals Licht
- 1993 – De tussentijd
- 1995 – No Man's Land
- 1994 – Mesmer
- 1996 – Passageraren
- 1996 – Vargkvinnan
- 1996 – Wilderness
- 1997 – Jachd nach CM24
- 1997 – Chock i nöd och lust
- 1998 – Mellan Hopp och Förtvivlan
- 1998 – Getting Hurt
- 1999 – Doomwatch-Winterangel
- 1999 – Röd Jul
- 1999 – Recycled
- 2001 – Så vit som en snö
- 2002 – The Forsyte Saga
- 2003 – Fear X
- 2005 – Harrys döttrar
- 2005 – Wallander - Byfånen
- 2005 – Lasermannen
- 2006 – Sök
- 2006 – Linerboard
- 2007 – Upp till kamp
- 2007 – Isprinsessan
- 2008 – Everlasting Moments
- 2009 – Morden
- 2010 – Kommissarie Winter
- 2010 – Himlen är oskyldigt blå
- 2012 – The Expendables 2
- 2013 – Disciple
- 2014 – Accused

== Books ==
- Nöd vän dig het (1991)
- Tåla mod (2006)
