= Pubertet =

Book by Ivar Lo-Johansson

- First edition
- Author: Ivar Lo-Johansson
- Language: Swedish
- Genre: memoir
- Published: 1978
- Publisher: Bonniers
- Publication place: Sweden
- Awards: Nordic Council's Literature Prize of 1979

Pubertet ("Puberty") is a 1978 memoir by Swedish author Ivar Lo-Johansson. It won the Nordic Council's Literature Prize in 1979.
