= Ismael (novel) =

1977 novel by Klas Östergren

- First edition
- Author: Klas Östergren
- Language: Swedish
- Set in: Stockholm, Sweden
- Published: 1977
- Publisher: Albert Bonniers förlag
- Publication place: Sweden

Ismael is the second novel by Swedish author Klas Östergren. It was published in 1977.
