= Kerstin Norborg =

Swedish writer and poet (born 1961)

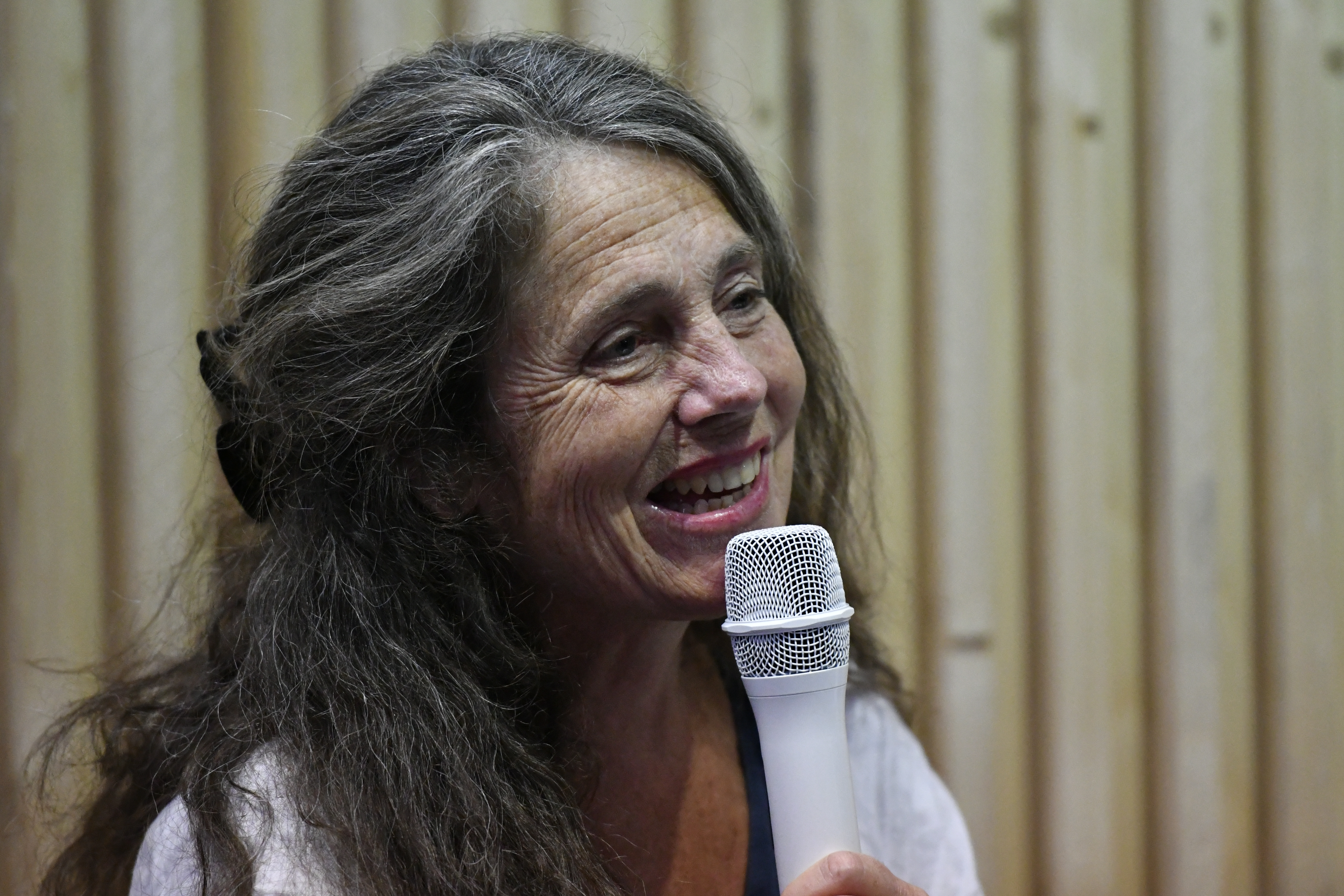
- Born: 1961 (age 64–65); Lund, Sweden
- Writing career
- Genres: poetry novel
- Notable work: Min faders hus
- Notable awards: Swedish Radio Prize; Gleerups Prize

Kerstin Norborg (born 1961 in Lund) is a Swedish writer and poet. She lives in Stockholm and works as a writing teacher at Öland's Folk High School. Her first poetry collection was Vakenlandet (Waking Land), 1994. She published a novel Min faders hus (House of Father), 2001. She won the Swedish radio prize (2002) and Gleerups prize (2002).

== Bibliography ==
- Min faders hus (in Swedish). ISBN 978-91-1-303150-7.
- Norborg, Kerstin (2005). Missed abortion (in Swedish). Norstedt. ISBN 978-91-1-301474-6.
- Norborg, Kerstin (2009-05-05). Kommer aldrig att få veta om hon hör (in Swedish). Norstedts. ISBN 978-91-1-302574-2.
- Norborg, Kerstin (2015-08-27). Marie-Louise (in Swedish). Norstedts. ISBN 978-91-1-306715-5.
- Norborg, Kerstin (1998). Så fort jag går ut: prosadikter (in Swedish). Norstedt. ISBN 978-91-1-300336-8.
