= Under i september =

1994 novel by Klas Östergren

- First edition
- Author: Klas Östergren
- Language: Swedish
- Set in: Österlen, Sweden
- Published: 1994
- Publisher: Albert Bonniers förlag
- Publication place: Sweden

Under i september (lit. Wonders in September) is the ninth novel by Swedish author Klas Östergren. It was published in 1994.
