= Frida Röhl =

Swedish actress and director (born 1971)

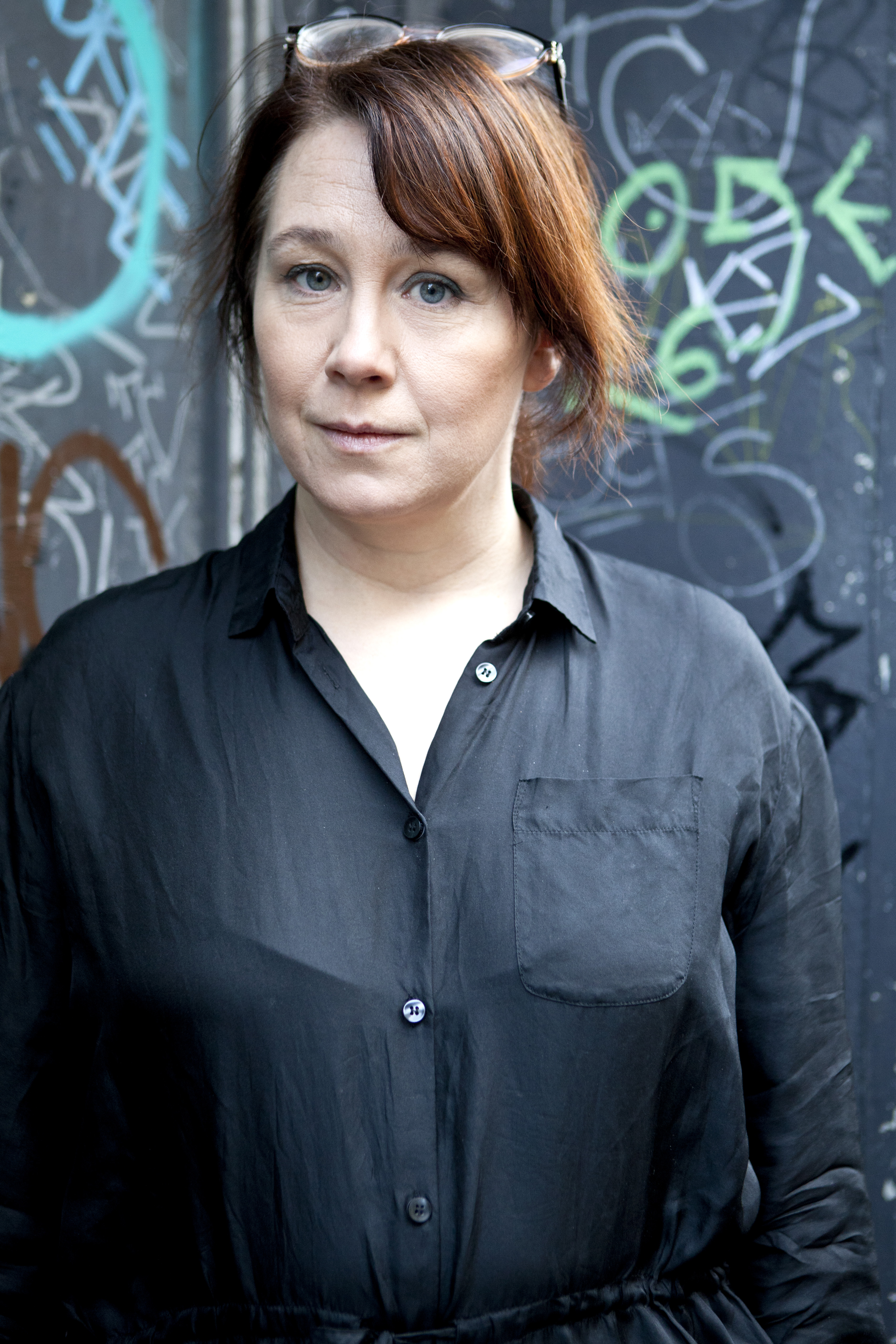
- Frida Röhl (2014)
- Born: 30 September 1971 (age 54); Klintehamn, Gotland, Sweden
- Occupation: Actress

Frida Karolina Röhl (born 30 September 1971) is a Swedish actress and director. Since 2004, she is the artistic director for Teater Tribunalen in Stockholm.

Röhl is educated at Teaterhögskolan in Malmö and she has become a known name also as a director. She also is a teacher at the Stockholm Academy of Dramatic Arts, and from March 2014 she is the director of Folkteatern in Gothenburg.

For television she has played the part of the countess Tessin in the drama series August and in 2009 she was part of the Julkalendern Superhjältejul which was broadcast on SVT. She has had a role in the film Gentlemen in 2014. The film was also shown as a four part TV series in 2016 on SVT. The four part series was also shown on Netflix. In 2018, she had a role in the SVT series Spring Tide. In 2024, she is director for the play Bobby Fischer bor i Pasadena at Folkteatern. She also directed Den goda människan i Sezuan, also at Folkteatern.

== Filmography ==
- 2007 – August
- 2009 – Superhjältejul
- 2012 – Odjuret
- 2012 – Call Girl
- 2014 – Gentlemen
- 2018 – Spring Tide
