= Sverrir Guðnason =

Swedish and Icelandic actor

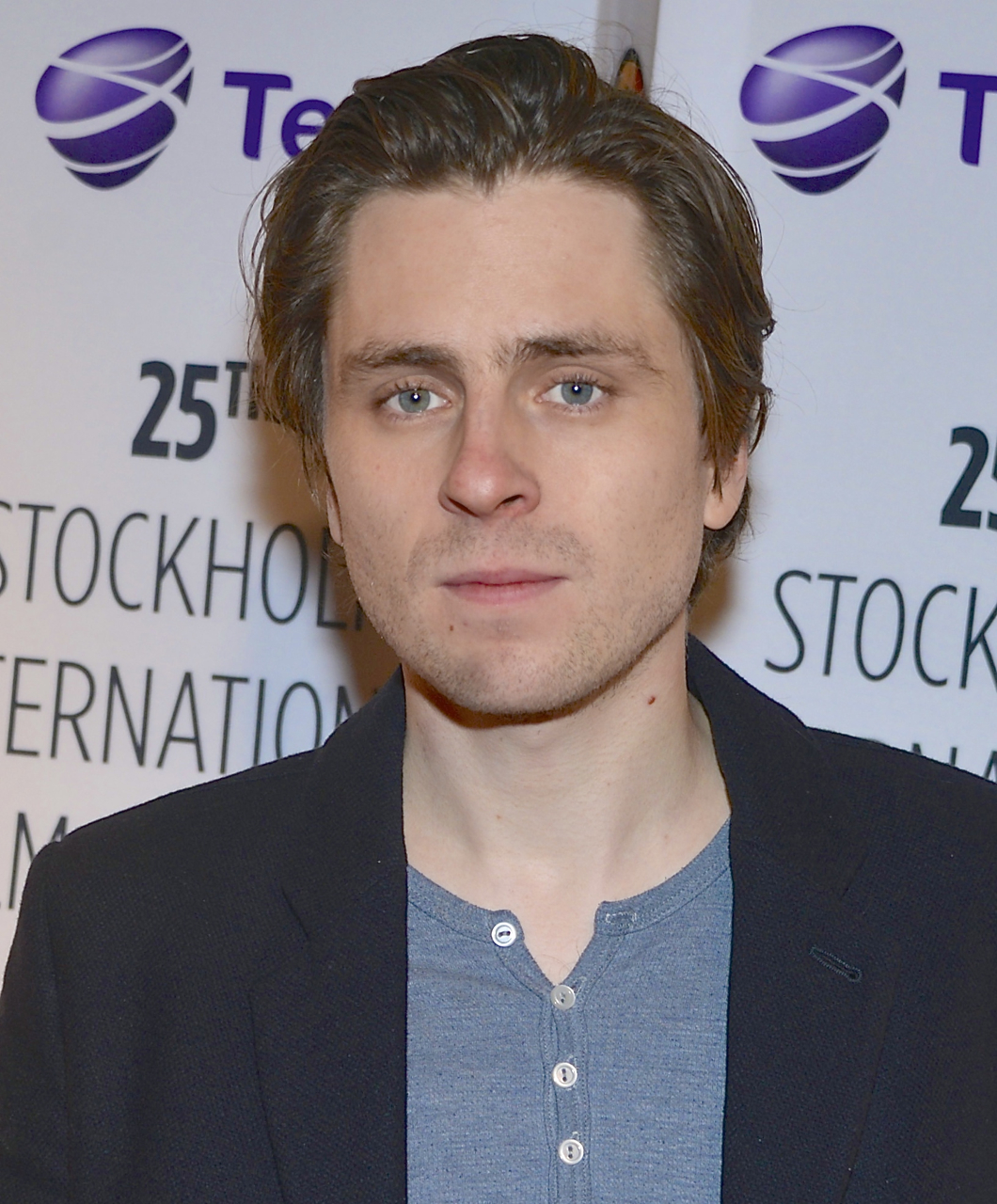
- Gudnason at the Stockholm International Film Festival in November 2014
- Born: 12 September 1978 (age 48); Lund, Sweden
- Occupation: Actor
- Years active: 1996–present

Sverrir Páll Guðnason (born 12 September 1978) is a Swedish and Icelandic actor.

== Life and career ==
Sverrir was born in Lund, Sweden, to Icelandic parents and raised in Reykjavík, Iceland. He first performed on stage in Heimsljós in the Reykjavík City Theatre and the same year he appeared in Áramótaskaupið. He moved with his family to Tyresö, Sweden, in 1990 when his father found work as a professor at the Royal Institute of Technology. At the 2009 Shanghai International Film Festival, he received an award for Best Actor for his role in the Swedish/Danish film Original. He has since played the role of Pontus Höijer in the second series of Wallander as well as leading roles in productions at both Gothenburg's and Stockholm's city theaters.

He was cast as Björn Borg in the 2017 film Borg vs McEnroe. In 2018, he played Mikael Blomkvist in the thriller The Girl in the Spider's Web. In the 2020 film Falling which was written, directed and played in by Viggo Mortensen, he plays the younger version of Willis a conservative father suffering from dementia.

== Personal life ==
Sverrir was born to Guðni A. Jóhannesson (1951-2023), the former Secretary General of the Icelandic National Energy Regulatory, and Bryndís Sverrisdóttir. His grandfather on his mother's side was Icelandic politician and banker Sverrir Hermannsson.

=== Honours ===
- Iceland: Knight of the Order of the Falcon (6 May 2025)

== Filmography ==
=== Film ===
Year	Title	Role	Notes
2001	Familjehemligheter	Bengan	
2001	Festival	Lukas	
2003	Sprickorna i muren	Jonny	
2003	Köftbögen		
2004	6 Points	Marcus	
2004	Miss Sweden	Conny	
2005	Den utvalde	Anders	
2006	Min frus förste älskare	Jonas	
2009	Original	Henry	
2011	Hur många lingon finns det i världen?	Alex	
2012	Mörkt vatten	Daniel	
2012	Call Girl	Krister	
2012	The Passion of Marie	Hugo Alfvén	
2013	Love and Lemons	David Kummel	
2013	Waltz for Monica	Sture Åkerberg	
2014	Gentlemen	Leo Morgan	
2014	Min så kallade pappa	Frank	
2014	Flugparken	Kille	
2015	The Circle	Max Rosenqvist	
2016	A Serious Game	Arvid Stjärnblom	
2017	Borg vs McEnroe	Björn Borg	
2018	The Girl in the Spider's Web	Mikael Blomkvist	
2018	Føniks	Nils	
2020	Charter	Mattias	
2020	Falling	Young Willis Peterson	
2020	The Book of Vision	Dr. Nils Lindgren	
2021	Omerta 6/12	Vasa Jankovic	
2023	Northern Comfort	Alphons	
2025	The Love That Remains	Maggi	

=== Television ===
Year	Title	Role	Notes
1996–1997	Sexton	Jonas	Miniseries; 16 episodes
1998	Nini		Unknown episodes
2000	Jesus lever	Felix Eriksson	Television film
2001	Nya tider	Björn "Nalle" Jepson	Unknown episodes
2001	En ängels tålamod		Episode #2.10
2002	Stora teatern	Oliver	Miniseries; 4 episodes
2003	Cleo	Jonas	6 episodes
2005	Kommissionen	Hampus	Episode: "Psaltaren 37:2"
2005	Lasermannen	Ralf	Miniseries; episode 1
2007	How Soon Is Now?	Tommy Berglund	Miniseries; 4 episodes
2008	Kungamordet	Rasmus Hamberg	Miniseries; 4 episodes
2009	183 dagar	Danny	2 episodes
2009	Hotell Kantarell	Spiken	Episode: "Åkes rosa period"
2009–2010	Wallander	Pontus	12 episodes
2010–2011	Drottningoffret	Rasmus Hamberg	Miniseries; 3 episodes
2015	Badehotellet	Ernst Bremer	3 episodes
2016	Gentlemen & Gangsters	Leo Morgan	Miniseries; 3 episodes
2023	Face to Face 3	Viktor Mallström	
