= Lars Green =

Swedish actor

- Born: 30 November 1944 (age 81); Stockholm, Sweden
- Occupation: Actor
- Years active: 1970-present

Lars Green (born 30 November 1944) is a Swedish actor. He has appeared in more than 30 films and television shows since 1970.

== Selected filmography ==
- Jänken (1970)
- Codename Coq Rouge (1989)
- Första Kärleken (1992)
- Svart Lucia (1992)
- Call Girl (2012)
