= Handelsmän och partisaner =

1991 novel by Klas Östergren

- First edition
- Author: Klas Östergren
- Language: Swedish
- Set in: Scania, Sweden
- Published: 1991
- Publisher: Albert Bonniers förlag
- Publication place: Sweden

Handelsmän och partisaner (lit. Merchants and Partisans) is the eight novel by Swedish author Klas Östergren. It was published in 1991.
