= Kristian Lundberg =

Swedish poet and writer (1966–2022)

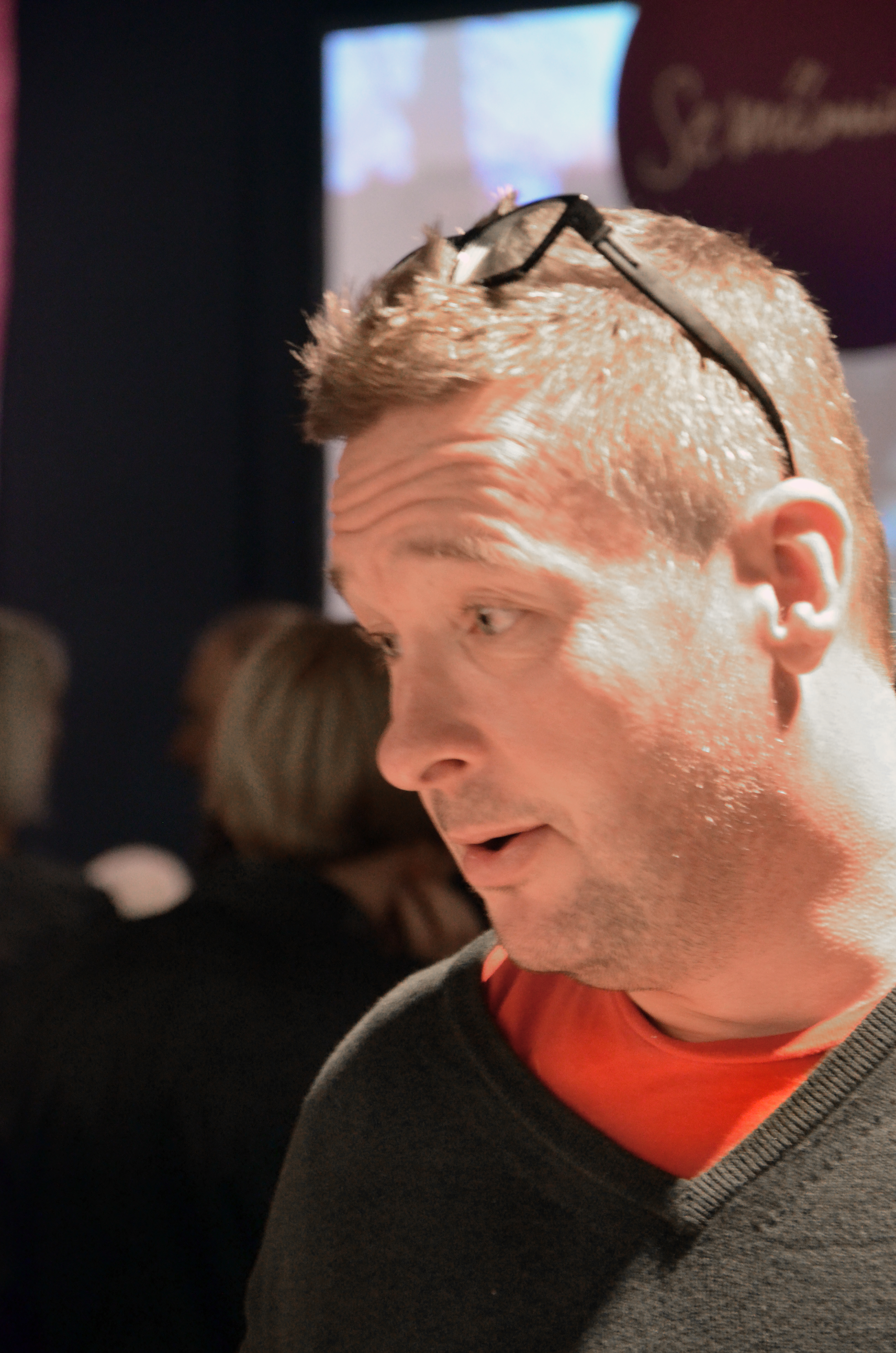
- Lundberg in 2013
- Born: 6 February 1966; Malmö S:t Pauli församling
- Died: 27 April 2022 (aged 56)
- Website: http://kristianlundberg.com/

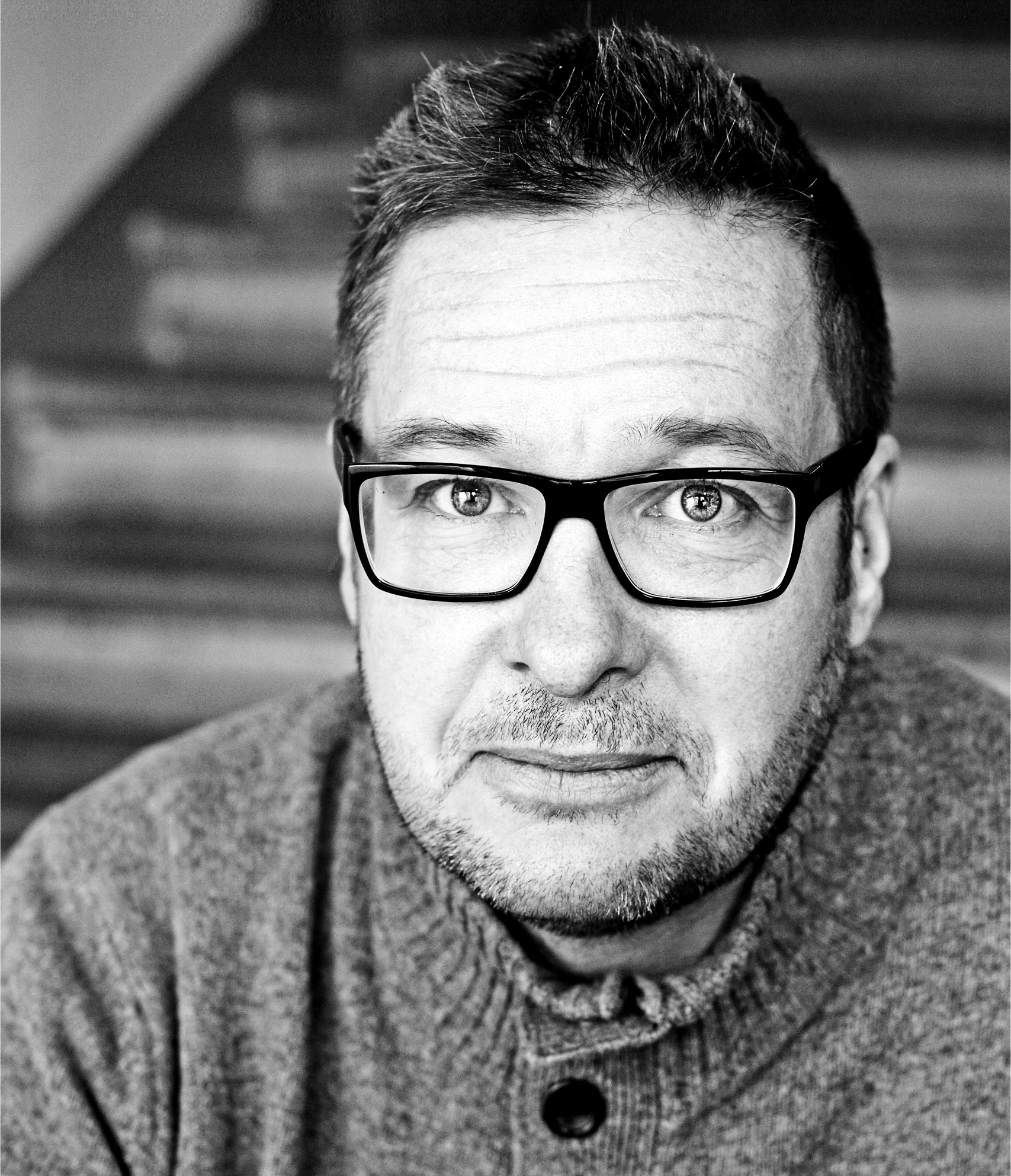
Lundberg in 2013

Nils-Kristian Lundberg (6 February 1966 – 27 April 2022) was a Swedish author. He was best known for his book Yarden published in 2012. His first book, Genom September, was published in 1991.
