= How Soon Is Now? (TV series) =

Swedish drama television series

- Written by: Peter Birro
- Directed by: Mikael Marcimain
- Starring: Sverrir Gudnason; Fanny Risberg; Simon J. Berger; Ruth Vega Fernandez
- Composer: Mattias Bärjed
- Country of origin: Sweden
- Original language: Swedish
- No. of episodes: 4

Production
- Producer: Christer Nilson
- Production locations: Gothenburg, Sweden
- Cinematography: Hoyte van Hoytema
- Editor: Kristofer Nordin
- Running time: 352 minutes
- Production company: GötaFilm

Original release
- Network: SVT1
- Release: 3 September – 24 September 2007

How Soon Is Now? (Swedish: Upp till kamp) is a 2007 Swedish drama television serial directed by Mikael Marcimain. The narrative portrays four people who grow up in Gothenburg between 1965 and 1976. The serial was produced for Sveriges Television, from a screenplay by Peter Birro.

== Cast ==
- Sverrir Gudnason as Tommy Berglund
- Fanny Risberg as Lena Lindblom
- Simon J. Berger as Erik Westfeldt
- Ruth Vega Fernandez as Rebecka Söderström
- Johan Kylén as Ingvar Berglund
- Anna Bjelkerud as Karin Berglund
- Mikaela Knapp as Anna Berglund
- Ida Redig as Annica
