= Plåster =

1986 novel by Klas Östergren

- First edition
- Author: Klas Östergren
- Language: Swedish
- Published: 1986
- Publisher: Albert Bonniers förlag
- Publication place: Sweden

Plåster (lit. Plaster) is the sixth novel by Swedish author Klas Östergren. It was published in 1986. The novel is about Roland, a night porter, who ends up in the hospital after suffering from heart problems. There he meets Yngve, a cigarette dealer who is also a patient. They start talking about the big questions: life, death, friendship and love. When Roland finally manages to take things seriously in his life, he realises that everything may already be too late.
