= Ankare =

1988 novel by Klas Östergren

- First edition
- Author: Klas Östergren
- Language: Swedish
- Set in: Scania, Sweden
- Published: 1988
- Publisher: Albert Bonniers förlag
- Publication place: Sweden

Ankare (lit. Anchors) is the seventh novel by Swedish author Klas Östergren. The novel follows an alcoholic fisherman living in Österlen. It was published in 1988.
