= David Fukamachi Regnfors =

Swedish actor (born 1984)

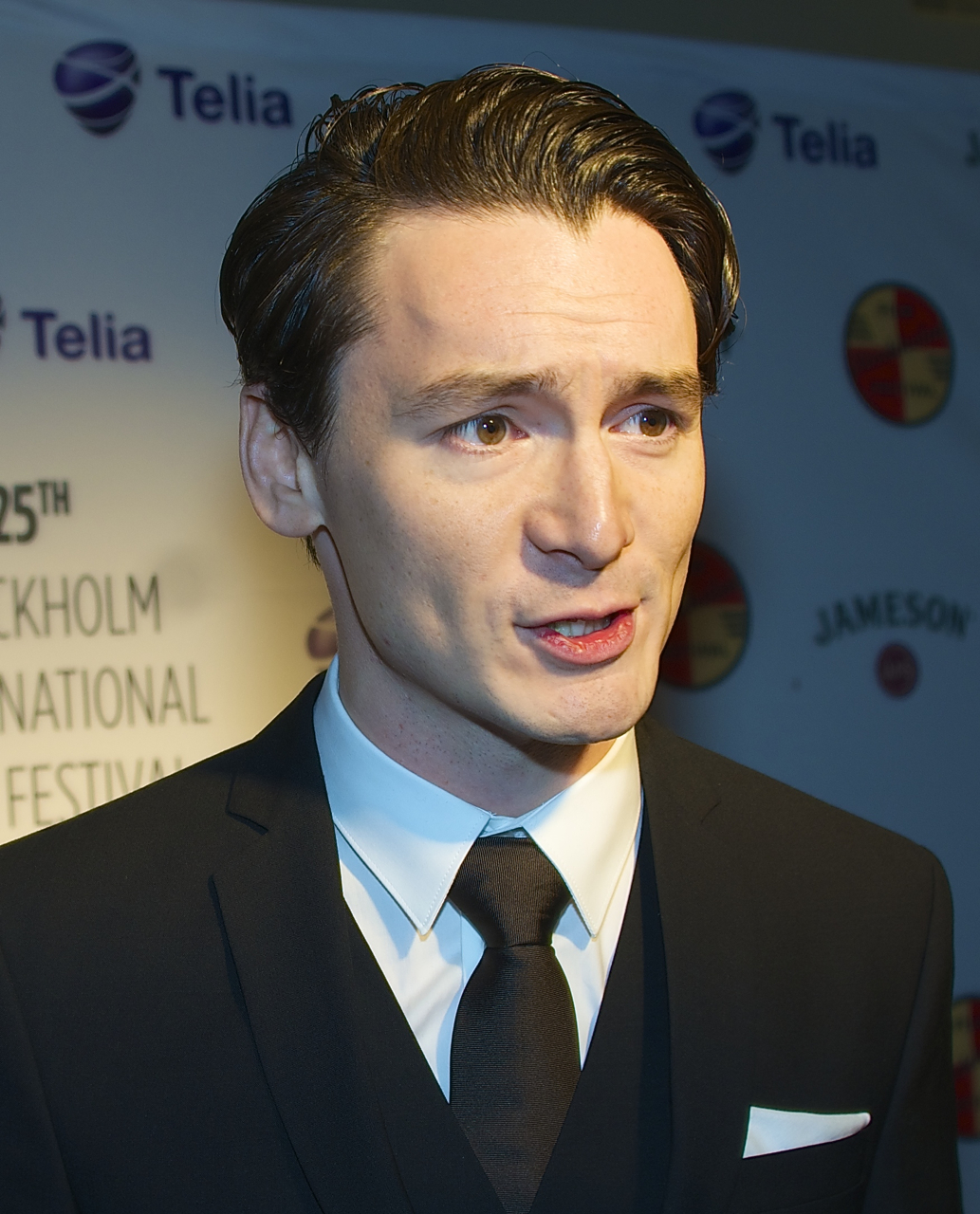
- Born: Motokazu David Mårten Fukamachi Regnfors; 11 April 1984 (age 42); Sweden
- Occupation: Actor
- Years active: 2010–present

David Fukamachi Regnfors (born 11 April 1984) is a Swedish actor.

Regnfors' father is Japanese and his mother is Swedish. He was born in Sweden, but spent his first year of life in Japan. His parents had met on a kibbutz in Israel. When his parents separated, he moved with his mother to Sweden. He attended high school at the Stockholm Theatre Elementary School and graduated from the Theatre Academy in Gothenburg in 2010.

== Filmography ==
- Call Girl (2012)
- Hotell (2013)
- Gentlemen (2014)

== Theatre ==
In 2011, Fukamachi Regnfors performed a one-person show, Farfar var Samuraj (och dödade massa amerikaner), at Pusterviksteatern, Gothenburg, about his grandfather, who was a kamikaze pilot in the Second World War. He said that part of the aim of the play was to encourage people to think critically, rather than relying on the first Wikipedia page to come up in a search. Linda Johansson, writing in Tidningen Kulturen, described the show as serious and moving.

Fukamachi Regnfors appeared in Alcestis by Euripides at the Royal Dramatic Theatre in 2021, directed by Elli Papakonstantious.
