= Lasermannen (TV series) =

2005 Swedish TV miniseries

- Genre: Drama
- Written by: Ulf Ryberg
- Directed by: Mikael Marcimain
- Starring: David Dencik; Sten Ljunggren; Sten Johan Hedman
- Composer: Malou Meilink
- Country of origin: Sweden
- No. of episodes: 3

Production
- Executive producer: Marianne Gray
- Producer: Susann Billberg-Rydholm
- Production locations: Stockholm, Sweden
- Cinematography: Hoyte van Hoytema
- Editor: Mattias Morheden
- Running time: 3 × 90 min
- Production company: SVT Drama

Original release
- Network: SVT
- Release: 23 November – 7 December 2005

Lasermannen ("The Laserman") is a Swedish miniseries directed by Mikael Marcimain and produced by SVT Drama. It is based on real events, as portrayed in the bestselling book Lasermannen – en berättelse om Sverige by Gellert Tamas, about the Lasermannen events. It is not to be confused with the Swedish documentary also released in 2005, called "Lasermannen (en dokumentär)".

== Story ==
The three-part mini series takes place in Stockholm over a time period of the 1970's, 80's and early 90's and realistically depicts the intense real-life police investigation of a series of brutal shootings against immigrants which shook entire Swedish society in the early 90's, and the story is entwined with depictions of the political atmosphere in society and life in Stockholm at that time, and the tragic story of the infamous lone-wolf racist serial shooter John Ausonius, the perpetrator suffering from identity complex, played by "look-alike" actor David Dencik. The mini-series aim to show how Swedish society could look like and feel like for various people back then.

== Cast ==
- David Dencik – John Ausonius
- Sten Ljunggren – Lennart Thorin
- Sten Johan Hedman – Thorstensson
- Amanda Ooms – Ilse
- Kenneth Milldoff – Lars-Erik Forss
- Ralph Carlsson – Stefan Bergqvist
- Leif Andrée – Tommy Lindström
- Pale Olofsson – Eklind
- Per Morberg – Prisoner
