= Attila (novel) =

1975 novel by Klas Östergren

- First edition
- Author: Klas Östergren
- Language: Swedish
- Set in: Stockholm, Sweden
- Published: 1975
- Publisher: Albert Bonniers förlag
- Publication place: Sweden

Attila is the debut novel by Swedish author Klas Östergren. It was published in 1975.
