= The Son of a Servant =

Book by August Strindberg

1913 edition published by G. P. Putnam's Sons

The Son of a Servant (Swedish: Tjänstekvinnans son) is the autobiographical novel of August Strindberg in four parts, published between 1886 and 1909. It relates the story of Strindberg's childhood, which was affected by poverty, neglect, emotional insecurity, and the influence of his grandmother's religious fanaticism on his life.

A translation in English by Claud Field (1863–1941) was published by G. P. Putnam's Sons in 1913.
