= Fattiga riddare och stora svenskar =

1983 novel by Klas Östergren

- First edition
- Author: Klas Östergren
- Language: Swedish
- Set in: Stockholm, Sweden
- Published: 1983
- Publisher: Albert Bonniers förlag
- Publication place: Sweden
- ISBN: 978-9100456047

Fattiga riddare och stora svenskar (lit. 'Poor Knights and Great Swedes') is the fifth novel by Swedish author Klas Östergren. It was published in 1983.
