= Jack (Lundell novel) =

1976 novel by Ulf Lundell

- 1976 edition
- Author: Ulf Lundell
- Language: Swedish
- Set in: Gotland and Stockholm, Sweden, early 1970s
- Publisher: Wahlström & Widstrand
- Publication date: April 5, 1976
- Publication place: Sweden

Jack is the first novel by Swedish writer, composer and musician Ulf Lundell, published in 1976.
