= Gentlemen (novel) =

1980 novel by Klas Östergren

- First edition
- Author: Klas Östergren
- Translator: Tiina Nunnally
- Language: Swedish
- Set in: Stockholm
- Publisher: Albert Bonniers förlag
- Publication date: 19 September 1980
- Publication place: Sweden
- English publication date: 2007
- ISBN: 91-0-044-964-4

Gentlemen is the fourth novel by Swedish author Klas Östergren, published in 1980. It was Östergrens breakthrough as a novelist and is regarded as a modern classic in Swedish literature. Taking influence from Raymond Chandler, the novel has been described as "simultaneously celebrating and mourning the post-WWII era with its jazz music, poetry, hidden treasures, and espionage."

It is the first book in a trilogy of novels that was followed by Gangsters (2005) and Renegater (2020). Gentlemen was translated into English by Tiina Nunnally in 2007. A film adaptation, Gentlemen, directed by Mikael Marcimain, was released in 2014.

== Plot summary ==
The novel is set in the late 1970s Stockholm. The narrator, Klas Östergren, is a young writer who shares the name with the author of the novel. He picks up a commission to write a pastiche of Strindberg's The Red Room, updating its political satire to mark the centenary of its publication.

Soon after, Klas finds out that he has been burgled on nearly all of his belongings. In a local boxing club he meets the elegant and charismatic Henry Morgan, a boxer, pianist and an ebullient if unreliable raconteur. Henry persuades Klas to move into his apartment, where he lives with his mentally unstable brother Leo.

The second part of the novel tells the story of the Morgan brother's previous life. A picaresque story of Henry as, among other things, a smuggler of false passports to East Berlin, and Leo who finds out about a political scandal concerning Swedish sales of weapons to nazi-Germany during World War II.

In the third part of the novel, Henry and Leo both mysteriously disappear, and Klas finds himself living alone in the apartment. He burns up his unsuccessful attempt to write a pastiche of The Red Room and begin to write a new story, the story about the Morgan brothers.

== Critical reception ==
Kate Saunders in The Times called it an "exuberant, complicated thriller and literary tour de force", and said that "The unravelling of the mystery is extremely compelling, and highly imaginative."

Reviewing the book for Financial Times, Jonathan Gibbs said: "The book reads like an update of a Raymond Chandler mystery for the May 1968 generation. If Chandler’s Philip Marlowe was a white knight in a cheap suit, Klas and Henry, too, are gentlemen, with a real moral sense underlying their outrageous behaviour. The book’s heart-palpitatingly lovely final pages will make you thankful that Ostergren, after 25 years, finally wrote a sequel."

Katherine Marino in the New York Sun called it "an elegantly written work of metafiction", comparing Östergren's writing to that of Paul Auster and Haruki Murakami.
