= Alone (novella) =

Book by August Strindberg

- Author: August Strindberg
- Original title: Ensam
- Language: Swedish
- Published: 1903
- Publication place: Sweden

Alone (Swedish: Ensam) is a novella from 1903 by Swedish writer August Strindberg. The protagonist is a 50-year-old writer who has returned to Stockholm after spending several years in the countryside. The novel has been subject to treatment by a number of literary researchers. An English translation of the novella by Arvid Paulson was published under the title Days of Loneliness (New York: Phaedra, 1971).
