= Fantomerna =

1978 Klas Östergren novel

- First edition
- Author: Klas Östergren
- Language: Swedish
- Set in: Stockholm, Sweden
- Published: 1978
- Publisher: Albert Bonniers förlag
- Publication place: Sweden

Fantomerna (lit. The Phantoms) is the third novel by Swedish author Klas Östergren. It was published in 1978.
