= Krilon =

Novel series by Eyvind Johnson

First editions

Krilon is a trilogy of novels by the Swedish author Eyvind Johnson, Grupp Krilon ("Group Krilon", 1941), Krilons resa ("Krilon's journey", 1942), Krilon själv ("Krilon himself", 1943), published in one volume as Krilon in 1948.

Written and published during World War II, the novel is partly a realistic story set in contemporary Stockholm and partly an allegory of the events during the war that criticises nazism and fascism, as well as Sweden's neutrality during the war.

== Plot summary ==
The main character is Johannes Krilon, a middle aged real estate broker in Stockholm. He has formed a conversation group with six middle class friends that regularly meet to discuss various topics. Krilon's business is eventually attacked by two real estate rivals and he struggles to keep his group united against the aggression.

== Literary style ==
Eyvind Johnson stated that he with the Krilon novels wanted to "give a holistic picture of the world as I saw it myself and in the form I like best, the novel's". With this ambition Johnson combined a variety of literary styles such as allegory, realism, symbolism, satire, parody, journalism, stream of consciousness, adventure novel and espionage novel.

The Krilon novels are seen as a work in modernist literature supposed to have drawn influence from James Joyce's novel Ulysses, and also from authors such as Marcel Proust, Thomas Mann and John Dos Passos mixture of different styles and genres. The essays of Michel de Montaigne are also believed to have been significant influences on the novels.

== Allegory ==
Literary scholars have interpreted the main character Johannes Krilon as representing Winston Churchill's role during World War II, and that the members of his discussion group represents European states that struggled to remain united against the aggression. Krilon's rivals G.Staph (the name alluding to Gestapo) and T.Jekau (name alluding to Cheka) represents Nazi Germany and Joseph Stalin's Soviet Union, while Krilon's American friend Frank D. Lind represents Franklin D. Roosevelt.

== Critical reception ==
The novel was generally praised by the leading contemporary Swedish critics. Anders Österling wrote that it was "the most original achievement in our modern prose literature". In his 1990 Eyvind Johnson biography, Örjan Lindberger hailed it as an outstanding work in Johnson's production.
