= Twist (Östergren novel) =

2014 novel by Klas Östergren

- First edition
- Author: Klas Östergren
- Language: Swedish
- Set in: Stockholm, Sweden
- Published: 2014
- Publisher: Natur & Kultur
- Publication place: Sweden

Twist is the thirteenth novel by Swedish author Klas Östergren. It was published in 2014.
