= Den sista cigaretten =

2009 novel by Klas Östergren

- First edition
- Author: Klas Östergren
- Language: Swedish
- Set in: Stockholm, Sweden
- Published: 16 October 2009
- Publisher: Albert Bonniers förlag
- Publication place: Sweden

Den sista cigaretten (lit. The Last Cigarette) is the twelfth novel by Swedish author Klas Östergren. It was published in 2009.
