= Klas Östergren =

Swedish novelist

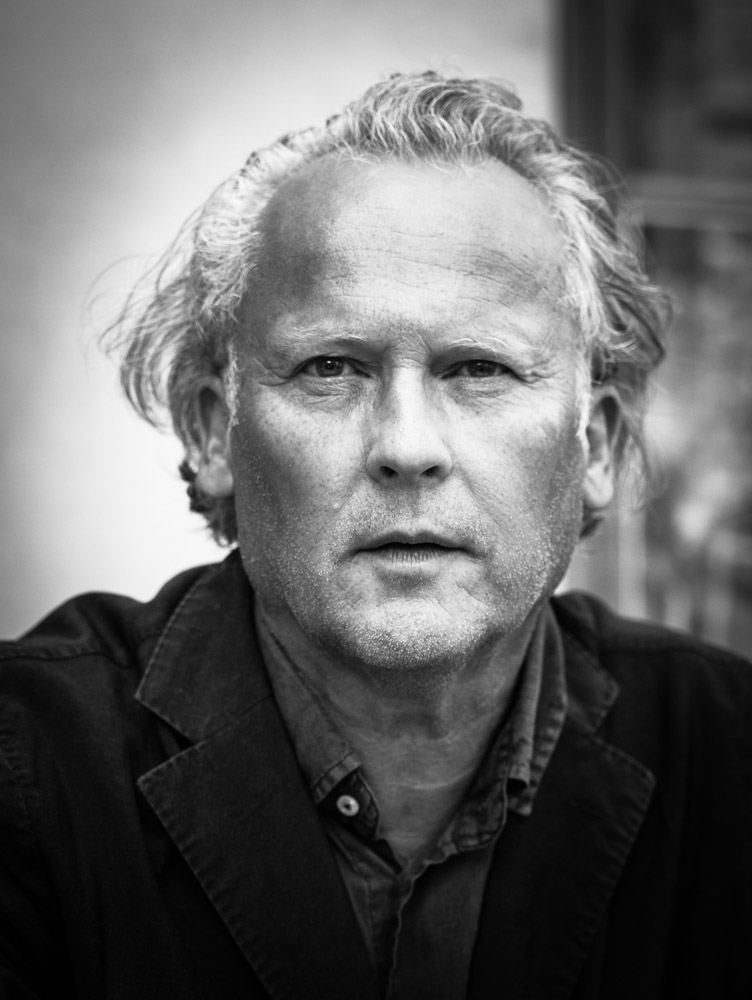
- Born: 20 February 1955 (age 71); Stockholm, Sweden
- Occupations: Novelist, screenwriter, translator
- Spouses: Pernilla August (m. 1982; div. 1989): Cilla Östergren
- Children: 4
- Writing career
- Period: 1975–present
- Genre: Literary
- Notable works: Gentlemen; Gangsters

Klas Östergren (born 20 February 1955) is a Swedish novelist, short story writer, screenwriter, and translator.

Östergren had a breakthrough with his fourth novel Gentlemen in 1980. He has been awarded numerous Swedish literary prizes, such as Doblougska priset in 1998 and the grand prize by the literary society, Samfundet De Nio in 2005, as well as being nominated for the Guldbagge Award for Best Screenplay in 1999. His works have been translated to more than ten languages. In 2014 he was elected a member of the Swedish Academy, but resigned from his seat in 2018.

== Biography ==
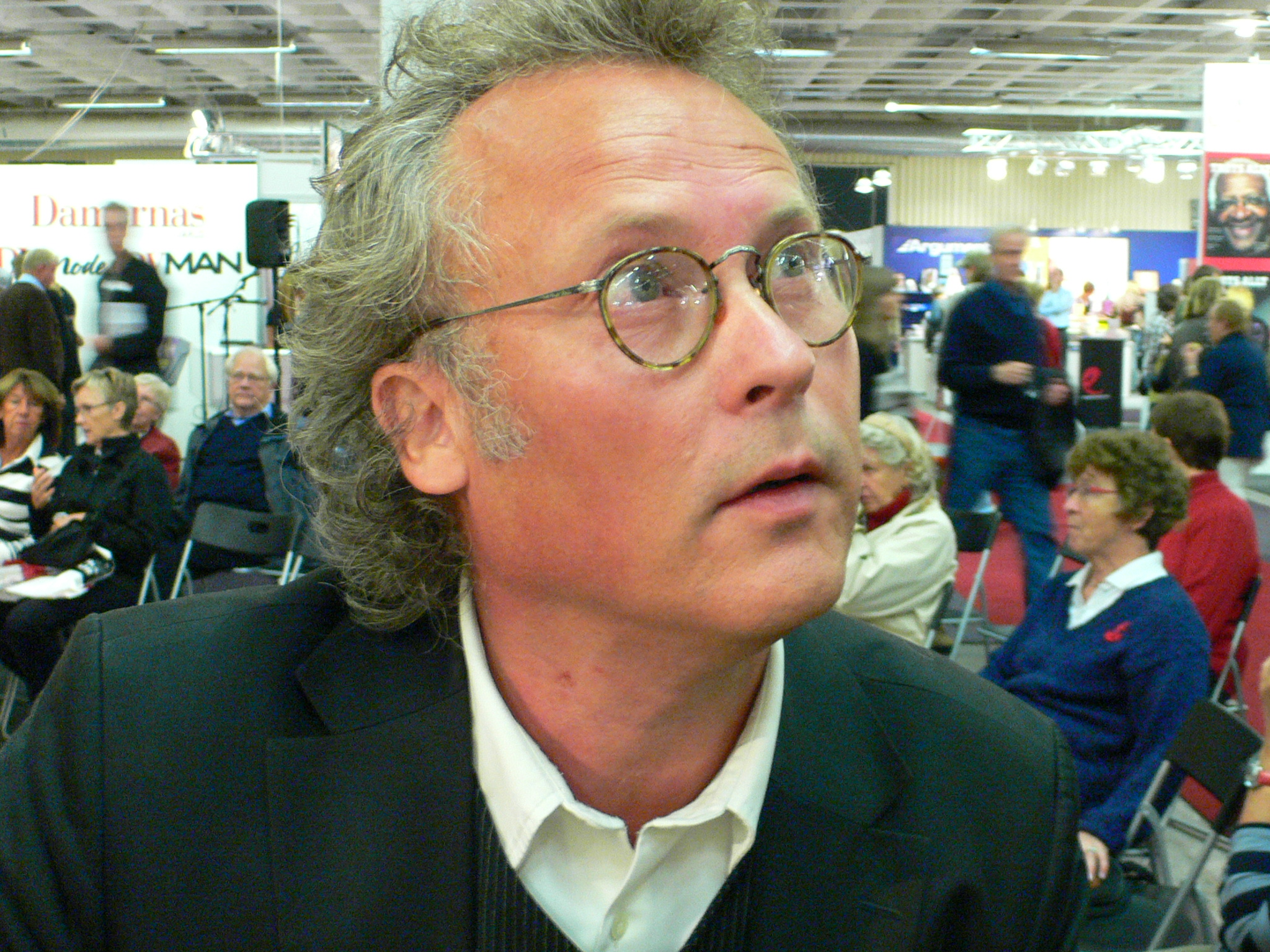
Klas Östergren in 2007.

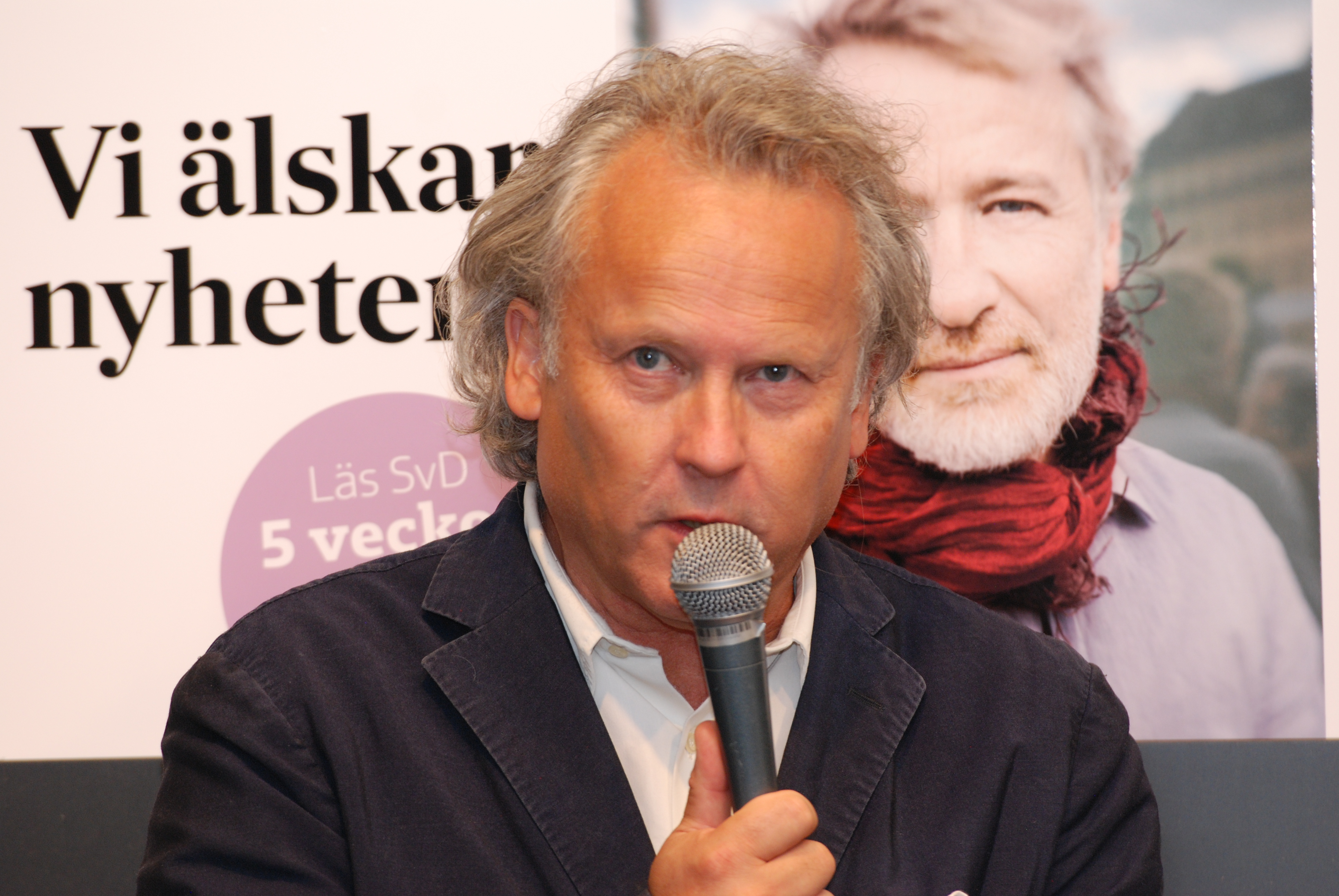
Klas Östergren in 2014.

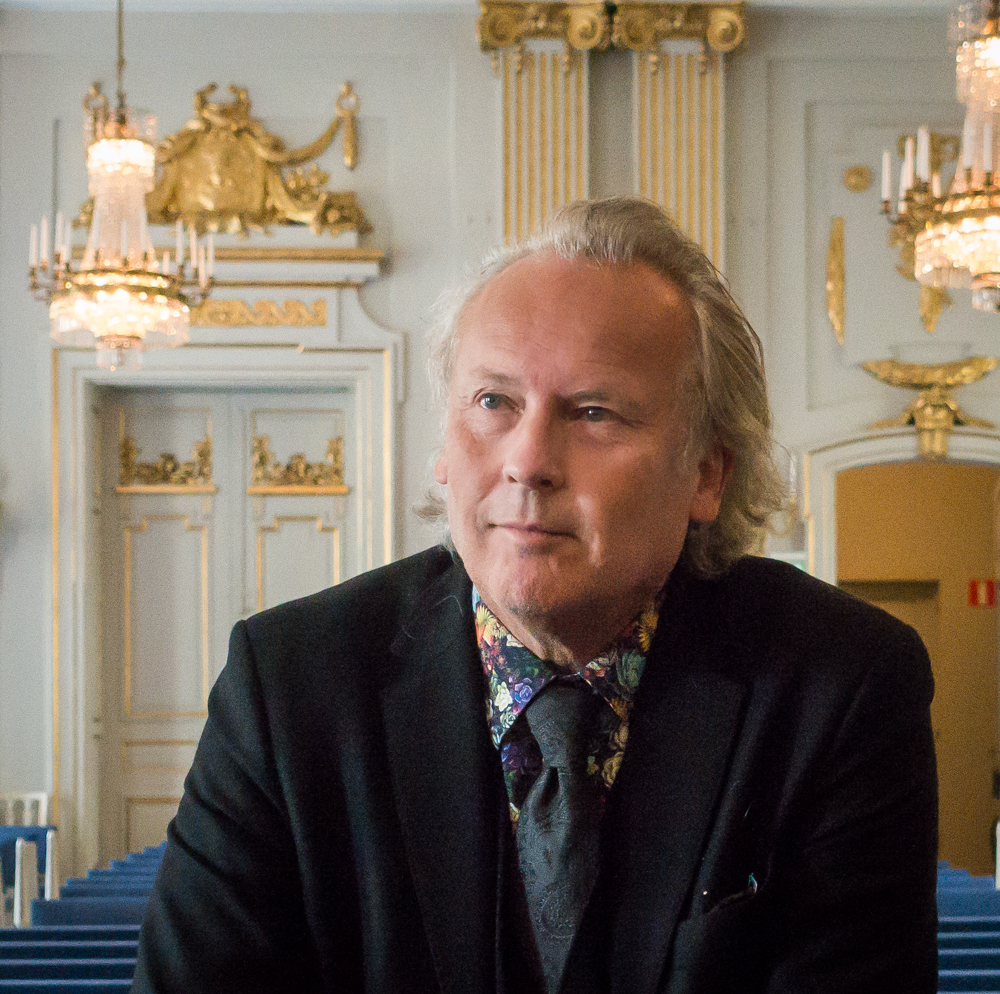
Klas Östergren at the Swedish Academy in 2017.

Östergren was born in 1955 on Lilla Essingen in Stockholm. He was the youngest of four siblings. His father was Finnish and his mother was Swedish. He went to secondary school at Södra Latins gymnasium.

Klas Östergren was soon to turn twenty years old when his first novel, Attila, was published in 1975. He gained critical acclaim and high readership five years later with the novel, Gentlemen. A sequel to the novel, Gangsters, appeared in 2006. Östergren's works, which also includes acclaimed novels such as Den sista cigaretten (2009, "The last cigarette") and short stories, typically depicts odd characters that leads the narrator into a shadowworld of the official society where its own laws and rules is prevailing.

As a writer of screenplays and teleplays, he was honored in 1999 when Veranda för en tenor [Waiting for the Tenor], the screen treatment (which he co-wrote with Lisa Ohlin) of a short story from Med stövlarna på och andra berättelser, was nominated for the Guldbagge Award for Best Screenplay (Sweden's equivalent of the Academy Award). He is also one of his country's most highly regarded literary translators, having published a Swedish-language version of J. D. Salinger's The Catcher in the Rye and also having translated a two-volume edition (issued in September 2008) of the plays of Henrik Ibsen.

From 1982 to 1989, Klas Östergren was married to Swedish actress, Pernilla Wallgren, who subsequently continued her career using the name Pernilla Östergren. They became the parents of a daughter, Agnes; and following their divorce and Pernilla's marriage to director Bille August (his daughter's now ex-stepfather), she appeared, using her new professional name, Pernilla August, in two films for which Östergren wrote the screenplays. The first, 1996's Jerusalem, adapted from the novel by Selma Lagerlöf, was directed by her husband, Bille August, and the other, Offer och gärningsmän, was a 1999 miniseries directed for Sweden's national television broadcaster, SVT, by Tomas Alfredson. His second and current wife is Cilla, with whom he has three children, Åke, Gösta, and Märta.

The 1980 novel Gentlemen was filmed in 2014 by director Mikael Marcimain. He has been awarded numerous Swedish literary prizes and his works have been translated to at least a dozen languages.

Östergren succeeded Ulf Linde in seat 11 of the Swedish Academy on 20 December 2014, but he announced on 6 April 2018 that he would no longer participate in the academy's work. In May 2018, the Swedish Academy announced that Östergren and three other members had been allowed to formally resign.

== Bibliography ==
- Attila (novel, 1975)
- Ismael (novel, 1977)
- Fantomerna (novel, 1978)
- Gentlemen (Swedish: Gentlemen, novel, 1980) (English translation by Tiina Nunnally, 2007)
- Giganternas brunn (novella, 1981)
- Slangbella (article collection, 1983)
- Fattiga riddare och stora svenskar (novel, 1983)
- Plåster (novel, 1986)
- Hoppets triumf (illustrated by Torsten Jurell, 1986)
- Ankare (novel, 1988)
- Ge mig lite sodavatten. En opera buffa (1988)
- Handelsmän och partisaner (novel, 1991)
- Under i september (novel, 1994)
- Med stövlarna på och andra berättelser (short story collection, 1997)
- Konterfej (novella, 2001)
- Tre porträtt (novella collection, 2002)
- Östergren om Östergren (with Stephen Farran-Lee, 2007)
- Gangsters (Swedish: Gangsters, novel, 2005) (English translation by Tiina Nunnally, 2009)
- The Hurricane Party (Swedish: Orkanpartyt, novel, 2007) (English translation by Tiina Nunnally, 2009)
- Den sista cigaretten (novel, 2009)
- Ravioli (short story, 2013)
- Ulf Linde. Svenska Akademiens Inträdestal (2014)
- Twist (novel, 2014)
- Samlade noveller (collected short stories and novellas, 2015)
- I en skog av sumak (novel, 2017)
- Hilde (novel, 2019)
- Renegater (novel, 2020)
- Två pistoler (novel, 2021)
- Julrevy i Jonseryd och andra berättelser (short stories, 2021)
- Större trygghet aldrig fanns (novel, 2022)
- Klenoden (novel, 2025)

== Filmography ==
=== Writer ===
- Mördande intelligens (screenplay, 1995)
- Jerusalem (screenplay, 1996)
- Veranda för en tenor (short story and screenplay, 1998)
- Offer och gärningsmän (TV miniseries screenplay, 1999)
- Soldater i månsken (TV miniseries screenplay, 2000)
- Syndare i sommarsol (screenplay, 2001)
- The Marriage of Gustav III (screenplay, 2001)
- Röd jul (short story and screenplay, 2001)
- Evil (screenplay (non-credited), 2003)
- En decemberdröm (TV series screenplay, 2005)
- Gentlemen (novel and screenplay, 2014)

=== Actor ===
- Mackan (1977)
- False as Water (1985)
- Soldater i månsken (speaker, 2000)
- Call Girl (2012)

Cultural offices
Preceded by Ulf Linde	Swedish Academy, Seat No.11; 2014–2018	Succeeded by Mats Malm
