= Ruth Vega Fernandez =

Swedish-Spanish actress

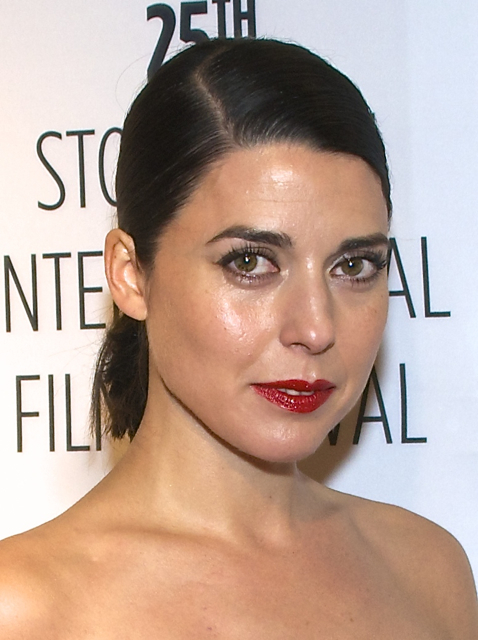
- Stockholm International Film Festival 2014
- Born: Ruth Fernández Martín; 12 April 1977 (age 48); Canary Islands, Spain
- Occupation: Actress
- Website: Blog on Elle

Ruth Vega Fernandez (née Ruth Fernández Martín; born 12 April 1977 on Canary Islands) is a Spanish-Swedish actress. She is known for her roles in Call Girl and Gentlemen.

She has studied at Balettakademien.

== Filmography ==
- Upp till kamp (2007)
- Not like Others (2008)
- Mellan oss (2008)
- Sommaren med Göran (2009)
- Johan Falk: Vapenbröder (2009)
- Johan Falk - Gruppen för särskilda insatser (2009)
- Johan Falk - National Target (2009)
- Wallander - arvet (2010)
- Kyss mig (2011)
- Johan Falk: Spelets regler (2012)
- Johan Falk: Organizatsija Karayan (2012)
- Johan Falk: De 107 patrioterna (2012)
- Johan Falk - Barninfiltratören (2012)
- Annika Bengtzon: En plats i solen (2012)
- Call Girl (2012)
- Johan Falk - kodnamn: Lisa (2013)
- Gentlemen (2014)
- The Circle (2015)
- Ares (2016)
- Gentlemen & Gangsters (2016)
- Cannabis (2016)
- Infektionen (2018)
- Royaume (2018)
- October Passed Me By (2022)
- À mon seul désir (2022)
- Albert (2022)
- Cannes Confidential (2023)
- Romy & Laure... Happées par le Trou Spatio-Temporel! (2023)
- Ondskan (2023)
