= Ivar Lo-Johansson =

Swedish writer

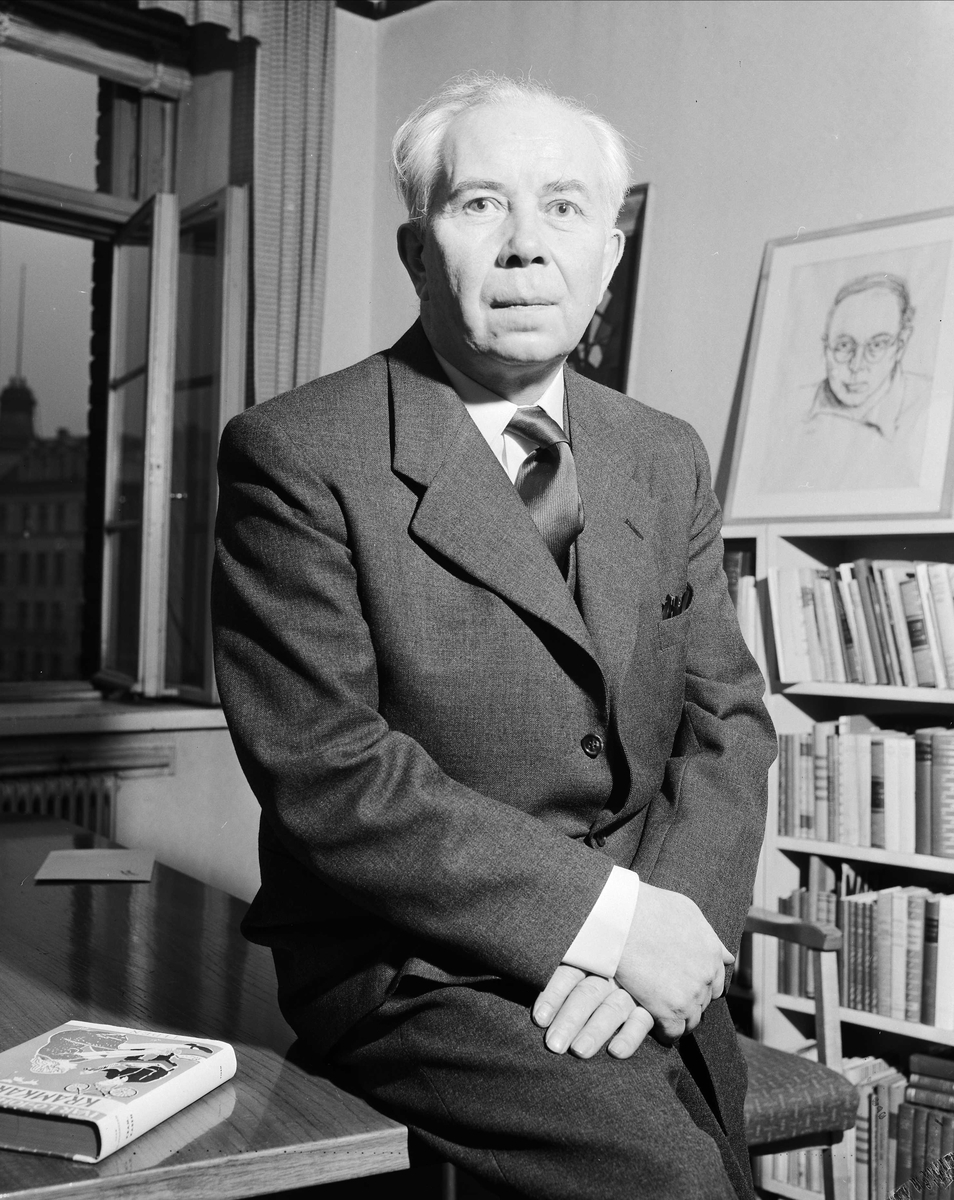
- Ivar Lo-Johansson in November 1953
- Born: Ivar Johansson; 23 February 1901; Ösmo, Sweden
- Died: 11 April 1990 (aged 89); Stockholm, Sweden
- Writing career
- Period: 1927–1990

Ivar Lo-Johansson (23 February 1901 – 11 April 1990) was a Swedish writer of the proletarian school. His autobiographical 1978 memoir, Pubertet (Puberty), won the Nordic Council's Literature Prize in 1979.

== Biography ==
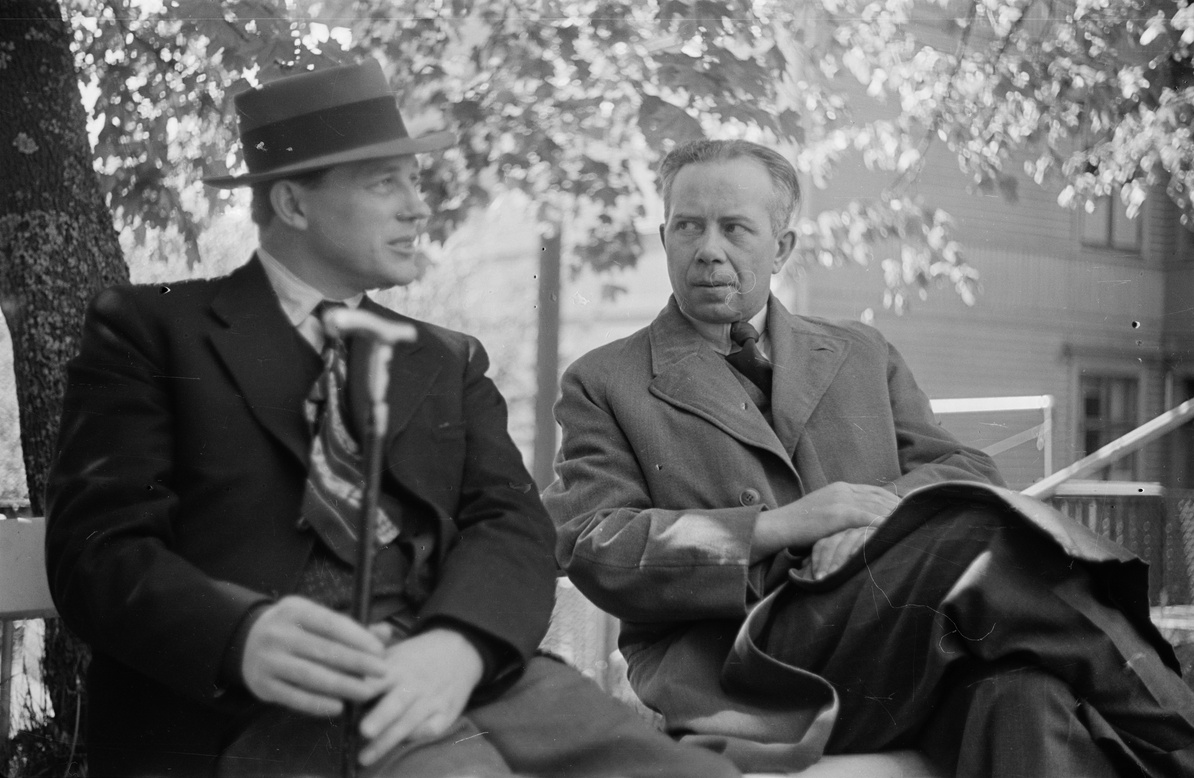
Harry Martinson and Ivar Lo-Johansson (right)

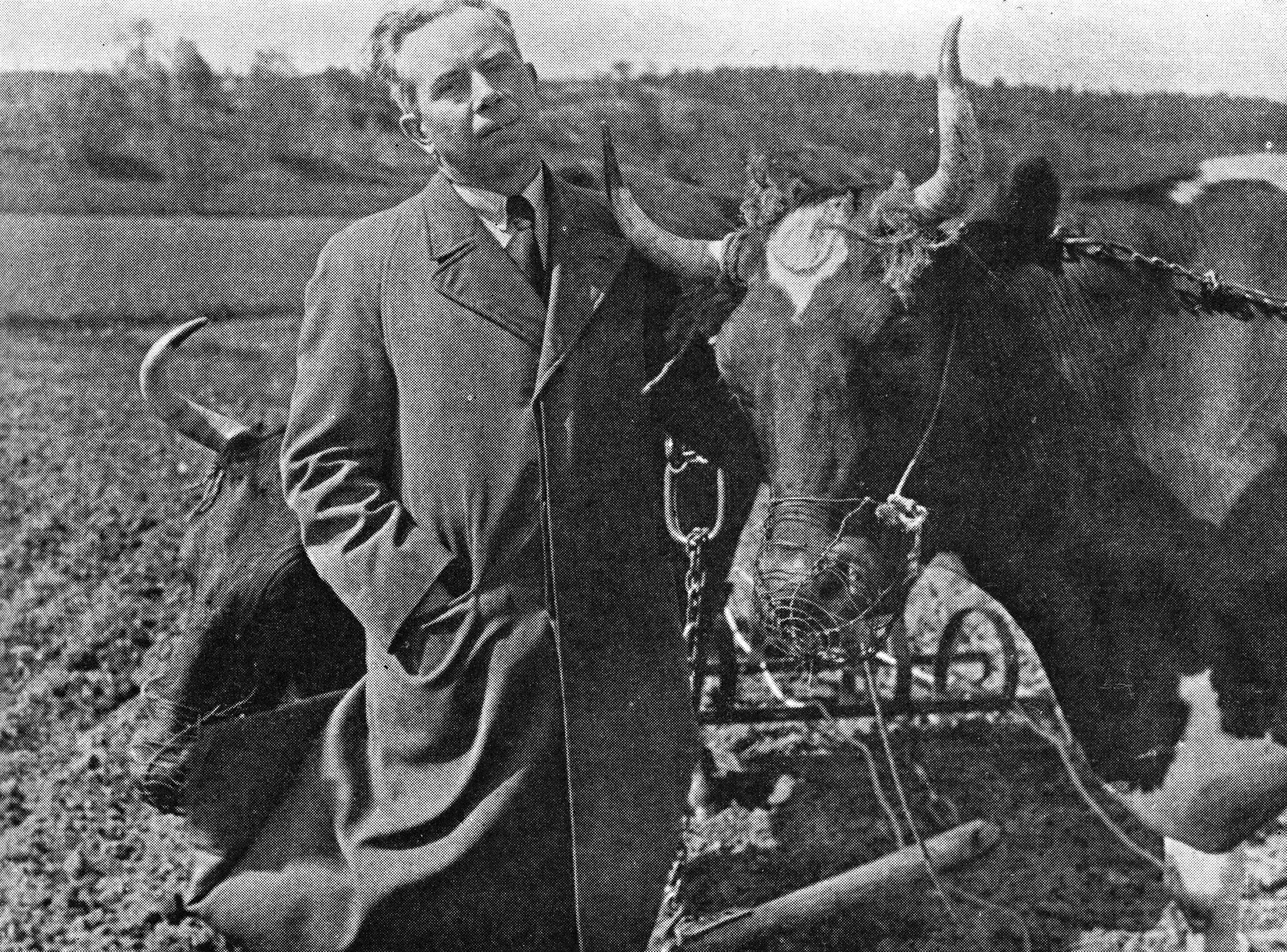
Ivar Lo-Johansson on a farm.

Born Ivar Johansson in Ösmo in a family of agricultural labourers hired per year, he began using the name Ivar Lo-Johansson in his twenties, claiming "Lo" was a family name. Unsuccessfully trying to register the name, he was eventually registered by Swedish authorities as Karl Ivar Loe.

In the 1920s, Ivar Lo-Johansson travelled in Europe. His early books were travel books depicting the working-class in France and England.

Ivar Lo-Johansson wrote over 50 proletarian novels and short-stories, all of which carried vivid portrayals of working-class people. He described the situation of the Swedish land-workers, statare, in his novels, short stories, and journalism, which encouraged the adoption of certain land reforms in Sweden. He also caused much controversy with his features on old-age pensioners, gypsies, and other non-privileged people. He died, aged 89, in Stockholm.

Ivar Lo-Johansson lived since 1934 in an apartment on Bastugatan in Stockholm, which shortly after his death in 1990 was turned into a museum.

== Works ==
Lo-Johansson first came to the literary fore in the mid-1930s with the publication of his novel Godnatt, jord (Good night, earth, 1933) and two short story collections. His stories were infused with realistic and detailed depictions of the plight of landless Swedish peasants, known as statare. The first of his collection of short stories to be published was Statarna I–II (1936–37; The Sharecroppers), followed by his Jordproletärerna (1941; Proletarians of the Earth). Autobiographical to a large extent, these works were nevertheless more than one man's story. They were a potent attack on the prevalent social conditions, especially the inequality in Swedish society. Lo-Johansson's books combined political astuteness and literary craftsmanship to such a competent degree that they are regarded as the stimulant behind the labor movement that ultimately led to the abolition of indentured farm labor in 1945.

Lo-Johansson is best known for his memoirs, vivid recollections of the life in Swedish trade-unionist and literary circles of the twenties, thirties and forties. He also continued throughout his long life to insist that literature should face the world from the under-dog's perspective.

Lo-Johansson's works are characterized by a vivid expression of individual human suffering. A great example of this motif is character of the farm servant's wife in the novel Bara en mor (1939, Only A Mother). He also explored the conflict between individualism and collectivism extensively in his autobiographical series of eight novels. He published the series in the 1950s beginning with Analfabeten (1951, The Illiterate). He published the last book in the series, Proletärförfattaren (The Proletarian Writer) in 1960. In the 1970s, he wrote numerous short stories dealing with the seven deadly sins. Following his acclaimed memoir Pubertet (1978, Puberty), he wrote a series of three further memoirs Asfalt (1979, Asphalt), Tröskeln (1982, The Threshold) and Frihet (1985, Freedom).

== Legacy ==
Ivar Los park on Mariaberget, Stockholm is named after him. There is a 1991 bronze bust of Lo-Johansson by Nils Möllerberg in the park on Bastugatan.

The Ivar Lo Society preserves his apartment in Stockholm as a museum.

The Stockholm city library describes Lo-Johansson as "one of our greatest proletarian writers" and an "innovator of Swedish realistic prose, engaged with social issues like care of the elderly and the question of tied labour." The Swedish Trade Union Confederation awards an annual literary prize named in his honour; he was also the first recipient in 1986.

== Bibliography ==
- Vagabondliv i Frankrike (1927)
- Kolet i våld. Skisser från de engelska gruvarbetarnas värld (1928)
- Ett lag historier (1928)
- Nederstigen i dödsriket. Fem veckor i Londons fattigvärld (1929)
- Zigenare. En sommar på det hemlösa folkets vandringsstigar (1929)
- Mina städers ansikten (1930)
- Jag tvivlar på idrotten (1931)
- Måna är död (1932)
- Godnatt, jord (1933)
- Kungsgatan (1935)
- Statarna (1936–37)
- Jordproletärerna (1941)
- Bara en mor (1939)
- Traktorn (1943)
- Geniet (1947)
- "En proletärförfattares självbiografi" (1951–60)
  - Analfabeten (1951)
  - Gårdfarihandlaren (1953)
  - Stockholmaren (1954)
  - Journalisten
  - Författaren
  - Socialisten
  - Soldaten
  - Proletärförfattaren
- Elektra Kvinna år 2070 (1967)
- "Passionssviten" (1968–72)
- Lyckan (1962)
- Astronomens hus (1966)
- Ordets makt (1973)
- Lastbara berättelser (1974)
- Memoirs (1978–85)
  - Pubertet. (1978)
  - Asfalt. (1979)
  - Tröskeln. (1982)
  - Frihet. (1985)
- Till en författare (1988)
- Skriva för livet (1989)
- Blå jungfrun (posthumous, 1990)
- Tisteldalen (posthumous, 1990)
