= Gangsters (novel) =

2005 novel by Klas Östergren

- First edition
- Author: Klas Östergren
- Translator: Tiina Nunnally
- Language: Swedish
- Set in: Stockholm
- Publisher: Albert Bonniers förlag
- Publication date: 2005
- Publication place: Sweden
- English publication date: 2009
- Pages: 439
- ISBN: 91-0-010798-0

Gangsters is the tenth novel by Swedish author Klas Östergren, published in 2005. It is a free-standing sequel from 1980 novel Gentlemen.

It was translated into English by Tiina Nunnally in 2009.
