= August Prize =

Swedish literary prize

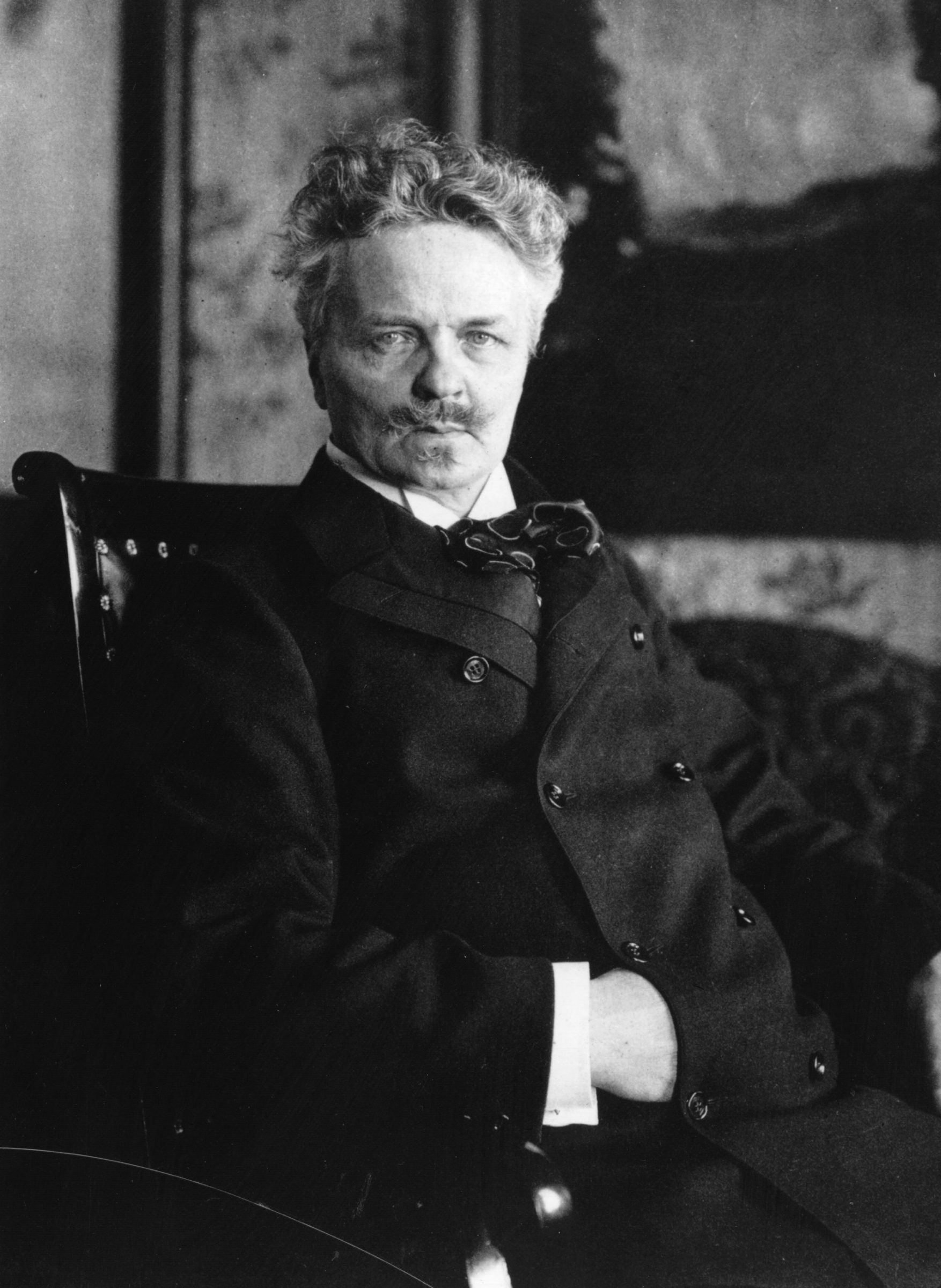
- Awarded for: the best Swedish books of the year that will increase public interest in Swedish contemporary literature
- Sponsored by: Swedish Publishers' Association (SvF), Elite Hotels of Sweden
- Date: 12 April 1988 (started awarding in 1989)
- Location: Stockholm
- Country: Sweden
- Presented by: Swedish Publishers' Association (SvF)
- Rewards: An August figurine and a monetary award of SEK 100,000
- Website: augustpriset.se

The August Prize (Swedish: Augustpriset) is an annual Swedish literary prize awarded each year since 1989 by the Swedish Publishers' Association. It is awarded to the best Swedish book of the year in each of three categories. The Swedish Publishers' Association also awards the Young August Prize (Lilla Augustpriset) to youth and young adults (age 20 or younger).

== Prize ==
In the years 1989–1992, the prize was awarded in one general category. Since 1992, the prize has been awarded in the categories Fiction, Non-Fiction, and Children's and Youth Literature. The prize is named after the writer August Strindberg.The sculpture was made by Swedish artist Mikael Fare.

== Selection ==
All Swedish publishers may submit nominations for the award. In each category, a jury shortlists six titles each. These titles are then read and voted on by an assembly of 63 electors, 21 in each category. The electors come from across the country, and comprise booksellers, librarians and literary critics. The books receiving the largest number of votes in each category win the prize.

The prizes are handed out at a gala in Stockholm. Winners receive 100,000 Swedish krona and a bronze statuette by the artist Michael Fare.

== Winners and nominees ==
=== Best book (1989–1991) ===
Year	Winner	Work		Shortlisted nominees
1989	Cecilia Lindqvist (1932–2021)	Tecknens rike (lit. 'The Empire of Signs')	Bonniers	Bengt Emil Johnson, Bland orrar och kor (lit. 'Among Grouse and Cows') (Bonniers); Kjell Johansson, Gogols ansikte (lit. 'Gogol's Face') (Bonniers); Sun Axelsson, Nattens årstid (lit. 'The Season of the Night') (Norstedts); Lars Sjögren, Sigmund Freud – mannen och verket (lit. 'Sigmund Freud – The Man and His Works') (Natur & Kultur); Tor-Ivan Odulf, Skymningen gör dårarna oroliga (lit. 'Dusk Makes the Fools Anxious') (Författarförlaget)
1990	Lars Ahlin (1915–1997)	De sotarna! De sotarna! (lit. 'The Chimney Sweepers! The Chimney Sweepers!')	Bonniers	Olof Lagercrantz, Ett år på sextiotalet (lit. 'One Year in the Sixties') (Wahlström & Widstrand); Kerstin Ekman, Knivkastarens kvinna (lit. 'The Knife Thrower's Woman') (Bonniers); Torbjörn Säfve, Kuperad lek eller Skändaren från Skänninge (lit. 'Hilly Play or Skändaren from Skänninge') (Prisma); Anders Ehnmark, Slottet (lit. 'The Castle') (Norstedts); Ernst Brunner, Sorgen per capita (lit. 'Sorgen per Capita') (Bonniers)
1991	Sven Delblanc (1931–1992)	Livets ax (lit. 'Ear of Life')	Bonniers	Erland Josephson, Föreställningar (lit. 'Performances') (Brombergs); Birgitta Lillpers, Iris, Isis och Skräddaren (lit. 'Iris, Isis and the Tailor') (Wahlström & Widstrand); Katarina Frostenson, Joner (lit. 'Ions') (Wahlström & Widstrand); Per Olov Enquist, Kapten Nemos bibliotek (lit. 'Captain Nemo's Library') (Norstedts); Göran Sonnevi, Trädet (lit. 'The Tree') (Bonniers)

=== Fiction ===
Year	Winner	Work		Shortlisted nominees
1992	Niklas Rådström (b. 1953)	Medan tiden tänker på annat (lit. 'When Time Thinks About Other Things')	Gedins	Per Olov Enquist, Kartritarna (lit. 'The Cartographers') (Norstedts); Sigrid Combüchen, Korta och långa kapitel (lit. 'Short and Long Chapters') (Norstedts); Tua Forsström, Parkerna (lit. 'The Parks') (Bonniers); Peter Kihlgård, Strandmannen (lit. 'The Beach Man') (Bonnier Alba); Sven Lindqvist, Utrota varenda jävel (lit. 'Exterminate Every Bastard') (Bonniers)
1993	Kerstin Ekman (b. 1933)	Händelser vid vatten (lit. 'Events by Water') (trans. Blackwater)	Bonniers	Agneta Pleijel, Fungi (Norstedts); Birgitta Lillpers, Medan de ännu hade hästar (lit. 'While They Still Had Horses') (Wahlström & Widstrand); Magnus Dahlström, Nedkomst (lit. 'Parturition') (Bonnier Alba); Werner Aspenström, Ty (lit. 'For') (Bonniers); Bo Carpelan, Urwind (Bonniers)
1994	Björn Ranelid (b. 1949)	Synden (lit. 'The Sin')	Bonnier Alba	Carola Hansson, Andrej (Bonniers); Ulla Isaksson, Boken om E (lit. 'The Book about E') (Bonniers); Bodil Malmsten, Den dagen kastanjerna slår ut är jag långt härifrån (lit. 'The Day the Chestnuts Bloom, I'm Far from Here') (Bonniers); Arne Johnsson, Fåglarnas eldhuvuden (lit. 'The Birds' Fire Heads) (Symposion); Nina Burton, Resans syster, poesin (lit. 'Sister of Voyage: The Poetry') (FIBs Lyrikklubb and Tiden)
1995	Torgny Lindgren (1938–2017)	Hummelhonung (lit. 'Bumblebee Honey') (trans. Sweetness)	Norstedts	Henning Mankell, Comédia infantil (lit. 'Infant Comedy') (Ordfront); Lennart Göth, En ny påminnelse om (lit. 'A New Reminder') (Bonniers); Magnus Florin, Trädgården (lit. 'The Garden') (Bonniers); Monika Fagerholm, Underbara kvinnor vid vatten (lit. 'Wonderful Women by the Water') (Bonniers); Marie Hermanson, Värddjuret (lit. 'The Animal Host') (Bonniers)
1996	Tomas Tranströmer (1931–2015)	Sorgegondolen (lit. 'The Sorrow Gondola')	Bonniers	Björn Runeborg, En tid i Visby (lit. 'A Time in Visby') (Bonnier Alba); Fredrik Ekelund, Jag vill ha hela världen! (lit. 'I Want the Whole World!') (Bonniers); Sara Lidman, Lifsens rot (lit. 'The Root of Life'); (Bonniers); Lars Gustafsson, Variationer över ett tema av Silfverstolpe (lit. 'Variations on the Theme of Silfverstolpe') (Natur & Kultur); Jesper Svenbro, Vid budet att Santo Bambino di Aracoeli slutligen stulits av maffian (lit. 'At the News that the Santo Bambino di Aracoeli Finally Has Been Stolen by the Mafia') (Bonniers)
1997	Majgull Axelsson (b. 1947)	Aprilhäxan (lit. 'April Witch')	Gedins	Elisabeth Rynell, Hohaj (Bonniers); Kjell Johansson, Huset vid Flon (lit. 'The House at Flon') (Norstedts); Eva Runefelt, Mjuka mörkret (lit. 'Soft Darkness') (Bonniers); Göran Sonnevi, Mozarts tredje hjärna (lit. 'Mozart's Third Brain') (Bonniers); Per Holmer, Svindel (lit. 'Dizziness') (Wahlström & Widstrand)
1998	Göran Tunström (1937–2000)	Berömda män som varit i Sunne (lit. 'Famous Men Who Have Visited Sunne')	Albert Bonniers förlag	Elsie Johansson, Mosippan (Bonniers); Göran Sonnevi, Klangernas bok (lit. 'The Book of Sounds') (Bonniers); Sigrid Combüchen, Parsifal (Norstedts); Per Christian Jersild, Sena sagor (Bonniers); Magnus Florin, Syskonen (lit. 'The Siblings') (Bonniers)
1999	Per Olov Enquist (1934–2020)	Livläkarens besök (lit. 'The Visit of the Royal Physician')	Norstedts	Stewe Claeson, Stämma i havet (lit. 'Voice in the Sea') (Norstedts); Inger Edelfeldt, Det hemliga namnet (lit. 'The Secret Name') (Norstedts); Kerstin Ekman, Vargskinnet – Guds barmhärtighet (lit. 'Wolfskin – God's Mercy') (Albert Bonniers Förlag); Katarina Frostenson, Korallen (lit. 'The Coral') (Wahlström & Widstrand); Björn Runeborg, Väduren (lit. 'Aries') (Albert Bonniers Förlag)
2000	Mikael Niemi (b. 1951)	Populärmusik från Vittula (lit. 'Popular Music from Vittula')	Norstedts	Göran Greider, Världen efter kommunismen (lit. 'The World after Communism') (Albert Bonniers Förlag); Carola Hansson, Den älskvärde (lit. 'The Lovable') (Norstedts); Lars Jakobson, I den Röda Damens slott (lit. 'In the Red Lady's Castle') (Albert Bonniers Förlag); Åke Smedberg, Hässja (lit. 'Hay Fence') (Albert Bonniers Förlag); Kerstin Strandberg, Tio syskon i en ömtålig berättelse (lit. 'Ten Siblings in a Delicate Story') (Albert Bonniers Förlag)
2001	Torbjörn Flygt (b. 1964)	Underdog	Norstedts	Per Olov Enquist, Lewis resa (lit. 'Lewis's Journey') (Norstedts); Maja Lundgren, Pompeji (lit. 'Pompeii') (Albert Bonniers Förlag); Kerstin Norborg, Min faders hus (lit. 'My Father's House') (Norstedts); Eva Runefelt, I djuret (lit. 'In the Animal') (Albert Bonniers Förlag); Jan Henrik Swahn, Vandrarna (lit. 'The Hikers') (Albert Bonniers Förlag)
2002	Carl-Johan Vallgren (b. 1964)	Den vidunderliga kärlekens historia (lit. 'The Story of Monstrous Love') (trans. The Horrific Sufferings of the Mind-Reading Monster Hercules Barefoot)	Albert Bonniers Förlag	Lars Andersson, Berget (lit. 'The Mountain') (Albert Bonniers Förlag); Aase Berg, Forsla fett (lit. 'Transfer Fat') (Albert Bonniers Förlag); (Lotta Lotass, Band II. Från Gabbro till löväng (lit. 'Band II. From Gabbro to Deciduous Meadow') (Albert Bonniers Förlag); Elisabeth Rynell, Till Mervas (lit. 'To Mervas') (Albert Bonniers Förlag); Torkel S. Wächter, Ciona – en självbiologi (lit. 'Ciona – An Autobiology') (Alfabeta)
2003	Kerstin Ekman (b. 1933)	Skraplotter (lit. 'Lottery Scratchcards')	Albert Bonniers Förlag	Sigrid Combüchen, En simtur i sundet (lit. 'A Swim in the Sound') (Norstedts); Folke Isaksson, Stenmästaren (lit. 'The Stonemason') (Albert Bonniers Förlag); Eva-Marie Liffner, Imago (Natur & Kultur); Steve Sem-Sandberg, Ravensbrück (Albert Bonniers Förlag); Anne Swärd, Polarsommar (lit. 'Polar Summer') (Wahlström & Widstrand)
2004	Bengt Ohlsson (b. 1963)	Gregorius	Albert Bonniers Förlag	Per Olov Enquist, Boken om Blanche och Marie (lit. 'The Story of Blanche and Marie') (Norstedts); Lotta Lotass, Tredje flykthastigheten (lit. 'Third Escape Rate') (Albert Bonniers Förlag); Agneta Pleijel, Mostrarna och andra dikter (lit. 'The Aunts and Other Poems') (Norstedts); Kerstin Strandberg, En obeskrivlig människa (lit. 'An Indescribable Man') (Albert Bonniers Förlag); Tomas Tranströmer, Den stora gåtan (lit. 'The Great Enigma') (Albert Bonniers Förlag)
2005	Monika Fagerholm (b. 1961)	Den amerikanska flickan (lit. 'The American Girl')	Albert Bonniers Förlag	Per Gunnar Evander, I min ungdom speglade jag mig ofta (lit. 'In My Youth, I Often Reflected') (Albert Bonniers Förlag); Ann-Marie Ljungberg, Simone de Beauvoirs hjärta (lit. 'Simone de Beauvoir's Heart') (Alfabeta); Lotta Lotass, Skymning: gryning (lit. 'Dusk: Dawn') (Albert Bonniers Förlag); Kristian Lundberg, Job (Brutus Östlings Bokförlag Symposion); Klas Östergren, Gangsters (Albert Bonniers Förlag)
2006	Susanna Alakoski (b. 1962)	Svinalängorna (lit. 'The Swine Rows') (trans. Beyond)	Albert Bonniers Förlag	Jörgen Gassilewski, Göteborgshändelserna (lit. 'The Gothenburg Events') (Albert Bonniers Förlag); Lars Gustafsson, Den amerikanska flickans söndagar (lit. 'The American Girl's Sundays') (Atlantis); Jonas Hassen Khemiri, Montecore: en unik tiger (lit. 'Montecore: The Silence of the Tiger') (Norstedts); Göran Sonnevi, Oceanen (lit. 'The Ocean') (Albert Bonniers Förlag); Sara Stridsberg, 'Drömfakulteten' (lit. 'The Faculty of Dreams') (Albert Bonniers Förlag)
2007	Carl-Henning Wijkmark (1934–2020)	Stundande natten (lit. 'Night Approaching')	Norstedts förlag	Beate Grimsrud, Har någon sett mig någon annanstans? (lit. 'Has Anyone Seen Me Anywhere Else?') (Albert Bonniers Förlag); Åsa Linderborg, Mig äger ingen (lit. 'No One Owns Me') (Bokförlaget Atlas); Torgny Lindgren, Norrlands Akvavit (lit. 'Norrlands Acquavit') (Norstedts); Ulf Karl Olov Nilsson, Synopsis (Symposion); Daniel Sjölin, Världens sista roman (lit. 'The World's Last Novel') (Norstedts)
2008	Per Olov Enquist (1934–2020)	Ett annat liv (lit. 'A Different Life')	Norstedts förlag	Eva-Stina Byggmästar, Men hur små poeter finns det egentligen (lit. 'But How Small Poets Really Are There') (Wahlström & Widstrand); Katarina Frostenson, Tal och regn (lit. 'Speech and Rain') (Wahlström & Widstrand); Sara Mannheimer, Reglerna (lit. 'The Rules') (Wahlström & Widstrand); Malte Persson, Edelcrantz förbindelser (lit. 'Edelcrantz Connections') (Albert Bonniers Förlag); Bruno K. Öijer, Svart som silver (lit. 'Black and Silver') (Wahlström & Widstrand)
2009	Steve Sem-Sandberg (b. 1958)	De fattiga i Łódź (lit. 'The Poor in Łódź') (trans. The Emperor of Lies)	Albert Bonniers Förlag	Eva Adolfsson, En liten historia (lit. 'A Little Story') (Albert Bonniers Förlag); Johannes Anyuru, Städerna inuti Hall (lit. 'The Towns Inside the Hall') (Norstedts); Per Agne Erkelius, Hotel Galicja (lit. 'Hotel Galicia') (Norstedts); Aris Fioretos, Den siste greken (lit. 'The Last Greek') (Norstedts); Ann Jäderlund, Vad hjälper det en människa om hon häller rent vatten över sig i alla sina dagar (lit. 'What Good is it to a Person if She Pours Clean Water on Herself All Her Days') (Albert Bonniers Förlag)
2010	Sigrid Combüchen (b. 1942)	Spill. En damroman (lit. 'Spill: A Lady's Novel')	Norstedts	Magnus Florin, Ränderna (lit. 'The Stripes') (Albert Bonniers Förlag); Johan Jönson, Livdikt (lit. 'Life Poem') (Albert Bonniers Förlag); Sara Stridsberg, Darling River (Albert Bonniers Förlag); Peter Törnqvist Kioskvridning 140 grader – En wästern (lit. 'Kiosk Rotation 140 Degrees – A Western') (Norstedts); Magnus William-Olsson, Ingersonetterna (lit. 'The Ingersonettes') (Wahlström & Widstrand)
2011	Tomas Bannerhed (b. 1966)	Korparna (lit. 'The Ravens')	Weyler förlag	Bengt Ohlsson, Rekviem för John Cummings (lit. 'Requiem for John Cummings') (Albert Bonniers Förlag); Carolina Fredriksson, Flod (lit. 'River') (Albert Bonniers Förlag); Sören Bondeson, En kubikmeter jord (lit. 'One Cubic Meter of Land') (Lejd); Eva-Marie Liffner, Lacrimosa (Natur & Kultur); Amanda Svensson, Välkommen till den här världen (lit. 'Welcome to This World') (Norstedts)
2012	Göran Rosenberg (b. 1948)	Ett kort uppehåll på vägen från Auschwitz (lit. 'A Brief Stop on the Road from Auschwitz')	Albert Bonniers Förlag	Johannes Anyuru, En storm kom från paradiset (lit. 'A Storm Came from Paradise') (Norstedts); Eija Hetekivi Olsson, Ingenbarnsland (lit. 'No Child's Country') (Norstedts); Peter Fröberg Idling, Sång till den storm som ska komma (lit. 'Song for the Storm to Come') (Natur & Kultur); Cilla Naumann, Springa med åror (lit. 'Run with Oars') (Albert Bonniers Förlag); Sara Stridsberg, Medealand och andra pjäser (lit. 'Medealand and Other Plays') (Albert Bonniers Förlag)
2013	Lena Andersson (b. 1970)	Egenmäktigt förfarande – en roman om kärlek (lit. 'Arbitrary Conduct – A Novel About Love') (trans. Wilful Disregard)	Natur & Kultur	Per Olov Enquist, Liknelseboken. En kärleksroman (lit. 'The Book of Parables: A Love Novel') (Norstedts); Athena Farrokhzad, Vitsvit (Albert Bonniers Förlag); Katarina Frostenson, Tre vägar (lit. 'Three Ways') (Wahlström & Widstrand); Sven Olov Karlsson, Porslinsfasaderna (lit. 'Porcelain Facades') (Natur & Kultur); Kjell Westö, Hägring 38 (lit. 'Mirage 38') (Albert Bonniers Förlag)
2014	Kristina Sandberg (b. 1971)	Liv till varje pris (lit. 'Life at Any Cost')	Norstedts	Lyra Ekström Lindbäck, Ett så starkt ljus (lit. 'Such a Strong Light') (Modernista); Sara Stridsberg, Beckomberga. Ode till min familj (lit. 'Beckomberga. Ode to My Family') (Albert Bonniers Förlag); Carl-Michael Edenborg, Alkemistens dotter (lit. 'The Alchemist's Daughter') (Natur & Kultur); Ida Börjel, Ma (Albert Bonniers Förlag); Steve Sem-Sandberg, De utvalda (lit. 'The Chosen') (Albert Bonniers Förlag)
2015	Jonas Hassen Khemiri (b. 1978)	Allt jag inte minns (lit. 'Everything I Don't Remember')	Albert Bonniers Förlag	Aris Fioretos, Mary (Norstedts); Carola Hansson, Masja (lit. 'Masha') (Albert Bonniers Förlag); John Ajvide Lindqvist, Rörelsen. Den andra platsen (lit. 'Movement. The Second Place') (Ordfront); Agneta Pleijel, Spådomen. En flickas memoarer (lit. 'The Prediction: A Girl's Memoir') (Norstedts); Stina Stoor, Bli som folk (lit. 'Become Like People') (Norstedts)
2016	Lina Wolff (b. 1973)	De polyglotta älskarna (lit. 'The Polyglot Lovers')	Albert Bonniers Förlag	Therese Bohman, Aftonland (Norstedts); Ann Jäderlund, Djupa kärlek ingen (lit. 'Deep Love No One') (Albert Bonniers Förlag); Linda Boström Knausgård, Välkommen till Amerika (lit. 'Welcome to America') (Modernista); Lars Norén, En dramatikers dagbok 2013–2015 (lit. 'A Playwright's Diary, 2013–2015') (Albert Bonniers Förlag); Andrzej Tichý, Eländet (lit. 'The Misery') (Albert Bonniers Förlag)
2017	Johannes Anyuru (b. 1979)	De kommer att drunkna i sina mödrars tårar (Note: "With an original and fate-saturated dramaturgy, Johannes Anyuru depicts the chain of events where the fabric of society in a contemporary and future Sweden breaks down and leaves open to terror and repression. With poetic delay, the individual vulnerability is embodied in a world with shrinking life prospects and a provocative wonder about the effect of human actions..") (lit. 'They Will Drown in their Mothers' Tears')	Norstedts	Sigrid Combüchen, Sidonie & Nathalie. Från Limhamn till Lofoten (lit. 'Sidonie & Nathalie. From Limhamn to Lofoten') (Norstedts); Jörgen Gassilewski, Hastigheten (lit. 'The Speed') (Albert Bonniers Förlag); Isabelle Ståhl, Just nu är jag här (lit. 'Right Now I'm Here') (Natur & Kultur); Jenny Tunedal, Rosor skador (lit. 'Damaged Roses') (Wahlström & Widstrand); Klas Östergren, I en skog av sumak (lit. 'In a Forest of Sumac') (Natur & Kultur)
2018	Linnea Axelsson (b. 1980)	Ædnan (Note: "In Linnea Axelsson's poetic fragments, another side of the emerging twentieth century is depicted. The loss of the Sami aednan's rhythm of life is captured in two family stories where generations' repressed belonging to language and nature has left existential tears.") (lit. 'Earth')	Albert Bonniers förlag	Ulf Eriksson, Skalornas förråd (lit. 'The Shed of Scales') (Albert Bonniers förlag); Kenneth Hermele, En shtetl i Stockholm (lit. 'A Shtetl in Stockholm') (Weyler förlag); Björn Runeborg, Socialdemokratiska noveller (lit. 'Social Democratic Short Stories') (Modernista); Sami Said, Människan är den vackraste staden (lit. 'Humankind is the Most Beautiful City') (Natur & Kultur); Karin Smirnoff, Jag for ner till bror (lit. 'I Went Down to My Brother') (Bokförlaget Polaris)
2019	Marit Kapla (b. 1970)	Osebol (Note: "With unfailing feeling and respect, Marit Kapla creates an entire universe of her literary reportage about Osebol. Individuals' testimonies become lyrical songs where different voices are interspersed. The talk about the place reflects both painful change and uncertain future. The fate of sparsely populated areas and the world is shaped by life in a Värmland village.")	Teg Publishing	Anna Fock, Väderfenomen (lit. 'Weather Phenomena') (Natur & Kultur); Daniel Gustafsson, Odenplan (Nirstedt/litteratur); Steve Sem-Sandberg, W (Albert Bonniers Förlag); Nina Wähä, Testamente (lit. 'Testament') (Norstedts); Olivia Bergdahl, Barnet. En sonettkrans (lit. 'The Child. A Sonnet Wreath') (Ordfront)
2020	Lydia Sandgren (b. 1987)	Samlade verk (Note: "Lydia Sandgren builds and populates her own literary universe filled with living details. Gothenburg, with black clubs, sunkhak and university libraries, becomes the scene of a triangle drama where the missing Cecilia is the black hole around which the novel characters gravitate. Collected works are a declaration of love for literature.") (lit. 'Collected Works')	Albert Bonniers Förlag	Carola Hansson, Minnestrådar (lit. 'Memory Threads') (Albert Bonniers Förlag); Stefan Lindberg, Splendor (Albert Bonniers Förlag); Annika Norlin, Jag ser allt du gör (lit. 'I See Everything You Do') (Weyler förlag); Thomas Tidholm, Jordlöparens bok. Om natur, konst och människor (lit. The Runner's Book: About Nature, Art and People) (Ordfront förlag); Klas Östergren, Renegater (lit. 'Renegades') (Polaris)
2021	Elin Cullhed (b. 1983)	Eufori: en roman om Sylvia Plath (Note: "In her literary imagination, Elin Cullhed lets the reader get really close to the creative, living person Sylvia Plath. Life-affirming and furious prose depicts how a poetic genius wrestles with a housewife existence where dreams and desperation give birth to each other. With Euphoria, an author icon takes its place in our time – in the beating heart of the text, the reader also sees himself.") (lit. Euphoria: A Novel about Sylvia Plath)	Wahlström & Widstrand	Maxim Grigoriev, Europa (Albert Bonniers Förlag); Mats Jonsson, När vi var samer (lit. 'When We Were Sami') (Galago); Kjell Espmark, Återliv: med Skapelsen och Kvällens frihet (lit. 'Resuscitation: With Creation and Freedom of the Evening') (Norstedts); Balsam Karam, Singulariteten (lit. 'The Singularity') (Norstedts); Ellen Mattson Den svarta månens år (lit. 'The Year of the Black Moon') (Albert Bonniers Förlag)
2022	Ia Genberg (b. 1967)	Detaljerna (Note: "In Detaljerna, an incandescent fever becomes a portal to the past and the relationships that once meant everything – in a life that no longer exists. With melancholy, precision and low-key humor, Ia Genberg writes the shards that create a human being, and lets her voice sound with unmistakable timbre. In the precise feeling for the small details, a whole world comes alive.") (trans. The Details Wildfire Books, London: 2023)	Weyler Förlag	Johannes Anyuru, Ixelles (Norstedts); Anneli Jordahl, Björnjägarens döttrar (lit. The Bear Hunter's Daughters) (Norstedts); Iman Mohammed, Minnen av infraröd (lit. Memories of infrared) (Norstedts); Jenny Tunedal, Dröm, baby, dröm (lit. Dream, baby, dream) (Wahlström & Widstrand); Lina Wolff, Djävulsgreppet (lit. Devil's grip) (Albert Bonniers Förlag)
2023	Andrev Walden (b. 1976)	Jävla karlar (Note: "In a perfect balance between light-heartedness and sadness, Andrev Walden depicts a boy's attempt to grasp an existence where fathers are constantly being replaced. Jävla karlar is a humorous confrontation with a different childhood, which, despite the blackness throughout, is portrayed with an inexhaustible warmth and presence.") (lit. Bloody men)	Bokförlaget Polaris	Lena Andersson, Studie i mänskligt beteende (lit. Study in human behavior) (Bokförlaget Polaris); Lyra Ekström Lindbäck, Moral (Modernista); Pär Hansson, Spindelbjörken (lit. The Spider birch) (Norstedts); Jonas Hassen Khemiri, Systrarna (lit. The Sisters) (Albert Bonniers Förlag); Sami Said, Satansviskningar (lit. Satanic whispers) (Natur & Kultur)
2024	Tony Samuelsson (b. 1961)	Kungen av Nostratien (lit. The King of Nostratia)	Wahlström & Widstrand	Linus Gårdfeldt, Brorsan, Krabban och Lädret (Albert Bonniers förlag); Agri Ismaïl, Hyper (Albert Bonniers förlag); Hanna Rajs, Samma, Mamma (Albert Bonniers förlag); Karolina Ramqvist, Den första boken (Albert Bonniers förlag); Mirja Unge, Hundnätter (Norstedts)
2025	Lina Wolff (b. 1973)	Liken vi begravde (lit. The bodies we buried)	Albert Bonniers Förlag	Kristian Fredén, En inre angelägenhet (lit. An internal matter) (Ordfront förlag); Isabella Nilsson, Tomhet och ömhet (lit. Emptiness and tenderness) (Ellerströms förlag); Lydia Sandgren, Artens överlevnad (lit. Survival of the species) (Albert Bonniers Förlag); Linda Spåman, Ett år av apokalyptiskt tänkande (lit. A year of apocalyptic thinking) (Galago); Mikael Yvesand, Våran pojke (lit. Our boy) (Bokförlaget Polaris)

=== Non-fiction ===
Year	Winner	Work		Shortlisted nominees
1992	Gunnar Broberg (b. 1942)	Gyllene äpplen (lit. 'Golden Apples')	Atlantis	Lotte Möller, Trädgårdens natur (lit. 'The Nature of the Garden') (Albert Bonniers Förlag); Jan Ling & Erik Kjellberg, Klingande Sverige (lit. 'Sounding Sweden') (Wahlström & Widstrand); Sverker Sörlin, Naturkontraktet (lit. 'The Nature Contract') (Carlssons Bokförlag); Wilhelm Forsling & Ingemar Bergström, I Demokritos fotspår (lit. 'In the Footsteps of Democritus') (Natur & Kultur); Lennart Stenberg & Bo Mossberg, Den nordiska floran (lit. 'The Nordic Flora') (Wahlström & Widstrand)
1993	Peter Englund (b. 1957)	Ofredsår (lit. 'The Year of Unrest')	Atlantis	Peter Nilson, Solvindar (lit. 'Solar Winds') (Norstedts); Michael Nordberg, Renässansmänniskan (lit. 'The Renaissance Man') (Tidens Förlag); Stig Holmqvist & Lasse Berg, I Sven Hedins spår (lit. 'In Sven Hedin's Footsteps') (Carlssons Bokförlag); Clarence Crafoord, Barndomens återkomst (lit. 'The Return of Childhood') (Natur & Kultur); Marie-Christine Skuncke, Gustaf III – det offentliga barnet (lit. 'Gustaf III – The Public Child') (Bokförlaget Atlantis)
1994	Leif Jonsson (b. 1933)	Musiken i Sverige I–IV (lit. 'Music in Sweden I-IV')	Fischer & Co	Ingmar Karlsson, Islam och Europa (lit. 'Islam and Europe') (Wahlström & Widstrand); Göran Willis, Katarina Juvander & Staffan Bengtsson, Med k-märkt genom Sverige (lit. 'With the K-mark Through Sweden') (Byggförlaget); Maria-Pia Boëthius, Makt och ärlighet (lit. 'Power and Honesty') (Albert Bonniers Förlag); Karin Johannisson, Den mörka kontinenten (lit. 'The Dark Continent') (Norstedts); Hans Henrik Brummer, Anders Zorn (Norstedts)
1995	Maria Flinck (b. 1954)	Tusen år i trädgården. Från sörmländska herrgårdar och bakgårdar (lit. 'A Thousand Years in the Garden: From Sörmland Manors and Backyards')	Tiden	Aud Talle & Stig Holmqvist, Barheidas fjärde hustru. Antropologisk reseberättelse (lit. 'Barheida's Fourth Wife. Anthropological Travelogue') (Carlssons Bokförlag); Henrik Ekman & Gunnar Brusewitz, Ekoparken (lit. 'Ecoparks') (Wahlström & Widstrand); Eva Österberg, Folk förr. Historiska essäer (lit. 'The People Before. Historical Essays') (Bokförlaget Atlantis); Niklas Bodell, Bo Lidén & Leif Kasvi, Estonia. Berättelsen om en tragedi (lit. Estonia. The Story of a Tragedy) (Albert Bonniers förlag); Anders Ehnmark, Resa i skuggan (lit. 'Travel in the Shadows') (Norstedts)
1996	Maja Hagerman (b. 1960)	Spåren av kungens män (lit. 'Traces of the King's Men')	Prisma	Göran Rosenberg, Det förlorade landet (lit. 'The Lost Land') (Albert Bonniers Förlag); Ronny Ambjörnsson, Mitt förnamn är Ronny (lit. 'My First Name Is Ronny') (Albert Bonniers Förlag); Martin Tjernberg & Richard Fredriksson, Upplands fåglar – fåglar, människor och landskap genom 300 år (lit. 'Uppland's birds – birds, people and landscapes over 300 years') (Upplands Ornitologiska Förening); Astrid Trotzig, Blod är tjockare än vatten (lit. 'Blood Is Thicker Than Water') (Albert Bonniers Förlag); Peter Englund, Brev från nollpunkten (lit. 'Letter from Ground Zero') (Albert Bonniers Förlag)
1997	Sven-Eric Liedman (b. 1939)	I skuggan av framtiden (lit. 'In the Shadow of the Future')	Bonnier Alba	Mattias Tydén & Ingvar Svanberg, Sverige och förintelsen (lit. 'Sweden and the Holocaust') (Bokförlaget Arena); Per Christian Jersild, Darwins ofullbordade (lit. 'Darwin's Unfinished') (Albert Bonniers Förlag); Lotte Möller, Citron (lit. 'Lemon') (Albert Bonniers Förlag); Per Svensson, Storstugan – eller när förorten kom till byn (lit. 'The Big House – or When the Suburb Came to the Village') (Albert Bonniers Förlag); Karin Johannisson, Kroppens tunna skal (lit. 'The Thin Shell of the Body') (Norstedts)
1998	Bengt Jangfeldt (b. 1948)	Svenska vägar till S:t Petersburg (lit. 'Swedish Roads to St. Petersburg')	Wahlström & Widstrand	Birgitta Holm, Sara – i liv och text (lit. 'Sara – In Life and Text') (Albert Bonniers Förlag); Nils Uddenberg, Arvsdygden (lit. 'The Virtue of Inheritance') (Natur & Kultur); Svante Nordin, Filosofernas krig (lit. 'The War of the Philosophers') (Bokförlaget Nya Doxa); Carmilla Floyd, Respekt (lit. 'Respect') (Bokförlaget DN); Eva Lis Bjurman, Catrines intressanta blekhet (lit. 'Catherine's Interesting Pallor') (Brutus Östlings Bokförlag Symposion)
1999	Jan Svartvik (1931–2024)	Engelska – öspråk, världsspråk, trendspråk (lit. 'English – Island Language, World Language, Trend Language')	Norstedts	Bim Clinell, De hunsades revansch (lit. 'The Revenge of the Merciless') (Bokförlaget DN); Eva Öhrström, Elfrida Andrée (Bokförlaget Prisma); Johan Svedjedal, Skrivaredans (lit. 'Printer Dance') (Wahlström & Widstrand); Monika Björk, Florans konstnärer (lit. 'Flora's Artists') (Bokförlaget Prisma); Dick Harrison, I skuggan av Cathay (lit. 'In the Shadow of Cathay') (Historiska Media)
2000	Dick Harrison (b. 1966)	Stora döden (lit. 'Great Death')	Ordfront Förlag	Peter Englund, Den oövervinnerlige (lit. 'The Invincible') (Bokförlaget Atlantis); Johan Cullberg, Psykoser (lit. 'Psychoses') (Natur & Kultur); Staffan Ulfstrand, Savannliv (lit. 'Savannah Life') (Carlssons Bokförlag); Camilla Lundberg, Musikens myter (lit. 'The Myths of Music') (Wahlström & Widstrand); Dominic Ingemark, Henrik Gerding & Martine Castoriano, Liv och död i antikens rom (lit. 'Life and Death in Ancient Rome') (Historiska Media)
2001	Hans Hammarskjöld (1925–2012), Anita Theorell (b. 1941), & Per Wästberg (b. 1933)	Minnets stigar (lit. 'The Ladder of Memory')	Max Ström	Yukiko Duke & Eiko Duke, Mikaku, den japanska kokboken (lit. 'Mikaku, The Japanese Cookbook') (Wahlström & Widstrand); Staffan Ulfstrand, Flugsnapparnas vita fläckar (lit. 'The White Spots of the Flycatchers') (Bokförlaget Atlantis); Sven-Eric Liedman, Ett oändligt äventyr (lit. 'An Endless Adventure') (Albert Bonniers Förlag); Fredric Bedoire, Guldålder (lit. 'Golden Age') (Albert Bonniers Förlag); Eva Helen Ulvros, Sophie Elkan (Historiska Media)
2002	Lars-Olof Larsson (1934–2020)	Gustav Vasa – landsfader eller tyrann? (lit. 'Gustav Vasa – Father of the Country or Tyrant?')	Prisma	Vivi Edström, Selma Lagerlöf. Livets vågspel (lit. 'Selma Lagerlöf. The Gamble of Life') (Natur & Kultur); Maaret Koskinen, I begynnelsen var ordet. Ingmar Bergman och han tidiga författarskap (lit. 'In the Beginning Was the Word. Ingmar Bergman and His Early Writings') (Wahlström & Widstrand); Nathan Shachar, Till jaguarernas land. Essäer om regnskog, politik och människor i Latinamerika (lit. 'To the Land of the Jaguars. Essays on Rainforests, Politics and People in Latin America') (Bokförlaget Atlantis); Katarina Wennstam, Flickan och skulden. En bok om samhällets syn på våldtäkt (lit. 'The Girl and the Guilt. A Book about Society's Views on Rape') (Albert Bonniers Förlag); Ingela Broström, Tradition i trä. En resa genom Sverige (lit. 'Tradition in Wood. A Journey through Sweden') (Byggförlaget)
2003	Nils Uddenberg (b. 1934)	Idéer om livet (lit. 'Ideas About Life')	Natur & Kultur	Helene Schmitz & Jessica Clayton, Blow Up (Natur & Kultur); Eva Adolfsson, Hör, jag talar! Essäer om litteraturens skäl (lit. Listen, I'm Talking! Essays on the Reasons for Literature) (Albert Bonniers Förlag); Per Gedin, Litteraturens örtagårdsmästare. Karl Otto Bonnier och hans tid (lit. 'The Herb Garden Master of Literature. Karl Otto Bonnier and His Time') (Albert Bonniers Förlag); Lena Katarina Swanberg, Blod svett och tårar (lit. 'Blood, Sweat and Tears') (Bokförlaget DN); Bengt Jangfeldt, En osalig ande. Berättelsen om Axel Munthe (lit. 'An Unhappy Spirit. The Story of Axel Munthe') (Wahlström & Widstrand)
2004	Sverker Sörlin (b. 1956)	Europas idéhistoria 1492–1918: Världens ordning och Mörkret i människan (lit. 'History of Europe's Ideas 1492–1918:The Order of the World and the Darkness in Man')	Natur & Kultur	Elisabet Stavenow-Hidemark, Lars Lööv & Ingela Broström, Tapetboken (lit. 'The Wallpaper Book') (Byggförlaget); Fredrik Sjöberg, Flugfällan (lit. 'The Fly Trap') (Bokförlaget Nya Doxa); Torsten Ekbom, Den osynliga domstolen. En bok av Frans Kafka (lit. 'The Invisible Court. A Book by Franz Kafka') (Natur & Kultur); Lena Israelsson, Cityodling (lit. 'City Cultivation') (Albert Bonniers Förlag); Ulrika Knutson, Kvinnor på gränsen till genombrott (lit. 'Women on the Verge of Breakthrough') (Albert Bonniers Förlag)
2005	Lena Einhorn (b. 1954)	Ninas resa (lit. 'Nina's Journey')	Prisma	Thomas von Vegesack, Stockholm 1851 (Norstedts); Nina Burton, Den nya kvinnostaden (lit. 'The New Women's City') (Albert Bonniers Förlag); Hugo Lagercrantz, I barnets hjärna (lit. 'In the Child's Brain') (Albert Bonniers Förlag); Magnus Linton, Americanos (Bokförlaget Atlas); Martin Holmér, Karl Jilg, Nils Ryrholm, Claes U. Eliasson & Ulf Gärdenfors, Nationalnyckeln till Sveriges flora och fauna – fjärilar (lit. 'The National Key to Sweden's Flora and Fauna – Butterflies') (Artdatabanken SLU)
2006	Cecilia Lindqvist (b. 1932)	Qin	Albert Bonniers Förlag	Ola Wikander, I döda språks sällskap (lit. 'In the Company of Dead Languages') (Wahlström & Widstrand); Sven-Eric Liedman, Stenarna i själen (lit. 'The Stones in the Soul') (Albert Bonniers Förlag); Brutus Östling & Susanne Åkesson, Pingvinliv (lit. 'Penguin Life') (Norstedts); Sigrid Combüchen, Livsklättraren. En bok om Knut Hamsun (lit. 'The Life Chamber. A Book about Knut Hamsun') (Albert Bonniers Förlag); Pär Holmgren & Bernes Claes, Meteorologernas väderbok (lit. 'Meteorologist's Weather Book') (Medströms Bokförlag)
2007	Bengt Jangfeldt (b. 1948)	Med livet som insats (lit. 'With Life at Stake')	Wahlström & Widstrand	Ola Larsmo, Djävulssonaten (lit. 'The Devil's Sonata') (Albert Bonniers Förlag); Kerstin Ekman, Herrarna i skogen (lit. 'The Gentlemen in the Forest') (Albert Bonniers Förlag); Susanna Scherman, Den svenska kakelugnen (lit. 'The Swedish Tile Stove') (Wahlström & Widstrand); Staffan Ulfstrand, Fågelliv (lit. 'Bird Life') (Ellerström); Hans Lagerberg, Lärarna (lit. 'The Teachers') (Ordfront förlag)
2008	Paul Duncan (b. 1964) & Bengt Wanselius (b. 1944)	Regi Bergman (lit. 'Directed by Bergman')	Max Ström	Lena Israelsson, Klosterträdgårdar (lit. 'Monastery Gardens') (Wahlström & Widstrand); Lisbeth Larsson, Hennes döda kropp. Victoria Benedictssons arkiv och författarskap (lit. 'Her Dead Body. Victoria Benedictsson's Archive and Authorship') (Weyler Förlag); Zac O'Yeah, Mahatma! Eller konsten att vända världen upp och ner (lit. 'Mahatma! Or the Art of Turning the World Upside Down') (Ordfront förlag); Kjell Östberg, I takt med tiden. Olof Palme 1927–1969 (lit. 'In Step with the Times. Olof Palme 1927–1969') (Leopard Förlag); Ingrid Carlberg, Pillret (lit. 'The Pill') (Norstedts)
2009	Brutus Östling (b. 1958) & Susanne Åkesson (b. 1964)	Att överleva dagen (lit. 'To Survive the Day')	Symposion	Karin Johannisson, Melankoliska rum (lit. 'Melancholic Rooms') (Albert Bonniers Förlag); Johan Svedjedal, Frihetens rena sak (lit. 'The Pure Thing of Freedom') (Wahlström & Widstrand); Laila Reppen, Lars Nordling & Cecilia Björk, Så byggdes villan – Svensk villaarkitektur från 1890 till 2010 (lit. 'This is How the Villa Was Made – Swedish Villa Architecture from 1890 to 2010') (Forskningsrådet Formas); Lena Sundström, Världens lyckligaste folk (lit. 'The Happiest People in the World') (Leopard Förlag); Elisabeth Åsbrink, Smärtpunkten (lit. 'The Pain Point') (Natur & Kultur)
2010	Yvonne Hirdman (b. 1943)	Den röda grevinnan (lit. 'The Red Countess')	Ordfront förlag	Henrik Ekman, Vargen – den jagade jägaren (lit. 'The Wolf – The Hunted Hunter') (Norstedts); Magnus Linton, Cocaina. En bok om dom som gör det (lit. 'Cocaine. A Book about Those Who Do It') (Bokförlaget Atlas); Tina Thunander, Resa i Sharialand. Ett reportage om kvinnors liv i Saudiarabien (lit. 'Travel in Sharialand. A Report on Women's Lives in Saudi Arabia') (Leopard Förlag); Kristoffer Leandoer, Mask – litteraturen som gömställe (lit. 'Mask – Literature as a Hiding Place') (Pequod Press); Moa Matthis, Maria Eleonora. Drottningen som sa nej (lit. 'Maria Eleonora. The Queen Who Said No') (Albert Bonniers Förlag)
2011	Elisabeth Åsbrink (b. 1965)	Och i Wienerwald står träden kvar (lit. 'And in Wienerwald the Trees Remain')	Natur & Kultur	Lennart Pehrson, Ni har klockorna – vi har tiden. USA tio år efter 11 september (lit. 'You Have the Clocks – We Have the Time. United States Ten Years After 9/11') (Albert Bonniers Förlag); Johan Svedjedal, Spektrum. Den svenska drömmen. Tidskrift och förlag i 1930-talets kultur (lit. 'Spectrum. The Swedish dream. Magazine and Publisher in 1930s Culture') (Wahlström & Widstrand); Lasse Berg, Skymningssång i Kalahari. Hur människan bytte tillvaro (lit. 'Twilight Song in the Kalahari. How Humans Changed Life') (Ordfront förlag); Christel Kvant, Trädets tid (lit. 'The Time of the Tree') (Norstedts); Magnus Bärtås & Fredrik Ekman, Alla monster måste dö. Gruppresa till Nordkorea: Ett reportage (lit. 'All Monsters Must Gie. Group Trip to North Korea: A Report') (Albert Bonniers Förlag)
2012	Ingrid Carlberg (b. 1961)	Det står ett rum här och väntar på dig – Berättelsen om Raoul Wallenberg (lit. 'There's a Room Waiting for You – The Story of Raoul Wallenberg')	Norstedts	Monica Lauritzen, Sanningens vägar. Anne Charlotte Lefflers liv och dikt (lit. 'The Ways of Truth. Anne Charlotte Leffler's Life and Poems') (Albert Bonniers Förlag); Katrine Kielos, Det enda könet. Varför du är förförd av den ekonomiske mannen och hur det förstör ditt liv och världsekonomin (lit. 'The Only Gender. Why You Are Seduced by the Economic Man and How it Destroys Your Life and the World Economy') (Albert Bonniers Förlag); James Dobreff, Arne Jönsson, & Helene Schmitz, Ur regnskogens skugga. Daniel Rolander och resan till Surinam (lit. 'From the shadow of the rainforest. Daniel Rolander and the trip to Suriname') (Bokförlaget Max Ström); Martin Gelin, Den amerikanska högern. Republikanernas revolution och USA:s framtid (lit. 'The American Right. The Republican Revolution and the Future of the United States') (Natur & Kultur); Zlatan Ibrahimović & David Lagercrantz, Jag är Zlatan Ibrahimovic. Min historia (lit. 'I am Zlatan Ibrahimović. My story') (Albert Bonniers Förlag)
2013	Bea Uusma (b. 1966)	Expeditionen. Min kärlekshistoria (lit. 'The Expedition. My Love Story') (trans. The Expedition: The Forgotten Story of a Polar Tragedy)	Norstedts	Tore Janson, Germanerna (lit. 'The Germanic People') (Norstedts); Lena Sundström, Spår (lit. 'Track') (Natur & Kultur); Johan Persson & Martin Schibbye, 438 dagar (lit. '438 Days') (Offside Press); Gustav Mandelmann & Marie Mandelmann, Självhushållning på Djupadal (lit. 'Subsistence Farming at Djupadal') (Bonnier Fakta); Dan Josefsson, Mannen som slutade ljuga (lit. 'The Man Who Stopped Lying') (Lind & Co)
2014	Lars Lerin (b. 1954)	Naturlära (lit. 'Natural Science')	Bonniers	Per Wästerberg, Erik och Margot. En kärlekshistoria (lit. 'Erik and Margot. A Love Story') (Wahlström & Widstrand); Håkan Håkansson, Vid tidens ände. Om stormaktstidens vidunderliga drömvärld och en profet vid dess yttersta rand (lit. 'At the End of Time. About the Wonderful Dream World of the Great Power era and a Prophet at its Outer Edge') (Medströms Bokförlag); Tina Thunander, Doktor Nasser har ingen bil. Kairo i omvälvningens tid (lit. 'Dr. Nasser Has No Car. Cairo in the Time of Upheaval') (Leopard Förlag); Anders Rydell, Plundrarna. Hur nazisterna stal Europas konstskatter (lit. 'The Looters. How the Nazis Stole Europe's Art Treasures') (Ordfront förlag); Anna Charlotta Gunnarson, Popmusik rimmar på politik (lit. 'Pop Music Rhymes with Politics') (Bokförlaget Atlas)
2015	Karin Bojs (b. 1959)	Min europeiska familj. De senaste 54 000 åren (lit. 'My European Family. The Last 54,000 Years')	Albert Bonniers Förlag	Karin Johannisson, Den sårade divan (lit. 'The Wounded Diva') (Albert Bonniers Förlag); Johan Hilton, Monster i garderoben. En bok om Anthony Perkins och tiden som skapade Norman Bates (lit. 'Monsters in the Wardrobe. A Book about Anthony Perkins and the Time that Created Norman Bates') (Natur & Kultur); Lennart Pehrson, Den nya staden. Utvandringen till Amerika II (lit. 'The New City. Emigration to America II') (Albert Bonniers Förlag); Maja Hagerman, Käraste Herman. Rasbiologen Herman Lundborgs gåta (lit. 'Dearest Herman. The Race Biologist Herman Lundborg's Mystery') (Norstedts); Magnus Linton, Knark. En svensk historia (lit. 'Dope. A Swedish History') (Bokförlaget Atlas)
2016	Nina Burton (b. 1946)	Gutenberggalaxens nova. En essäberättelse om Erasmus av Rotterdam, humanismen och 1500-talets medierevolution (lit. 'The Gutenberg Galaxy's Nova. An essay on Erasmus of Rotterdam, Humanism and the 16th-century Media Revolution')	Albert Bonniers Förlag	Elisabeth Åsbrink, 1947 (Natur & Kultur); Niklas Orrenius, Skotten i Köpenhamn. Ett reportage om Lars Vilks, extremism och yttrandefrihetens gränser (lit. 'The Shots in Copenhagen. A Report on Lars Vilks, Extremism and the Limits of Freedom of Expression') (Albert Bonniers Förlag); Ulf Karl Olov Nilsson, Glömskans bibliotek. En essä om demens, vansinne och litteratur (lit. 'The Library of Oblivion. An Essay on Dementia, Insanity and Literature') (Norstedts); Charlotta von Zweigbergk, Fattigfällan (lit. 'The Poverty Trap') (Ordfront förlag); Felix Heintzenberg & Ole Jørgen Liodden, Arktis. Liv i en värld av is och snö (lit. 'The Arctic. Life in a World of Ice and Snow') (Bio & Fokus Förlag)
2017	Fatima Bremmer (b. 1977)	Ett jävla solsken: En biografi om Ester Blenda Nordström (lit. 'Fucking Sunshine: A Biography of Ester Blenda Nordström')	Forum	Hédi Fried, Frågor jag fått om Förintelsen (lit. 'Questions I Received about the Holocaust') (Natur & Kultur); Sven Olov Karlsson, Brandvakten (lit. 'Firefighters') (Natur & Kultur); Roine Magnusson, Mats Ottosson, & Åsa Ottosson, Nära fåglar (lit. 'Near Birds') (Bonnier Fakta); Johan Svedjedal, Den nya dagen gryr. Karin Boyes författarliv (lit. 'The New Day Dawns. Karin Boye's Life as an Author') (Wahlström & Widstrand); Per Wirtén, Är vi framme snart? Drömmen om Europas förenta stater, (lit. 'Are We There Soon? The Dream of the United States of Europe') (Albert Bonniers Förlag)
2018	Magnus Västerbro (b. 1971)	Svälten. Hungeråren som formade Sverige (lit. 'Famine: The Years of Hunger that Shaped Sweden')	Albert Bonniers förlag	Kerstin Ekman, Gubbas hage (lit. 'Gubba's Garden') (Albert Bonniers förlag); Martin Gelin & Karin Pettersson, Internet är trasigt. Silicon Valley och demokratins kris (lit. 'The Internet Is Broken. Silicon Valley and the Crisis of Democracy') (Natur & Kultur); Jens Liljestrand, Mannen i skogen. En biografi över Vilhelm Moberg (lit. 'The Man in the Woods. A Biography of Vilhelm Moberg') (Albert Bonniers förlag); Alexandra Pascalidou, Mammorna (lit. 'The Mothers') (Bokförlaget Atlas); Lars Tunbjörk, Maud Nycander, Göran Odbratt & Kathy Ryan, Lars Tunbjörk. Retrospektiv (lit. 'Lars Tunbjörk. Retrospective') (Bokförlaget Max Ström)
2019	Patrik Svensson (b. 1972)	Ålevangeliet. Berättelsen om världens mest gåtfulla fisk (Note: "A dizzying story with philosophical and existential signs about the extinction of the endangered eel and its place among humans and myths that take the reader out into deep water, both literally and figuratively. Patrik Svensson lets us follow the eel from the Sargasso Sea, via a smorgasbord right into his soul where, thanks to his father, it has been given a very special place. Because it is also a story about a father and son, and how the love for the eel tied them together in an often wordless relationship.") (trans. The Book of Eels: Our Enduring Fascination with the Most Mysterious Creature in the Natural World (Ecco Press))	Albert Bonniers förlag	Alexandra Borg & Nina Ulmaja, Strindbergs lilla röda. Boken om boken och typerna (lit. 'Strindberg's Little Red. The Book about the Book and the Types') (Atlantis); Ingrid Carlberg, Nobel. Den gåtfulle Alfred, hans värld och hans pris (lit. 'Nobel. The Enigmatic Alfred, His World and His Prize') (Norstedts); Peter Handberg, Världens yttersta platser. Judiska spår (lit. 'The Outermost Places in the World. Jewish Traces') (Bokförlaget Faethon); Lotte Möller, Bin och människor. Om bin och biskötare i religion, revolution och evolution samt många andra bisaker (lit. 'Bees and Humans. About Bees and Beekeepers in Religion, Revolution and Evolution and Many Other Side Effects') (Norstedts); Anna-Karin Palm, Jag vill sätta världen i rörelse. En biografi över Selma Lagerlöf (lit. 'I Want To Set the World in Motion. A Biography of Selma Lagerlöf') (Albert Bonniers förlag)
2020	Elin Anna Labba (b. 1980)	Herrarna satte oss hit. Om tvångsförflyttningarna i Sverige (Note: "Elin Anna Labba describes reindeer skins as "so soft that it feels like the hand should melt when you iron them". With the same quiet poetic power in the language, she makes visible Sweden's forced relocations of the Sami, forced relocations that have divided ancient family ties, networks and relocation routes. By also weaving in testimonials, archive photographs, maps, yoiks and government papers, she sheds new light on a dark part of Sweden's history in this very beautifully designed book.") (trans. The Rocks Will Echo Our Sorrow: The Forced Displacement of the Northern Sámi (University of Minnesota Press))	Norstedts	Nina Burton, Livets tunna väggar (lit. 'The Thin Walls of Life') (Albert Bonniers förlag); Johanna Bäckström Lerneby, Familjen (lit. 'The Family') (Mondial); Kristoffer Leandoer, Längta hem, längta bort. En essä om litteratur på flykt (lit. 'Longing for Home, Longing Away. An Essay on Literature on the Run') (Natur & Kultur); Jan Malmborg, Trubbel. Berättelsen om Olle Adolphson (lit. 'Trouble. The Story of Olle Adolphson') (Albert Bonniers förlag); Arash Sanari, Sverigevänner. Historien om hur pappa och jag försökte bli svenskast på Tjörn (lit. 'Sweden Friends. The Story of How Dad and I Tried to be the Most Swedish on Tjörn') (Volante)
2021	Nils Håkanson (b. 1975)	Dolda gudar – en bok om allt som inte går förlorat i en översättning (Note: "Fyodor Dostoevsky, Jane Austen, Karl Marx and Toni Morrison all have in common that they have been translated from other languages into Swedish. It also has Harlequin books and the Bible. In Hidden Gods, Nils Håkanson takes us on a dizzying tour of the translation landscape and puts the translator at the center. With finesse, humor and an infectious interest in language and style, he shows how the view of translation and the role of the translator has changed throughout history, but that one thing is constant – translation is an indispensable part of the text's path to the reader, purely its own form of literature.") (lit. 'Hidden Gods. A Book about Everything that is not Lost in a Translation')	Norstedts	Sara Martinsson, Knäböj (lit. 'Squat') (Weyler Förlag); Carl Henrik Carlsson, Judarnas historia i Sverige (lit. 'History of the Jews in Sweden') (Natur & Kultur); Anders Cullhed, Dante: Den förste författaren (lit. 'Dante: The First Author') (Natur & Kultur); Anneli Rogeman, Mönstersamhället (lit. 'The Model Society' (Natur & Kultur)
2022	Nina van den Brink (b. 1966)	Jag har torkat nog många golv (Note: "Maja Ekelöf, a cleaning lady and single mother of five, made a name for herself with her 1970 diary Rapport från en skurhink ("Report from a Scrub Bucket"). Nina van den Brink skillfully weaves together Maja Ekelöf – cleaning lady, acclaimed author, abortion advocate, and left-wing activist – with stories of cleaning ladies in her own family. The close descriptions of each task and its effect on the body are almost poetic. The book is as much a powerful portrait of one of Sweden's most poignant writers as it is a reckoning with the welfare state that did not benefit everyone.") (lit. I have wiped enough floors)	Norstedts	Hans Gunnar Axberger, Statsministermordet (lit. The Prime Minister's assassination)(); Claes Britton, Pontus Hultén; Andreas Cervenka, Girig-Sverige (lit. Greedy Sweden); Maja Larsson, Kläda blodig skjorta (lit. Wear Bloody Shirt); Amat Levin, Svart historia (lit. Black History)
2023	Per Svensson (b. 1956)	Zorn (Note: "There is much more to Anders Zorn than the myth of his valley hills and eternal space. In Per Svensson's biography, we get a full portrait of the miracle painter and modern entrepreneur with his outstanding ability to network in the right circles, charge money, and look ahead. But neither his art nor his health could withstand so much success and so much partying. Per Svensson paints a nuanced picture, placing the world-renowned artist's life in time and space, depicting the road to fame and the end when Zorn's artistic drive was consumed.")	Albert Bonniers förlag	Henrik Berggren, Landet utanför Sverige och kriget 1943–1945 (lit. The country outside Sweden and the war 1943–1945) (Norstedts); Eva Ekselius, Vakna, mitt folk! Det judiska Europa mellan den franska revolutionen och den ryska (lit. Wake up, my people! Jewish Europe between the French Revolution and the Russian Revolution) (Volante); Knut Kainz Rognerud, Sundsvallsoligarken: En berättelse om hur Ryssland lurade väst (lit. The Sundsvall oligarch: A story about how Russia tricked the West) (Mondial); Anna Lihammer and Ted Hesselbom, Vikingatider: När världen öppnades (lit. Viking times: When the world opened up) (Historiska Media); Lisa dos Santos, Älskade bror: En rapport från gängvåldets Sverige (lit. Beloved Brother: A report from gang violence in Sweden) (Bokförlaget Forum)
2024	Christian Rück (b. 1971)	Ett liv värt att leva (lit. A life worth living)	Albert Bonniers Förlag	Bonnie Clementsson, Fängslade öden (lit. Imprisoned Fates) (Historiska Media); Kaj Fölster, Bosse Lindquist, Janken Myrdal, De hemliga breven (lit. The secret letters) (Albert Bonniers Förlag); Kim Khavar Fahlsted, Oland (lit. Oland) (Appell Förlag); Richard Tellström, Varje tugga är en tanke. (lit. Every bite is a thought.) (Natur & Kultur); Tora Wall, Skogen (lit. The forest) (Bokförlaget Stolpe)
2025	Bea Uusma (b. 1966)	Vitön.	Norstedts	Göran Greider, Stinas bästa vän (lit. Stina's best friend) (Ordfront förlag); Robin Olovsson, Historien om Norrland (lit. The history of Norrland) (Volante); Fredrik Sjöberg, Bruno Liljefors (lit. Bruno Liljefors) (Albert Bonniers Förlag); Lena Sohl, Tvätten (lit. The laundry) (Natur & Kultur); Patrik Svensson, Den barmhärtige mördaren (lit. The Merciful Killer) (Albert Bonniers Förlag)

=== Children and Young Adult ===
Year	English literal translation	Original Swedish title	Author	Publisher
1992	I Miss You, I Miss You!	Jag saknar dig, jag saknar dig!	Peter Pohl & Kinna Gieth	Rabén & Sjögren
1993	Vinterviken	Vinterviken	Mats Wahl	Bonnier Carlsen
1994	The Master and the Four Printers	Mästaren och de fyra skrivarna	Ulf Nilsson	Natur & Kultur
1995	The Girl Who Did Not Want to Kiss	Flickan som inte ville kyssas	Rose Lagercrantz	Brombergs
1996	My Sister is an Angel	Min syster är en ängel	Ulf Stark & Anna Höglund	Alfabeta Bokförlag
1997	Truth or Dare	Sanning eller konsekvens	Annika Thor	Bonnier Carlsen
1998	The Journey to the End of the World	Resan till världens ände	Henning Mankell	Rabén & Sjögren
1999	Plays Dead	Spelar död	Stefan Casta	Opal
2000	Gittan and the Gray Wolves	Gittan och gråvargarna	Pija Lindenbaum	Rabén & Sjögren
2001	Are U 4 Real?	Sandor slash Ida	Sara Kadefors	Bonnier Carlsen
2002	Goodbye, Mr. Muffin	Adjö, herr Muffin	Ulf Nilsson & Anna-Clara Tidholm	Bonnier Carlsen
2003	In the Ceiling the Stars Are Shining	I taket lyser stjärnorna	Johanna Thydell	Natur & Kultur
2004	Is Elias Dancing? No!	Dansar Elias? Nej!	Katarina Kieri	Rabén & Sjögren
2005	Eddie Bolander & I	Eddie Bolander & jag	Bo R. Holmberg & Katarina Strömgård	Rabén & Sjögren
2006	Svenne	Svenne	Per Nilsson	Rabén & Sjögren
2007	Where's My Sister?	Var är min syster?	Sven Nordqvist	Opal
2008	The Legend of Sally Jones	Legenden om Sally Jones	Jakob Wegelius	Bonnier Carlsen
2009	Write Again and Again	Skriv om och om igen	Ylva Karlsson, Katarina Kuick, Sara Lundberg & Lilian Bäckman	X Publishing
2010	Me On the Floor, Bleeding	Här ligger jag och blöder	Jenny Jägerfeld	Gilla Böcker
2011	The Boys	Pojkarna	Jessica Schiefauer	Bonnier Carlsen
2012	ABC and All Dat	ABC å allt om D	Nina Ulmaja	Bonnier Carlsen
2013	The String, The Bird and Me	Snöret, fågeln och jag	Ellen Karlsson & Eva Lindström	Hippo bokförlag
2014	The Murderer's Ape	Mördarens apa	Jakob Wegelius	Bonnier Carlsen
2015	When the Dogs Come	När hundarna kommer	Jessica Schiefauer	Bonnier Carlsen
2016	Ten Past One	Tio över ett	Ann-Helén Laestadius	Rabén & Sjögren
2017	The Bird in Me Flies Wherever It Wants	Fågeln i mig flyger vart den vill	Sara Lundberg	Mirando Bok
2018	The Pit	Gropen	Emma Adbåge	Mirando Bok
2019	Wait for the Wind	Vänta på vind	Oskar Kroon	Brombergs
2020	Humlan Hansson's Secrets	Humlan Hanssons hemligheter	Kristina Sigunsdotter & Ester Eriksson	Hippo bokförlag
2021	The Night Raven	Nattkorpen	Johan Rundberg	Natur & Kultur
2022	We're Just Going to Cycle Past	Vi ska ju bara cykla förbi	Ellen Strömberg	Rabén & Sjögren and Schildts & Söderströms
2023	Wood anemones and piss rats	Vitsippa och pissråttor	Oskar Kroon & Hanna Klinthage	Rabén & Sjögren
2024	Chop Chop: A brave farmer's story	Chop Chop: En tapper jordbos berättelse	Linda Bondestam	Förlaget M
2025	City of Raccoons	Tvättbjörnarnas stad	Fabian Goranson	Galago
