= Wikander =

Wikander is a surname and may refer to:

- David Wikander (1884–1955), Swedish musicologist, organist and composer
- Ola Wikander (born 1981), Swedish writer, translator and theologian
- Stig Wikander (1908–1983), Swedish indologist, iranologist and historian of religions
- Örjan Wikander (born 1943), Swedish classical archaeologist and ancient historian

== See also ==
- Vikander
