= Lydia Sandgren =

Swedish novelist (born 1987)

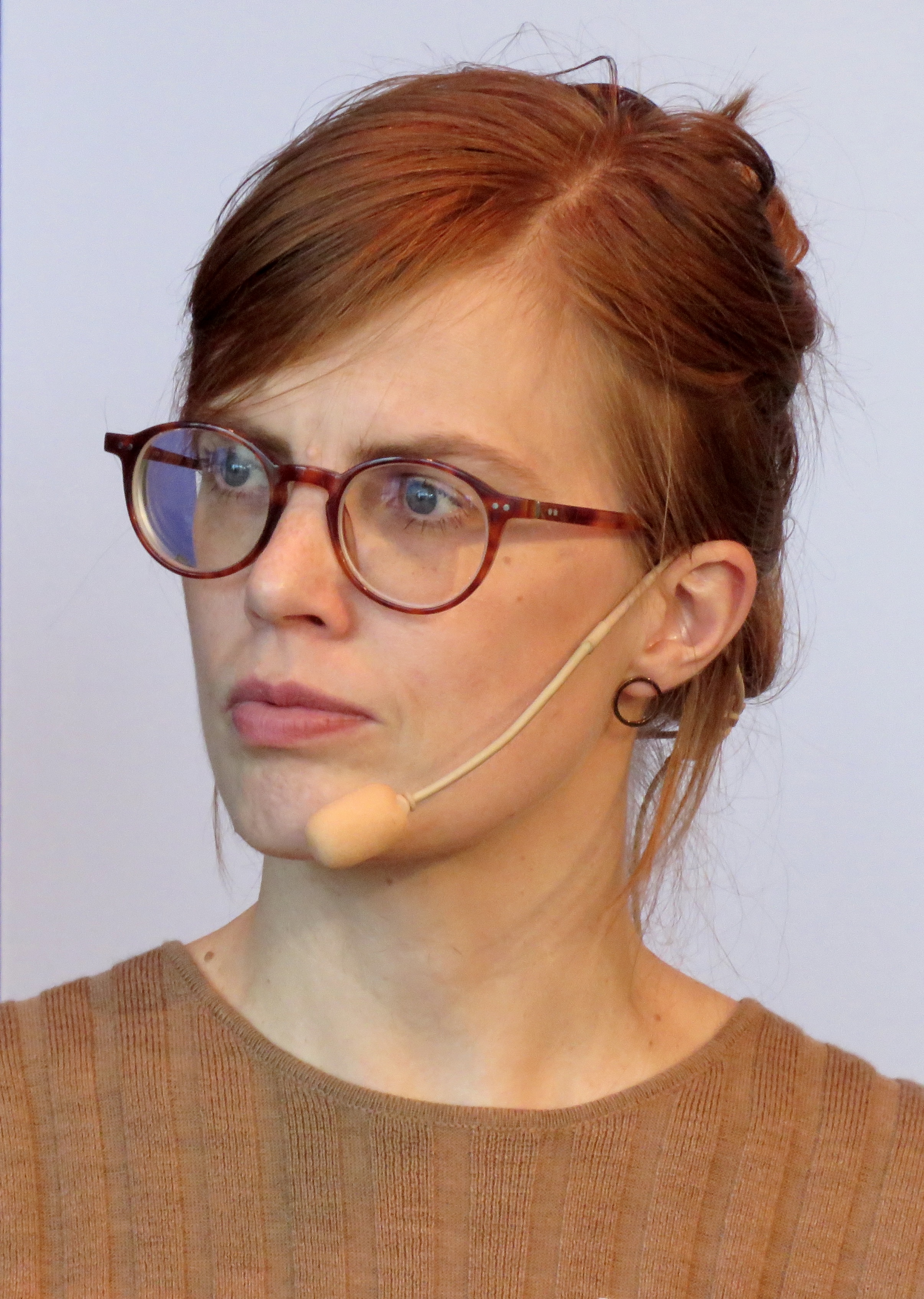
- At the Gothenburg Book Fair in 2023
- Occupation: Writer
- Awards: August Prize (2020)

Lydia Sandgren is a Swedish author, most known for her debut novel Samlade verk (2020).

== Works ==
Samlade verk, her first novel, is 700 pages long and is set in Gothenburg. It was called a "brilliant novel" by book critic Carl Michael Edenborg.

Sandgren was rewarded with the August Prize for fiction in 2020 for Samlade verk.

Her second novel, Artens överlevnad (2025) is about teacher and author Karl Hillberg, who is contacted by the widow of an Italian composer and asked to write his biography. When he accepts, he soon realises there is someone else doing the same thing at the same time - and who seems to be ahead on the project. The novel takes place in Gothenburg, Rome and New York from the 1970s and onward. Critic Sven-Anders Johansson remarked in Aftonbladet that it was a good novel yet overloaded with references and literary props.

It was nominated for the August Prize in 2025, but did not win.
