= Karin Johannisson =

Swedish idea historian

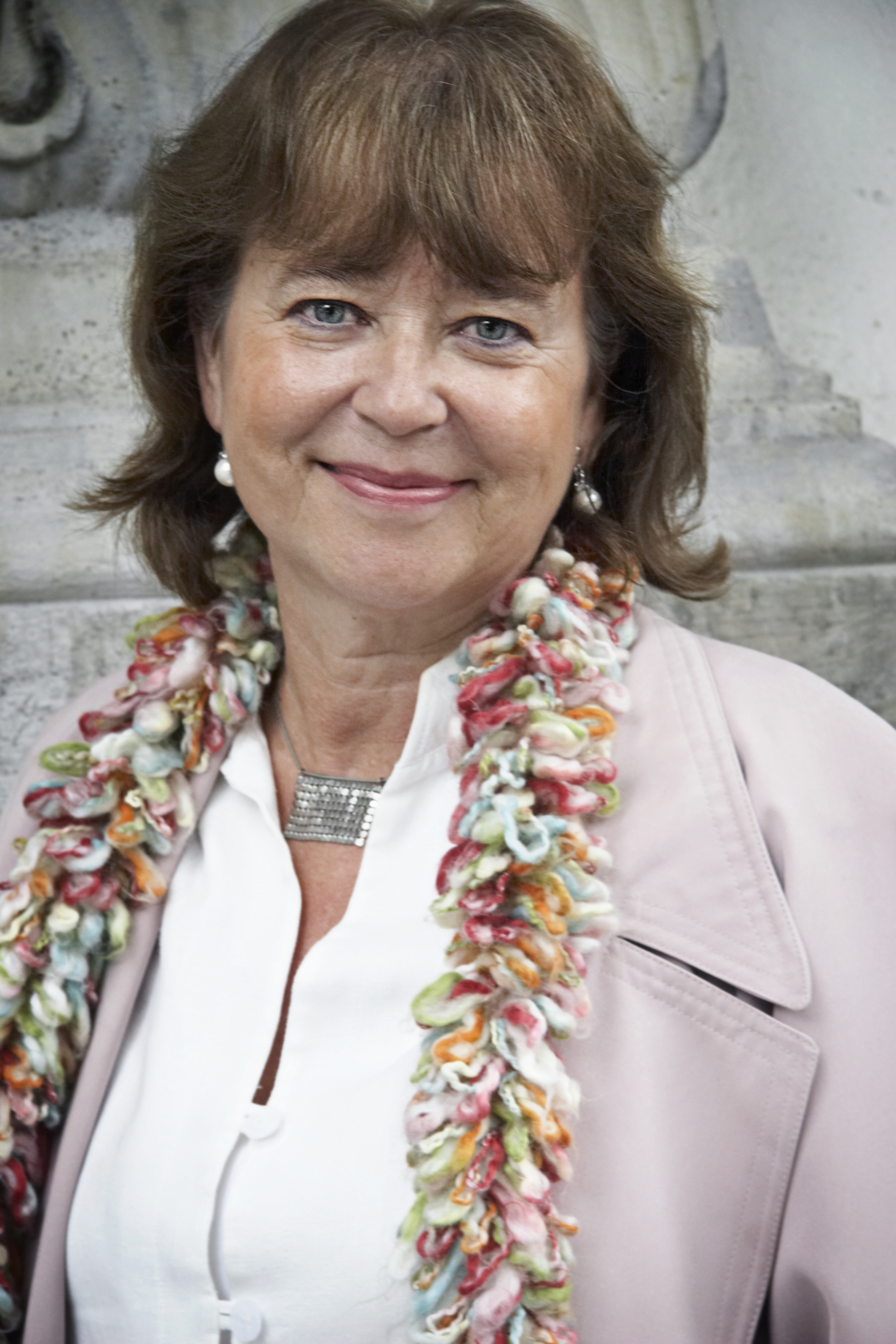
- Karin Johannisson in 2008
- Born: 11 October 1944; Gothenburg, Sweden
- Died: 23 November 2016 (aged 72); Uppsala, Sweden
- Occupations: Professor, Idea historian, Author

Karin Johannisson (11 October 1944 – November 2016) was a Swedish idea historian who was Professor of the History of Science and Ideas at Uppsala University. She was a member of the Royal Swedish Academy of Sciences.

== Early life ==
Karin Johannisson was born in Gothenburg on 11 October 1944. Her mother Lore Johannisson, née Schmidt, was a German medical student who had met and married the Swedish lecturer Tore Johannisson when he worked at the University of Marburg. The couple had three children; Karin was the youngest. They moved to Lund in 1939, and then to Gothenburg when Tore Johannisson was appointed Professor of Scandinavian languages at the University of Gothenburg.

== Career ==
Johannisson's research focused on the history of medicine from a societal perspective. Her doctoral dissertation from 1974, Magnetisörernas tid, dealt with the 18th and 19th century phenomenon called animal magnetism. She was appointed Professor of History of Science and Ideas at Uppsala University in 1996, and held the chair until her retirement in 2011.

She was also an author of popular scientific books, with 15 published titles, four of which were shortlisted for the August Prize.

In 2004, she received an honorary doctorate in medicine at Uppsala University. Johannisson was a Fellow at the Swedish Collegium for Advanced Study in Uppsala, Sweden in the Fall of 1995.

== Personal life ==
Johannisson was married twice, first to the literary scholar Stefan Mählqvist, with whom she had two sons. Her second marriage was to the mathematician Allan Gut.

Johannisson died from brain cancer in November 2016.
