= Nobel: The Enigmatic Alfred, His World and His Prize =

2019 book by Ingrid Carlberg

- First edition
- Author: Ingrid Carlberg
- Original title: Nobel. Den gåtfulle Alfred, hans värld och hans pris
- Language: Swedish
- Subject: Alfred Nobel, Nobel Prize
- Genre: biography
- Published: September 18, 2019
- Publisher: Norstedts förlag
- Publication place: Sweden
- Preceded by: Det står ett rum här och väntar på dig – Berättelsen om Raoul Wallenberg (lit. There's A Room Waiting For You - The Story of Raoul Wallenberg) (2012)

Nobel: The Enigmatic Alfred, His World and His Prize (Swedish: Nobel. Den gåtfulle Alfred, hans värld och hans pris) is a biographical book by Swedish journalist Ingrid Carlberg. It is her seventh book. It was shortlisted for the August Prize for Non-Fiction in 2019.
