= Lyra Ekström Lindbäck =

Swedish writer

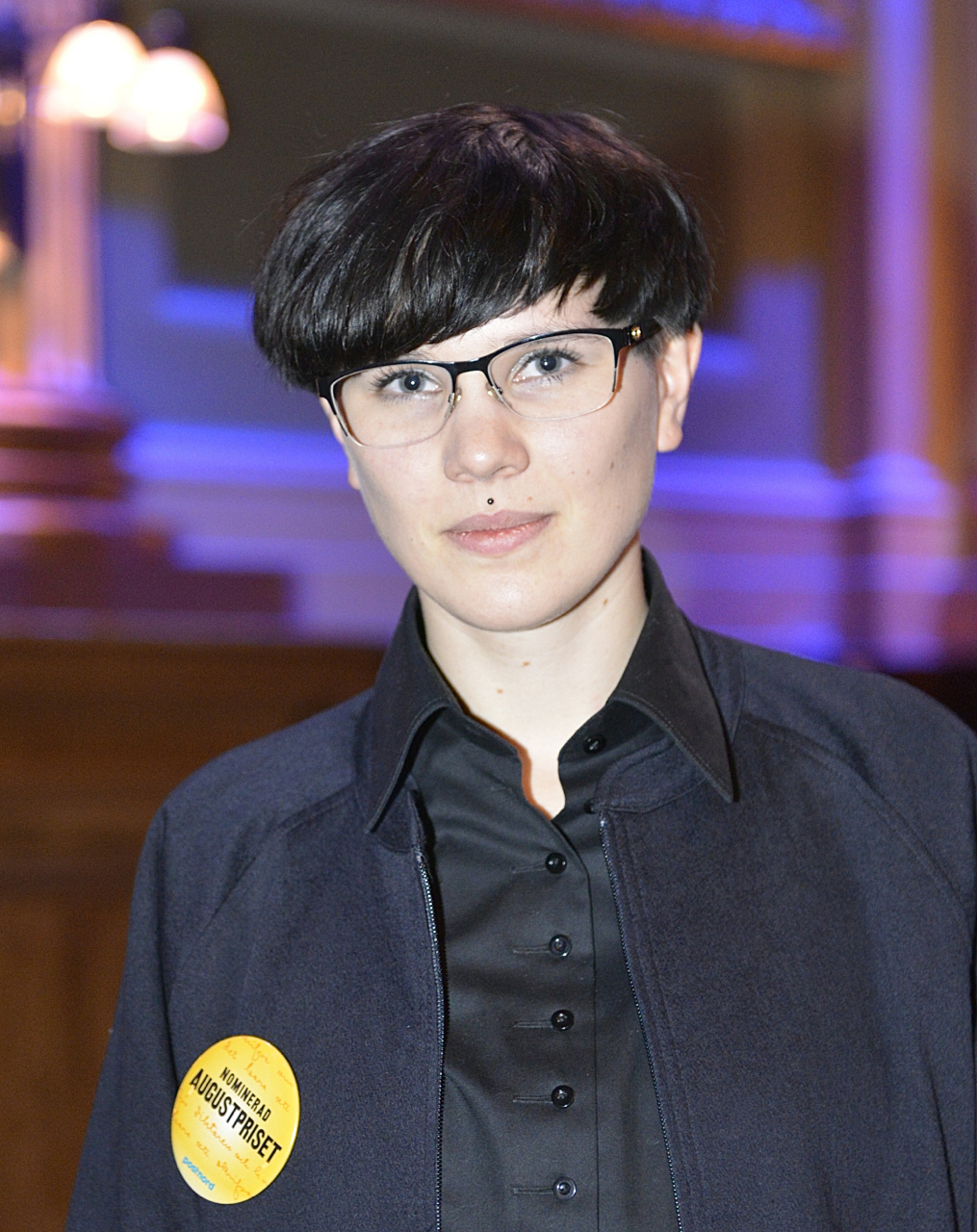
Lyra Ekström Lindbäck

Lyra Elin Josefina Ekström Lindbäck (formerly Koli) (born 14 June 1990) is a Swedish writer. She won the Young August Prize in 2008 and was nominated to the August Prize in 2014. She has published six novels, often revolving around people in search of their identities.

== Work ==
Born in Sundsvall, Lindbäck won the Young August Prize in 2008 for Manual. She published the novel Tillhör Lyra Ekström Lindbäck in 2012. The novel was followed in 2014 by Ett så starkt ljus, which was nominated for the August Prize the same year.

In 2016 she published I tiden, which revolved around the freelance writer Christoffer and his life path.

In 2019 she made her debut as a poet with Leviatan, a "playful poetic investigation of Leviathan, i.e. the sea monster evocatively described in the book of Job in the Bible."

She has also been publisher of Lesbisk Pocket and editor of the poetry magazine Fikssion.

== Awards ==
- Young August Prize, 2008
- Nominated for the August Prize, 2014

== Works ==
- 2012 – Tillhör Lyra Ekström Lindbäck (in Swedish). Modernista. ISBN 978-91-7499-143-7.
- 2014 – Ett så starkt ljus (in Swedish). Modernista. ISBN 9789174995602.
- 2016 – I tiden (in Swedish). Modernista. ISBN 9789176458501.
- 2018 – Allting växer (in Swedish). Modernista. ISBN 9789177813309.
- 2019 – Leviatan (in Swedish). Modernista. ISBN 9789177818854.
- 2020 – Blödningen (in Swedish). Modernista. ISBN 9789178934997.
