= Nina Burton =

Swedish poet and writer

Eva Ulla Nina Burton (born 5 October 1946) is a Swedish poet and essayist.

== Career ==
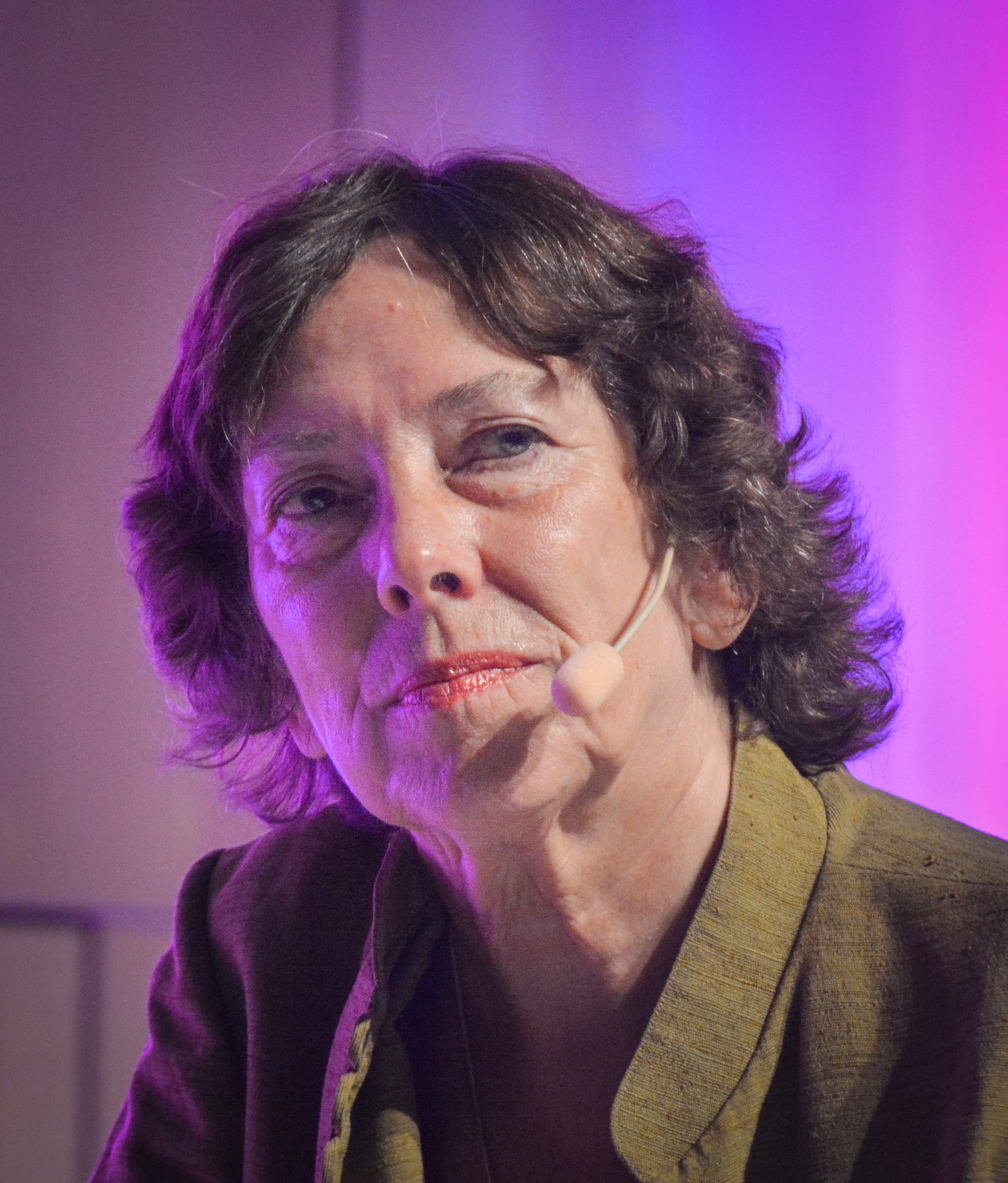
Nina Burton

Burton's writings have, among other things, focused on the intersection between natural sciences and humanities. The essay book Den nya kvinnostaden was nominated for the August Prize in 2005. Her book Flodernas bok won Stora fackbokspriset in 2012. In 2016 Burton was awarded the August Prize for non-fiction for Gutenberggalaxens nova. She was nominated to the culture prize of Dagens Nyheter in 2021 for her book Livets tunna väggar.

She has been a member of the Samfundet De Nio literary society since 1994 and a member of the Royal Swedish Academy of Sciences since 2009.

== Works ==
- 1984 – Mellan eld och skugga. Studier i den lyriska motsägelsen hos Werner Aspenström
- 1987 – Bakom den gröna dörren
- 1988 – Den hundrade poeten
- 1991 – Alkemins blå eld, tillsammans med Saleh Oweini
- 1994 – Resans syster, poesin
- 1998 – Det splittrade alfabetet
- 2000 – De röda minustalen (diktsamling)
- 2002 – Det som muser viskat
- 2005 – Den nya kvinnostaden
- 2008 – Ett svar i 24 skärvor
- 2012 – Flodernas bok
- 2016 – Gutenberggalaxens nova: En essäberättelse om Erasmus av Rotterdam, humanismen och 1500-talets medierevolution
- 2020 – Livets tunna väggar
- 2022 – Variationer på imperfekt

== Awards ==
- 2006 – Gerard Bonniers essäpris
- 2007 – Aspenströmpriset
- 2007 – Gun och Olof Engqvists stipendium
- 2007 – Letterstedtska författarpriset
- 2008 – Sorescupriset
- 2012 – Stora fackbokspriset
- 2016 – August Prize for Gutenberggalaxens nova: En essäberättelse om Erasmus av Rotterdam, humanismen och 1500-talets medierevolution
- 2017 – Svenska Akademiens essäpris
- 2020 – Övralidspriset
