= Kristina Sandberg =

Swedish novelist (born 1971)

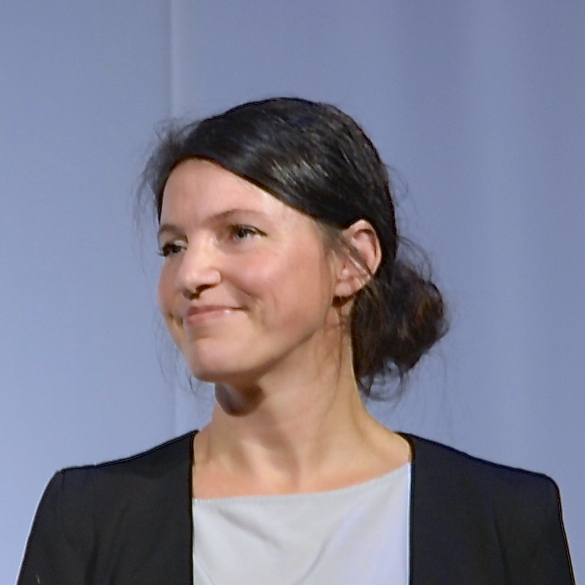
- Kristina Sandberg in 2014.
- Born: 1971 (age 54–55)
- Writing career
- Language: Swedish
- Notable awards: August Prize; 2014 Liv till varje pris

Kristina Sandberg (born 1971) is a Swedish novelist. She won the August Prize in 2014 for the novel Liv till varje pris. In 2014, she was awarded the Moa Award.

== Selected bibliography ==
- Ta itu (novel, 2010)
- Att föda ett barn (novel, 2010)
- Sörja för de sina (novel, 2012)
- Liv till varje pris (novel, 2014)
