= Susanne Åkesson =

Swedish migration expert (born 1964)

- Born: 1964 (age 61–62); Östhammar, Sweden
- Education: Uppsala University
- Scientific career
- Workplaces: Lund University

Susanne Åkesson (born 1964) is a Swedish migration expert. She is a professor of Zoology at Lund University. She was a member of the team that proposed that the stripes on zebras deter insects like tabanidae.

== Life ==
Åkesson was born in Östhammar in 1964. She is a professor of Zoology at Lund University, where she is also the Director of the Centre for Animal Movement Research (CAnMove).

In 2009 she shared the August Prize with photographer Brutus Östling for their book about the migration of birds. This was the first time the prize had been given for a non-fiction book about a natural science subject.

She has co-written research which proposes that the stripes of a zebra may deter horseflies as they find them unattractive. Along with her colleagues, she received the Ig Nobel Prize in Physics for this research in 2016. Her research about stripes on zebras has been continued. Researchers believe that the colour difference in the stripes leads also to a temperature difference which confuses the tabanidae. These insects rely on finding blood vessels which they locate based on temperature. According to 2023 research the insects learn that they cannot easily find blood vessels on striped skin and soon learn to look elsewhere.

She has worked on research showing that male Caspian terns lead their young on their first migration, transmitting cultural knowledge of migration, that several species of birds respond significantly to moonlight, and that Common swifts spend months at a time in the air without landing.

She is a fellow of the Royal Swedish Academy of Sciences.
