= The Gentlemen Put Us Here =

2020 book by Elin Anna Labba

The Gentlemen Put Us Here: About the Forced Relocations in Sweden
- First edition
- Author: Elin Anna Labba
- Original title: Herrarna satte oss hit. Om tvångsförflyttningarna i Sverige
- Language: Swedish
- Subject: Sámi people, Reindeer herding
- Genre: history
- Published: January 28, 2020
- Publisher: Norstedts förlag
- Publication place: Sweden
- Awards: August Prize (2020)
- Followed by: Hearrát dat bidje min: Bággojohtimiid birra (2020)

The Gentlemen Put Us Here: About the Forced Relocations in Sweden (Swedish: Herrarna satte oss hit. Om tvångsförflyttningarna i Sverige) is the first published book by Swedish journalist Elin Anna Labba. It won the 2020 August Prize for Non-Fiction. The full English translation of Elin's work is titled The Rocks Will Echo Our Sorrow: The Forced Displacement of the Northern Sámi.

== Plot ==
The book describes the forced displacement of Sami people that began between 1919 and 1920 after Sweden and Norway signed the Reindeer Pasture Sharing Agreement (Swedish: Renbeteskonventionen från 1919). Labba's work on the subject stems from her desire to better understand her own family history.

== Translations ==
In 2023 the book was translated into English by Fiona Graham and published by University of Minnesota Press under the title The Rocks Will Echo Our Sorrow: The Forced Displacement of the Northern Sámi. The Gentlemen Put Us Here is the literal translation of the Swedish title; however, a different name was chosen for the English translation of the work.

The same year the original was published, it was also translated into Northern Sámi under the title Hearrát dat bidje min: bággojohtimiid birra and from Swedish to Norwegian Bokmål in 2021 as Herrene sendte oss hit: om tvangsflyttingen av samene.
