= Kenneth Hermele =

Swedish economist (1948–2025)

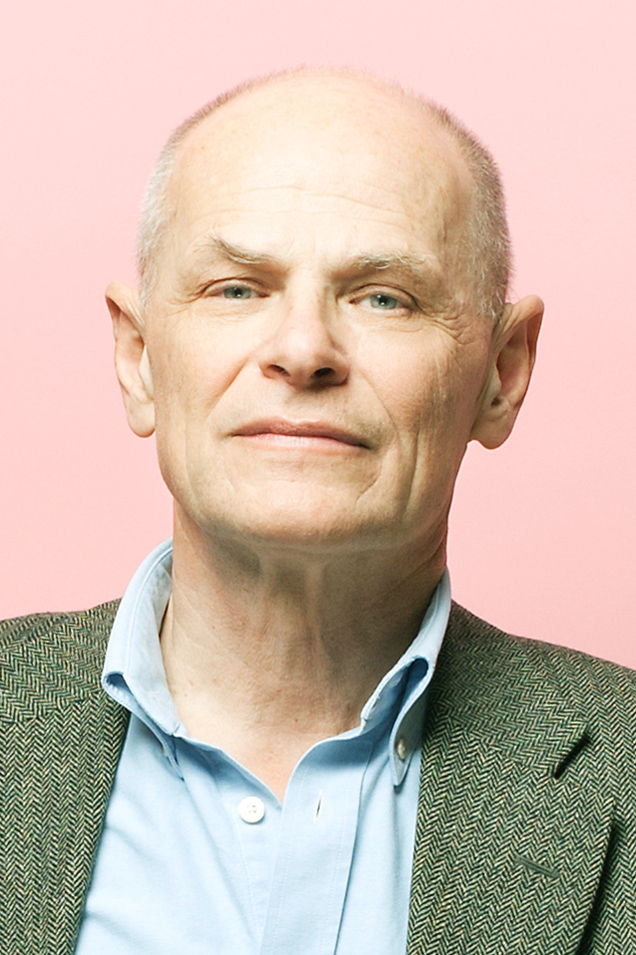
Hermele in 2014

Kenneth Zwi Hermele (26 October 1948 – 20 July 2025) was a Swedish author, economist and human ecologist.

== Life and career ==
Hermele was born 26 October 1948, to Jewish parents who fled to Sweden from Germany and Poland before World War II. He grew up in Södermalm in Stockholm in what was popularly called the "Jewish House" at Lindvallsplan 4, a house that was built with contributions from Jewish patrons to provide accommodation for Jewish refugees who came to Stockholm before the Second World War. He later described how he grew up in as a 'shtetl', a parallel society within society, and until his teenage years lived in an entirely Jewish environment. He described his upbringing in the fiction book En shtetl i Stockholm (2018). The book was nominated for the August Prize in the fiction category.

Hermele was educated at the Stockholm School of Economics. Among other things, he was an aid worker for SIDA, with three years in Mozambique in the 1980s. He taught economic development, sustainability, justice, equalization, and ecological economics at Uppsala University, Lund University, Linnaeus University in Växjö and the University of Gothenburg. He wrote a number of books on globalization, sustainability and economics.

In 2012, Hermele defended his PhD in human ecology at Lund University with the thesis "Land Matters. Agrofuel, Unequal Exchange and Appropriation of Ecological Space".

Before the 2014 parliamentary election, he ran as a parliamentary candidate for Feminist Initiative.

Hermele died on 20 July 2025, aged 76.
