= Livets ax =

1991 novel by Sven Delblanc

- First edition
- Author: Sven Delblanc
- Language: Swedish
- Published: 1991
- Publisher: Albert Bonniers förlag
- Publication place: Sweden
- Awards: August Prize of 1991

Livets ax (lit. Ear of Life) is a 1991 novel by Swedish author Sven Delblanc. It won the August Prize in 1991.
