= Fabian Göranson =

Swedish illustrator

Fabian Goranson
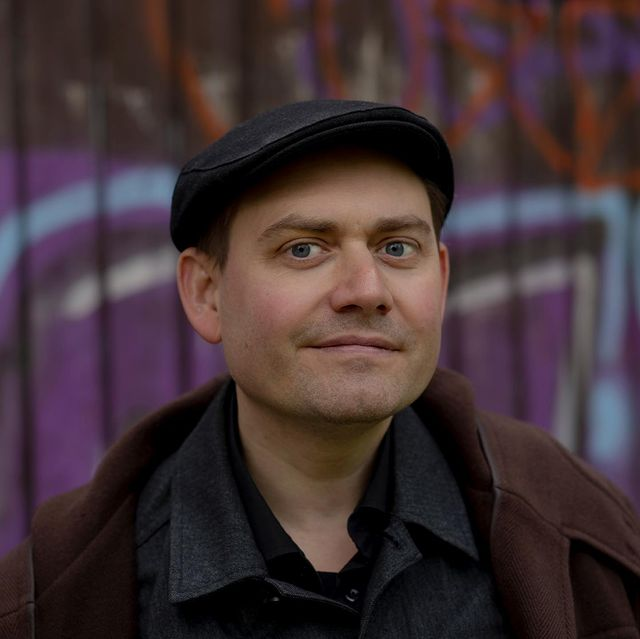
- Fabian Goranson in 2021
- Born: Fabian Göran Sixten Göranson; September 13, 1978 (age 47); Stockholm, Sweden
- Occupations: Cartoonist, writer, publisher
- Partner: My Gudmundsdotter
- Children: 2

Fabian Göranson is a Swedish illustrator and publisher of graphic novels and comics.

In 2025, he won the August Prize of the Children and Young Adult category for his Graphic novel Klara: Tvättbjörnarnas stad. His comics have been published in Swedish magazines Galago, Ordfront and Arbetaren.

== Bibliography ==
- Gaskriget (2006)
- Kirurgi (2008)
- Inferno (2010)
- Martilo och riddarna (2018)
- Drömmen om Europa (2018)
- Forntiden (2021)
- De tre paddorna (2021)
- Till skogens hjärta (2022)
- Vargarnas fest (2022)
- Vikingatiden (2022)
- Sommarens hemligheter (2023)
- Medeltiden (2023)
- Stormaktstiden (2024)
- Klara: Tvättbjörnarnas stad (2025)
- Klara: Teknokraternas plan (2026)

== Personal life ==
Fabian has two children.

Göranson's partner is Swedish improv actor My Gudmundsdotter. He currently resides in Hägersten.
