= Tecknens rike =

- First edition
- Author: Cecilia Lindqvist
- Language: Swedish
- Subject: Chinese language
- Genre: non-fiction
- Published: 1989
- Publisher: Albert Bonniers förlag
- Publication place: Sweden
- Awards: August Prize of 1989

Tecknens rike (lit. The Empire of Signs) is a 1989 book by Swedish author and sinologist Cecilia Lindqvist about the history of Chinese language writing. It won the August Prize in 1989.
