= Liv till varje pris =

2014 novel by Kristina Sandberg

- First edition
- Author: Kristina Sandberg
- Language: Swedish
- Published: 2014
- Publisher: Norstedts förlag
- Publication place: Sweden
- Awards: August Prize of 2014

Liv till varje pris (lit. Life at All Costs) is a 2014 novel by Swedish author Kristina Sandberg. It won the August Prize in 2014.
