= Yukiko Duke =

Swedish journalist

- Duke in 2026
- Born: Yukiko Anette Torun Maria Duke Bergman; 19 January 1966 (age 60); Stockholm, Sweden
- Occupations: Translator, journalist, editor and presenter

Yukiko Anette Torun Maria Duke Bergman (born 19 January 1966) is a Swedish translator, journalist, editor and presenter.

Duke is the daughter of Christer Duke and Eiko Duke-Soei, and she is a Japanese and Asian society and culture specialist. She has for several years been a journalist and news reporter for Japanese television, and in later years she has presented the shows Kvällsöppet and Röda rummet, which are broadcast on SVT. She has also been a literary critic on the SVT morning show Gomorron Sverige since 1993. She has worked as a columnist for the paper Tidningen Vi and Icakuriren for ICA. In 2011, she became an editor at the Swedish literary magazine Vi läser.

Duke has translated several Japanese books into Swedish, among them Haruki Murakami's novel Norwegian Wood. In 2001, her and Eiko Duke's book Mikaku, den japanska kokboken was nominated for the August Prize.
