= Elin Cullhed =

Swedish writer (born 1983)

Elin Cullhed (born 1983) is a Swedish writer, teacher and cultural journalist who won the August Prize for best fiction in 2021 for her book Eufori (Euphoria).

== Biography ==
Born in Uppsala, Cullhed has worked as a teacher and cultural journalist for, among other publications, Upsala Nya Tidning. She made her literary debut in 2016 with the novel Gudarna (The Gods).

Her second book Eufori (Euphoria) from 2021 is a literary fantasy over Sylvia Plath's last years. She was awarded the August Prize for best fiction in the same year. The jury cited her "life-affirming and furious prose" that depicts "how a poetic genius wrestles with her existence as a housewife where dreams and desperation breed each other."

== Works ==
- Gudarna, 2016
- Eufori, 2021

== Awards ==
- 2015 – Föreningen Arbetarskrivares litterära pris
- 2021 – August Prize for Eufori
- 2023 – Sigtunastiftelsens författarstipendium
