= Nina van den Brink =

Swedish author and journalist

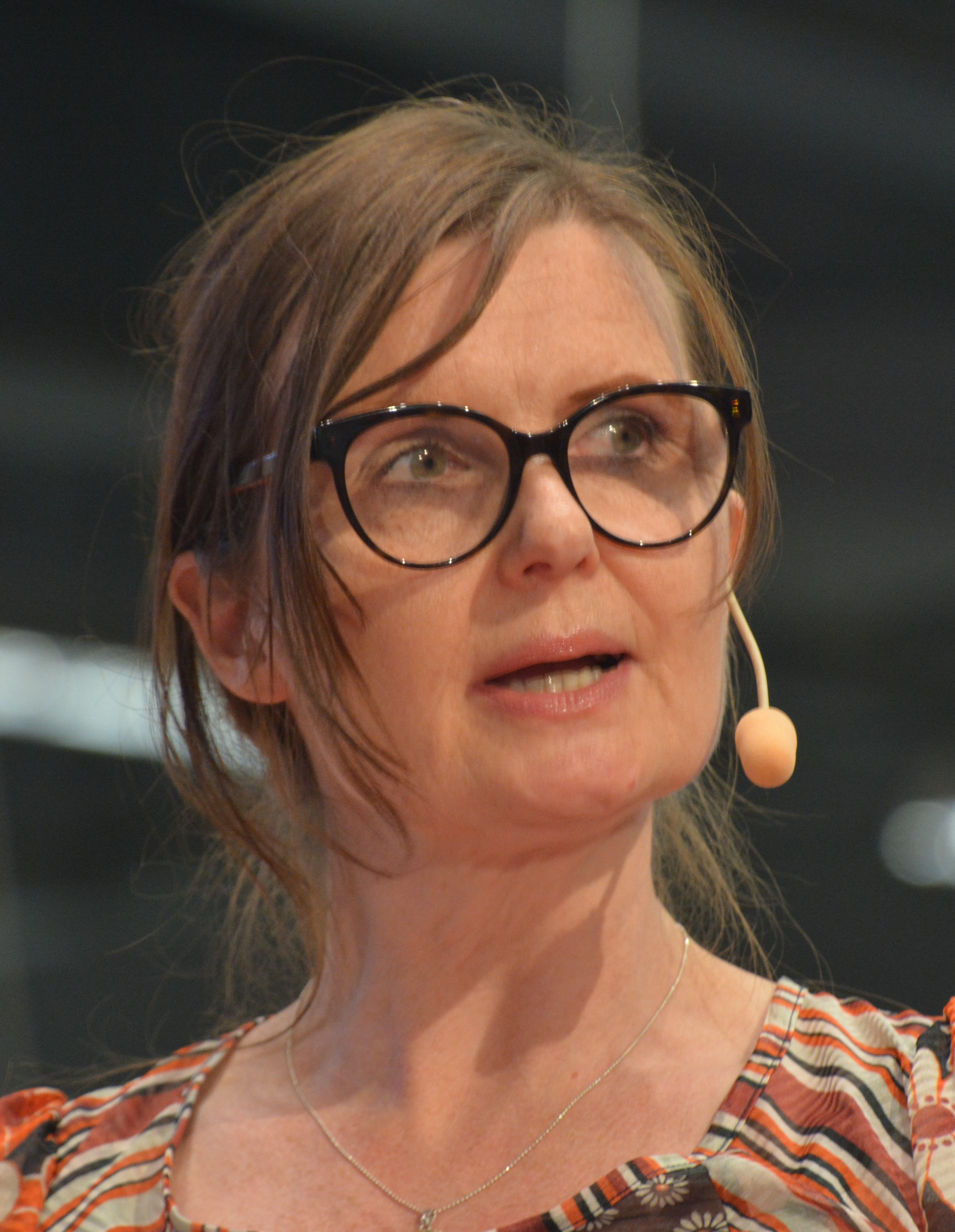
Nina van den Brink

Nina Margita van den Brink (born 6 September 1966) is a Finland-Swedish author and journalist from Sweden. She won the August Prize in 2022.

The Swedish-speaking Finn van den Brink was born in bilingual Borgå (Finnish Porvoo), Finland. She moved to Sweden with her family as a child, and she holds dual citizenship of Finland and Sweden. Van den Brink studied literature, film studies, French, economics, statistics, sociology and journalism. She has worked as a journalist with several Swedish publications including Dagens industri, Expressen, Computer Sweden, Internetworld and Situation Sthlm. Since 2016 she has worked for Fokus where she became culture editor in 2018.

In 2022, van den Brink published the book Jag har torkat nog många golv, a biography of Maja Ekelöf. Göran Greider wrote that van den Brink managed to create a rare realistic sense of presence. He believed that the biography has prospects of becoming a classic like Ekelöf's debut book "Report from a Scouring-Pale" (Swedish: Rapport från en skurhink) (1970). For the book, van den Brink was awarded the August Prize for fiction in 2022.

== Works ==
- 2022 – "Jag har torkat nog många golv": en biografi om Maja Ekelöf, Norstedts, ISBN 9789113115474
