= Daniel Sjölin =

Swedish writer and television host

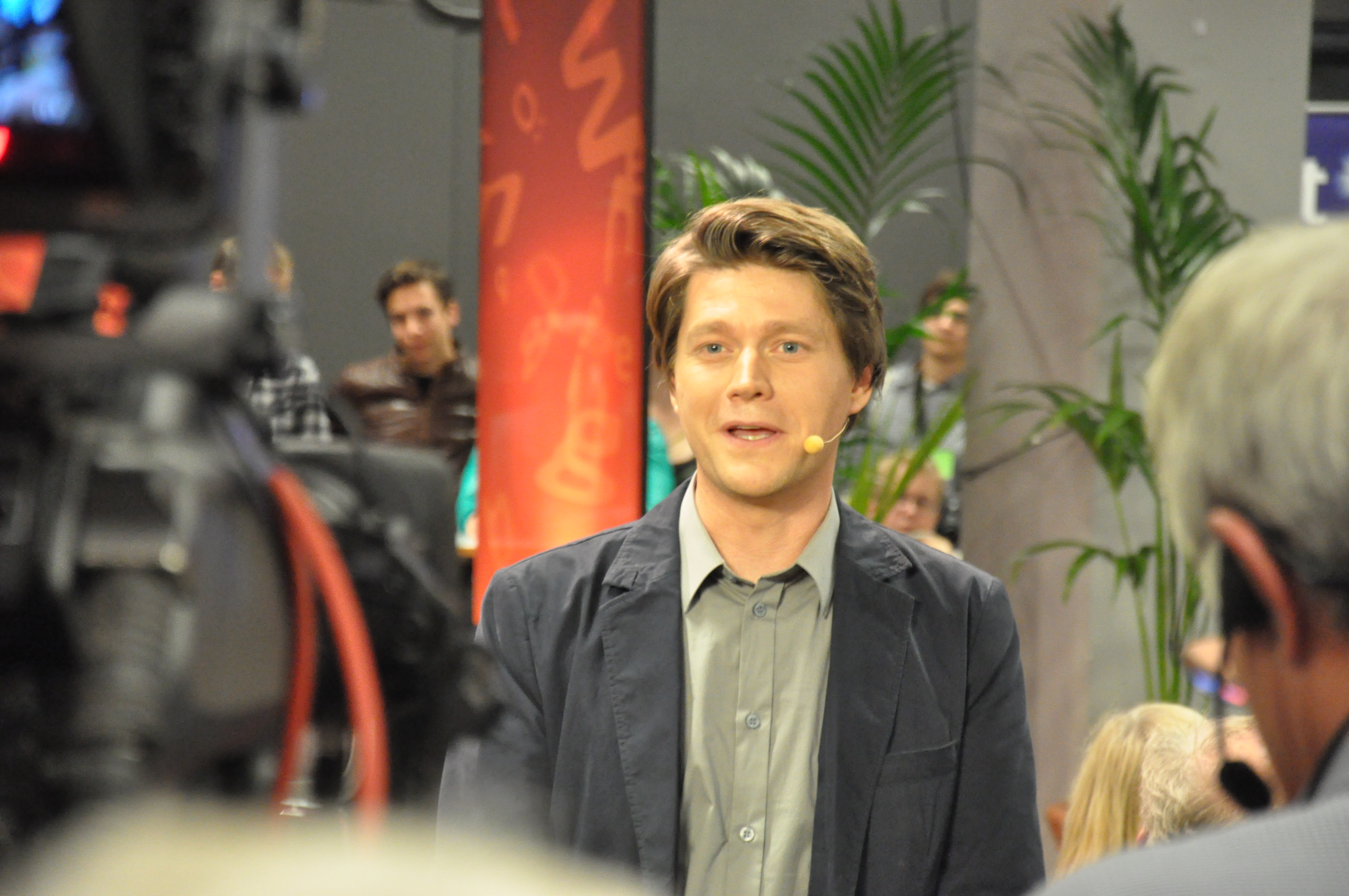
Daniel Sjölin broadcasting live from the Gothenburg Book Fair in 2011.

Daniel Sjölin (born 1977 in Bålsta, Håbo Municipality), is a Swedish novelist and television presenter.

== Bibliography ==
- Oron bror 2002
- Personliga pronomen 2004
- Världens sista roman 2007
