= Maja Hagerman =

Swedish author, journalist and filmmaker (born 1960)

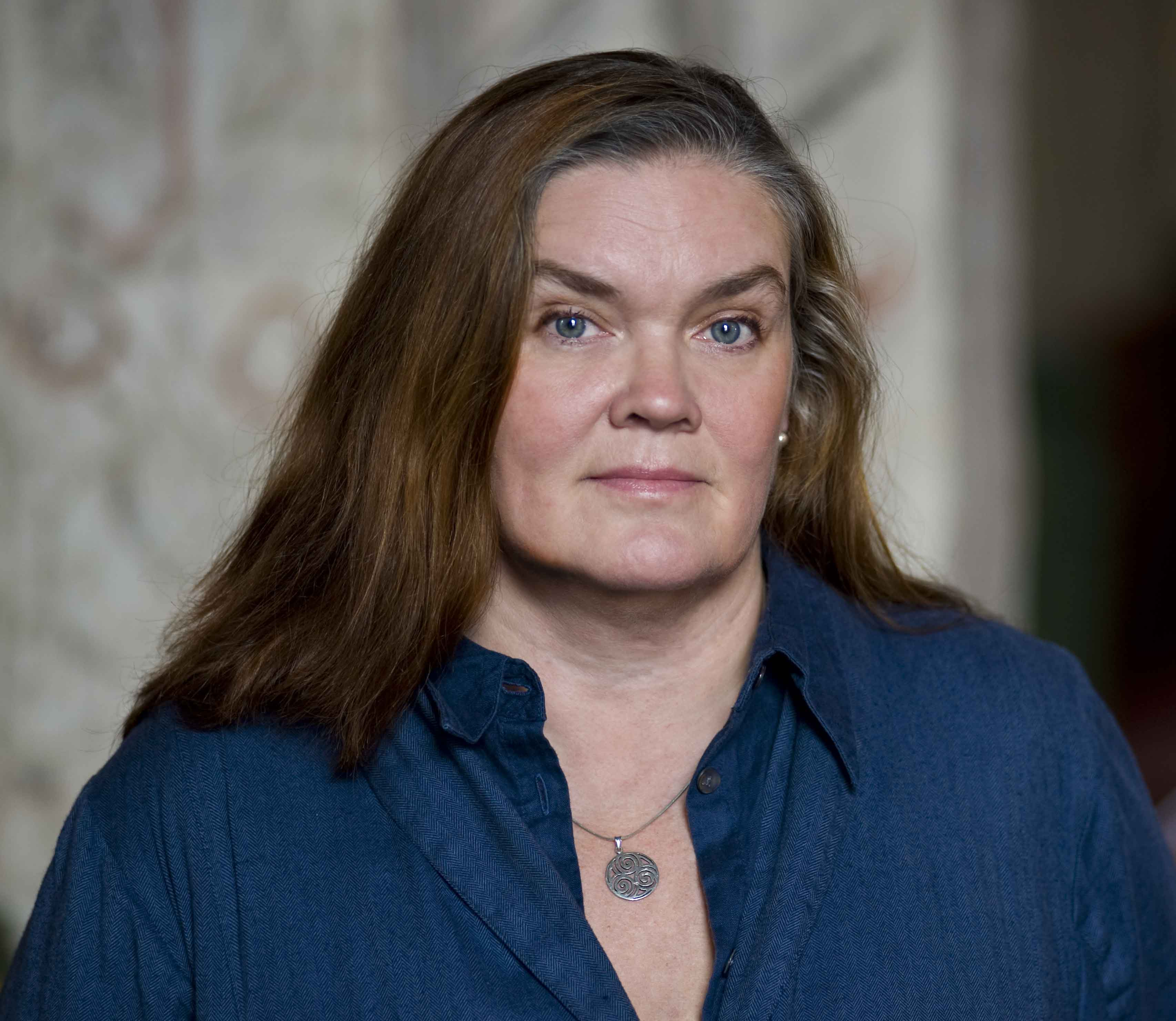
Maja Hagerman. Photo: Claes Gabrielson.

Maja Anna Maria Hagerman (born 3 February 1960) is a Swedish author, journalist and filmmaker. As senior lecturer in arts she teaches historical documentary filmmaking at Dalarna university.

Hagerman has published six books on Swedish history, early medieval and prehistoric times as well as modern history and essays on cultural heritage and memory. She has made several historical documentaries for Sveriges Television. She is an honorary doctor at the Faculty of History and Philosophy at Uppsala University, promoted in 2012.

Hagerman made her debut with the book Spåren av kungens män. Om när Sverige blev ett kristet rike, on the making of the Swedish kingdom and its conversion to Christianity. The book won the August prize for non-fiction in 1996.

In September 2015, Hagerman released the book Käraste Herman. Rasbiolog Herman Lundborgs gåta, on the physician and professor Herman Lundborg. He headed the world's first state racial biology institute in Uppsala, Sweden, from 1922 to 1935, and was internationally known for his research, especially among German-speaking supporters of racial hygiene. Like many of his German colleagues, Lundborg supported the Nazis. Lundborg was obsessed by the threat of racial mixing between Sámi, Finns and Swedes. On his travels in Northern Scandinavia, he began a relationship with a woman of Finnish-Sámi descent and eventually had a child with her.

Käraste Herman. Rasbiologen Herman Lundborgs gåta was nominated for the August prize for best non-fiction of the year in Sweden and also awarded by the Swedish Academy. It is published in German Herman Lundborg. Rätsel eines Rassenbiologen, translated by Krister Hanne.

Together with Claes Gabrielson, Hagerman made a documentary on Lundborg, Hur gör man för att rädda ett folk?, that was broadcast on Sveriges Television in January 2015. There is also an English version of the film What Measures to Save a People? A film about Herman Lundborg, head of the Swedish State Institute for Race Biology.
