= Eva-Marie Liffner =

Swedish author (born 1957)

Eva-Marie Liffner (born 1957 in Gothenburg) is a Swedish author. Her work has been awarded the Gothenburg Book Fair Award for best first-time novelist, the Swedish Academy of Crime Writers' First Book Award, The Poloni Prize, and The Flint Axe.

== Works ==
- Camera, 2001
- Imago, 2003
- Drömmaren och sorgen, 2006 (no English translation)
