= Ellen Karlsson =

Swedish footballer

Personal information
- Full name: Ellen Karlsson
- Date of birth: 3 June 1994 (age 32)
- Place of birth: Sweden
- Position: Defender

Senior career*
Years	Team	Apps	(Gls)
2011–2014	KIF Örebro	21	(0)
2015	Jitex BK	9	(0)
2016	KIF Örebro	0	(0)
2016	QBIK	12	(0)
2017	Holmalunds IF	24	(0)
2018	Västerås BK 30	12	(0)
2018–2020	KIF Örebro	55	(0)
2021	Piteå IF	18	(0)

International career^{‡}
2013	Sweden U19	3	(0)
- * Club domestic league appearances and goals as of 09:26, 26 May 2023 (UTC) ‡ National team caps and goals as of 08:52, 21 May 2016 (UTC)

Ellen Karlsson (born 3 June 1994) is a Swedish women's football defender who most recently played for Piteå IF in the 2021 Damallsvenskan.

== Honours ==
KIF Örebro DFF

Runner-up

- Damallsvenskan: 2014
