= Anders Ehnmark =

Swedish author and journalist (1931–2019)

- Born: 2 June 1931; Linköping, Sweden
- Died: 29 March 2019 (aged 87)
- Occupations: author, journalist

Anders Jacob Ehnmark (2 June 1931 – 29 March 2019) was a Swedish author and journalist.

== Biography ==
Ehnmark was born in Linköping, Östergötland County, Sweden. He earned a B.A. from Uppsala University in 1960, and an honorary doctorate from University of Gothenburg in 1993. From 1956 to 1972, he was employed by the Swedish newspaper Expressen and was its independent columnist starting in 1995. In the early 1970s, Ehnmark was employed at the Swedish communist newspaper Norrskensflamman. He was also employed at the journal Folket i Bild/Kulturfront. Around 1980, he became a member of the Left Party – Communists.

Ehnmark died on March 29, 2019. He was married to journalist Annika Hagström from 1976 until his death.

== Bibliography ==
- Angola (1962)
- Cuba cubana (1963)
- Guerrilla (1968)
- Rapport från det röda Emilien (1969)
- Exemplet Guinea-Bissau (1973)
- Jag är jävligt optimistisk (1973)
- Tusen fasta viljor (1974)
- Karamellkoket (1976)
- Chez nous (1976, co-author: Per Olov Enquist)
- Mannen på trottoaren (1979)
- Palatset (1979)
- Ögonvittnet (1980)
- Doktor Mabuses nya testamente (1982, co-author: Per Olov Enquist))
- Arvskifte (1983)
- Maktens hemligheter (1986)
- Protagoras sats (1987)
- Slottet (1990)
- Rättvisa och makt (1992)
- Resan till Kilimanjaro (1993)
- Tre essäer om befrielse och frihet (1994)
- Den döda vinkeln (1994)
- Resa i skuggan (1995)
- Minnets hemlighet (1999)
- Frihetens rike (2001)
- Krigsvinter (2002)
- Tal på Övralid 6 juli 2002 (2002)
- En stad i ljus (2005)

== Awards and honors ==
- 1993 – Honorary doctorate (University of Gothenburg)
- 1998 – John Landquist Prize (Samfundet De Nio)
- 2002 – Övralid Prize (Övralid Foundation)
