= Samlade verk =

2020 novel by Lydia Sandgren

Samlade verk (Collected Works)
- First edition
- Author: Lydia Sandgren
- Cover artist: Heike Schüssler
- Language: Swedish
- Set in: Gothenburg, Sweden
- Published: 2020
- Publisher: Albert Bonniers Förlag
- Publication place: Sweden
- Pages: 690
- Awards: August Prize (2020)

Samlade verk (lit. Collected Works) is a 2020 debut novel by Swedish writer Lydia Sandgren (born 1987). It won the August Prize for Fiction on the same year it was published.

== Synopsis ==
Set in Gothenburg, Gustav Becker, a distinguished artist, is being prepared for a major retrospective in his career from the 1980s onwards. At the same time, a psychology student Rachel changes and meets her mysteriously missing mother's face on an exhibition poster that is wallpapered across town. In the same vein, Rachel's father, the publisher Martin Berg, is thrown into a dizzying life crisis.
