= Maja Lundgren =

Swedish writer (born 1965)

Maja Lundgren (born 18 March 1965) is a Swedish author, literary critic and translator. She is the daughter of translator, author, and journalist Caj Lundgren and translator Astrid Lundgren.

In 2001, Lundgren's book Pompeji was praised by practically all critics, and it won several prizes, Swedish and international. Her second book Myggor och tigrar (2007) got a more mixed reception, but it was widely discussed due to the open exposure of literary circles in Sweden, where – according to the author – men looked down on women. There were also debates about the distinction between fiction and biography, the responsibilities of publishers for controversial works, and the use of named real-life persons in novels. In the years since its publication, many critics have changed their views about Myggor och tigrar and many regard it as one of the most interesting and groundbreaking Swedish novels from the early 2000s.

== Bibliography ==
- Sprickan i ögat, 1993
- Pompeji, 2001
- Myggor och tigrar, 2007
- Mäktig tussilago, 2010
- Den skenande planeten, 2019
