= Ola Wikander =

Swedish writer, translator and theologian

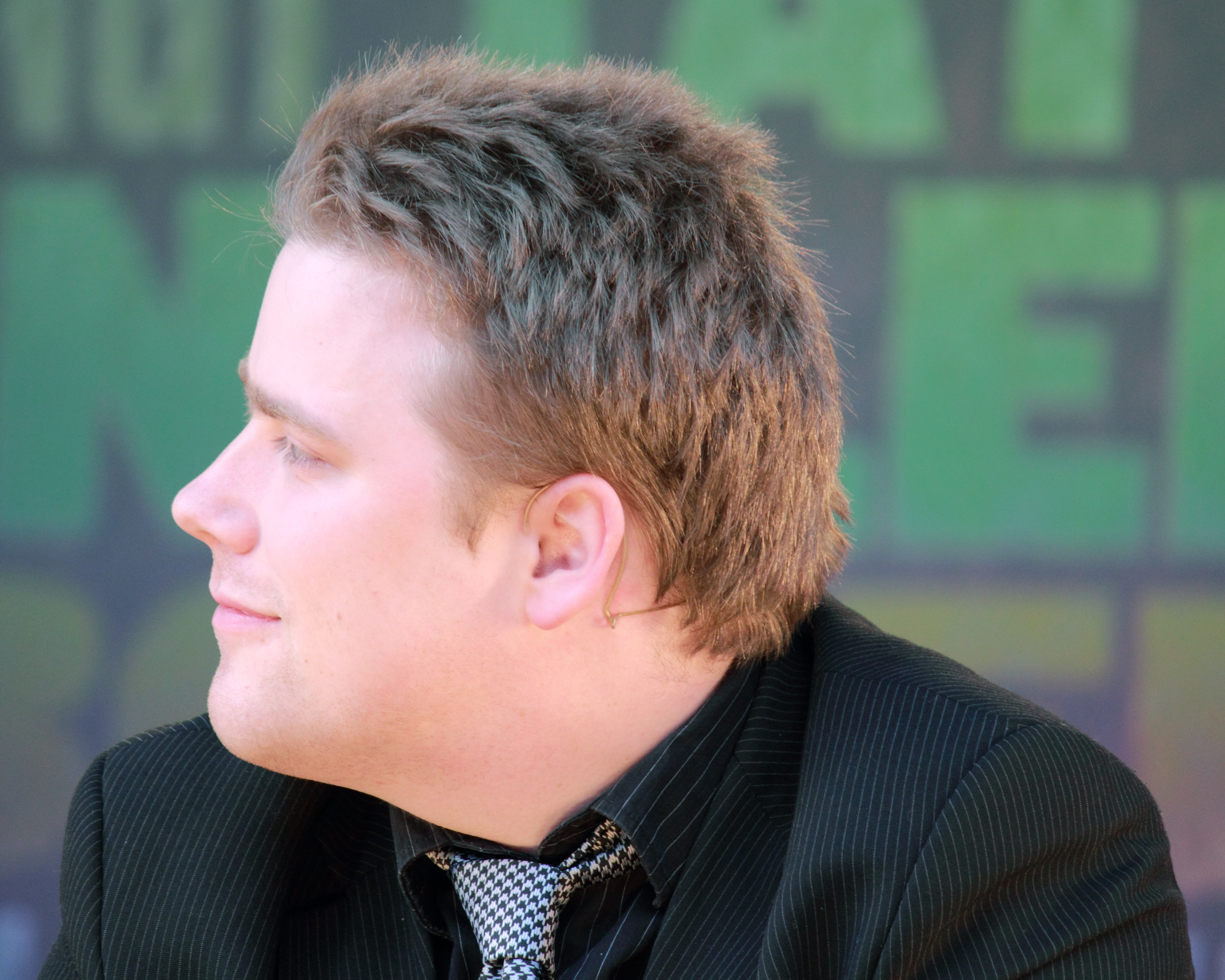
- Wikander in 2010
- Born: 1981 (age 44–45)
- Occupations: Writer; translator; theologian
- Employer: Lund University
- Awards: Zibet prize (2009)
- Website: ola-wikander.se

Ola Wikander (born 1981) is a Swedish writer, translator and theologian.

== Life ==
Both his parents are antiquarians; as a child his father began teaching him Latin.

=== Education ===
In June 2012, Wikander defended his doctorate for theology in the subject of the Old Testament exegesis at the Centrum för teologi och religionsvetenskap (Center for Theology and Religious Studies) at Lund.

=== Career ===
Since 2012 he held a series of short-term academic positions in Sweden and the UK until he was appointed Senior Lecturer/Associate Professor at the Centre for Theology and Religious Studies, Lund. In 2018–2019, Wikander was a Residential Fellow at the Swedish Collegium for Advanced Study in Uppsala, Sweden, as part of the Pro Futura Scientia Program.

He has written the book I döda språks sällskap (2006), which is about extinct languages, translations, and among other things, the Babylonian creation story of Enûma Eliš. In May 2008 came his first novel, Poeten och cirkelmakaren, which he has written with his father Örjan Wikander.

Wikander's review of the history of Proto-Indo-European language (2008) has been well received by reviewers in both Svenska Dagbladet and Dagens Nyheter. In 2010, Ola Wikander received the Clio Prize. Price motivation sounded "for their commitment to extinct languages and the keys that their vocabulary and development provide to our oldest cultural history".

== Prizes and awards ==
- 2005 – Letterstedtska award for the translation of Canaanite myths and legends
- 2006 – August Prize
- 2009 – Zibetsk Prize
- 2010 – The Clio Prize

== Notable Publications ==
- Wikander, Ola (2003). Kanaaneiska myter och legender.
- —————— (2005). Enuma elish: det babyloniska skapelseeposet.
- —————— (2006). I döda språks sällskap: en bok om väldigt gamla språk.
- —————— (2008). De kaldeiska oraklen.
- —————— (2008). Poeten och cirkelmakaren.
- —————— (2008). Ett träd med vida grenar: de indoeuropeiska språkens historia.
- —————— (2010). Orden och evigheten.
- —————— (2012). Drought, Death and the Sun in Ugarit and Ancient Israel. Academic monograph.
- —————— (2012). Serafers drömmar.
- —————— (2014). Gud är ett verb – tankar om Gamla testamentet och dess idéhistoria.
- —————— (2015). Den trettonde funktionen.
- —————— (2017). Unburning Fame: Horses, Dragons, Beings of Smoke, and Other Indo-European Motifs in Ugarit and the Hebrew Bible. Academic monograph.

Wikander has also published many articles for researchers and the public and runs two blogs, since 2008 in Swedish at Ur språkens tunnlar and between 2008 and 2011 in English at Dead Tongues Whispering
