= Moa Matthis =

Swedish literature critic and author

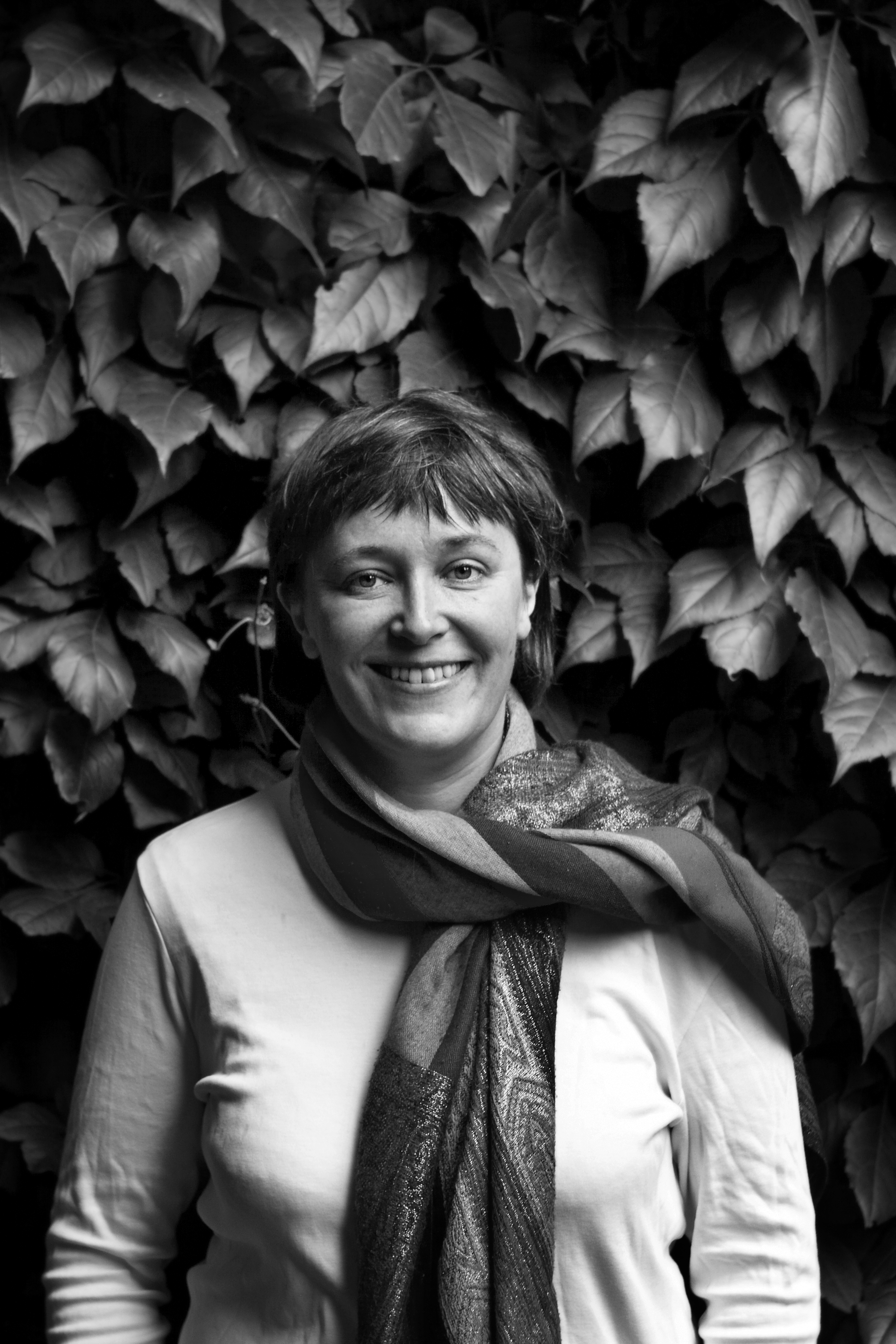
Moa Matthis

Moa Matthis (born 21 March 1966) is a Swedish literature critic and author. She writes for Dagens Nyheter, and she writes articles and books mostly for a feminist angle.

== Bibliography (selection) ==
- Moa Matthis: "--- och nu och alla dagar prisar jag så mycket jag nånsin förmår Eros makt och manliga sinne" - om det manliga begärets betydelse för kvinnorna, i Claudia Lindén och Ulrika Milles (redaktörer): Feministisk bruksanvisning, Norstedts 1995, ISBN 91-1-949251-0
- Anne Hedén, Ulrika Milles och Moa Matthis: Över alla hinder, Bonniers 2000
- Moa Matthis : Orientalism på svenska, Ordfront i samarbete med Re:Orient 2005
- Moa Matthis: Feminister och pionjärer. Om fyra kvinnliga författare och äventyrare, Norstedts, 2006, ISBN 91-1-301234-7
- Moa Matthis: Maria Eleonora: drottningen som sa nej, Bonniers 2010, ISBN 9789100113544
