= Den nya nordiska floran =

2003 book of Swedish flora by Bo Mossberg and Lennart Stenberg

- Cover of the 2010 version.
- Author: Lennart Stenberg; Bo Mossberg
- Illustrator: Bo Mossberg
- Language: Swedish
- Subject: Botany
- Publisher: Wahlström & Widstrand
- Publication date: 18 September 2003
- Publication place: Sweden
- Media type: Print (hardcover)
- Pages: 928
- ISBN: 978-91-46-17584-1

Den nya nordiska floran ("The new Nordic flora") is a book of Swedish flora from 2003 by Bo Mossberg and Lennart Stenberg, with illustrations by Bo Mossberg. It contains descriptions, illustrations and distribution maps of all plants in Sweden, Denmark, Norway (including Svalbard), Finland, Faroe Islands and Iceland, a total of more than 3,250 species. It is a sequel to the earlier book Den nordiska floran. It has been called indispensable as a reference book, but criticized for being too heavy to be a field flora. It was translated into Danish by Jon Feilberg, titled Den Nye Nordiske Flora. The book is fact-checked by Thomas Karlsson. It was also translated into Norwegian by Steinar Moen, with fact-checking by Svein Båtvik. The title of this version is Gyldendals store nordiske flora. Revidert og utvidet utgave.

== Editions ==
- Mossberg, Bo; Stenberg, Lennart (18 September 2003). Den nya nordiska floran. p. 928. ISBN 978-91-46-17584-1. Archived from the original on 25 August 2010.
- Mossberg, Bo; Stenberg, Lennart (30 October 2006). Den nya nordiska floran. p. 928. ISBN 978-91-46-21319-2. Archived from the original on 25 August 2010.
- Mossberg, Bo; Stenberg, Lennart (24 May 2010). Den nya nordiska floran. p. 928. ISBN 978-91-7424-095-5. Archived from the original on 25 August 2010.
