= Cilla Naumann =

Swedish author and journalist

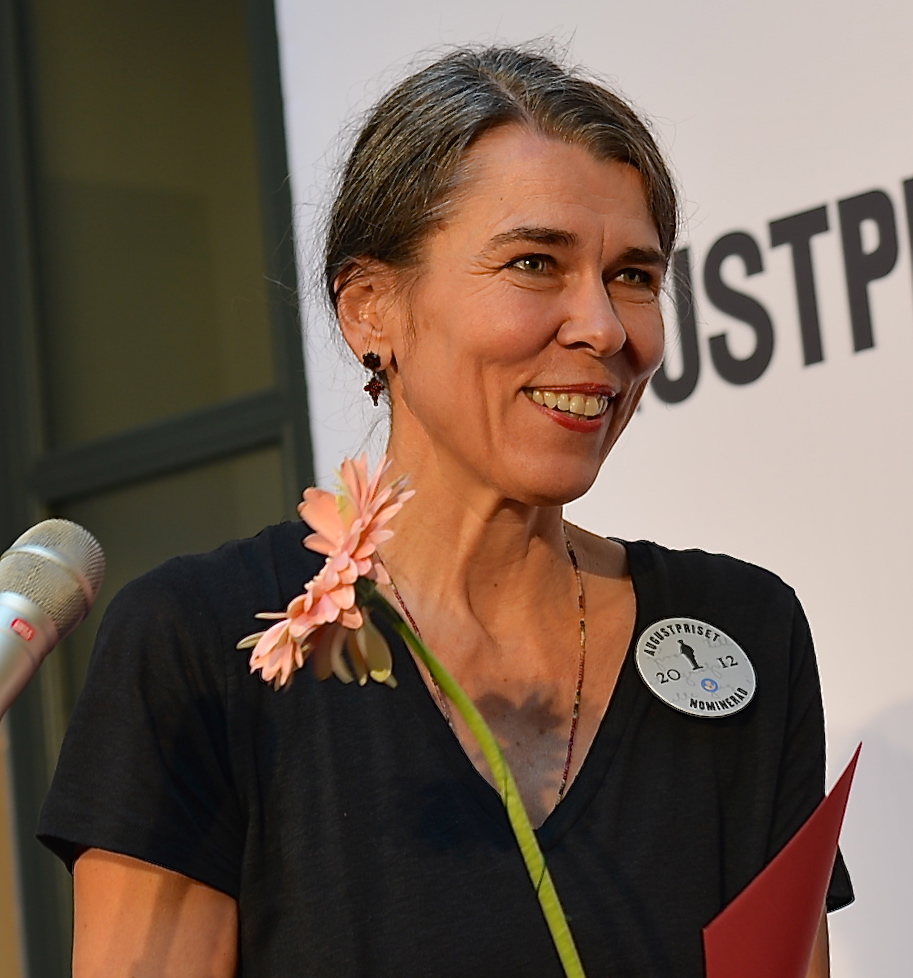
Cilla Naumann in 2012

Cilla Naumann (born 16 July 1960) is a Swedish author and journalist. Her first book, Vattenhjärta, came out in 1995. It won the Katapulpriset for "Best debut of the Year". Her next book was Dom, published in 2000.

== Bibliography ==
- 1995 – Vattenhjärta
- 1996 – Väntan tillbaka
- 1998 – Vågorna Alma, vågorna
- 2000 – Dom
- 2002– Dem oss skyldiga äro
- 2004 – Fly
- 2006 – Värsta brorsan
- 2007 – Vad ser du nu
- 2009 – I cirklarna runt
- 2009 – Kulor i hjärtat
- 2011 – 62 dagar
- 2011 – Lära sig
- 2012 – Springa med åror
- 2013 – 17 timmar härifrån
- 2015 – Bära barnet hem
