= Tore Janson =

Swedish linguist (born 1936)

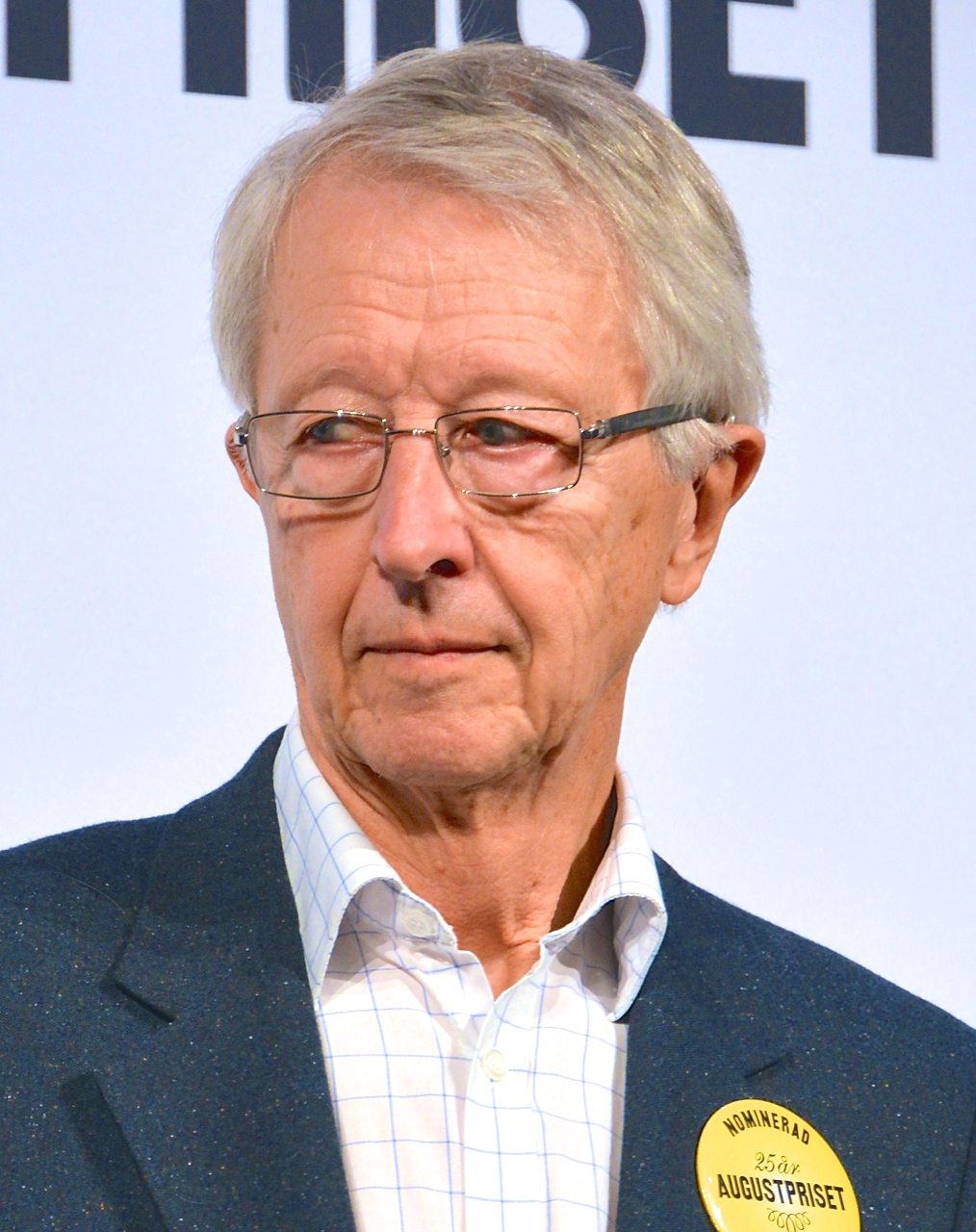

Tore Janson (born 1936) is a Swedish linguist. Janson was professor of Latin at the University of Gothenburg, and later became professor of African languages at the same alma mater. He retired in 2001, but has since been affiliated with the Stockholm University.

He devoted much of his time and publishing activities to the way languages change as well as the relationship between language and society.

He is the author of the international bestsellers Speak: A Short History of Languages and A Natural History of Latin.

== Works ==
English

- Speak: A Short History of Languages, Oxford: Oxford University Press, 2002. ISBN 978-0-19-829978-3
- A Natural History of Latin, Oxford: Oxford University Press 2004. ISBN 978-0-19-926309-7
- The History of Languages: An Introduction, Oxford: Oxford University Press, 2012. ISBN 978-0-19-960428-9

Swedish

- Latin Kulturen, historien, språket, Wahlström & Widstrand, 2002 ISBN 91-46-18335-3
- Språken och historien (transl. language and history), Stockholm: Norstedts, 2008. ISBN 978-91-7227-587-4
- Språkens historia. En upptäcktsresa i tid och rum (transl. Language's history, a discovery journey across time and space), Stockholm: Norstedts, 2010. ISBN 978-91-1-303308-2
- Germanerna, Stockholm: Norstedts, 2013. ISBN 978-91-1-303286-3
