= Carola Hansson =

Swedish novelist, dramatist and translator

Carola Hansson-Boëthius (born 7 September 1942) is a Swedish novelist, dramatist and translator.

== Biography ==
Born in Stockholm, Carola Hansson studied Russian and history of art and literature at Uppsala University. Together with Karin Lindén, she authored her first work in 1980, Samtal med kvinnor i Moskva, translated into English as Moscow Women: Thirteen Interviews, published in 1983.

Hansson's first novel, Det drömda barnet (The Dream Child) was published in 1983, presenting the feelings of fear and longing she experienced in childhood and which typify her later works, especially Pojken från Jerusalem (1986), De två trädgårdarna (1989) and Resan till det blå huset (1991). She became widely recognized in 1994 with Andrej, a novel about the Tolstoy family, which was well received by the critics. Her most recent work, Med ett namn som mitt (With a Name like Mine, 2009), follows on from Andrej in an episode based on a meeting between the author and someone who claims to have known Tolstoy's son, Ilya Tolstoy.

== Bibliography ==
- Samtal med kvinnor i Moskva 1980 (non-fiction, authored together with Karin Lidén)
- Kvinnan och Ryssland 1981 (non-fiction with Karin Lidén)
- Det drömda barnet, novel, 1983
- Stilleben i vitt, novel, 1985
- Pojken från Jerusalem, novel, 1987
- De två trädgårdarna, novel, 1989
- Resan till det blå huset, novel, 1991
- Steinhof, novel, 1997,
- Den älskvärde, novel. 2000
- Mästarens dröm, novel, 2005
- Leo Tolstoy's family trilogy:
  - Andrej, novel, 1994
  - Med ett namn som mitt, 2009
  - Masja, 2015

== Awards ==
Hansson has received several awards including the Swedish Radio Novel Prize in 1995 and the Dobloug Prize in 2006.
