= Aniara =

1956 poem by Harry Martinson

- by Harry Martinson
- The second English translation (1999) with artwork by Paul Joseph Pope
- Translator: Hugh MacDiarmid and E. Harley Schubert (1963); Stephen Klass and Leif Sjöberg (1999)
- Written: 1953–1956
- Country: Sweden
- Language: Swedish
- Genre: Science fiction
- Publication date: 13 October 1956
- Published in English: 1963, 1999
- ISBN: 1-885266-63-4

Aniara (Swedish: Aniara: en revy om människan i tid och rum, lit. 'Aniara: a revue of man in time and space') is a book-length epic science fiction poem written by Swedish Nobel laureate Harry Martinson from 1953 to 1956. It narrates the tragedy of a large passenger spacecraft carrying a cargo of colonists escaping destruction on Earth veering off course, leaving the Solar System and entering into an existential struggle. The style is symbolic, sweeping and innovative for its time, with creative use of neologisms to suggest the science fictional setting. It was published in its final form on 13 October 1956.

Aniara has been translated to around twenty languages. There are numerous adaptations including an opera in 1959 and a Swedish feature film in 2018.

Aniara, published in October 1956, was met with public interest and enthusiasm from literary critics and readers. The work was praised for its lyrical storytelling, profound thought, and its portrayal of human greatness turning into humiliation and powerlessness. Aniara has influenced other works of science fiction, such as Tau Zero (1970) by Poul Anderson and A Fire Upon the Deep (1992) by Vernor Vinge. The poem has become a landmark literary work and is often used as the basis for planetarium shows in Sweden. In 2019, the extrasolar planet HD 102956 b was named after Isagel, a character from the story, and its star was named Aniara.

== Title and background ==
In a 1997 Swedish edition of Aniara, literary scholar Johan Wrede writes that the neologism “Aniara” is Harry Martinson's own invention. Martinson came up with the word years before writing the work while reading astronomer Arthur Eddington, then giving it the meaning as the "name for the space in which the atoms move". Others have submitted additional theories as to the origin of the word. A preface to a 2005 Italian edition claims that the title comes from ancient Greek ἀνιαρός, "sad, despairing", plus special resonances that the sound "a" had for Martinson. Another theory of unclear origin makes up the word "Aniara" from the chemical symbols Ni (Nickel) and Ar (Argon) and the negative prefix "a-", and interprets this as the ship being untethered to both earth (Nickel being abundant in the Earth's core) and sky (Argon being abundant in the Earth's atmosphere). Martinson himself is said (by Tord Hall, longtime friend) to have been fond of this interpretation.

The first 29 poems of Aniara were originally published as Sången om Doris och Mima ("The Song about Doris and Mima") in Martinson's 1953 poetry collection Cikada. The poem cycle was inspired by Martinson catching the Andromeda Galaxy in a telescope one August night in 1953. Martinson variously claimed that the complete cycle was written in two or three weeks. On the November 1953 publication of Cikada critics particularly praised Sången om Doris och Mima and publishers urged Martinson to write a continuation.

The writing of Aniara in 1953 to 1956 was influenced by contemporary concerns such as the Cold War with the threat of the atomic bomb, the revelations of cruelties during World War II and the opression in communist-led countries, the space race between the super powers of the world, combined with Martinson's life-long interest in astronomy and the outer space.

Aniara was by contemporary readers associated with science fiction. Martinson had read some science fiction literature in his youth by authors such as Camille Flammarion and Jules Verne, but the main influence on the writing of the original 29 poem cycle was popular science books about astronomy, mathematics, atom physics and nuclear weapons. It was only after the publication of Sången om Doris och Mima in 1953 that Martinson became more interested in the contemporarily popular science fiction and began an extensive reading of science fiction books, once citing A. E. van Vogt as the best writer in the genre. Olaf Stapledon's 1930 novel Last and First Men shares some thematic similarities with Aniara.

== Interpretation ==
According to Ott and Broman, Aniara is an effort to "[mediate] between science and poetry, between the wish to understand and the difficulty to comprehend". Martinson translates scientific imagery into the poem: for example, the "curved space" from Albert Einstein's general theory of relativity is likely an inspiration for Martinson's description of the cosmos as "a bowl of glass", according to the Nobel Prize Foundation. Martinson also said he was influenced by Paul Dirac.

== The poem ==
The poem consists of 103 cantos, together relating the tragedy of a large passenger spacecraft originally bound for Mars with a cargo of colonists from the ravaged Earth. After an accident, the ship is ejected from the Solar System and into an existential struggle.

We listen daily to the sonic coins
provided every one of us and played
through the Finger-singer worn on the left hand.
We trade coins of diverse denominations:
and all of them play all that they contain
and though a dyma 1 scarcely weighs one grain
it plays out like a cricket on each hand
blanching here in this distraction-land.

The first 29 cantos of Aniara had previously been published in Martinson's collection Cikada (1953), under the title Sången om Doris och Mima (The Song of Doris and Mima), relating the departure from Earth, the accidental near-collision with an asteroid (named Hondo, another name for the main Japanese isle of Honshu, where Ott and Broman notes the atom bombs were dropped) and ejection from the solar system, the first few years of increasing despair and distractions of the passengers, until news is received of the destruction of their home port, and perhaps of Earth itself. According to Martinson, he dictated the initial cycle as in a fever after a troubling dream, affected by the Cold War and the Soviet suppression of the 1956 Hungarian revolution; in another recounting, he said the first 29 cantos were said to be inspired by his observation of the Andromeda Galaxy.

A major theme is that of art, symbolised by the semi-mystical machinery of the Mima, who relieves the ennui of crew and passengers with scenes of far-off times and places, and whose operator is also the sometimes naïve main narrator. The rooms of Mima, according to Martinson, represent different kinds of life styles or forms of consciousness. The accumulated destruction the Mima witnesses impels her to destroy herself in despair, to which she, the machine, is finally moved by the white tears of the granite melted by the phototurb which annihilates their home port, the great city of Dorisburg. Without the succour of the Mima, the erstwhile colonists seek distraction in sensual orgies, memories of their own and earlier lives, low comedy, religious cults, observations of strange astronomical phenomena, empty entertainments, science, routine tasks, brutal totalitarianism, and in all kinds of human endeavour, but ultimately cannot face the emptiness outside and inside.

The poems are metrical and mostly rhymed, using both traditional and individual forms, several alluding to a wide range of Swedish and Nordic poetry, such as the Finnish Kalevala.

== Publications ==
Aniara was published by Albert Bonniers förlag in October 1956 and became the second best-selling book in Sweden in 1956 after Vilhelm Mobergs hugely popular novel The Settlers. By the end of 1958 Aniara had sold over 20 000 copies in Sweden.

Aniara has been translated to around twenty languages including French, German, Italian, Danish, Finnish, Norwegian, Czech, Russian, Spanish, Japanese, Chinese, Arabic, Hebrew, English, and Esperanto.

It was translated into English as Aniara, A Review of Man in Time and Space by Hugh MacDiarmid and E. Harley Schubert in 1963. It was translated again into English by Stephen Klass and Leif Sjöberg for a 1999 edition, published by Story Line Press. Neither edition is currently in print.

Geoffrey O'Brien, writing for the New York Review of Books, compares the two editions and finds the recent Klass Sjöberg edition more faithful to "Martinson's formal schemes" while considering the MacDiarmid Schubert edition "more persuasive" as English poetry. Burns Singer wrote of the original translation "it may well prove a seminal volume in the history of English letters" in Times Literary Supplement. (Note: His business as a poet does not include the development of new principles of cosmology or the invention of thought systems but is rather concerned with details which will make credible whatever cosmology or thought systems he adopts. (...) (T)here are passages in which his conception justifies itself and the words radiate a kind of austere but delicate simplicity. (...) (I)t was a bold move to translate this work and it may well prove a seminal volume in the history of English letters." - Burns Singer, Times Literary Supplement)

== Reception ==
The publication of Aniara in October 1956 was met with much public interest and was enthusiastically received by many Swedish literary critics and readers. In Dagens Nyheter, Olof Lagercrantz praised Martinson for his "brilliant inventiveness" and "as of yet unsurpassed scope". In Göteborgs Handels- och Sjöfartstidning, Erik Hjalmar Linder called it a "remarkable" work were Martinson "appeared as the most prominent poet of the atom age". Margit Abenius in Bonniers Litterära Magasin said that the Aniara's "magic is so strong that the reader for long moments seems to dwell in the clear dark timelessness of the space". Bo Strömstedt in Expressen wrote: "it is a fabulous story, and Harry Martinson tells it with an ingenuity – in substance and in words – that is also quite fabulous; even though most of the songs are written in the same iambic verse, the book never becomes monotonous." "Harry Martinson has not only written a breathtakingly lyrical science fiction story; he has also (...) created a gigantic "Paradise lost", an epic about how human greatness is turned into humiliation and powerlessness".

The well-known American science fiction writer, Theodore Sturgeon, in reviewing a 1964 American edition for a genre audience, stated that "Martinson's achievement here is an inexpressible, immeasurable sadness. [It] [t]ranscends panic and terror and even despair [and] leaves you in the quiet immensities, with the feeling that you have spent time, and have been permanently tinted, by and with an impersonal larger-than-God force."

Writing a guest review for The New York Times, D. Bruce Lockerbie suggested that with Aniara Martinson had, along with C. S. Lewis, "found that an interplanetary setting, light years removed from mundanity" supplied "the esthetic distance necessary for truly profound thought."

The poem has also been reviewed more recently. In a 2015 review, James Nicoll writes "Martinson’s creative approach to astronomy and related matters gives the work an misleadingly archaic feel." M. A. Orthofer finds in 2018, the poem "a product of its times, but even as aspects may no longer seem as current, it holds up well in its bleak vision." In his 2019 overview of Martinson's works in the New York Review of Books, Geoffrey O'Brien concludes "Aniara is an epic of extinction, conceived at a moment when extinction had begun to seem not only possible but perhaps imminent."

== Legacy ==
Aniara has had an influence on later works of science fiction, such as Tau Zero by Danish-American writer Poul Anderson. In A Fire Upon the Deep (1992) author Vernor Vinge uses the story of Aniara as a myth as part of the story's background story.

In the 2004 centennial celebration of the birth of Harry Martinson, the Martinson Society characterized Aniara as an "epic poem about the spaceship in which we flee the destruction of the earth, the spaceship that drifts off course into an endless universe", and considered the poem to have achieved becoming a legend in their own right, one of the myths people are familiar with without necessarily knowing who created them.

In December 2019, the extrasolar planet HD 102956 b was named after a character aboard the spacecraft, the pilot Isagel, as part of the IAU NameExoWorlds project. The exoplanet's star was named Aniara.

== Adaptations ==
An opera by Karl-Birger Blomdahl also called Aniara premiered in 1959 with a libretto by Erik Lindegren based on Martinson's poem; it was staged in Stockholm, Hamburg, Brussels and Darmstadt, and later in Gothenburg and Malmö. A performance by the Royal Swedish Opera at the Edinburgh International Festival was broadcast on the BBC Third Programme in Sept 1959.

Aniara (1960), a Swedish TV film directed by Arne Arnbom, written by Erik Lindegren and Harry Martinson, and starring Margareta Hallin, Elisabeth Söderström, Erik Sædén and Arne Tyrén. The music was composed by Karl-Birger Blomdahl.

The BBC Third Programme broadcast an English translation, read over five nights, in November 1962.

In Martinson's home country of Sweden, Aniara has commonly been used as the basis of planetarium shows, the first one set up in 1988 by Björn Stenholm using music by Dmitrij Shostakovich in the planetarium then housed in what is now the Old Observatory in Lund, Sweden. An English-language show premiered during the International Planetarium Society conference in Salt Lake City, Utah in 1992.

Tommy Körberg headlined 31 songs from Aniara, a stage concert first set up in Olofström, Sweden in 1997.

The fourth album from the Swedish progressive metal band Seventh Wonder called The Great Escape (2010) is based on Aniara, the title track last 30:21 minutes and relates all the poem from beginning to end.

Swedish musician Kleerup released an album based on Aniara in 2012.

A melding of Aniara and Beethoven's opera Fidelio was staged by the Opéra de Lyon under the direction of American artist Gary Hill in 2013.

Aniara, a 2018 Swedish feature film by directors Pella Kågerman and Hugo Lilja, starring Emelie Jonsson, premiered at the Toronto International Film Festival that year. Also in 2018, artist Fia Backstrom made the installation A Vaudeville on Mankind in Time and Space, using Aniara as its point of origin.

Aniara: Fragments of Time and Space, a choral theatre work with The Crossing, Helsinki’s Klockriketeatern, and composer Robert Maggio was performed in 2019."
