= End of Summer (TV series) =

Swedish television series

- Genre: Crime thriller
- Based on: End of Summer by Anders de la Motte
- Screenplay by: Stefan Thunberg; Björn Carlström
- Directed by: Jens Jonsson; Henrik Georgsson
- Starring: Julia Ragnarsson; Erik Enge
- Country of origin: Sweden
- Original language: Swedish
- No. of series: 1
- No. of episodes: 6

Production
- Producers: Stefan Thunberg; Björn Carlström; Per Janérus
- Production companies: Viaplay; Harmonica Films; SF Studios; Film i Skåne

Original release
- Release: 23 October 2023

End of Summer (Swedish: Slutet på sommaren) is a Swedish television series, which was broadcast from 23 October 2023. It is an adaptation of the 2016 novel of the same name by Anders de la Motte. It stars Julia Ragnarsson and Erik Enge.

The six-part series is produced by Viaplay and directed by Jens Jonsson and Henrik Georgsson. It was written by Stefan Thunberg and Björn Carlström, who also produced the series with Per Janérus. The series is also produced with Harmonica Films, SF Studios and Film i Skåne.

== Premise ==
Action is set in 2004 and 1984 in both Stockholm and the fictitious town of Reftinge in Skåne, Sweden. As a child in 1984, Vera witnesses her mother Magdalena's suicide by drowning herself in a lake near Reftinge. As an adult in 2004, Vera is a psychologist facilitator for a grief support group. After becoming sexually involved with a client, Vera has been put on probation in her job. Vera promises that the relationship has ended, but her sessions with the group are kept under observation by a manager until she is deemed to be capable enough to rejoin the clinic's practice and work independently.

Vera meets a young man, Isak, who comes to one group meeting. Isak claims that when his mother died, she told him he was adopted. Some of his confused early memories remind Vera of her own childhood and her younger brother Billy - who disappeared from Reftinge 20 years previously, in 1984. Vera becomes obsessed with Isak, thinking that he is the now-adult Billy. Her rather tactless investigations cause ructions with her still-grieving father Ebbe, her policeman brother Mattias, and her impulsive uncle Harald. All three men are convinced that Tommy Rooth, a local drifter, was involved in Billy's abduction (and possible murder – no corpse was found).

Over the course of six episodes, the truth emerges.

== Cast and characters ==
The cast is led by Julia Ragnarsson and Erik Enge:

- Julia Ragnarsson as Vera Nilsson: psychiatrist, grief counsellor at Saint Göran Hospital, Stockholm
- Erik Enge as Isak: young man, claims to be adopted as child
- Vilhelm Blomgren as Mattias Nilsson: Vera's older brother, Reftinge policeman
- Ida Gyllensten as Magdalena Nilsson (1947–1984): Vera, Mattias, Billy's mother; Ebbe's wife. Died by suicide
- Lars Schilken as Ebbe Nilsson (born 1944): Mattias, Vera's father; corn farmer
- Simon J. Berger as Krister Månsson: Reftinge police inspector during Billy's disappearance. Later, recovering alcoholic
- Torkel Petersson as Harald: Vera's uncle, Magdalena's brother; prominent farmer
- Ellen Nikka as Young Vera: 12-year-old, Billy's sister, lives near Reftinge
- Linus James Nilsson as Tommy Rooth: Magdalena's former lover, Nilla's husband, odd jobs man
- Jerker Fahlström as Kjell Åke Runberg a.k.a. "Sailor": Tommy's friend
- Anna Granath as Berit Möller: hairdresser, Harald's lover
- Akay Jasarovski as Billy Nilsson: 5-year-old, Vera's younger brother; missing 20 years ago
- Ruben Lopez as Leon Vargas: Vera's former client, became her lover
- Linda Kunze Nahlin as Cissi: Mattias' wife, Vera's sister-in-law
- Rolf Lydahl as Lennart Vikström: Reftinge police assistant during Billy's disappearance
- Per Ragnar as Jeppson: Harald's worker, henchman
- Anna Bjelkerud as Ruud: Vera's former employer
- Henrik Norlén as Lars: Vera's client, becomes infatuated with her
- Staffan Kihlbom Thor as Bengt: Adult Psychiatric Clinic manager, supervises Vera
- Sandra Redlaff as Nilla Rooth: Tommy's wife, mother of two children
- William Jannert as Young Mattias: Vera's older brother
- Sasha Becker as Åsa: runs scrapyard-rental business
- Bahador Foladi as Karim: journalist researching Billy's disappearance
- Emelie Garbers as Malin Månsson: Krister's wife

== Broadcast ==
It was first broadcast from 23 October 2023 on Viaplay. It appeared on Viaplay's Australian partners SBS On Demand in March 2024. In April 2024, rights for the series were acquired in France by Polar+, and in the United Kingdom by the BBC.

== Episode guide ==
No.	Title	Directed by	Written by	Original release date
1	"Episode 1" (Avsnitt 1)	Henrik Georgsson, Jens Jonsson	Björn Carlström, Stefan Thunberg, Anders de la Motte	23 October 2023
Flashback: Magdalena rows boat across lake, drowns herself in front of Young Vera. Present: Lars describes shame over daughter's death. Bengt observes session. Vera lies to Ruud: affair with Leon has ended. At home, Vera sees shadowed figure outside. Next session, Vera invites Isak to join. Isak claims he was adopted; has vague memories: people searching for missing boy. Lars interrupts, describing Billy's disappearance. Bengt stops Lars: it's Isak's turn. Vera apologises to Isak for Lars' interruptions. Flashback: Ebbe asks Young Vera to go shopping before visiting friend. After adjusting her bicycle, Tommy rinses her greasy hands. Later, she puts away groceries, plays with Billy. Mother scolds Vera, cuddles Billy. Vera leaves for friend's place, Billy follows. They argue; Billy walks homewards. Ebbe arrives home. Townsfolk search for Billy. Police join search. Present: Vera and Leon have sex. Vera to Mattias: Isak's story. Bengt: Lars not returning. Isak does not attend. Flashback: searchers discover Billy's sandal. Present: Vera finds former neighbour, Isak Sjölin (not recently met Isak). Sjölin describes Karim. Vera encounters Karim, who provides files. Drunken Lars accosts Vera; Isak defends her, gets injured. Vera lets Isak sleep on couch. Vera reads Karim's material; could Isak be Billy?
2	"Episode 2" (Avsnitt 2)	Henrik Georgsson, Jens Jonsson	Björn Carlström, Stefan Thunberg, Anders de la Motte	29 October 2023
Flashback: Harald learns Billy's missing. Young Vera apologises to Magdalena. Harald tells Krister: Tommy took Billy. "Sailor" provides Tommy's alibi. Vera to Harald: saw Tommy near farm. Present: Vera photographs Isak. Lars complains to Bengt about Vera and Isak. Ruud: did Vera contact client outside therapy? Isak sees Karim's files; runs off. Instead of meeting Ruud and Bengt, Vera drives to Ebbe's farm. Vera checks Billy's bedroom. Mattias visits. Ebbe does not recall Magdalena's car accident. Vera shows Isak's photo; asks whether they see resemblance. Ebbe walks off. Mattias: Isak's not Billy. Ruud berates Vera for no show; Vera claims Ebbe's ill. Mattias: Tommy rolled car in 1965; Magdalena unmentioned. Berit recalls Magdalena in car with Tommy. Ebbe overhears Vera leaving message for "Sailor". Ebbe asks Vera to stop investigating. Vera, Ebbe at Harald's to celebrate Ebbe's birthday. Cissi asks Vera about Isak reminding her of Billy. Ebbe's insulted, leaves table. Vera to Harald: helping Isak with memories. Harald got police to remove Magdalena from report. Harald blacklisted Tommy from local jobs. Tommy returned with wife and children. Harald organised Tommy's beating. Mattias asks Vera to leave town. Vera visits "Sailor" in aged care. "Sailor": Tommy did not kill Billy.
3	"Episode 3" (Avsnitt 3)	Henrik Georgsson, Jens Jonsson	Björn Carlström, Stefan Thunberg, Anders de la Motte	30 October 2023
Flashback: Billy's search continues into night, next day. Young Vera prays for Billy. Harald wakes Magdalena; cannot remember Billy returning. Harald asks Nilla for Tommy; assaults her. Tommy arrives, warns Harald to leave them alone. Police accept "Sailor"'s alibi. Young Mattias believes Billy's alive. Present: Harald tells Vera about Tommy's coal mine hideout; he secreted Billy in closet. Police found Billy's photo. Harald: Tommy disposed of Billy down mine shaft. At mine, Vera finds child's comic and Isak, who walks away. Vera falls into well; Isak throws down rope, saves Vera. Mattias to Harald: Isak's after Vera's money. Isak recognised Tommy's photo. "Sailor" told Isak about Tommy's hideout. Flashback: Ebbe checks whether Magdalena's taking her medication. She goes out. Later, Ebbe, Magdalena dance together. Present: Ebbe dines with Mattias, Cissi. Mattias praises Ebbe's steadfastness during Magdalena's illnesses. Cissi: Vera's still in town. Vera takes Isak to Ebbe's home. Isak sees Billy's photo. Vera shows him Billy's room. Mattias brings Ebbe home. Ebbe orders Isak out. Vera refuses Mattias' checking Isak's identity. Mattias writes down Isak's number plate. Harald assaults "Sailor": forget about Tommy. Vera tries to give Isak money. Mattias sends Billy's tooth, Isak's saliva for DNA comparison.
4	"Episode 4" (Avsnitt 4)	Henrik Georgsson, Jens Jonsson	Björn Carlström, Axel Stjärne, Stefan Thunberg, Anders de la Motte	6 November 2023
Flashback: Son wakes Krister. Malin returns from work. Krister learns Billy's missing. Magdalena to Krister: forgot when Billy went, thought Billy was with Vera; Ebbe arrived home: no Billy. Harald: sandal indicates kidnapping; arrest Tommy. Krister: require better evidence. Young Vera: saw Tommy near farm, but lies: afternoon. Harald: Tommy has hideout. Nilla: Tommy left this morning. Police stop Tommy's car. Krister, Rennart interview Tommy. Tommy: Rennart falsifed police records. Harald organised Magdalena's name removal when Tommy arrested for drink driving. Harald berates Krister for not immediately arresting Tommy. Krister orders Tommy's blood sampled. At Tommy's hideout, Krister finds Billy's photo, child's comic. Tommy arrested for kidnapping, but denies it. Harald visits Krister. "Sailor" saw Tommy when Billy disappeared. Police search "Sailor"'s home; photos sold to newspapers. Magdalena: Billy photographed weeks before. Magdalena overdoses on medications; but recovers. Harald granted access to Tommy. Tommy taunts Harald, who attacks. Krister releases Tommy. Harald and Jeppson block Tommy's car. Berit: Tommy fuelled car; threatened her, left towards Malmö. Nilla: married 15 years, but Tommy loved Magdalena. Krister at Ebbe's farm, sees Magdalena drop into lake; Vera jumps in. Krister saves Vera. Divers recover Magdalena's corpse. Krister returns home; considers relocation to Stockholm.
5	"Episode 5" (Avsnitt 5)	Henrik Georgsson, Jens Jonsson	Björn Carlström, Pontus Edvinsson, Jimmy Nivrén Olsson, Stefan Thunberg, Anders de la Motte	13 November 2023
Flashback: Vera puts away shopping. Magdalena dances with Billy: her beloved child. Vera leaves for friend's house, Billy follows. Vera rebuffs Billy, who walks away. Present: Isak in cornfield, which provokes no memories. Vera takes Isak to Sailors house. Vera finds additional photos of Billy. Isak recalls being locked in bedroom; drew flower on wall. Krister attends AA session. Vera visits Mattias; she's confronted by Harald. Neither accepts Isak's story. Vera encounters Krister, who provides Billy's files. She shows "Sailor"'s extra photos. Krister: Harald coached all witnesses. Krister doubts Berits testimony: Tommy left town. Krister: more likely to be family member. Vera sees photo of Billy's sandal. Isak recognises Krister's voice from "Sailor"'s house. Mattias tracks Isak's van to rental company. Leon phones Vera: goodbye message. Vera directs emergency services to Leon's address. Vera confronts Berit for lying about Tommy's leaving town. Åsa to Mattias: do not know renter's name. Åsa alerts Isak: police investigating. Mattias updates Harald about Åsa. Vera, Isak drink together. DNA analysis: Isak and Billy are half-brothers. Vera to Isak: Magdalena always preferred Billy instead of her or Mattias. Vera: Harald may have hurt Tommy. Krister: Isak's Tommy's son, not Billy. Vera's wary of Isak, now.
6	"Episode 6" (Avsnitt 6)	Henrik Georgsson, Jens Jonsson	Björn Carlström, Stefan Thunberg, Anders de la Motte	20 November 2023
Vera returns to "Sailor"'s home; develops additional photos, which show Tommy, Magdalena and Billy. Mattias to Vera: DNA confirms Billy's Tommy's son. Flashback: Harald, Jeppson drag Tommy into building; torture Tommy using electric shocks. Tommy denies taking Billy. Harald repeats shocks, Tommy dies. Harald, Jeppson dispose of Tommy's corpse in concrete pour. Present: Isak demands Harald explain what happened to Tommy. Harald continues lying; Isak injures Harald, but leaves. Vera to Isak: Billy's relationship. Ruud: Leon attempted suicide, saved by Vera's call. Ruud berates Vera for continuing relationship. Vera visits Harald, shows photos. After Harald told Magdalena that Tommy would never return, she killed herself. Mattias cannot arrest Harald without tangible evidence. Cissi convinces Mattias to visit Ebbe. Flashback: Ebbe hears Magdalena, Tommy arguing; learns Billy's Tommy's son. Present: Vera, Ebbe dine. Vera remembers tying Billy's sneakers on him before he disappeared. Vera confronts Ebbe about Billy's sandal. Flashback: Ebbe enters home, finds Magdalena's suicide note. She lies in bathtub over Billy's corpse. Magdalena revives. Present: Ebbe collapses. Paramedics attend Ebbe. Police discover Billy's skeleton under rose bed. Vera reads Magdalena's note. Mattias tells Harald he believes Vera's version; shuns Harald thereafter. Billy's reburied with Magdalena. Vera relocates to Stockholm.
