= Tordo =

Tordo is a surname. Notable people with the surname include:

- Fernando Tordo (born 1948), Portuguese singer and composer
- Jean-François Tordo (born 1964), French rugby union player
- João Tordo (born 1975), Portuguese writer

== See also ==
- Tord
- Tormo
