= Tormo =

Tormo is a surname. Notable people with the surname include:

- Cristina García-Orcoyen Tormo (born 1948), Spanish politician and environmentalist
- Elías Tormo (1869–1957), Spanish art historian
- Ricardo Tormo (1952–1998), Spanish motorcycle road racer
- Sara Sorribes Tormo (born 1996), Spanish tennis player

== See also ==
- Tordo
- Tormod
