= Tau Zero =

1970 novel by Poul Anderson

- Cover of first edition (hardcover)
- Author: Poul Anderson
- Cover artist: Anita Siegel
- Language: English
- Genre: Science fiction
- Publisher: Doubleday
- Publication date: 1970
- Publication place: United States
- Media type: Print (hardback & paperback)
- Pages: 208
- ISBN: 1-56865-278-X
- OCLC: 37202159

Tau Zero is a hard science fiction novel by American writer Poul Anderson. The novel was based upon the short story "To Outlive Eternity" appearing in Galaxy Science Fiction in 1967. It was first published in book form in 1970. The book is a quintessential example of "hard sci-fi", as its plot is dominated by futuristic technology grounded in real physics principles. It was nominated for the Hugo Award for Best Novel in 1971.

== Plot ==
Tau Zero follows the crew of the starship Leonora Christine, a colonization vessel crewed by 25 men and 25 women aiming to reach the nearby star Beta Virginis. The ship is powered by a Bussard ramjet. This mode of propulsion is not capable of faster-than-light travel, and so the voyage is subject to relativity and time dilation: the crew will spend 5 years on board, whereas 33 years will pass on the Earth before they arrive at their destination. The ship accelerates at a modest constant rate for most of the first half of the journey, eventually achieving an appreciable percentage of the speed of light, and the goal is to decelerate at the same rate during the second half of the journey by reversing the ram scoop fields. However, the Leonora Christine passes through a small nebula before the half-way point, damaging the deceleration field generators. Since the Bussard engines must be kept running to provide particle/radiation shielding, and because of the hard radiation produced by the engines, the crew can neither repair the damage nor turn off their ramjet.

The text consists of narrative prose interspersed with paragraphs in which Anderson explains the scientific basis of relativity, time dilation, the ship's mechanics and details of the cosmos outside.

As there is no hope of completing the original mission, the crew increase acceleration even more; they need to leave the Milky Way altogether in order to reach a region where the local gas density, and the concomitant radiation hazard, are low enough that they can repair the decelerator. The ship's ever-increasing velocity brings the time dilation to extreme levels and takes the crew further and further away from any possibility of contact with humanity. The initial plan is to locate and land on a suitable planet in another galaxy. Millions of years would have passed since their departure, and in any case they would be millions of light years from Earth. However, they find the vacuum of intergalactic space insufficient for safety; they must instead travel to a region between superclusters of galaxies to make repairs. They do, but the extremely thinly spread matter is then too dispersed to use for deceleration. They must wait, flying free but essentially without the ability to change course, until they randomly encounter enough galactic matter to decelerate adequately to search for habitable planets. To make the waiting time shorter, they continue accelerating through the galaxy clusters they encounter, more and more closely approaching the speed of light with tau, or proper time, decreasing closer and closer to zero.

Throughout the story, Charles Reymont, the ship's Constable, fights to keep hope alive in the confined community and at the same time maintain order and discipline, sometimes at great emotional cost to himself. He explains his system to his partner Chi-Yuen Ai-Ling:

The human animal wants a father-mother image but, at the same time, resents being disciplined. You can get stability like this: The ultimate authority source is kept remote, god-like, practically unapproachable. Your immediate superior is a mean son-of-a-bitch who makes you toe the mark and whom you therefore detest. But his own superior is as kind and sympathetic as rank allows ... The end result is that Captain Telander's been isolated. His infallibility doesn't have to cope with essentially unfixable human messes ... I'm the traditional top sergeant. Hard, harsh, demanding, overbearing, inconsiderate, brutal. Not so bad as to start a petition for my removal. But enough to irritate, be disliked, although respected. That's good for the troops. It's healthier to be mad at me than to dwell on personal woes... [First Officer] Lindgren smooths things out. As first officer, she sustains my power. But she overrules me from time to time. She exercises her rank to bend regulations in favor of mercy. Therefore she adds benignity to the attributes of Ultimate Authority.

— Chapter 12

The storyline is similar to that of the long poem and later opera Aniara, in which the ship was unable to stop and doomed to travel endlessly, but Tau Zero has a more upbeat ending. By the time the ship is repaired, tau has decreased to less than a billionth and the crew experience "billion-year cycles which pass as moments". But by the time that they are ready to attempt to find a future home, they realize that the universe is approaching a Big Crunch (the Big Crunch was a leading theory of the fate of the universe at the time this book was written). The universe collapses (a process the starship survives because there is still enough uncondensed hydrogen for maneuvering outside the growing singularity) and then explodes in a new Big Bang. The voyagers then decelerate and finally disembark at a planet with a habitat suitably similar to Earth, on which the vegetation has a vivid bluish-green color.

== Prominent characters ==
- Ingrid Lindgren, Ship's First Officer – Swedish; she and Reymont had a relationship until he learned of her liaisons with Boris Federoff; she becomes the "face" of authority and the link between crew and passengers.
- Charles Reymont, Ship's Constable – Interplanetarian (i.e. no Earth-country citizenship, by choice), veteran of two previous interstellar flights; determined to maintain order and ensure survival in the face of disaster and hopelessness, he becomes the ship's de facto leader (although he defers to the ship's hierarchy).
- Boris Fedoroff, Ship's Chief Engineer – Russian
- Chi-Yuen Ai-Ling, Planetologist – Chinese; after Reymont's break-up with Ingrid, she and Reymont begin a long-term relationship.
- Lars Telander, Ship's Captain – Swedish; a devout Protestant and a strong leader, but the dangers, uncertainties and responsibilities piled on him following the disaster seem to slowly erode him.
- Johann Friewald, Machinist – German; a man of courage and good nature; after the disaster, he becomes Reymont's right-hand man in maintaining order and ensuring survival.
- Elof Nilsson, Astronomer – Swedish; a brilliant scientist, but arrogant, physically unattractive and completely lacking in social graces to the point where he is unable to maintain relationships with people; his relationship with Sadler quickly self-destructs, but later he and Ingrid begin a partnership.
- Jane Sadler, Bio-Technician – Canadian; after a brief relationship at the book's beginning and her failed relationship with Nilsson, she and Friewald become permanent partners.
- Emma Glassgold, Molecular Biologist – Nationality not stated, lived most of her life in Israel; apparently (though not specifically stated) a devout Christian; as the story develops, she develops a deep (but non-sexual) relationship with Norbert Williams.
- Norbert Williams, Chemist – American; brash and somewhat loud-mouthed and hot-headed, but capable of deep feeling (proved by his relationship with Emma Glassgold).

== Origin of the title ==
The novel's title is derived from the value of the time contraction factor Tau ($\tau$), where $\tau = \sqrt{1-v^2/c^2}$ where v is the velocity of the ship and c the speed of light. At a given velocity, the duration that is experienced on the non-accelerating Earth may be multiplied by tau to yield the duration experienced on board the ship. Therefore, as Anderson writes, "the closer that [the ship's velocity] comes to [the speed of light], the closer tau comes to zero", and the longer the time that passes outside the ship for a duration inside. The ship in the story intended to attain a tau of 0.015, but as they continue to accelerate beyond the original schedule, it decreases much further.

This usage of tau is somewhat idiosyncratic. In physics, tau is more usually used to represent the total elapsed time of the moving clock, so Anderson's "tau factor" is what would conventionally be written d$\tau$/dt. Physicists also prefer to use gamma (γ) to represent the Lorentz factor in time dilation, which in Anderson's terminology would be 1/$\tau$.

== Themes ==
The social themes in this book are much lighter than the scientific themes. The latter include everything from black matter, time dilation, the theory of relativity, and Big Crunch theory of the universe.

Reymont, the constable, regularly persists as a hyper-masculinized police officer, while first officer Ingrid basically acts as a buffer between Reymont and Captain Telander. These three characters are responsible for the majority of all decision-making on the ship, but Reymont is the only one who makes regular chapter-to-chapter appearances. In between these interactions, there are numerous romantic entanglements.

In the final, ending parts, much of the novel deals with the crewmembers' reactions to being the last remnants of humanity, and the prospect of being confined with their colleagues indefinitely. Though they were prepared to "lose" twenty Earth years during their journey and spend five on board the ship, the knowledge that they are being carried further and further into the future has various effects on the psychology of the characters. The novel describes the changing and extreme time dilation effects as well as events from the perspective of both the ship and an external observer.

Incidental to the main themes is the political situation on the Earth from which the protagonists set out: a future where the nations of the world entrusted Sweden with overseeing disarmament and found themselves living under the rule of the Swedish Empire. This sub-theme reflects the great interest which Anderson, an American of Danish origin, took in Scandinavian history and culture. In later parts of the book, characters compare their desperate situation to that of semi-mythical characters of Scandinavian legend, with the relevant poetry occasionally quoted. In addition, there is a fist fight between an American astronaut and a Swedish astronaut about who built the best empire, as well as other nationalistic rhetoric.

== See also ==
- Tau Zero Foundation – Successor to the NASA Breakthrough Propulsion Physics Program, named after Tau Zero
