= Julia Ragnarsson =

Swedish actress (born 1992)

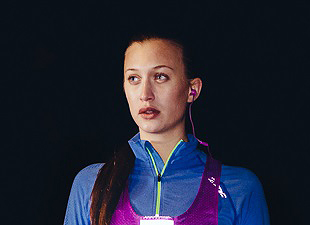
- Ragnarsson in March 2014
- Born: 30 July 1992 (age 33); Malmö, Sweden
- Occupation: Actress

Julia Maria Ragnarsson (born 30 July 1992) is a Swedish actress. She is the daughter of actor Lars-Göran Ragnarsson and stage-director Karin Ragnarsson. She studied at Heleneholms gymnasium in Malmö 2008-11. She has acted in several television series and films such as The Bridge, Maria Larssons eviga ögonblick, Stockholm Stories, and Tillbaka till Bromma (2014).

In 2016, she played the leading role as Olivia Rönning in the SVT crime series Springfloden.

== Filmography ==
- 2003 - Tur & retur - My
- 2006 - Wallander - Den svaga punkten - Johanna
- 2008 - Wallander - Sidetracked - Trafficking Victim
- 2008 - Maria Larssons eviga ögonblick - Anna Larsson
- 2012 - The Fear - Zana
- 2013 - The Bridge - Laura
- 2014 - Steppeulven
- 2014 - Stockholm Stories
- 2014 - Tillbaka till Bromma
- 2015 - In the Sea (short)
- 2016 - Min faster i Sarajevo
- 2016 - Spring Tide
- 2016 - Take down
- 2017 - Jakten på tidskristallen (TV-series) (Christmas Calendar)
- 2019 - Midsommar - Inga
- 2019, 2023 - Fartblinda (TV-series) - Bea Farkas
- 2024 - End of Summer - Vera
