= Aniara (film) =

- Theatrical release poster
- Directed by: Pella Kågerman; Hugo Lilja
- Screenplay by: Pella Kågerman; Hugo Lilja
- Based on: Aniara by Harry Martinson
- Produced by: Annika Rogell
- Starring: Emelie Jonsson
- Cinematography: Sophie Winqvist
- Edited by: Pella Kågerman; Björn Kessler; Michał Leszczyłowski
- Music by: Alexander Berg
- Production companies: Meta Film Stockholm; Unbranded Pictures; Viaplay; Film Capital Stockholm Fond; Gotlands Filmfond; Ljud & Bildmedia
- Distributed by: SF Studios (Sweden)
- Release dates: 7 September 2018 (TIFF); 1 February 2019 (Sweden)
- Running time: 106 minutes
- Countries: Sweden; Denmark
- Language: Swedish
- Budget: €1.9 million
- Box office: US$40,124

Aniara is a 2018 Swedish-Danish science fiction film directed and written by Pella Kågerman and Hugo Lilja. The film is an adaptation of the 1956 Swedish epic poem of the same name by Harry Martinson. The film is set in a dystopian future where Earth has been rendered uninhabitable, prompting mass migration from Earth to Mars. When one such routine trip veers off course, the passengers of the Aniara struggle to cope with their new lives.

The film premiered at the 2018 Toronto International Film Festival and was given a theatrical release in 2019 by Magnolia Pictures.

== Plot ==
Sometime in the future, Earth has been ravaged by pollution, natural disasters and rising sea levels, making it largely uninhabitable. A woman (Emelie Garbers) works on board the Aniara, a luxurious spaceship that takes passengers from Earth to Mars in three weeks. Her job involves working as a "Mimarobe" within the Mima, an artificial intelligence designed to evoke the viewers' experiences of Earth's lush, verdant past through a totally immersive virtual-reality experience that taps into the participants' memories and emotions.

In the first week of the Aniara's voyage, the ship suddenly veers off course to avoid a collision with space debris. Some of the debris pierces the hull and hits the ship's nuclear reactor, setting off an imminent meltdown and forcing the crew to eject all of the ship's fuel. This results in the ship having no navigational control, no propulsion, thus no ability to resume its original course. Captain Chefone promises the passengers and crew that they will be able to resume the trip to Mars once the ship passes a celestial body, which should happen in no more than two years. The Mimarobe's roommate, the ship's astronomer (Roberta), later reveals to her that this is a lie and that there is no possibility of resuming their course.

Soon, the Mimarobe finds her usually unimportant job becoming more popular and necessary than ever, as passengers use the Mima as an escape from their current situation. After three years, the Mima becomes one of the most important functions necessary to keep calm on board the ship. With so many people bringing their memories of Earth's decline to the Mima, as well as their anxieties surrounding the current situation on board the Aniara, the Mima becomes overwhelmed and self-destructs, dying by suicide. Though the Mimarobe had asked the captain for a month of rest for the Mima, she is blamed for the machine's malfunction and is imprisoned. Isagel, a pilot and the Mimarobe's lover, is also imprisoned following a physical conflict with Captain Chefone regarding the punishment of the Mimarobe.

By the fourth year, mass suicides and developing cults lead the Mimarobe and Isagel to be granted release and reassigned to work. They join a fertility cult dedicated to the Mima, and soon Isagel becomes pregnant after an orgy. She has depression during her pregnancy and is tempted to end the child's life after he is born. The Mimarobe wants to build a "beam-screen", a projection device acting as a mimic of Mima to alleviate Isagel's and the other passengers' depression, but Captain Chefone forbids her from doing so. He instead orders her to focus on educating the children, in hopes that one or more of them may discover a way to return them to Mars.

In the fifth year, Isagel and the astronomer discover that a probe large enough to feasibly contain fuel is travelling towards the Aniara, meaning that a rescue is possibly being attempted. The probe takes over a year to reach the ship, and upon being brought onto the ship in the sixth year, the crew quickly realize that they are unable to identify it, its origins or whether it contains fuel. The captain orders the crew to keep working on the probe, but they eventually lose hope of it being a means of rescue. The Astronomer laments that their ship is a sarcophagus, defying Captain Chefone's orders for the crew to keep a united front to prevent the passengers from losing hope. In a fit of rage, Captain Chefone shoots a taser at the Astronomer, killing her.

The Mimarobe begins work on her projection device, eventually succeeding in projecting a waterfall onto the dark windows of the spaceship. Having succeeded, she returns to her quarters only to discover that Isagel has killed herself and their son. Four years later, the few remaining crew celebrate the 10th anniversary of their voyage into space. While listlessly accepting an honorary medal from Captain Chefone for her creation of the beam-screen, the Mimarobe notices that his wrists are bandaged from a presumed suicide attempt. The algae tanks that the passengers rely on for food and oxygen have become contaminated.

In year 24 of the voyage, the Mimarobe and a few remaining survivors sit cross-legged in a dimly lit room. An unidentified woman in the group rhapsodizes about the divine power of sunlight on Earth, as the ship descends into a final darkness.

In year 5,981,407 of its voyage, the Aniara, derelict, frozen, and devoid of human life, reaches the Lyra constellation and drifts right past a planet as verdant and welcoming as Earth once was.

== Cast ==
- Emelie Garbers as the Mimarobe
- Bianca Cruzeiro as Isagel
- Arvin Kananian as Captain Chefone
- Anneli Martini as the Astronomer

== Production ==
The film was produced by Meta Film Stockholm. It received eight million kronor in production support from the Swedish Film Institute. Filming began on 31 October 2016 in Stockholm and Gotland. Filming locations in Stockholm included Stockholm Waterfront and the Sollentuna Centrum shopping mall, while Gotland was responsible for the studio scenes. Some scenes were also shot on a Viking Line cruise ship.

== Reception ==
Aniara received generally favorable reviews. On review aggregator Rotten Tomatoes it holds a score of 71% based on 51 reviews, with an average score of 7/10. The website's critics consensus reads: "Dazzling, but a little dull, ANIARA's impeccable production design is undermined by its underwhelming philosophical pondering." On Metacritic it holds a score of 61% based on 16 critics.

Norman Wilner of NOW Toronto says that the film "embraces the existential possibilities of sci-fi cinema". The Guardian, in two reviews, gave the film four stars, calling it a "stunning sci-fi eco parable" and an "eerily mesmerising outer-space odyssey" respectively. Flickering Myth characterizes Jonsson's Mimarobe as "complex and sensitive". Teo Bugbee at The New York Times characterized Aniara as "depressing", but also said that "the commitment to bleakness feels artistically admirable". Hollywood Reporter, on the other hand, said: "But while the themes are clear, drama is perilously missing."

Aniara won the "Asteroid" Prize for Best International Film at the 2019 Trieste Science+Fiction Festival.

The film took home four awards at the 2020 Swedish Guldbagge awards ceremony, including Best Actress in a leading role and Best Supporting Actress to Emelie Garbers (née Jonsson) and Bianca Cruzeiro respectively.
