= Tord =

Tord is a given name, derived from the elements 'thor' meaning thunder, thunder god; and 'fridr' meaning peace, beautiful, fair. The name developed as a short form of Thorfrid (Old Norse).

Notable people with the name include:

- Tord Andersson (born 1942), Swedish diver
- Tord Bernheim (1914–1992), Swedish film actor
- Tord Bonde (c. 1350s–1417), medieval Swedish magnate
- Tord Boontje (born 1968), Dutch industrial product designer
- Tord Filipsson (born 1950), Swedish former cyclist
- Tord Ganelius (1925–2016), Swedish mathematician
- Tord Asle Gjerdalen (born 1983), Norwegian cross-country skier
- Tord Godal (1909–2002), Norwegian theologian and bishop
- Tord Grip (born 1938), Swedish football coach and manager
- Tord Gustavsen (born 1970), Norwegian jazz pianist and composer
- Tord Göransson (1910–1997), Swedish diplomat
- Tord Hagen (1914–2008), Swedish diplomat and ambassador
- Tord Hall (1910–1987), Swedish mathematician
- Tord Henriksson (born 1965), Swedish triple jumper
- Tord Holmgren (born 1957), Swedish footballer
- Tord Johansson (1955–2015), Swedish businessman
- Tord Lien (born 1975), Norwegian politician
- Tord Linnerud (born 1974), Norwegian rallycross driver
- Tord Lundström (born 1945), Swedish professional ice hockey player
- Tord Magnuson (born 1941), Swedish business executive
- Tord Øverland Knudsen (born 1982), Norwegian musician
- Tord Palander (1902–1972), Swedish economist
- Tord Sahlén (born 1937), Swedish sprint canoer
- Tord Stål (1906–1972), Swedish film actor
- Tord Wiksten (born 1971), Swedish biathlete
