= Blinded (TV series) =

Swedish TV drama series (2019–2022)

- Also known as: Fartblinda
- Genre: Drama thriller
- Based on: Fartblinda by Carolina Neurath
- Screenplay by: Jesper Harrie, Jonas Bonnier, Maria Karlsson
- Directed by: Jens Jonsson, Johan Lundin
- Starring: Julia Ragnarsson; Matias Varela
- Music by: David Engellau, Uno Helmersson
- Country of origin: Sweden
- Original language: Swedish
- No. of seasons: 3
- No. of episodes: 22

Production
- Producers: Nils Tham; Lisa Dahlberg; Pontus Edgren; Martina Håkansson; Jan Marnell; Anette Mattsson
- Running time: 45 minutes

Original release
- Network: C More, TV4
- Release: 19 August 2019 – 23 April 2025

Blinded or Fartblinda is a Swedish television drama series, which was streamed via C More from 19 August 2019 and broadcast on TV4 from 2 September. It is based on the novel, Fartblinda (2016), by Swedish writer Carolina Neurath. The first season of eight episodes was directed by Jens Jonsson and Johan Lundin. Scripts were mostly written by Jesper Harrie, who was joined by Jonas Bonnier or Maria Karlsson for some episodes. It stars Julia Ragnarsson as Bea, a financial investigative reporter, and Matias Varela as Peder, a bank CEO. Meanwhile, Bea and the married Peder are having a clandestine affair. The second season, also with eight episodes, followed on 16 May 2022, which was directed by Jonsson and Lundin. Jonsson co-wrote scripts with Erik Hultkvist and they were joined by additional scriptwriters. Lead actors Ragnarsson and Varela reprised their roles. The third season of six episodes was streamed from 23 April 2025 and has Ragnarson joined by Maxwell Cunningham as Karim Abassi.

== Premise ==
Investigative journalist Bea discovers dubious practices in Stockholm's financial sector. There are contradictions between ST Bank's credit losses and those declared in its latest official quarterly report. That report claims the bank is completely solid with their recent financial performance exceeding expectations. Bea's situation is complicated by her clandestine affair with Peder, the married CEO of ST Bank. Peder is unwilling to publicly admit to any problems at his bank. Bea receives anonymous emails, which declare that the bank's losses are even higher than previously indicated. Bea learns that Peder has lied to the media, while she considers whether to reveal her lover's financial fraud.

== Cast and characters ==
- Julia Ragnarsson as Beatrice "Bea" Farkas (née Andersson): The Daily Post's financial journalist
- Matias Varela as Peder Rooth: ST Bank's CEO, Sophie's husband, Hampus and Hedda's father.
- Julia Dufvenius as Sophie Rooth (née Leijonhufud): writer, Peder's wife
- Albin Grenholm as Marcus Thulin: Bea's fellow financial journalist
- Vincent Wettergren as Hampus Rooth: Peder, Sophie's son
- Christian Wennberg as Bjarne Rasmussen: bank's CFO
- Lisette Pagler as Nina Vojnovic: newspaper's financial reporter
- Johan Hansson Kjellgren as Anders Rapp: newspaper's financial editor, Bea's boss
- Edvin Endre as Carl Rehnskiöld: Otto's son, has cerebral palsy
- Claes Månsson as Otto Rehnskiöld: bank's chairman, hunting club member
- Gabriella Repic as Eszti Farkas: Bea's grandmother
- Filip Wolfe Sjunnesson as Pierre Eckervik
- Martin Eliasson as Jon-Andreas "JA": newspaper's IT expert
- Vera Vaindorf as Hedda Rooth: Peder, Sophie's daughter
- Peter Eggers as Ulf Klingspor: bank's Private Banking manager, Peder's rival
- Urban Bergsten as Fotografen (English: Photographer) Björn: newspaper's photographer
- Robert Sjöblom as Sven-Ivan Segerfält: financier, Otto's rival, hunting club member
- Gabriella Boris as Anne Bystedt: rival bank's CEO

=== Season one only ===
- Oskar Thunberg as Henrik Beijer: bank's Trading manager, hedge fund expert
- Björn Elgerd as Adam Berg: bank employee, Henrik's underling, Bea's former classmate
- Victor von Schirach as Robin Lesse: bank's archivist
- Ania Chorabik as Eleonor Björnor: bank's Communications Director
- Arvin Kananian as Nico Karamanlis: bank's Trading deputy manager
- Philip Oros as Herdi Kader: bank's Trading employee, Adam's co-worker
- Mats Blomgren as Sten Waltin: Otto's henchman
- Christel Elsayah as Irene Lindh: Bea's confidante
- Kajsa Ernst as Birgitta Kerchinsky: bank's Governance, Risk, Compliance manager
- Annica Liljeblad as Marianne Rehnskiöld: Otto's wife, Carl's mother
- Claes Ljungmark as Torbjörn Ask: Financial Supervisory Authority (FSA) chief investigator
- Johannes Kuhnke as Leo Stiger: nurse, Adam's boyfriend
- Sebastian Karlsson as Jocke
- Anna Sise as Rebecka Klingspor: Ulf's wife, Sophie's friend
- Björn Andersson as Martin Cassel: financier, Sven-Ivan's rival, hunting club member
- Yohanna Idha as Amanda Karlsson: casino croupier, drug-dealer, Henrik's sometime girlfriend
- Emilia Roosmann as Polina: Sven-Ivan's latest girlfriend
- Tobias Cronwall as Broman: Martin's henchman
- Kalled Mustonen as Totte: homeless man, who sleeps rough outside Bea's building

=== Season two only ===
- Ane Dahl Torp as Susanne Jonsson
- Peter Gantzler as Aksel Bonnesen
- Maja Kin as Christina Rasmussen
- Rosemarie Mosbæk as Louise Bonnesen
- Klas Wiljergård as Klas Ygren
- Alex Fatehnia as Bodyguard Enzo
- Celie Sparre as Viktoria Lindén
- Sovi Rydén as Aksel's female assistant
- Francisco Sobrado as Carlos
- Siham Shurafa as Amina Farshid
- Dejmis Rustom Bustos as Saeed Roozbahani
- Balder Ljunggren as Jonas Jonsson
- Anna Hallgren as Malin Sandqvist

== Production ==
Blinded (in international markets) or Fartblinda (in Sweden), is based on the 2016 novel Fartblinda by Swedish financial journalist and writer Carolina Neurath. It is a fictional story, which was inspired by actual events. In 2010 a financial scandal affected the Swedish private HQ Bank, which lost billions in Swedish krona in securities trading and concealed those losses in its reports, having previously been named Sweden's best private bank.

Filming rights were purchased by the production company FLX. Jens Jonsson and Johan Lundin were employed as directors for individual episodes. The screenplay, based on Neurath's book, was mostly written by writer Jesper Harrie together with Maria Karlsson and Jonas Bonnier assisting on some episodes. The first season's filming began in late 2018. Starring roles for Julia Ragnarsson as Bea and Matias Varela as Peder were confirmed in October 2018. On 19 August 2019, the series started on the Swedish streaming service C More and on 2 September 2019 on TV4. Filming for the second season began in mid-2021, with Rangnarsson and Varela reprising their roles, its episodes premiered in May 2022 on C More. A German dubbed version of the first season was broadcast on pay-TV channel, Sat.1 Emotions from 23 March 2020. German free-TV channel, One broadcast season one from 9 March 2021. The second season followed in Germany on 18 July 2022.

== Episode guide ==
=== Season one ===
No. overall	No. in season	Title	Directed by	Written by	Original release date
1	1	"Quarterly Report" (Q3)	Jens Jonsson	Jesper Harrie, Carolina Neurath	19 August 2019
Mob enters after doors forced open. Bankers begin fighting. Peder looks outside. 23 days earlier: Bea researches pension fund Aion's customers. She prepares lobster for dinner, but her date renegs. Peder exercises, Sophie readies children. Anders praises Marcus's latest article; assigns Bea to bank's quarterly report. Bank employees vie for more hedge funding. Henrik to Peder: situation's bad. Peder: report claims we are doing better. Henrik: risky investments pay for bonuses. Bea, Peder have sex. Peder returns home. Henrik parties, has sex with Amanda. At press conference, Peder defends report's exaggerated claims. Bea interviews Peder; queries bank's low credit losses. Peder: only taking calculated risks. Bea encounters Adam. Otto congratulates Peder's presentation. Peder to employees: bonuses are due. Birgitta concerned about Peder withholding market information. Bea posts article on bank's credit losses. Peder refuses bank's convertible notes. Eszti advises Bea to stop Peder affair. Sophie checks Peder's contacts: notices "BF"; reads Birgitta's message. Anonymous email to Bea: Peder's lying about credit losses. JA too busy to check sender. Torbjörn to Bea: not investigating ST Bank; sends latest review. Irene: email could be hoax. Bea hands over bank research to Marcus. Peder to Bea: I never lie to you. JA: emailer uses bank's server.
2	2	"The Betrayal" (MMV)	Jens Jonsson	Jonas Bonnier, Jesper Harrie, Carolina Neurath	19 August 2019
Sven pays Marcus for negatives articles on rivals. Birgitta: Trading's risks too great; Peder disagrees. JA, Bea contact emailer. Bea to Peder: Anders wants positive article. Otto suggests Peder prepare to take over chairmanship. Peder invites Bea to Maldives' holiday; proposes marriage. Sophie checks Peders laptop, phone: sees Maldives' holiday, "BF". Bjarne to Bea: honest relationships with employees, customers. Bea requests Trading's history; Bjarne obfuscates. Sophie asks Peder about Maldives, "BF" as they attend Marianne's party. Drunken Carl, praises Marianne's long-term marriage to Otto. Sophie's speech applauds their faithfulness. Peder does not answer Sophie. Marcus advises Bea to find bank employee, not polished by management. Adam presents investment to Trading. Bea questions Adam about bank. Adam, Herdi consult Peder, who lies: bank's convertible notes are completely secure. Bea surmises emailer is Birgitta. Bea confronts Birgitta, who walks off. Marcus and Martin discuss bribes to write articles. Peder berates Bea for believing unsubstantiated rumours about bank; he denies they are hiding anything. Peder to Sophie: Eleonor's infatuated with him. He denies affair with Bea; claims Maldives' holiday is for family. Bea and Anders argue over Birgitta's interview: Anders fires Bea. Martin's henchman beats Marcus. Martin orders Marcus to payback bribes within ten days.
3	3	"All In" (Allt i)	Jens Jonsson	Jesper Harrie, Carolina Neurath	27 August 2019
Bea joins Henrik gambling in casino. He refuses to explain Trading's operations. Adam uses Leo's apartment as collateral to get loan to buy more convertible notes. Sven ignores Marcus's plea for assistance with Martin. Peder, Henrik, Eleonor discuss bank's leaker; they surmise its Birgitta. Marcus returns bank's files to Bea. Otto suggests raising Henrik's limit, which Peder argues against, but accedes to. Marcus tries recovering his investment money, but his partner's unwilling to buy Marcus out. Marcus misdirects Bea's attention to bank's Estonian business loans. Sophie has trouble resuming her writing. After limit is lifted, Henrik encourages Trading's team to take greater risks. Bea and Peder almost break up, but have sex instead. Peder coerces Birgitta into resigning. Henrik wins at gambling. JA tells Bea: emailer sent number code, which leads to Birgitta. Bea consoles Birgitta over her "resigning". Birgitta redirects Bea to Trading's archives. Henrik exceeds Trading's limit; their speculation is initially successful. Bea asks Adam for help; Adam agrees provided he redeems convertible notes, first. Adam requests Trading history from Robin. When Robin's called away, Adam copies Trading history's files, which he hands to Bea. Peder promises to pay Marcus for misdirecting Bea.
4	4	"Farkas" (Farkas)	Johan Lundin	Jesper Harrie, Maria Karlsson, Carolina Neurath	2 September 2019
Peder berates Hampus for demeaning Totte. Peder learns Henrik exceeded his limit. Bea studies Trading's files. Bea confides in Marcus about Peder's fraud, and affair. Otto learns Carl's friend is Adam. Peder asks Otto to fire Henrik, but Otto foists blame onto Peder. Otto supervises Peder, Henrik's reconciliation. Henrik's limit's lowered. Bea recalls meeting Peder. Marcus updates Peder on Bea's Trading files: she's using insider. Bea blackmails her former professor, Mats into investigating bank's Trading. Peder tells Eleonor about Bea; suspected leaker: Adam. Eleonor's outraged about Bea being Peder's lover, Peder confiding in Marcus. Rebecka hears Sophie's complaints about Peder. Rebecka describes bank's financial troubles. Adam to Bea: Eleonor suspects. Broman punches Marcus, Martin gives Marcus two more days. Hampus apologises to beggar. Sophie disbelieves Peder's assurance that bank's finances are okay; she's concerned about their joint assets: Peder hangs up. Mats determines bank has two billion in hidden debt. As Bea enters her building, hooded man descends. Her flat's vandalised. Hooded man runs to car, which drives off. She reports vandals to police. Peder denies being behind vandals. Peder orders Marcus to sabotage Bea. Marcus reads Bea's draft article. Marcus threatens to reveal Bea's affair if she attempts to print.
5	5	"Hunt" (Jakten)	Johan Lundin	Jesper Harrie, Carolina Neurath	16 September 2019
Bea castigates Peder for subverting Marcus, Sophie listens. Bea alerts Adam: redeem convertible notes. Anders refuses Bea's story. Bjarne agrees to redeem Adam's notes. Robin to Peder, Eleonor: Adam was at archive computer. Bea sneaks into newspaper's offices, Nina logs in for her. Bea posts bank story; emails article to Torbjörn. Peder revokes Marcus's deal. Torbjörn raids bank's offices. Bea to Anders: FSA's investigating bank. Senior editor rehires Bea. Peder confronts Torbjörn: newspaper retracted story. Eleonor: it's back up plus more. Otto: situation's difficult, but hold fast. Peder: admit Trading's problems, which will be divested. Otto: follow Peder's proposal; stop redeeming convertible notes. Otto to Peder: scapegoat Henrik. Birgitta to Bea: Peder, Otto just as culpable. Adam confronts Bea: been fired, criminal charges, cannot redeem notes. Marcus hides out. Peder signs assets to Sophie; denies Bea affair. Torbjörn to government minister: facing 10 billion budget loss if bank collapses. Broman starts beating Marcus. Henrik's ex-wife removes their child. Peder, Sophie attend hunting club's party. Sophie meets Polina. Bea asks Henrik to refute bank's version, but Henrik makes a pass. Sophie's speech embarrasses Sven, Peder. FSA boss to Peder, Otto: revoking bank's licence. Peder: will find new owners. Someone saves Marcus.
6	6	"48 Hours" (48 timmar)	Johan Lundin	Jesper Harrie, Carolina Neurath	16 September 2019
Emailer to AJ, Bea: go to FSA. Torbjörn tells Bea about bank's deal. Peder: must find buyer within 48 hours. Bea informs Anders, who requires another source for verification. Peder phoning prospective buyers. Sven confirms bank's sale; Bea's story's published. Peder favours Arab consortium. Herdi learns Peder bought no new notes. Peder leads press conference: blames Henrik for irregularities, scolds FSA their treatment, concedes they are searching for new owner. Otto insults Bea. Leo, Adam argue; Adam confesses to losing Leo's savings as well. Otto to Peder: Sven's bank has offer, which is too low. Amanda discovers Henrik's having panic attack. Herdi to Adam: Peder lied about notes' being secure. Bea, Björn enter building opposite bank, ask resident to photograph bank. Adam confronts Peder about lying. Adam's herded away. Otto refuses to redeem employees' notes. Bjarne: Arab's offer requires FSA approval. Ulf gone from bank. Sven offers Ulf: pay off his notes, hire his department's employees. Björn starts photographing bankers. FSA approves bank purchase. Eleonor: Ulf's joined Sven, taking his employees. Other bank employees prevent them leaving. They break down doors to Ulf's department. Ulf runs off. Herdi looks for Adam, who has hanged himself. Bea collapses in remorse.
7	7	"Dismissal" (Avsked)	Jens Jonsson	Jonas Bonnier, Jesper Harrie, Carolina Neurath	23 September 2019
Peder reads Bea's article on banker's rioting. Liquidator determines bank's assets. Peder confirms affair with Bea. Sophie's unsure of their future. Police detain Peder. Peder: Henrik's responsible; Otto blames Henrik. Otto warns Peder: they will get you. Chief editor praises Bea's work. Henrik to investigator: management knew, check weekly reports to Peder. Peder asks Robin to collect Henrik's reports. Henrik refuses to verify falsified reports. Nico to Henrik: paid to lie about reports. Henrik: recorded Peder encouraging Trading's practices. Henrik: job at New York bank. Bea attends Adam's funeral. Peder offers condolences; Leo spits at Peder. Bea, Peder have sex. Bea to Anders: leaving journalism. Henrik contacts Bea. Otto to Carl: failed as bank's chairman. Carl rebuffs Otto; wants dignified life. Peder arrives home; Ulf waits in driveway. Sophie, Rebecka chat inside. Peder berates Rebecka as Ulf sabotaged bank's sale. Rebecka leaves, Peder follows. Peder, Ulf struggle. Henrik to Bea: Peder, Otto knew Trading's operations via weekly reports. Bea refuses Henrik overseeing her writing. Carl overhears Otto instructing Sten: get Henrik's recording. Police received bank's falsified reports. Sten punches Henrik; collects Henrik's phone. They fight; Sten kills Henrik. Peder, Sophie separate; Sophie takes children. Nina: Henrik killed himself.
8	8	"Elephants" (Elefanterna)	Jens Jonsson	Jesper Harrie, Carolina Neurath	30 September 2019
Henrik supposedly jumped from balcony. Henrik's ex-wife, Jenny: not suicidal. Nico to Bea: Henrik's drug dealer was Amanda. Amanda to Bea: Henrik had New York bank job; Peder changed Henrik's reports. Amanda: Henrik had recording. Otto informs Peder about Bea's investigation. Anders: Marcus quit job. Marcus hides in Riga; recalls escaping Broman. Bea, JA send email to leaker; Carl reads email. Otto reconciles with Carl; passes over heirloom. Sven buys bank from liquidator. Otto to Bea: Sven saved money by waiting for liquidation. Otto refuses to discuss Trading's reports. Otto to Sten: find out who talked. Bea searches Henrik's flat: discovers recording. Bea plays recording for Peder. Peder: ask Otto about falsified reports. Peder to Otto: Bea has Henrik's recording. Peder drives away; Otto nods to Sten. Sten confronts Bea at gunpoint. Peder arrives at Bea's. Tolle to Peder: man entered. Sten forces Bea to swallow pills; tries drowning her in bathtub. Peder, Tolle break into Bea's flat. Sten looks for intruder. Peder fights Sten. Bea stabs Sten, who collapses. Bea interviews Peder about bank's failure. Sten claims: Otto not involved. Ulf celebrates Sven's bank's exceeding expectations. Peder sentenced to year in prison. Bea to investigate new business venture, Kritan.

=== Season two ===
No. overall	No. in season	Title	Directed by	Written by	Original release date
9	1	"Easy" (Lätt)	Jens Jonsson	Jens Jonsson, Erik Hultkvist	16 May 2022
10	2	"Dilemma" (Dilemmat)	Jens Jonsson, Johan Lundin	Jens Jonsson, Erik Hultkvist, Charlotte Lesche	16 May 2022
11	3	"Malta" (Malta)	Jens Jonsson	Jens Jonsson, Erik Hultkvist, Maria Nygren	23 May 2022
12	4	"Manoeuvre" (Manöver)	Jens Jonsson	Jens Jonsson, Erik Hultkvist, Inger Scharis	30 May 2022
13	5	"Caught" (Fångad)	Jens Jonsson, Johan Lundin	Jens Jonsson, Erik Hultkvist, Inger Scharis	6 June 2022
14	6	"Kidnapping" (Kidnappningen)	Jens Jonsson, Johan Lundin	Jens Jonsson, Erik Hultkvist, Maria Nygren	13 June 2022
15	7	"Unmasking" (Demaskeringen)	Jens Jonsson	Jens Jonsson, Erik Hultkvist, Charlotte Lesche	20 June 2022
16	8	"Publication" (Publikationen)	Jens Jonsson, Johan Lundin	Jens Jonsson, Erik Hultkvist	27 June 2022
