= Spring Tide (TV series) =

- Also known as: Springfloden
- Genre: Drama
- Created by: Cilla Börjlind and Rolf Börjlind
- Based on: Springfloden (2012)
- Written by: Cilla Börjlind; Rolf Börjlind
- Directed by: Mattias Ohlsson; Niklas Ohlson
- Starring: Julia Ragnarsson; Kjell Bergqvist
- Composer: Johan Söderqvist
- Country of origin: Sweden
- Original language: Swedish
- No. of seasons: 2
- No. of episodes: 20

Production
- Executive producers: Lars Blomgren; Christian Wikander; Wolfgang Feindt; Peter Nadermann; Alexander Vandeputte; Jan De Clercq
- Producers: Martin Cronström; Francy Suntinger
- Production company: SVT Drama

Original release
- Network: SVT1
- Release: 6 March – 15 May 2016

Spring Tide (Swedish: Springfloden) is a Swedish television drama series. It had its premiere on 6 March 2016 on SVT. It was written by Rolf and Cilla Börjlind and is based on their crime novel of the same name published in 2012.

The two leads are played by Kjell Bergqvist (Tom Stilton) and Julia Ragnarsson (Olivia Rönning). Bergqvist won a Kristallen award for "Best Male Actor in a Television Series".

The second series premiered in September 2018.

== Plot ==
Season 1 – In August 1990, the sadistic murder of a pregnant woman is committed on the island of Nordkoster, western Sweden. The victim is buried alive in the sand, so that the rising tide slowly drowns her. In June 2015, the murder, known as the Beach Case (Swedish: Strandfallet) remains unsolved. Olivia Rönning, a trainee at the Stockholm Police Academy, is assigned the cold case for a summer project. Upon discovering that her late father worked on the original case, Olivia becomes obsessed with solving the murder. She searches for the lead investigator Tom Stilton, who has since become homeless and does not want to be reminded of his old life. Horrifying videos show up on the Internet in which other homeless people are brutally attacked including a friend of Tom's. Eventually Tom helps Olivia to investigate the murder. Along the way they are helped by Tom's former colleague, Mette Olsäter and their mutual friend Abbas el Fassi. They are thwarted by Rune Forss, a corrupt policeman and by Jackie Berglund, a former prostitute, madame and current store owner.

Season 2 – In late 2017 Olivia's near neighbour, Bengt Sahlman, is found hanging in his home by his teenage daughter, Sandra. He was a Customs officer. Meanwhile in Marseilles, Samira Khalil's dismembered body is discarded at the shoreline. She was a blind actress and former circus performer. Abbas loved Samira but she was then-married and so he left the city. Olivia has completed her final year at the academy but not yet chosen a posting. She decides to unofficially investigate Bengt's death, while Tom and Abbas go to Marseilles to find out about Samira. Mette and her team believe Bengt's death is related to missing drugs at Customs. Samira's murder leads to the local underworld of prostitution and porn films. First Tom then Abbas return to Stockholm leaving local police to look for the murder suspect, Alain Bressant. In Stockholm Olivia teams with TV investigative journalist, Alex Popov. They pursue Jean Borrel, the owner of Albion, which recommended a dangerous medicine to aged care homes, leading to deaths that were covered up; including that of Bengt's father. Eventually both Bengt's and Samira's murders are linked by evidence found on a laptop.

== Cast ==
- Julia Ragnarsson as Olivia Rönning, a police academy trainee, she researches the Beach Case from 25 years earlier. Her late father, Arne Rönning (1955–2011), had been a police investigator on that case.
  - Olivia has now completed her training, taken 6 months holiday and returned to help a near neighbour Sandra Sahlman after she sees her father, Bengt, hanging dead in their home.
- Kjell Bergqvist as Tom "Jelle" Stilton, a former police detective, who led the Beach Case. As Jelle, he is homeless on the streets of Stockholm. He does not want to return to his old life.
  - Living on an inherited property on the Stockholm Archipelago, he is asked by Abbas to help investigate the murder of his former girlfriend in Marseilles.
- Jessica Zandén as Maria Rönning, Olivia's mother.
  - Olivia blames her for not being told about being adopted. Maria has a new boyfriend.
- Dag Malmberg as Nils Wendt. Founder of MWM, mining company, disappeared from Stockholm 27 years ago. As Dan Nilsson, lived in Mexico and then Costa Rica. Returns to Sweden in June 2015. Dead.
- Cecilia Nilsson as Mette Olsäter, detective police commissioner, Tom's former colleague.
  - Her health results in cardiac problems. Temporarily replaced by Rune.
- Anna Wallander as Vera Larsson, homeless woman, lives in an abandoned caravan, Jelle's friend. Dead.
- Björn Andrésen as Benseman, homeless man, former librarian, Jelle's friend, hospitalised by two thugs.
- Gustav Lindh as Liam Olsson, thug, bashes homeless people, former cage fighter, recruits Acke.
- Dakota Williams as Adam Sharew, thug, former cage fighter, Liam's offsider.
- Josefin Iziamo as Muriel, homeless woman, drug addict, Jelle's friend.
  - Does not continue rehab, now on new illegal drug: 5-IT.
- Johan Widerberg as "Minken" Minqvist, petty criminal, Tom's ex-snitch.
  - Loan sharks threaten to harm him as he tries to evade paying. Tries to get Tom involved in his schemes.
- Kjell Wilhelmsen as Rune Forss, police detective with shady criminal associates. Professional rival with mutual dislike for Tom.
  - Promoted above Mette in her division. He tries to get rid of her. Arrests Tom and withholds medications.
- Stefan Gödicke as Janne Klinga, Rune's police colleague.
- Dar Salim as Abbas el Fassi, a former knife thrower, assists Mette, Tom's friend.
  - Returns to Marseilles, his hometown to investigate the murder of his former lover, Samira.
- Michael Segerström as Mårten Olsäter, a child psychologist, Mette's husband.
  - Helps Sandra deal with her grief after her father was killed.
- Helena Bergström as Linn Magnusson, CEO of MWM. Troubled by phone calls from Dan. Dead.
- Malena Engström as Ovette Andersson, prostitute, Minken's friend.
  - Formerly employed by Jackie but discarded after becoming pregnant to a client.
- Leonard Heinemann as Acke Andersson, school student, Ovette's son, starts working as a cage fighter.
- Görel Crona as Jackie Berglund, shop owner, former prostitute then pimp.
  - Investigated for her client list, which includes Rune.
- Angela Kovács as Eva Carlsén, social psychologist, author.
- Paloma Winneth as Beach Case murder victim.
- Michaela Thorsén as Lisa Edkvist, police detective sergeant, Mette's squad.
  - Rune wants her to replace Mette.
- Arvin Kananian as Bo "Bosse" Thyrén, police detective, Mette's squad.
- Frida Röhl as ”obducent” the pathologist.

Season 2 only

- Saga Samuelsson as Sandra Sahlman, secondary school student, near neighbour of Olivia's mother, finds her father hanged in her home. Has trouble coping with her grief, befriends Olivia, seeks help from Mårten.
- Nemanja Stojanovic as Alex Popovic, a TV investigative journalist, works with Olivia to detect a link between untimely deaths at an aged care home.
- Mårten Klingberg as Jean Borell, owner of Albion, which contracts for aged care homes, covers up deaths at Silvergåarden after recommending a faulty medication.
- Alexandra Rapaport as Charlotte Pram, a flight attendant, Sandra's aunt, takes custody after Bengt's death.
- Marie Berto as Michelle Fabre, Marseilles-based police chief, investigates Samira's death. Known to Tom from his police days.
- Reine Brynolfsson as Magnus Thorhed, Jean's enforcer, cleans up after him.
- Amanda Ooms as Luna Johansson, barge owner, rents a cabin to Tom.
- Anna Bjelkerud as Margit Welin, runs one of Albion's aged care homes, sometime-lover of Magnus.
- Siham Shurafa as Samira Khalil, blind woman, former circus performer, singer, actress. Abbas' former lover. Later a prostitute and porn star. Murdered and dismembered in Marseilles. Also as Nidal Khalil, Samira's older sister.
- Robin Stegmar as Thomas Welander, vicar, close friend of Bengt and Charlotte. Helps look after Sandra.
- Cecilia Frode as Gabriella Forsman, Customs agent, worked with Bengt.
- Nicky Naudé as Alain Bressant, Marseilles gigolo.
- Jonas Sjöqvist as Bengt Sahlman, Customs officer, found hanged in his home. Sandra's father.
- Rebecka Teper as Ann Gunberg, councillor, charmed by Jean to grant lucrative aged care contracts.
- Jean-Yves Tual as Pujol, former circus clown, Samira's friend.
- Anna Tulestedt as Marie Densrup, former circus contortionist, Samira's friend.
- Mark Grosy as Philippe Martiin, pimp, pornographer and drug lord, duped Samira into working for him.
- Najeh Hrichi as Josef, Philippe's henchman, bashes Pujol.

== Episodes ==
=== Series 1 (2016) ===
No.	Title	Directed by	Written by	Original release date
1	"Episode 1"	Niklas Ohlson, Mattias Ohlsson	Cilla Börjlind, Rolf Börjlind	6 March 2016
In August 1990 an unknown pregnant woman is buried up to the shoulders as the spring tide comes in to drown her. She screams for help but is ignored. Almost 25 years later in June 2015 Olivia, a police academy student, is given the unsolved Beach Case murder as a summer project: what could modern technology determine? Her deceased father, Arne, was a police investigator on the case and became fascinated by it. The victim was never identified and no motive was established. Olivia recovers her father's notes and then tries to find former lead investigator, Tom, but he became homeless. His homeless friends are being bashed by two youths, Liam and Adam, who post Internet videos of their work. Policeman Rune is uninterested in looking for the culprits as he believes homeless people are unreliable drug and alcohol addicts. In Costa Rica a Swedish man, Dan, gives his friend a bag to hold in case he does not return by July. Olivia contacts current chief detective, Mette, who does not know Tom's whereabouts. One of Tom's friends, Vera lives in an abandoned caravan on council land. Tom, Vera and others, sell street press magazines at a plaza.
2	"Episode 2"	Niklas Ohlson, Mattias Ohlsson	Cilla Börjlind, Rolf Börjlind	13 March 2016
Dan arrives in Sweden. Olivia surmises Tom is homeless and asks at a shelter/street magazine office. When Tom collects his next batch he is told, but is not interested. Olivia goes to the murder site, Nordkoster. She asks locals about the Beach Case and learns that a former prostitute, Jackie was living nearby. She sees Dan at the beach and takes a video. He later asks to use her phone to call a water taxi. Vera visits an attack victim, Benseman, in hospital. She asks Tom to walk her home as she is afraid due to the bashings. At Maria's home Olivia sees one of Arne's books, which describes escort services and has a photo and description of Jackie. It was written by Eva. Vera and Tom share meals and have sex. Liam and Adam film them through the window. Dan plays an audio recording of 1987 conversation with Linn, a mining company CEO. Linn identifies him as Nils, the missing founder of the company and is disturbed by the audio. While Tom is out buying food Adam enters the caravan and bashes Vera while Liam films.
3	"Episode 3"	Niklas Ohlson, Mattias Ohlsson	Cilla Börjlind, Rolf Börjlind	20 March 2016
Tom phones for help for Vera but hides from the ambulance. Olivia meets Eva to learn more about Jackie. Nils phones Linn again and plays more audiotape. Rune is unwilling to investigating bashings: preferring to wait for one to die to gain greater notoriety. Eva sends Olivia a video interview with Jackie about escort services and her client list. Linn tells her enforcer Alexander about Nils' audio: it must be found or they will be ruined. Benseman tells Tom that Vera died. Olivia revisits Eva and sees a photo of her with younger brother Servker. Eva tells how Jackie runs a boutique and had worked with a porn king, Carl. When Olivia visits Carl in a nursing home he feigns dementia and then phones Jackie to warn her. Eva is attacked in her home by a masked man. Liam posts the video of Vera's bashing. Tom moves into Vera's caravan while Olivia returns to the magazine office. She learns he sells at the plaza and sees him. Initially he does not want to talk to her. Tom calls up a former snitch, Minken to help find Vera's killers. Nils phones Linn and describes her outfit.
4	"Episode 4"	Niklas Ohlson, Mattias Ohlsson	Cilla Börjlind, Rolf Börjlind	3 April 2016
Alexander advises Linn to sponsor a children's hospital in Congo as a PR stunt to divert attention from the company's use of child labour. She tells Alexander that Nils is in Stockholm and must be found. Tom looks closely at a video and notices the thug has a tattoo of CF, meaning they are cage fighters. Liam and Adam round up young boys, including 10-year-old Acke and take them to an underground venue to fight. Acke raises money so his mother, Ovette, no longer prostitutes herself. She confides in Minken about Acke's bruises. Acke tells him about cage fighting. Tom is told by Minken where the next fight is. Olivia takes a photo of Jackie in her store and then enters. Jackie recognises her. Maria wants Olivia to cut down time spent on the Beach Case as she is obsessing. Tom goes to the fight venue but is spotted by Liam and Adam, who beat him. Tom phones Minken for help, meanwhile Olivia phones Tom but Minken answers and asks her to provide first aid. Nils meets Linn, gives her a copy of the audiotape and threatens to take revenge. Olivia returns home and is attacked.
5	"Episode 5"	Niklas Ohlson, Mattias Ohlsson	Cilla Börjlind, Rolf Börjlind	10 April 2016
Nils is drowned in a submerged car. Mette investigates and recognises him. Olivia's cat is missing after her attack. Linn's audiotape discusses having an innocent man killed. Liam's next posting is Tom's beating. Minken visits the caravan with food and is asked to contact Acke again. Jackie is told about Olivia digging into her business and the murder victim. Olivia's car has trouble, she lifts the bonnet: her cat is cooked. She drives to Jackie's shop and smacks her. Linn discusses Nils recent death with husband, Bertil and says Nils disappeared in 1987 after stealing 2 million. Olivia sees the news report and recognises Dan. Fellow homeless ask Tom to find who is bashing them. Mette asks Linn about Nils but she denies any recent contact. Tom and Olivia go to Mette's home to show her the video of Nils. They talk about the bashings and cage fighters. Mette tells them Rune is investigating the bashings but Tom refuses to work with him. Jackie and Rune confer on Olivia and Tom asking about her. Ove, the murder witness, had met Dan in Costa Rica and talked about the murder. Ove remembers a clip with hair from the scene.
6	"Episode 6"	Niklas Ohlson, Mattias Ohlsson	Cilla Börjlind, Rolf Börjlind	17 April 2016
Mette asks Abbas to go to Costa Rica to research Nils life as Dan. Abbas is an expert knife thrower, from Marseilles, friend of both Tom and Mette. Nils' recovered phone shows calls to Linn's number. Ove meets Olivia and gives her the murder scene hair clip, in turn she gives it to Tom who asks his ex-wife and forensic examiner Marianne to analyse its DNA. Linn is questioned about Nils' calls but claims they were silent or her venting at the caller. Rune and Janne search the cage fight venue and Rune tackles Liam and Adam who fend him off and run away. The thugs suspect Acke of ratting them out. Janne visits Tom in Vera's caravan, who tells him the attackers are likely following victims from the plaza where they sell magazines. Abbas travels to Dan's home in Malpais, Costa Rica where he is attacked by two local criminals. He defends himself and kills both. Abbas goes to nearby Santa Teresa's bar where he sees an old photo stuck on a post: its Nils with the murder victim. He asks the attendant about the photo and she directs him to former owner, Bosques.
7	"Episode 7"	Niklas Ohlson, Mattias Ohlsson	Cilla Börjlind, Rolf Börjlind	24 April 2016
Abbas phones Mette: Nils knew the Beach Case victim. Basques identifies her as Adelita Rivera, Dan's Mexican girlfriend. They were expecting when she left for Sweden. Dan became inconsolable when she did not return. Recently Dan returned to Sweden and left a bag behind. Basques is told Dan was murdered and gives the bag to Abbas. Tom and Olivia learn it is not the victim's hair clip DNA. He draws a distinctive earring found in the victim's coat but not hers (no pierced ears). Abbas is held at gunpoint by another criminal and hands over the bag. It is full of rubbish. Olivia asks Minken to pluck Jackie's hair to compare her DNA. Olivia recognises the man who attacked her: talking to Jackie. Rune refuses to follow up Jann's idea about the plaza. Liam's boss tells him to get rid of Tom. Mette informs Olivia and Tom about Adelita and Nils. Liam sees Acke talking to Minken and Tom, they accuse Acke of ratting them out and beat him. Ovette enlists Minken to find Acke. Olivia deduces Nils went to Nordkoster to mourn Adelita: he had not known of her death in 1990. He now believes Linn was responsible.
8	"Episode 8"	Niklas Ohlson, Mattias Ohlsson	Cilla Börjlind, Rolf Börjlind	1 May 2016
Acke is found in a skip: badly beaten but alive. Ovette and Minken arrive after looking for him all night. Marianne detects Jackie's DNA on the hair clip Ove had from the murder scene. Mette questions Jackie who admits having had sex on the beach with a Norwegian client. She sees Olivia at the police station. Later she tells Rune and threatens to take him down if she is arrested. Ovette admits Acke's father was her client at Jackie's escort service. Tom sleeps; Liam and Adam block the door and burn down Vera's caravan. Alexander's agent at the airport is foiled when two police, Lisa and Bosse, meet Abbas. Olivia returns home: an injured Tom arrives. Abbas meets Mette and Tom at Olivia's and hands over Nils' evidence: a typed letter in Spanish from Adelita, breaking up with him, but sent a week after her death. Nils sent her to Nordkoster to recover hidden money. Olivia does not have a cassette player, they cannot hear the tape. Abbas sees Alexander's agent and neutralises him. Mette drives off, Alexander recognises her and phones Linn. Linn knows her company is will be ruined and she will be arrested.
9	"Episode 9"	Niklas Ohlson, Mattias Ohlsson	Cilla Börjlind, Rolf Börjlind	8 May 2016
Bertil arrives home early and Linn sees him downstairs while she shoots herself dead. She left a suicide note. Mette's team listen to the audiotape which has Nils and Linn arguing about the murder of a journalist in Kinshasa in 1987: Linn ordered him drowned in his car. Mette arrives at Linn's to arrest her and finds Bertil upstairs cradling his dead wife. Alexander hears the audiotape, he knew it existed but not its content. He confirms Linn heard excerpts over the phone, which disturbed her but denies she had him killed. Olivia and Mette agree that she killed herself over the tape's content. Mette tells her team about Alexander's suggestion that Nils was blackmailing Linn for revenge over Adelita's murder. Lisa asks to get the envelope and stamp examined for DNA. Abbas looks after the recovering Tom. Tom goes to the plaza and feigns drunkenness when Liam and Adam attack. Abbas stabs both, trusses them and posts a video online of Adam's confession about killing Vera. When arrested Liam reveals the next cage fight venue. While police squads raid the site, Rune claims to media cameras that he broke the criminal ring. Olivia remembers where she saw the earring.
10	"Episode 10"	Niklas Ohlson, Mattias Ohlsson	Cilla Börjlind, Rolf Börjlind	15 May 2016
Olivia tells Tom, Abbas and Mette about who wore the earring. Mette recalls when she saw Nils birthmark. She orders two DNA samples compared. Olivia finds the names of two druggies who stayed at Nordkoster, Alf and Sverker. Tom talks to Alf. Next day Mette and Tom interview Eva, who was Nils’ de facto partner. Mette confronts Eva with evidence of Adelita's murder. Eva admits to writing the fake "Adelita" letter. She claims killing Adelita was accidental, while trying to scare her to tell her about Nils. She was helped by her brother, Sverker and his friend, Alf. The other two left as Eva kept asking more questions and left Adelita to die in the spring tide. 25 years later Eva meets Nils on their favourite bridge, he explains about the Kishasa murder and why he had run off. Eva lets slip that she knew about Adelita, they struggle and she shoves him away and knocks him out. She puts Nils into his rented car, still alive, and runs it into the water. Tom tells Olivia that Adelita's baby was born by Caesarean section and raised by Arne and Maria as their adopted daughter.

=== Series 2 (2018) ===
No.	Title	Directed by	Written by	Original release date
1	"Episode 1"	Niklas Ohlson, Pontus Klänge	Cilla Börjlind, Rolf Börjlind	6 September 2018
Olivia returns to Stockholm in October 2017, after visiting Costa Rica and Mexico for six months. She goes to Mariags but sees her mum's new boyfriend and leaves. A near neighbour, teenaged Sandra discovers her father, Bengt hanging in their home and runs out screaming as Olivia walks by. Sandra is now an orphan and her aunt, Charlotte is away so Olivia looks after her. Sandra's laptop is missing. Next day Charlotte collects Sandra. They are helped by the vicar, Thomas. Maria visits Olivia who considers changing her name to Rivera. Olivia meets Mette and learns Tom lives on Stockholm Archipelago. Minken hides from debt collectors at Tom's. Sandra sits on the edge of Charlotte's building and is self-harming. In Marseilles a dismembered body of a 35-year-old woman is discovered on the shoreline. Local chief detective, Michelle investigates. The victim wears a distinctive anklet. Lisa and Bosse investigate theft of a drug, 5–IT, from Customs. Mette informs them that Bengt, a Customs Officer, was hanged. Forensics finds he was murdered and they collect skin under his fingernails. Abbas reads a newspaper report and recognises his former lover, Samira. He phones Tom to join him in Marseilles.
2	"Episode 2"	Niklas Ohlson, Pontus Klänge	Cilla Börjlind, Rolf Börjlind	13 September 2018
Sandra goes to Customs looking for her laptop. She tells her dad's colleague, Gabriella, that Bengt was murdered. Nidal identifies the murdered woman as her younger sister, Samira, a blind actress. Abbas and Tom travel to Marseilles, Abbas is wanted by local criminals. Tom knows Michelle and asks about Samira's murder but is warned that Abbas will trigger violence. Mette, Lisa and Bosse believe Bengt was murdered over the Customs drug theft. Mette orders Olivia not to investigate Bengt's murder but to choose her police posting. Abbas tells Mette he is in Marseilles with Tom. Samira had broken off their affair due to threats from her husband and circus owner, Villon. A retired circus performer says Villon died soon after Abbas had left town. She is unwilling to say more but directs him to circus clown, Pujol. Mette's squad find no sign of 5-IT on the streets. Bengt's phone records show numerous calls to Gabriella. She claims they were work-related, even at 2:30 a.m and denies any romantic involvement. Pujol tells Abbas about Samira's final years and directs him to Nidal, her sister. Later Pujol is attacked by Josef working for crime boss, Philippe.
3	"Episode 3"	Niklas Ohlson, Pontus Klänge	Cilla Börjlind, Rolf Börjlind	20 September 2018
TV journalist, Alex takes Olivia to an aged care home, Silvergården. Bengt's father, Gustav died suspiciously but the manager, Margit stifles queries. The owner, Jean meets his enforcer, Magnus to discuss Alex. Abbas and Tom talk to injured Pujol: Samira was duped into drugs, prostitution and pornography by Philippe. Tom goes to Philippe's bar and brothel. Abbas tortures Philippe into admitting he rented Samira out to a pornographer, "The Bull". Olivia questions Margit as Sandra's legal representative to find how Gustav died. Margit claims a computer crash lost his records but he died of a heart attack. She won't name who worked that night. Olivia finds out it was Clare. Alex and Olivia skype Clare, she tells of a confidentiality agreement but sent an email to Bengt the day he died. Tom informs Michelle about the Bull, while Abbas breaks into the Bull's video store, finds the murder scene and a DVD with the Bull as Alain. He is shot at by Alain. Sandra struggles with her grief, Olivia suggests a session with Mårten. Michelle warns Tom to leave town with Abbas. Pujol phones Abbas to collect Samira's things but it's a trap: Abbas is shot by Josef.
4	"Episode 4"	Niklas Ohlson, Pontus Klänge	Cilla Börjlind, Rolf Börjlind	27 September 2018
Severely injured Abbas is found on the shoreline and is rushed to surgery. Michelle informs Tom his prognosis is poor. Rune is promoted above Mette in her division. Michelle orders back to Stockholm, he collects his medication and rents a barge cabin from cemetery sexton, Luna. Mette learns Abbas was shot and finds Tom but he turns away. She asks Olivia to help with him: Olivia wants him to investigate Bengt's murder. Sandra worries the murderer might come after her. Rune wants Mette to retire and grooms Lisa as her replacement. Tom has nightmares about Abbas, but Mette says Abbas is recovering. She also tells him about 5-IT stolen from Customs. Sandra sees Mårten, who gives her a journal to write her thoughts. Tom asks Muriel about 5-IT, who has some from her pusher, Classe. Tom takes it to Mette to analyse. Mette also wants Tom to find dirt on Rune: Jackie's former client. Tom confronts Jackie about her client list; she claims its outdated and only shows potential clients. Classe is under surveillance and photographed kissing Gabriella. When questioned she denies an ongoing relationship or knowing his drug connections. Mette collapses at work.
5	"Episode 5"	Niklas Ohlson, Pontus Klänge	Cilla Börjlind, Rolf Börjlind	4 October 2018
Mette had a heart attack, Mårten tells Tom and Olivia. Classe and Gabriella are long-term lovers and conspired to steal drugs. Jean charms Ann to gain lucrative contracts for his business, Albion. Alex shows Olivia his interview of Ann, whom he asks about Silvergården. Olivia meets Jean in an art gallery he invites her to his private estate on Värmdö. When she arrives he tries to charm her as she cases his security. Magnus checks on her with Margit, who describes her. While on his estate, she is shown his secure room and notices a laptop with a butterfly sticker. After she leaves Magnus tells Jean who she is and quickly follows. He sees her talk to Alex. Under Mårten's advice Olivia maintains her distance from Sandra who reacts poorly and storms off. Tom asks Minken about Rune being Jackie's client. Mette is back home and discusses the Bengt case with Lisa. Minken tells Tom that Ovette was one of Jackie's prostitutes. Tom asks her to testify against Jackie and Rune but she refuses. Abbas is recovering and is determined to hunt Alain. Marie gives Abbas a letter Samira wrote long ago but was never delivered.
6	"Episode 6"	Niklas Ohlson, Pontus Klänge	Cilla Börjlind, Rolf Börjlind	11 October 2018
Gabriella hides with Classe when he dumps her, she pulls a gun and locks him up. Police raid the house: Gabriella claims she was imprisoned. Olivia studies Jean's estate plans. Abbas leaves hospital avoiding police supervision. Gabriella says she ended their relationship because of Classe's drug connections. Classe is tied to stolen 5-IT via its batch number, he asks for his lawyer. Michelle gets a warrant for Alain's arrest. Abbas finds Alain's flat where Michelle warns him to leave Marseilles. Alain sees them talking and leaves. Rune wants to keep Mette uninformed. Abbas returns to Stockholm. The vicar, Thomas delivers Bengt's eulogy. Sandra walks out mid-service; Olivia tries to talk but is snubbed. When Abbas arrives home Tom explains why he left Marseilles. Olivia visits Alex but a woman in a robe answers, she leaves in a huff. Olivia goes to Tom who comforts her. Michelle phones Tom to say Alain left France. He is having sex with Jackie. Jackie recognises Tom from Alain's phone. Abbas visits Tom and Luna to talk about Alain. Rune tells Mette he's taken over the Bengt investigation due to sloppy work. Tom updates Mette on Alain. Magnus sneaks into Olivia's home and threatens her.
7	"Episode 7"	Niklas Ohlson, Pontus Klänge	Cilla Börjlind, Rolf Börjlind	18 October 2018
Magnus arrives at Albion's board meeting, Jean leaves and asks him to await its outcome. Tom calls Olivia, she has figured another way into Jean's Värmdö estate. She parks near its perimeter fence and breaks in. Jean arrives as Oiivia looks through security glass at Sandra's laptop. She remembers the door's code, goes in and opens the laptop: calling Sandra for its password. She takes photos of Clare's report about Gustav's death. She hears a noise but is trapped as air is withdrawn and faints. Jean enters to take the laptop and her mobile. Tom is worried, borrows Luna's car and goes to Värmdö. He parks beside her car and enters. He sees Magnus returning along the jetty and finds Olivia's body in the sea. He rescues her. Magnus tells Jean he disposed of Olivia and checks with a gun. Tom carries her to Luna's car and drives to the barge. She tells him about her mobile, so Tom returns to Värmdö. He enters with Luna's gun, returning soon after with Olivia's phone. Jean had been shot dead. Rune sees CCTV of Tom leaving while holding a gun and arrests Tom for murder but refuses to supply his medications.
8	"Episode 8"	Niklas Ohlson, Pontus Klänge	Cilla Börjlind, Rolf Börjlind	25 October 2018
Tom has a panic attack without medication. Mette returns to work, sees footage of Tom leaving Jean's with a gun. Luna confirms to Rune that she allowed Tom to use her car but denies knowing about a gun. Rune taunts Tom in his cell by withholding his medication. Olivia researches Clare's report: Gustav died from an unapproved drug, Meteris. Sandra tells Mårten of her journal entries. He tells her she wants to hurt herself and others due to her own hurts. Mette promises Tom to get medication. Jean's company manufactured Meteris with disastrous results in India and covered up its use at Silvergården. Luna gives Mette her gun: wrong calibre for Jean's murder. The actual weapon is found near his jetty. Magnus colludes with Margit for an alibi. Tom is freed and tells Rune of Jackie's client list. Rune and Jackie meet in an underground venue, she claims there's only one prostitute left from those days, Ovette. Rune threatens Ovette not to talk. Tom explains to Luna about his mother murdering his rapist father. CCTV shows Magnus leaving Jean's murder scene; he was also near Bengt's home when he was murdered.
9	"Episode 9"	Niklas Ohlson, Pontus Klänge	Cilla Börjlind, Rolf Börjlind	1 November 2018
Tom and Alain fight, until Luna arrives. Tom warns Mette and Abbas of Alain. Magnus uses Margit's alibi, denies connections with Bengt or Olivia. Alex and Olivia skype Clare: Meteris caused deaths at Silvergården. Michelle informs Mette that Alain phoned Jackie. Lisa and Bosse visit Jackie who denies knowing Alain but they find his luggage. At the station Rune sees Jackie arrested. Mette questions her; she claims Alain was a fuck buddy. His luggage has Sandra's laptop: he was at Jean's and possibly his murderer. Ovette confronts Rune, who says he'll kill Acke; she counters that Acke is his son. Rune meets Jackie, who confirms Acke's paternity. Mette tells Tom, Olivia and Abbas that Alain knows Jackie. Tom plays Rune a recording of his threats to Ovette. He orders Rune to leave by Monday or it’ll go to the public prosecutor. Magnus' DNA does not match any found on Bengt. Alex presents a TV report on Silvergården's covered up deaths due to Meteris. Magnus and Margit are arrested. Jackie and Alain argue: he kills her. Alain is knocked out, handcuffed by Abbas. who throws knives at him. Abbas reads Samira's letter, who professed her love. Abbas directs Mette to Alain.
10	"Episode 10"	Niklas Ohlson, Pontus Klänge	Cilla Börjlind, Rolf Börjlind	8 November 2018
Michelle arrives to help question Alain over Samira's death. He denies knowing her. IT find a deleted video on Sandra's laptop. Partially restored, it shows Alain and Samira having sex with background voices. Olivia recognises Bengt and Jean. Alain killed Samira in the webcast, he recently shot Jean but did not kill Bengt (not his DNA). Olivia tells Sandra that Bengt had watched porn and saved a video to her laptop before deleting it. Olivia informs Thomas of the webcast hoping he'll help Sandra cope. Mette plays her a third voice: its Thomas. Mette and Lisa question him, his long-term friends were Bengt and Jean. They bonded over periodic "boys nights" drinking and watching porn videos. Jean organised the live webcast but only Bengt wanted to tell police. Thomas struggled with Bengt who fell unconscious. He was hanged while still alive. Thomas evades police and goes to Charlotte's building where Sandra stands on the ledge. Thomas joins her and confesses that he accidentally killed Bengt, she tells him to jump. He climbs down and is arrested by police brought by Olivia and Mette. Olivia and Sandra light a floating lantern for their departed parents.
