= Emelie Garbers =

Swedish actress (born 1982)

Emelie Garbers (née Jonsson; born 1 September, 1982) is a Swedish actress.

Her role as the Mimarobe in the 2018 science fiction film Aniara garnered her a Guldbagge Award for Best Actress in a Leading Role at the 55th Guldbagge Awards in January 2020. Other film credits include the 2012 television movie Call Girl. Her television credits include the drama Dejta on Sveriges Television. She appeared in the 2024 TV series End of Summer.

Garbers was educated at the Royal Swedish Ballet School and the Stockholm University of the Arts.
