= Anders de la Motte =

Swedish crime writer

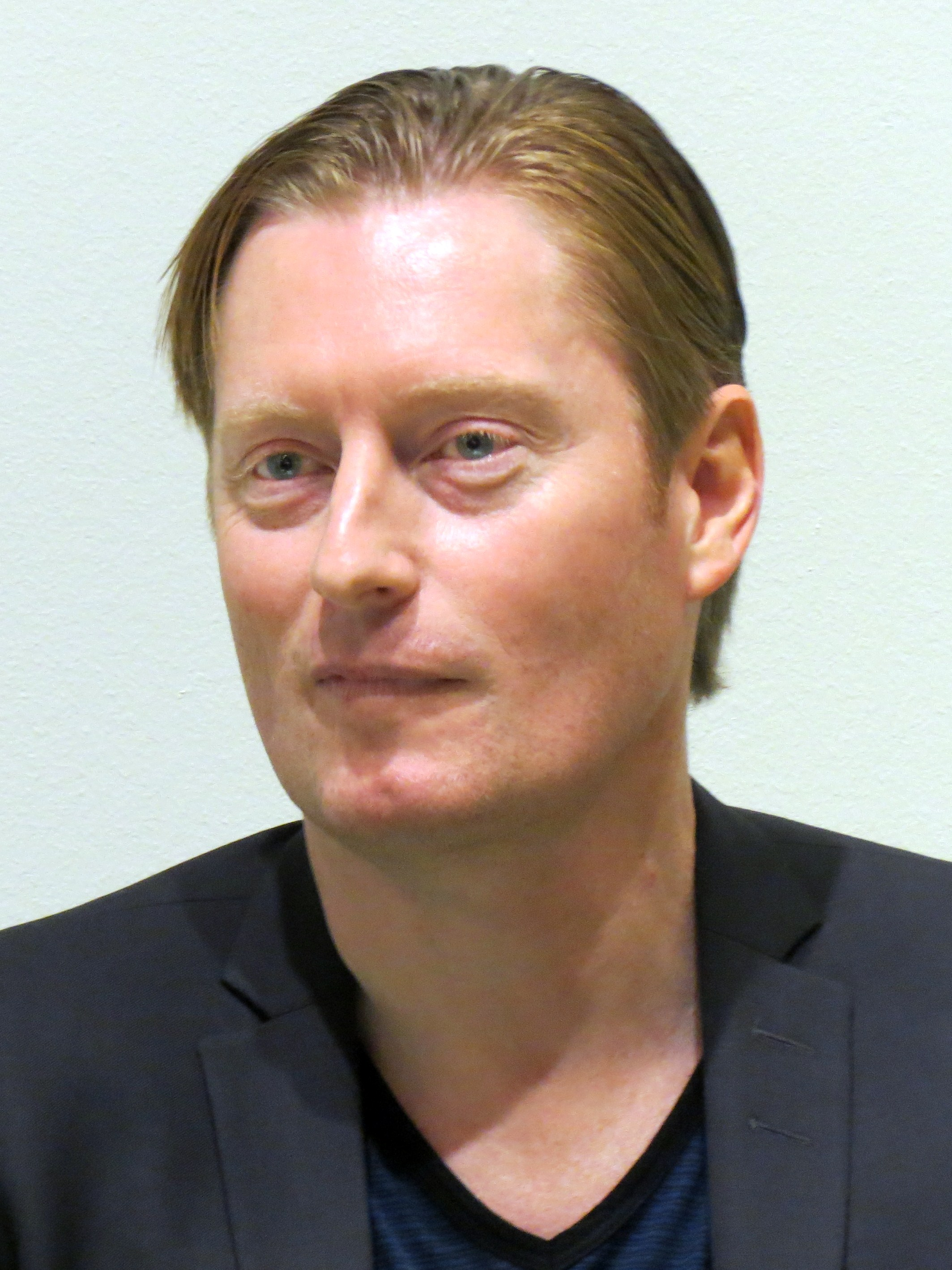
- Anders de la Motte in 2014
- Born: 19 June 1971
- Occupation: Writer

Lars Anders Thomas de la Motte (born 19 June 1971) is a Swedish crime writer.

== Biography ==
Anders de la Motte grew up in the town of Billesholm in Skåne County in southern Sweden, where his mother was librarian in Bjuv. He then moved to Stockholm and trained to be a police officer, a job he held from 1996 to 2001, when he moved to Skåne Lomma, where he and his family reside. From 2001 to 2012 he worked in security at UPS and then as head of security at the Dell in Copenhagen, where he was responsible for their activities in Europe, the Middle East and Africa. These work experiences have since been used in his work as a writer of thriller/crime fiction

In 2010 he debuted with the book Game, the first in a trilogy with the protagonists Henrik "HP" Pettersson, a narcissistic slacker, and Rebecca Normén, his complicated police officer sister. For that he was awarded the Swedish Crime Writers' Academy's Debut Award in 2010. It was followed in 2011 by the second novel, Buzz and concluded with Bubble in 2012. With a plot that revolves around the modern IT community and social media revolution, with its hazards from narcissism, the novels feature a fast narrative style and language that evokes the world of a computer game. De la Motte has opined that social media sites like Facebook encourage oversharing personal information with "hint of narcissism and desperation about it all". In a 2010 interview, De la Motte stated that he had written two unpublished drafts of novels prior to Game after his wife, a teacher, encouraged him to try his hand at the craft. He said of the first two manuscripts that they were too mundane; "it was a very traditional affair. Murder investigation stuff.". In addition to the Game trilogy success in his native Sweden, the series received editorial praise in the United States from such publications as Kirkus Reviews and Publishers Weekly.

The trilogy was followed by the books MemoRandom (2014) and UltiMatum (2015). For the latter he received the Swedish Crime Writers' Academy award for Best Swedish Crime Novel 2015. His books are optioned for the production of an international TV series and movie; the Game trilogy by the French company Gaumont, the latter two books by the American company Twentieth Century Fox with de la Motte as co-producer and involved as screenwriter. (A HollywoodReporter.com article claims that Lionsgate has optioned the TV rights to MemoRandom, while in a 2015 interview, it is claimed that his first four books are optioned by Paramount for film/TV.). His books have been translated into numerous languages worldwide, and are available in over 30 countries. His novels have been described as crime fiction and thrillers in the vein of Scandi-noir.

His novel Slutet på sommaren (published September 2016) was shortlisted for the Swedish Academy of Crime Writers’ Award for Best Swedish Crime Novel. As of early 2017, it has not yet been optioned for English translation. It was adapted as a six-episode TV serial and shown on BBC TV in 2024 with the title ‘The End of Summer’.

== Awards and honors ==
- 2010 – Swedish Crime Writers' Academy Debut for Game
- 2015 – Swedish Crime Writers' Academy award for Best Swedish Crime Novel for UltiMatum

== Bibliography ==
- 2010 – Game Alfabeta Publishing, ISBN 978-91-501-1267-2
- 2011 – Buzz, Alfabeta Publishing, ISBN 9789150113228
- 2012 – Bubble, Alfabeta Publishing, ISBN 978-91-501-1472-0
- 2014 – MemoRandom, Forum Publishing, ISBN 9789137141794
- 2015 – UltiMatum, Forum Publishing, ISBN 9789137141817
