= Margit Abenius =

Swedish literary critic, researcher, and author (1899–1970)

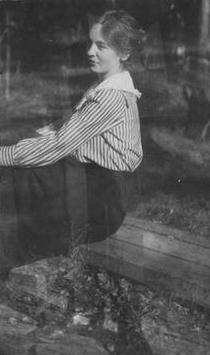
- Margit Abenius around 1920
- Born: Margareta Ulrika Abenius; 14 July 1899; Orsa, Sweden
- Died: 3 August 1970 (aged 71); Uppsala, Sweden
- Education: Uppsala University
- Occupations: Literary critic; Researcher; Author; Translator; Essayist

Margareta Ulrika Abenius (14 July 1899 – 3 August 1970) was a Swedish literary critic, researcher, author, translator, and essayist. One of the leading voices of the Swedish literary canon in the 20th century, Abenius is best known for her biography of fellow Swedish poet Karin Boye.

== Life ==
Margit Abenius was born to a middle-class family in Orsa, Sweden, on 14 July 1899. Her father Wilhelm Abenius was a lecturer in chemistry, secondary-school teacher, and author, and her mother Maria Abenius came from a priest family in Västmanland. Abenius had three younger siblings: Håkan, Sigurd, and Ingrid. She spent her early years in Borås. The family moved to Örebro in 1915, where Abenius's father became the headmaster of a technical school. During her time in Örebro, Abenius attended the Risbergska skolan. Growing up in a literary faction, Abenius developed an early interest in reading, poetry, folk-lore, and story-telling. Abenius's early education included lessons from the theologian and psalm composer Emil Liedgren who inspired her. Her reading included Nordic literature: she frequently read works of Ola Hansson, Henrik Ibsen, Jonas Lie, Oscar Levertin, and Adolf Torneros. Other authors she enjoyed were Swedish romantics Carl Jonas Love Almqvist and Per Daniel Amadeus Atterbom.

In 1917, Abenius attended the Uppsala Enskilda Läroverk private school, where she completed her secondary education and graduated in 1919. Abenius discovered her love for stylistics during her high-school when she took Swedish and English courses. Her professor of Nordic languages, Bengt Hesselman encouraged her to research on stylistics, and she published articles on Nysvenska in the following years. She received a degree in Nordic languages, English and history of literature from the Uppsala University in 1925, and earned the licentiate degree in Nordic languages three years later. Soon after, she began working towards a PhD, focusing her study on Swedish poet and critic Johan Henric Kellgren. She completed her thesis in 1931. During her time at Uppsala, Abenius developed a close friendship with fellow poet Karin Boye.

== Writing career ==
In 1927, Abenius began writing for the Christian journal Vår lösen. Between 1931 and 1964, she wrote for the Bonniers Litterära Magasin and Ord och Bild, which included literary reviews, cultural essays, and translations of works of other writers. Abenius analysed the works of both Swedish and international contemporary writers including those of Emily Dickinson, Virginia Woolf, Cora Sandel, and Karin Boye. During this time, she also worked as a literary critic on the radio, reviewing lyrical poetry and prose.

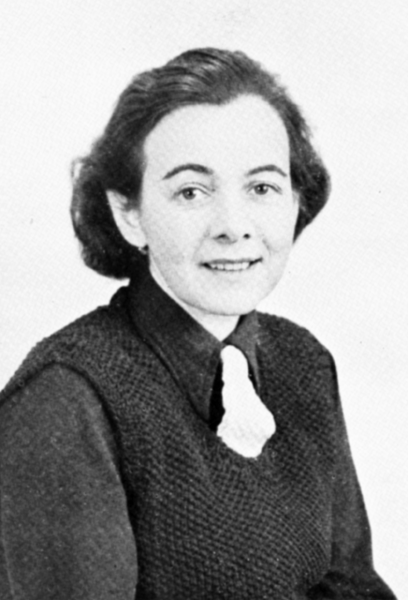
Abenius published the biography of her close friend Karin Boye (pictured) in 1950.

In the 1940s, Abenius published Kontakter, a collection of 20 of her previously published literary works and essays. Kontakter established her status as one of the leading voices of the Swedish literary era. In his essay published in Svensk yrkeskvinna, literary scholar Sven Stolpe hailed Abenius as "one of the day's best critics". In the 1950s, Abenius began introducing French philosopher Simone Weil to Swedish readers. She translated many of Weil's works into Swedish, including La Pesanteur et la grâce; she and Karin Stolpe published a collection of Weil's letters and essays Personen och det heliga. Essäer och brev in 1961.

Abenius's best-known work is the biography of Karin Boye entitled Drabbad av renhet. En bok om Karin Boyes liv och diktning, published in 1950. The biography was well-received upon first publication. Later, Abenius's conservative analysis of Boye's homosexuality drew criticism.

== Later years ==
Abenius served as a member of the Swedish literary society, Samfundet De Nio. She published her autobiography Memoarer från det inre in 1963 to positive reception. In 1965, she was honoured with a Birger-Sjöberg award for her contributions. Abenius died in Uppsala, on 3 August 1970.
