= Tord Hall =

Swedish mathematician

Tord Hall (7 January 1910 - 30 September 1987) was a Swedish mathematician, university professor and bestselling author.

== Life ==
He was born in 1910 in Jönköping, Sweden, and died in 1987.

== Career ==
He completed his Ph.D. in mathematics from Uppsala University. His PhD advisor was Arne Beurling. The title of his PhD thesis was On Polynomials bounded at an Infinity of Points.

From 1959 to 1975, he was a professor of mathematics at Uppsala University. He published several mathematical theorems.

In addition to his academic career, he also worked as an employee for newspaper Svenska Dagbladet and Sveriges Radio, the national Swedish radio.

== Bibliography ==
He is most well known as the biographer of Carl Gauss (Biography of Carl Gauss). It was translated into English by Albert Froderberg.

The book generally received favorable reviews.
