= Svenska Dagbladet Literature Prize =

The Svenska Dagbladets litteraturpris is a Swedish literature prize given by the newspaper Svenska Dagbladet annually since 1944.

== Prize winners ==
Year	Author(s)
1944	Harry Martinson, Lars Ahlin, Elly Jannes, Ole Torvalds
1945	Sivar Arnér, Björn-Erik Höijer, Arne Nyman, Marianne Alopaeus, Nils Åke Malmström, Astrid Lindgren, Anna Lisa Lundkvist
1946	Stig Dagerman, Tage Aurell, Bengt Anderberg
1947	Erik Lindegren, Otto Karl-Oskarsson, Solveig von Schoultz, Hans Bergrahm
1948	Stina Aronson, Vilgot Sjöman, Ragnar Bengtsson, Bengt V. Wall, Åke Holmberg
1949	Werner Aspenström, Folke Dahlberg, Lars Göransson, Owe Husáhr
1950	Gustaf Rune Eriks, Tore Zetterholm, Hanserik Hjertén, Britt G Hallqvist
1951	Willy Kyrklund, Staffan Larsson, Per Anders Fogelström, Viveca Hollmerus
1952	Ulla Isaksson, Bertil Schütt, Ragnar Thoursie, Sandro Key-Åberg, Tove Jansson
1953	Sara Lidman, Oscar Parland
1954	Lise Drougge, Birger Vikström, Folke Isaksson
1955	Elsa Grave, Hans Peterson
1956	Walter Ljungquist
1957	Birgitta Trotzig, Erland Josephson
1958	Lars Gyllensten, Åke Wassing
1959	Bengt Söderbergh, Kurt Salomonson

Year	English title	Original title	Author	Ref
1960		Bröderna	Lars Gustafsson	
1961		Den svala dagen	Bo Carpelan	
1962		Fursten	Gunnar E. Sandgren	
1963		Sökarna	Per Olof Sundman	
1964		Elis	Peder Sjögren	
1965		Generalerna	Per Wahlöö	
1966		Hess	Per Olov Enquist	
1967		Myten om Wu Tao-Tzu	Sven Lindqvist	
1968		Vem älskar Yngve Frej?	Stig Claesson	
1969		Uppkomlingarna – en personundersökning	Per Gunnar Evander	
1970		åminne	Sven Delblanc	
1971		Moder jord	Gösta Friberg	
1972		Docent Åke Ternvall ser en syn	Rita Tornborg	
1973		Djurdoktorn	P. C. Jersild	
1974		Rackarsång	Hans O. Granlid	
1975		Det obevekliga paradiset 1–25	Kjell Espmark	
1976		Sandro Botticellis sånger and Prästungen	Göran Tunström	
1977		Inte värre än vanligt	Gerda Antti	
1978		Bergsmusik	Tobias Berggren	
1979		Språk; Verktyg; Eld	Göran Sonnevi	
1980		Walters hus	Anna Westberg	
1981		Hungerbarnen	Heidi von Born	
1982		Bikungskupan	Lars Andersson	
1983		Till Bajkal, inte längre	Peeter Puide	
1984		Honungsvargar	Sun Axelsson	
1985		Guldspiken	Peter Nilson	
1986		Luften är full av S	Christer Eriksson	
1987		Svarta villan	Ernst Brunner	
1988		Övning	Konny Isgren	
1989		Hundstunden	Kristina Lugn	
1990		Det hemliga ljuset	Urban Andersson	
1991		Rit	Inger Edelfeldt	
1992		Korta och långa kapitel	Sigrid Combüchen	
1993		Fungi	Agneta Pleijel	
1994		Hejdad tid	Eva Runefelt	
1995		Stora scenen and Är vi långt från Montmartre?	Gunnar Harding	
1996		Anvisningar till en far	Peter Kihlgård	
1997		Steinhof	Carola Hansson	
1998		Resenärerna	Ellen Mattson	
1999		En lampa som gör mörker	Per Odensten	
2000		Jag vill stå träd nu	Anne-Marie Berglund	
2001		Pompeji	Maja Lundgren	
2002		Rönndruvan glöder	Stewe Claeson	
2003		Öde	Christine Falkenland	
2004		Glömde väl inte ljusets element när du räknade	Birgitta Lillpers	
2005		Himlen och andra upptäckter	Jesper Svenbro	
2006		Vid den stora floden	Lars Jakobson	
2007		Bäras utan namn till natt till morgon	Arne Johnsson	
2008		Ursprunget	Li Li	
2009		Camera Obscura	Johanna Holmström	
2010		Kioskvridning 140 grader	Peter Törnqvist	
2011		Salome	Mara Lee	
2012		En storm kom från paradiset	Johannes Anyuru	
2013	Wilful Disregard	Egenmäktigt förfarande – en roman om kärlek	Lena Andersson	
2014		Liv till varje pris	Kristina Sandberg	
