= 1912 in Sweden =

- Decades: 1890s; 1900s; 1910s; 1920s; 1930s
- See also: Other events of 1912; Timeline of Swedish history

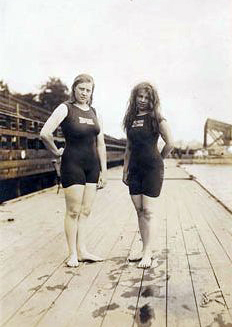
Fanny Durack and Mina Wylie, the gold and silver medallists in the first women's individual swimming event

Events from the year 1912 in Sweden.

== Incumbents ==
- Monarch – Gustaf V
- Prime Minister - Karl Staaff

== Events ==
- 3 January – The Svenska Scoutförbundet is formed.
- 15 January – Sven Hedin's contribution to the Swedish defence issue, Ett varningsord, is published and distributed in one million copies.
- 2 April – The Swedish government puts forward a proposal for women's suffrage, but it is blocked by the FK.
- 28 April – A charity matinee is organised in Stockholm for the Swedish victims of the Titanic disaster.
- 5 May–22 July –The Olympic Games take place in Stockholm.
- 8 May – The Swedish Parliament decides to establish the National Board of Health and Welfare from 1 January 1913.
- 19 May – August Strindberg is buried, and large crowds line the cortege route. Nathan Söderblom officiates at the funeral, which takes place at the 'Nya kyrkogården' (Norra begravningsplatsen) in Stockholm.
- 1 June – The Stockholm Olympic Stadium, designed by Torben Grut, is inaugurated for the Olympic Games.
- 2 August – A Swedish study shows that farm trade has increased so much that other trade is suffering.
- 16 August – The first Swedish aerial photograph is presented.
- 16 August – Swedish Televerket starts to offer the Lyxtelegram service.
- 17 September – The Pentecostal church in Skövde is founded as one of the first Pentecostal churches in Sweden.
- 27 September – 42-year-old Swedish engineer and inventor Gustaf Dalén, director of AGA since 1909, loses his eyesight when an experiment goes wrong.
- 6 October – DN organises a competition for Sweden's most popular names. Erik wins before Karl, Margit and Anna.
- 14 November – Erik Axel Karlfeldt is appointed Permanent Secretary of the Swedish Academy.
- 1 December – The first stage of the Inlandsbanan railway, Östersund-Strömsund, opens for traffic in Sweden.
- 1 December – The tradition of using Advent stars was introduced in Sweden by Sven Erik Aurelius' wife Julia.
- 8 December – The newly completed Kiruna church was consecrated by Bishop Olof Bergqvist along with eight priests.
- 10 December – Gustaf Dalén wins the Nobel Prize in Physics for inventing the automatic lighthouse.

== Births ==
- 6 January – Johnny Bode, composer (died 1983)
- 8 January – Folke Hamrin, actor (died 1982)
- 16 January – Frank Sundström, actor (died 1993)
- 23 January – Manne Grünberger, actor (died 1997)
- 26 January – Gösta Kjellertz, singer (died 1984)
- 1 February – Rolf Gülich, motorcycle rider (died 2010)
- 12 February – Thore Christiansen, singer (died 1980)
- 17 February – Birgit Lennartsson, actor and singer (died 1997)
- 18 February – Bo Hederström, actor (died 2001)
- 18 February – Bengt Lissegårdh, artist (died 1979)
- 28 February – Prince Bertil, Duke of Halland, Swedish prince (died 1997)
- 12 March – Sixten Sason, industrial designer (died 1967)
- 18 March – Henrik Dyfverman, actor and television producer (died 1998)
- 22 March – Per-Erik Rundquist, novelist and poet (died 1986)
- 1 April – Sven-Otto Lindqvist, actor (died 1964)
- 2 April – Sigvard Törnqvist, rider and composer (died 1990)
- 7 April – Sven Bertil Norberg, actor (died 1967)
- 20 April – Erik Larsson, cross-country skier (died 1982)
- 4 May – Britta Brunius, actress (died 2000)
- 7 May – Rune Landsberg, actor (died 1989)
- 8 May – Dagny Carlsson, blogger (died 2022)
- 21 May – Sven Melin, actor and singer (died 1966)
- 21 May – Lille Bror Söderlundh, composer and singer (died 1957)
- 21 May – Ingmar Ström, author and bishop (died 2003)
- 29 June – Bertil Sjödin, actor (died 1997)
- 6 July – Ruth Moberg, actor and opera singer (died 1997)
- 11 July – Aino Taube, actor (died 1990)
- 14 July – Per-Martin Hamberg, composer, scriptwriter, director, author and radio producer (died 1974)
- 4 August – Raoul Wallenberg, architech, businessman and diplomat (died 1947)
- 8 August – Ilse-Nore Tromm, actress (died 1994)
- 25 August – Marta Lindberg, social democratic politician (died 2006)
- 9 September – Marianne Zetterström, author and journalist (died 2011)
- 21 September – Gösta Björling, opera singer (died 1957)
- 29 September – Sture Ericson, actor and director (died 1979)
- 6 October – Karin Albihn, actress (died 1974)
- 22 October – Henrik Sandblad, historian (died 1991)
- 14 November – Åke Jensen, actor and singer (died 1993)
- 27 November – Birgit Rosengren, actress (died 2011)
- 21 December – Brita Appelgren, actress and ballet dancer (died 1999)

== Deaths ==
- 14 May - August Strindberg, writer (born 1849)
- Lotten von Kræmer, writer and philanthropist (born 1828)
