= 1995 in Sweden =

- Decades: 1970s; 1980s; 1990s; 2000s; 2010s
- See also: Other events of 1995; Timeline of Swedish history

Events from the year 1995 in Sweden.

== Incumbents ==
- Monarch – Carl XVI Gustaf
- Prime Minister – Ingvar Carlsson

== Events ==
=== 1 January ===
Sweden accedes to the European Union.

=== September ===
- Establishment of the Haparanda Archipelago National Park.

=== November ===
- The November Storm of 1995

== Popular culture ==
=== Literature ===
- Hummelhonung, novel by Torgny Lindgren, winner of the August Prize.
- Underbara kvinnor vid vatten, novel by Monika Fagerholm, received the Thanks for the Book Award
- Comédia infantil, novel by Henning Mankell, English translation Chronicler of the Winds (2006).

=== Sports ===
- 5–18 June – the 1995 FIFA Women's World Cup were held
- 5–13 August – the 1995 World Championships in Athletics were held in Gothenburg
- The 1995 Allsvenskan was won by IFK Göteborg

== Births ==
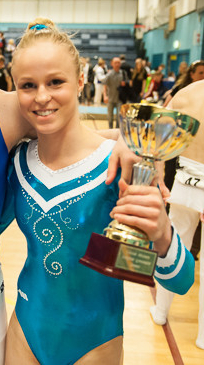
Jonna Adlerteg

- 9 May – Oliver Källbom, ice hockey player
- 6 June – Jonna Adlerteg, gymnast
- 21 June – Jesper Karlström, footballer
- 6 August – Rebecca Peterson, Swedish tennis player
- 2 November – Hanna Öberg, biathlete

== Deaths ==
- 8 June – Erik Beckman, poet, novelist and playwright (born 1935).
- 16 June – Tore Edman, ski jumper (born 1904)
- 13 September – Birger Norman, journalist, poet, novelist, playwright and non-fiction writer (born 1914).
- 14 October – Karl Widmark, canoer (born 1911)
