= Selma Lagerlöf Prize =

Swedish literary prize

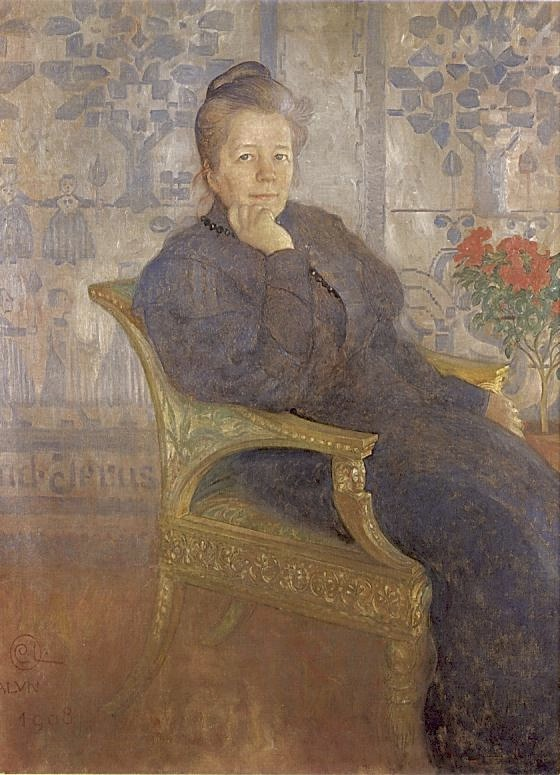
Selma Lagerlöf pained by Carl Larsson in 1908

The Selma Lagerlöf Prize is a Swedish literary prize awarded to an author writing in the spirit of Selma Lagerlöf, the first woman to win the Nobel Prize in Literature. The prize was founded by the Sunne Municipality in Värmland County in 1983 and has been awarded annually since 1984. Recipients receive 100,000 Swedish kronor. The awards ceremony takes place in Sunne every August 13 and is in honor of Selma Lagerlöf.

== List of recipients ==
The winners of the Selma Lagerlöf Prize are:

- 1984 – Birgitta Trotzig
- 1985 – Sara Lidman
- 1986 – Astrid Lindgren
- 1987 – Göran Tunström
- 1988 – Lars Ahlin
- 1989 – Kerstin Ekman
- 1990 – Lars Andersson
- 1991 – Lars Gyllensten
- 1992 – Tove Jansson
- 1993 – Georg Henrik von Wright
- 1994 – Stig Claesson
- 1995 – Ulla Isaksson
- 1996 – Rolf Edberg
- 1997 – Per Olov Enquist
- 1998 – Göran Palm
- 1999 – Kristina Lugn
- 2000 – Torgny Lindgren
- 2001 – Agneta Pleijel
- 2002 – Peter Englund
- 2003 – P. C. Jersild
- 2004 – Sigrid Combüchen
- 2005 – Birgitta Stenberg
- 2006 – Lars Jakobson
- 2007 – Barbro Lindgren
- 2008 – John Ajvide Lindqvist
- 2009 – Lars Gustafsson
- 2010 – Jan Lööf
- 2011 – Ellen Mattson
- 2012 – Klas Östergren
- 2013 – Kjell Johansson
- 2014 – Lotta Lotass
- 2015 – Stewe Claeson
- 2016 – Sara Stridsberg
- 2017 – Lars Norén
- 2018 – Carola Hansson
- 2019 – Kristina Sandberg
- 2020 – Monika Fagerholm
- 2021 – Niklas Rådström
- 2022 – Inger Edelfeldt
- 2023 – Bengt Berg
- 2024 – Steve Sem-Sandberg
- 2025 – Eva Lindström
