= Dobloug Prize =

Literary award

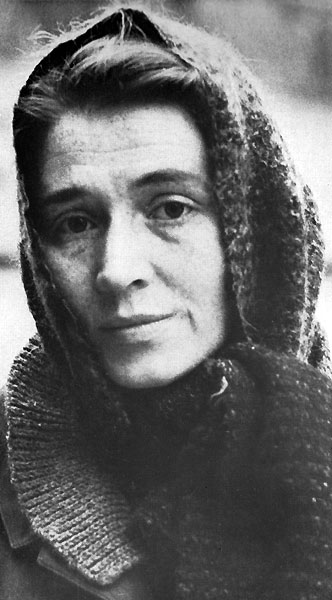
Birgitta Trotzig

The Dobloug Prize (Swedish: Doblougska priset, Norwegian: Doblougprisen) is a literature prize in Sweden, awarded for Swedish and Norwegian fiction. The prize is named after Norwegian businessman and philanthropist Birger Dobloug (1881–1944) pursuant to his bequest. The prize sum is 4 * 150,000 Swedish crowns (2011). The Dobloug Prize is awarded annually by the Swedish Academy.

== Prize winners ==
List of winners, source:

Year	Swedish winner	Norwegian winner
1951	Gunnar Ekelöf	Arnulf Øverland
1951	Eyvind Johnson	Arnulf Øverland
1952	Sten Selander	Tore Ørjasæter
1953	Ivar Lo-Johansson	Gunnar Reiss-Andersen
1954	Harry Martinson	Inge Krokann
1954	Erik Lindegren	Inge Krokann
1955	Karl Asplund	Herman Wildenvey
1955	Sven Barthel	Herman Wildenvey
1956	Bertil Malmberg	Emil Boyson
1957	Hans Ruin	Tarjei Vesaas
1958	Artur Lundkvist	Johan Falkberget
1959	Gustav Hedenvind-Eriksson	Aksel Sandemose
1960	Eyvind Johnson	Halldis Moren Vesaas
1961	Sara Lidman	Alf Larsen
1962	Irja Browallius	Inger Hagerup
1963	Lars Ahlin	Jan-Magnus Bruheim
1964	Lars Gyllensten	Torborg Nedreaas
1965	Fritiof Nilsson Piraten	Johan Borgen
1966	Tage Aurell	Jakob Sande
1967	Björn-Erik Höijer	Ragnvald Skrede
1968	Jan Fridegård	Rolf Jacobsen
1969	Sven Lindqvist	Olav H. Hauge
1970	Birgitta Trotzig	Kåre Holt
1971	Sivar Arnér	Stein Mehren
1972	Erik Beckman	Hans Børli
1973	Ivar Lo-Johansson	Øivind Bolstad
1974	Per E. Rundquist	Jens Bjørneboe
1975	Tora Dahl	Ragnhild Magerøy
1976	Sven Barthel	Sigbjørn Hølmebakk
1977	Margareta Ekström	Åsta Holth
1978	Tore Zetterholm	Harald Sverdrup
1979	Maria Gripe	Nils Johan Rud
1980	Sven Fagerberg	Magnhild Haalke
1981	Gunnar E. Sandgren	Paal Brekke
1982	P.C. Jersild	Gunvor Hofmo
1983	Sandro Key-Åberg	Marie Takvam
1984	Sven Rosendahl	Astrid Hjertenæs Andersen
1985	Bengt Anderberg	Arnljot Eggen
1985	Sara Lidman	Bergljot Hobæk Haff
1986	Lars Ardelius	Finn Carling
1986	Carl-Henning Wijkmark	Knut Hauge
1987	Carl-Göran Ekerwald	Paal-Helge Haugen
1987	Torgny Lindgren	Bjørg Vik
1988	Per Olov Enquist	Edvard Hoem
1988	Göran Sonnevi	Jan Erik Vold
1989	Ulla-Britta Lagerroth	Eldrid Lunden
1989	Birger Norman	Åge Rønning
1990	Sigrid Combüchen	Johannes Heggland
1990	Georg Klein	Cecilie Løveid
1991	Hans Granlid	Torill Thorstad Hauger
1991	Agneta Pleijel	Triztán Vindtorn
1992	Tobias Berggren	Arnold Eidslott
1992	Göran Printz-Påhlson	Øystein Lønn
1993	Madeleine Gustafsson	Lars Saabye Christensen
1993	Anna Westberg	Kolbein Falkeid
1994	Bertil Romberg	Inger Elisabeth Hansen
1994	Eva Runefelt	Tor Åge Bringsværd
1995	Per Agne Erkelius	Kjell Askildsen
1995	Rita Tornborg	Tor Ulven
1996	Inger Edelfeldt	Dag Solstad
1996	Lennart Sjögren	Wera Sæther
1997	Christer Eriksson	Kjartan Fløgstad
1997	Stig Larsson	Lars Amund Vaage
1998	Ulf Eriksson	Karsten Alnæs
1998	Klas Östergren	Ola Bauer
1999	Kristina Lugn	Jon Fosse
1999	Ole Söderström	Åse-Marie Nesse
2000	Louise Ekelund	Jan Kjærstad
2000	Per Odensten	Einar Økland
2001	Magnus Florin	Svein Jarvoll
2001	Birgitta Lillpers	Thorvald Steen
2002	Anne-Marie Berglund	Erling Kittelsen
2002	Claes Hylinger	Hanne Ørstavik
2003	Mare Kandre	Bjørn Aamodt
2003	Anders Palm	Rune Christiansen
2004	Ann Jäderlund	Trude Marstein
2004	Björn Ranelid	Marit Tusvik
2005	Lars Lönnroth	Hans Herbjørnsrud
2005	Steve Sem-Sandberg	Tone Hødnebø
2006	Carl Fehrman	Hanne Bramness
2006	Carola Hansson	Karin Gundersen
2007	Lars Furuland	Arvid Torgeir Lie
2007	Elisabeth Rynell	Jan Jakob Tønseth
2008	Niklas Rådström	Ragnar Hovland
2008	Johan Cullberg	Merethe Lindstrøm
2009	Ellen Mattson	Thure Erik Lund
2009	Ingela Strandberg	Gunnhild Øyehaug
2010	Martin Kylhammar	Øyvind Rimbereid
2010	Bruno K. Öijer	Arild Stubhaug
2011	Gunnar Harding	Knut Ødegård
2011	Daniel Hjorth	Beate Grimsrud
2012	Helena Eriksson	Roy Jacobsen
2012	Magnus Dahlström	Ellen Einan
2013	Lars Jakobson	Karin Moe
2013	Sara Stridsberg	Torgeir Rebolledo Pedersen
2014	Carl-Johan Malmberg	Britt Karin Larsen
2014	Björn Meidal	Torild Wardenær
2015	Peter Cornell	Kjersti Annesdatter Skomsvold
2015	Ylva Eggehorn	Ole Robert Sunde
2016	Kristina Sandberg	Inghill Johansen
2016	Mirja Unge	Per Petterson
2017	Theodor Kallifatides	Steinar Opstad
2017	Ulf Lundell	Linn Ullmann
2018	Johannes Anyuru	Helge Torvund
2018	Ida Börjel	Vigdis Hjorth
2019	Ernst Brunner	Johan Harstad
2019	Carin Franzén	Olaug Nilssen
2020	Lars Andersson	Nils Christian Moe-Repstad
2020	Peter Handberg	Carl Frode Tiller
2021	Arne Johnsson	Kjartan Hatløy
2021	Staffan Söderblom	Mona Høvring
2022	Per Odensten	Victoria Kielland
2022	Anna-Karin Palm	Lars Mytting
2023	Krister Gustavsson	Brit Bildøen
2023	Kerstin Norborg	Gunnar Wærness
2024	Jörgen Lind	Ingvild H. Rishøi
2024	Tony Samuelsson	Laila Stien
2025	Pär Hansson	Ingrid Storholmen
2025	Johan Jönson	Arne Lygre
2026	Eva-Stina Byggmästar	Matias Faldbakken
2026	Magnus Dahlström	Espen Stueland
