= Carin Franzén =

Swedish literary scholar (born 1962)

- Born: 1962 (age 63–64)
- Occupation: Literary scholar
- Employer: Stockholm University
- Awards: Dobloug Prize (2019)

Carin Franzén (born 1962) is a Swedish literary scholar and professor of comparative literature at Stockholm University. She graduated as dr.philos. in literary science in 1995, and was previously a professor of language and literature at the Linköping University. Her research focuses on the history of subjectivity in European literature from the premodern era to the present and is influenced by psychoanalytic criticism, gender studies and discourse theory.

In addition to her own research program, she has produced textbooks in literary theory and literary history. With Håkan Möller she was the co-editor of Natur & Kultur's Litteraturhistoria (2021), a Swedish-language history of world literature which has become the new standard reference work for the subject. With Möller, she is also producing the first comprehensive history of Swedish literature in forty years, to be published in 2028. She has also translated works from French into Swedish, including writings by Alain Badiou, Jacques Lacan, and Michel Foucault.

She was awarded the Swedish Academy's Dobloug Prize in 2019, along with Ernst Brunner, Johan Harstad and Olaug Nilssen.

== Bibliography ==
=== Authored Works ===
- Att översätta känslan. En studie i Julia Kristevas psykoanalytiska poetik (1995)
- I begynnelsen var ordet: essäer om den litterära erfarenheten (2002)
- För en litteraturens etik: en studie i Birgitta Trotzigs och Katarina Frostensons författarskap (2007)
- Till det omöjligas konst: essäer om litteratur och psykoanalys (2010)
- Jag gav honom inte min kärlek: om hövisk kärlek som kvinnlig strategi (2012)
- När vi talar om oss själva: nedslag i subjektivitetens historia från Montaigne till Norén (2018)
- Fritänkandet: Kvinnliga libertiner och en annan humanism (2023)

=== Edited Works ===
- Grundbok i litteraturvetenskap - Historia, praktik och teori (2015)
- Litteraturhistoria, eds. Carin Franzén, Håkan Möller (2021)
- Body, Gender, Senses: Subversive Expressions in Early Modern Art and Literature, eds. Carin Franzén, Johanna Vernqvist (2024)
- Lars Norén och filosofin, eds. Hans Ruin, Ulf Olsson, Carin Franzén (2025)
