= 1996 in Sweden =

- Decades: 1970s; 1980s; 1990s; 2000s; 2010s
- See also: Other events of 1996; Timeline of Swedish history

Events from the year 1996 in Sweden

== Incumbents ==
- Monarch – Carl XVI Gustaf
- Prime Minister – Ingvar Carlsson, succeeded by Göran Persson

== Events ==
- Connect/Disconnect one-act musical premieres in Gothenburg.
- Establishment of the Tresticklan National Park.

== Popular culture ==
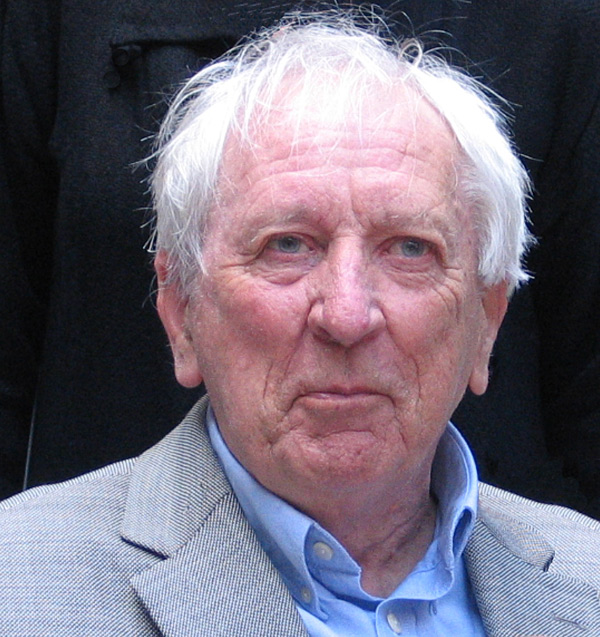
Tomas Tranströmer, winner of the August Prize in 1996.

=== Literature ===
- Sorgegondolen, poetry collection by Tomas Tranströmer, winner of the August Prize.

=== Film ===
- 25 December – Private Confessions released

=== Television ===
- Mysteriet på Greveholm
- Skilda världar, soap opera from 1996 to 2002
- Vänner och fiender, soap opera from 1996 to 2000
- Robin, cartoon series

=== Sports ===
- The 1996 Allsvenskan was won by IFK Göteborg
- At the 1996 Summer Olympics, Sweden had 177 participants, and achieved eight medals (2 gold, 4 silver, 2 bronze).

== Births ==
- 5 February – Stina Blackstenius, footballer
- 29 April – Gustav Engvall, football player
- 1 May – William Nylander, ice hockey player
- 6 July – Sandra Näslund, freestyle skier
- 18 July – Yung Lean, musician
- 28 August – Little Sis Nora, singer
- 10 October – Oscar Zia, singer

== Deaths ==
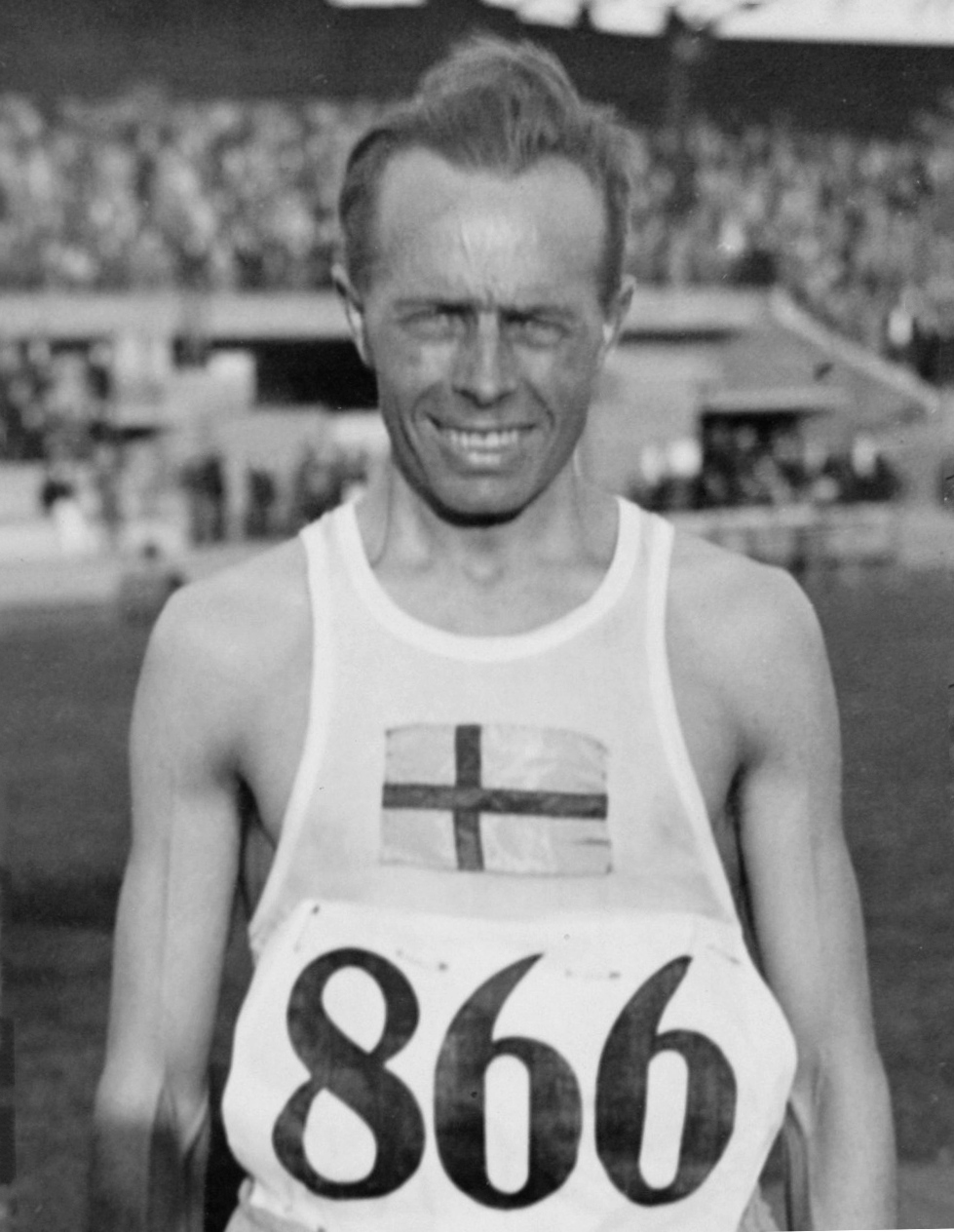
Edvin Wide, Olympic medalist 1920, 1924 and 1928

- 16 January – Kurt Svanström, football player (born 1915)
- 11 February – Olle Åhlund, football player (born 1920).
- 14 March – Maj Sønstevold, composer (born 1917).
- 23 March – Margit Manstad, actress. (born 1902)
- 28 April – Svea Holst, film actress (born 1901)
- 19 June – Edvin Wide, runner, Olympic medalist 1920, 1924 and 1928 (born 1896).
- 2 July – Ingvar Pettersson, athlete (born 1926)
- 13 September – Håkan Sundin, 54, Swedish bandy player
- 6 December – Olof Sundby, bishop, archbishop of Uppsala (born 1917)
- 12 December – Olle Tandberg, heavyweight boxer (born 1918)

== See also ==
- 1996 in Swedish television
