= Ulf Eriksson =

Ulf Eriksson may refer to:

- Ulf Eriksson (referee) (born 1942), Swedish referee
- Ulf Eriksson (footballer) (born 1958), Swedish international footballer
- Ulf Eriksson (author) (born 1958), Swedish writer and literary critic
- Ulf Eriksson (tennis), Swedish tennis player

== See also ==
- Eriksson
