= Svein Jarvoll =

Norwegian writer (1946–2026)

- Born: 5 May 1946; Lurøy, Helgeland, Norway
- Died: 18 February 2026 (aged 79)
- Occupations: Poet, novelist, short story writer, translator and essayist.
- Awards: Dobloug Prize (2001)

Svein Jarvoll (5 May 1946 – 18 February 2026) was a Norwegian poet, novelist, short story writer, translator and essayist. He made his debut with a poetry collection in 1984 and followed up with a postmodern novel, while most of his later books were essay collections and translations of ancient literature. He was awarded the Dobloug Prize in 2001.

== Life and career ==
Jarvoll was born on 5 May 1946 in Lurøy, in the district of Helgeland.

He made his literary début in 1984 with the poetry collection Thanatos. According to literary historian Øystein Rottem, Jarvoll's novel En australiareise from 1988 satisfies several of Patricia Waugh's characteristics of a postmodern text, as outlined in her work Metafiction: The Theory and Practice of Self-Conscious Fiction. The novel tells a number of stories in a rhapsodic manner, and contains references to ancient philosophy as well as the Bible and classics such as Dante and Joyce.

In 1990, he issued the short story collection Den ufullførte beretningen om Henry Glass og andre noveller. In 1993, he published Fragmenter, translation of works by Archilochus from Old Greek into Norwegian langue, and in 1995 the essays collection Melbourne-forelesningene. In an article in the literary magazine Vagant, Espen Grønlie called Melsom-forelesningene the best defence for classical bildung in Norwegian literature, and a book that for him split the time in a "before" and an "after". Jarvoll issued the essays collection Cornucopia jubilans eller Begeistringens overflødighetshorn in 1997.

In 2000, he issued translations of the Greek poet Sappho, and in 2001 the essays collection Et hvilket som helst glass vann. In a 2002 newspaper review Sigmund S. Jensen characterized Jarvoll as having an impressive ability to write well and interestingly about the most unimportant issues, such as any glass of water, or oranges, or colours. The collection also includes essays about Paal Brekke's poetry collection Det skjeve smil i rosa, and Robert Burton's book The Anatomy of Melancholy. He published the short story collection Ustadighet ustadighet in 2004.

In his literary history from 1998, Øystein Rottem compared Jarvoll with contemporary writers such as Ole Robert Sunde and Steinar Løding, and characterized his texts as a combination of abstract prose and concrete descriptions. A member of the Norwegian Authors' Union from 1989, Jarvoll for a period also chaired the literary council of the union. He was awarded the Dobloug Prize in 2001.

Jarvoll died on 18 February 2026, at the age of 79.
