= 2002 in Sweden =

- Decades: 1980s; 1990s; 2000s; 2010s; 2020s
- See also: Other events of 2002; Timeline of Swedish history

Events from the year 2002 in Sweden

== Incumbents ==
- Monarch – Carl XVI Gustaf
- Prime Minister – Göran Persson

== Events ==
=== January ===
- 1 January - Jan O. Karlsson replaces Maj-Inger Klingvall as Minister for International Development Cooperation and Minister for Migration.
- 1 January - Svensk Kassaservice is split from The Post and local post offices are closed down.
- 15 January - Ingegerd Wärnersson resigns as Minister for Schools.
- 16 January - Thomas Östros replaces Ingegerd Wärnersson as Minister for Schools.
- 18 January - Skanska is convicted of environmental crimes that occurred during the construction of Hallandsås Tunnel and is fined €300,000.
- 21 January - The murder of Fadime Sahindal takes place.
- 31 January - NCC admits that they have participated in Asphalt cartels.

=== February ===
- 20 February - The Palindrome Date occurred in Sweden at 20:02, 20:02 20–02–2002.
- 26 February - The Rinkeby murder took place.

=== March ===
- 3 March - Daniel Tynell from the Falun-Borlänge SK cross-country skiing club wins Vasaloppet.
- 6 March - Demoex is founded.

=== April ===
- 11 April - An earthquake occurs in Kusmark, Skellefteå, it is measured to 3.3 on the Richter magnitude scale.
- 18 April - The last episode of Rederiet is aired on SVT which ends a 10-year serial of 318 episodes.

=== May ===
- 12 May - Peter Eriksson and Maria Wetterstrand are elected leaders of the Green Party.

=== July ===
- 31 July - Tony Deogan, a supporter of IFK Göteborg, is severely injured in a hooligan fight with supporters of AIK in the Högalid Park in Stockholm.

=== August ===
- 14 August - The Cross Light Rail in Stockholm is extended from Gullmarsplan to Sicka Udde.
- 23 August - Västermalmsgallerian is inaugurated.

=== September ===
- 11 September - Marie Fredriksson collapses in her bathroom and after being rushed to Karolinska University Hospital is diagnosed with cancer after finding a brain tumor in her head.
- 15 September - The 2002 Swedish general election is held.
- 17 September - Fulufjället National Park is established.

=== November ===
- 18 November - Telia merges with Sonera and forms TeliaSonera.

=== December ===
- 21 December - A baby girl is found dead in an underpass Brunna, Kungsängen northwest of Stockholm.
- 28 December - Marcus Noren is murdered in an apartment in Halmstad by a 28 or 46-year-old suspect. His body is later dumped in Nissan.

== Deaths ==
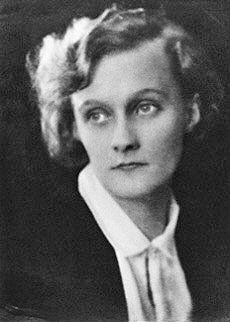
Astrid Lindgren.

- 11 January – Hilding Mickelsson, photographer (born 1919)
- 17 January – Eddie Meduza, composer and musician (born 1948)
- 21 January – Fadime Şahindal, student and politician (born 1975)
- 28 January – Astrid Lindgren, children's writer (born 1907)
- 4 February – Sigvard Bernadotte, industrial designer (born 1907)
- 19 February – Arne Selmosson, football player (born 1931)
- 10 March – Erik Lönnroth, historian (born 1910)
- 18 March – Gösta Winbergh, opera singer (born 1943)
- 29 April – Sune Andersson, footballer (born 1921)
- 7 June – Signe Hasso, actress, writer, composer (born 1915)
- 4 July – Sten Samuelson, architect (born 1926)
- 19 August – Jan Stenbeck, business leader, media pioneer, sailor and financier (born 1942)
- 28 October – Erling Persson, founder of H&M (born 1917)
- 6 November – Folke Frölén, horse rider (born 1908)
- 6 November – Maria Johansson, musician (born 1918)
- 10 November – Anne-Marie Brunius, actress (born 1916)
- 8 December – Gunnar Helén, politician (born 1918)
- 21 December – Kjell Larsson, politician (born 1943)
- 26 December – Åke Lindström, actor (born 1928)

== See also ==
- 2002 in Swedish television
