= Ulla-Britta Lagerroth =

Swedish literary critic (born 1927)

- Born: Ulla-Britta Holmström; 19 October 1927; Malmö, Sweden
- Died: 8 December 2021 (aged 94); Lund, Sweden
- Occupations: Literary scholar and literary critic
- Awards: Dobloug Prize

Ulla-Britta Lagerroth (née Holmström; 19 October 1927 – 8 December 2021) was a Swedish literary critic.

== Biography ==
Lagerroth was born in Malmö to Carl Holmström and Ingeborg Asp, and was married to Erland Lagerroth. Her academic career includes professorship at the University of Lund.

She was awarded the Dobloug Prize in 1989.

Lagerroth died on 8 December 2021.
