= Karl Asplund =

Swedish poet and writer (1890–1978)

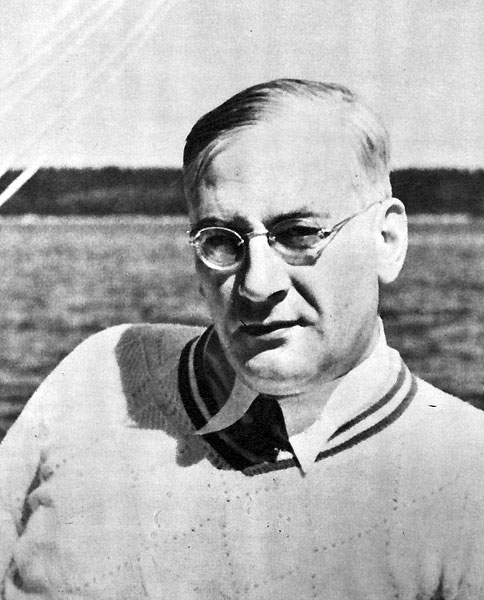
- Born: April 27, 1890
- Died: April 3, 1978 (aged 87)
- Occupations: Poet, short story writer and art historian
- Awards: Dobloug Prize (1955)

Karl Asplund (27 April 1890 – 3 April 1978) was a Swedish poet, short story writer and art historian. He made his literary debut in 1912, and was awarded the Dobloug Prize in 1955.
