= Carl Fehrman =

Swedish literary historian

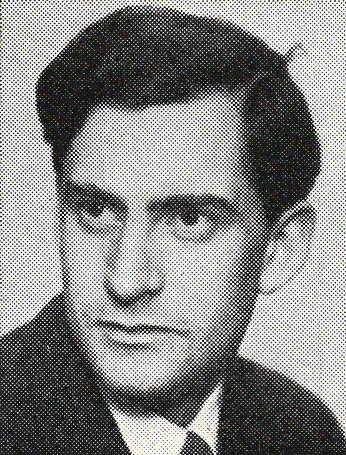
- Born: 3 February 1915; Lund, Sweden
- Died: 24 May 2010 (aged 95)
- Occupation: Literary historian
- Employer: University of Lund
- Awards: Dobloug Prize (2006)

Carl Abraham Daniel Fehrman (3 February 1915, in Lund – 24 May 2010, in Lund) was a Swedish literary historian. He was appointed professor at the University of Lund from 1958 to 1980. Among his works is Forskning i förvandling from 1972. He was awarded the Dobloug Prize in 2006. He was a member of the Norwegian Academy of Science and Letters.
