= Claes Hylinger =

Swedish writer

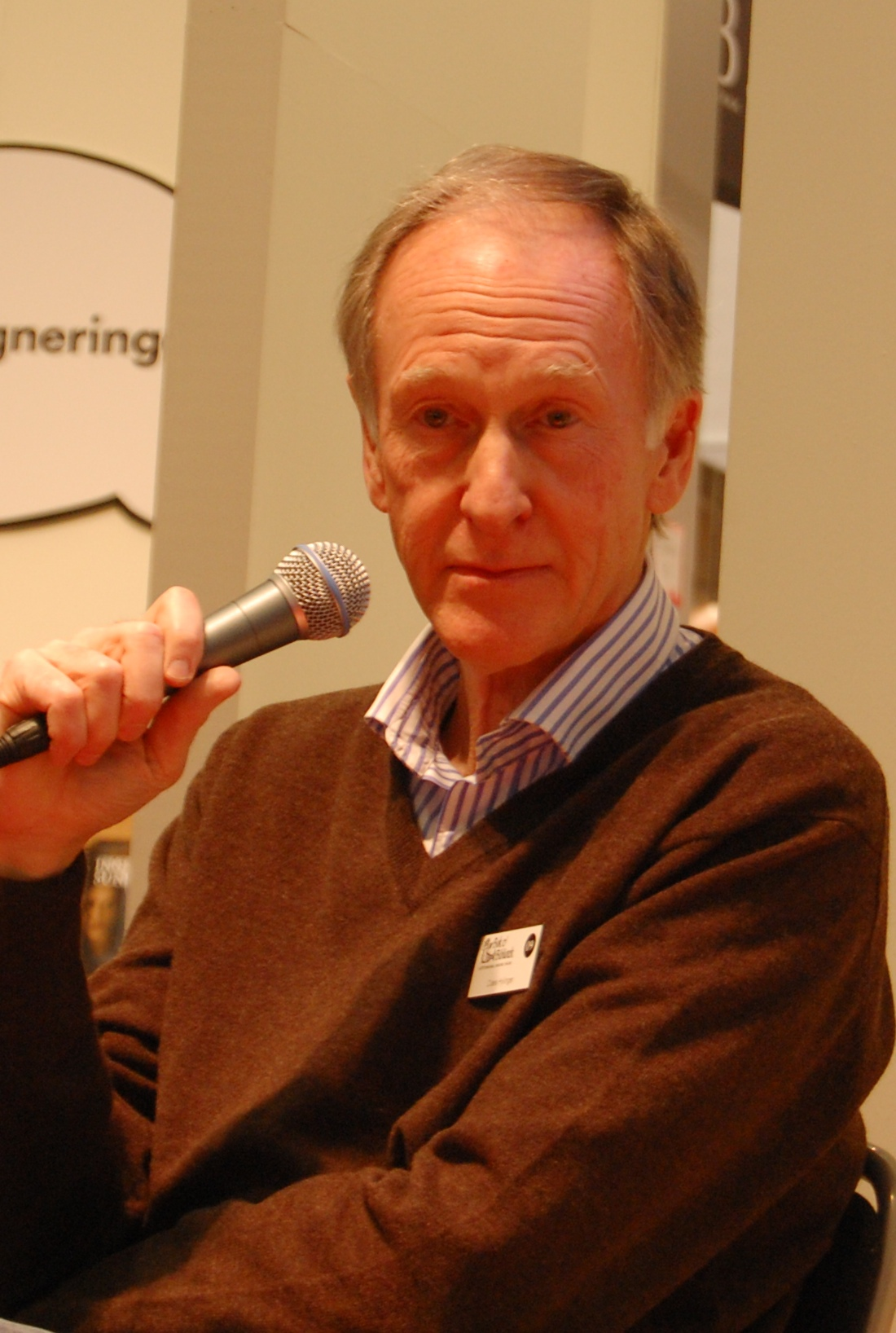
- Born: 1943 (age 82–83)
- Occupations: Novelist, essayist, poet and literary critic
- Awards: Dobloug Prize (2002)

Claes Hylinger (born 1943) is a Swedish novelist, essayist, poet and literary critic. He made his literary debut in 1972 with the novel I krig och kärlek. Among his other novels is Ett långt farväl from 1981. He was awarded the Dobloug Prize in 2002.

== Biography ==
Hylinger attended Hvitfeldtska high school, and became file in 1968. cand at the University of Gothenburg. He was a cultural journalist at Gothenburg Trade and Shipping Magazine 1968–1973, and since 1973 at Dagens Nyheter.

Hylinger debuted in 1972 with the novel in war and love. He is best known for his trilogy about "the secret company". It began in 1986 with the secret company, continued in 1990 with the big gathering and was completed in 2002 in the service of the secret company. Hylinger has published both novels, travelogues and more fragmentary books such as days and nights in Paris and Gothenburg (1975), new days and nights (1988) and hotel experience (2006).
