= Lars Furuland =

Swedish literary scientist

- Born: 1928
- Died: 1 December 2009 (aged 80–81)
- Occupation: literary scientist
- Awards: Dobloug Prize

Lars Furuland (1928 – 1 December 2009) was a Swedish literary scientist, a professor at Uppsala University.

In 1965 he was among the founders of the university's department of literary sociology. His publications include works on working class literature, as well as biographical works on Ivar Lo-Johansson and Vilhelm Moberg.

He was awarded the Dobloug Prize in 2007.
