= Tone Hødnebø =

Norwegian poet, translator and magazine editor

- Born: 5 November 1962 (age 64); Oslo, Norway
- Education: Philologist
- Occupations: Poet; Translator; Magazine editor
- Awards: Dobloug Prize (2005)

Tone Hødnebø (born 5 November 1962) is a Norwegian poet, translator and magazine editor.

== Literary career ==
Born in Oslo on 5 November 1962, Hødnebø made her literary début in 1989 with the poetry collection Larm. She was a co-editor of the magazine Vagant from 1990 to 1997. Literary historian Øystein Rottem compared her poetic style in her next collection, Mørkt kvadrat from 1994, with poets such as Rolf Jacobsen and Sigbjørn Obstfelder. Later collections include Pendel (1997), Stormstigen (2002), Nedtegnelser (2007), and Nytte og utførte gjerninger (2016). She has also translated poetry by Emily Dickinson and Anne Carson into Norwegian language.

Hødnebø was awarded Sult-prisen in 2003, and the Dobloug Prize in 2005. She received Gyldendalprisen in 2018 (for 2017).

== Early and personal life ==
Hødnebø was born in Oslo in 1962, and is educated as philologist.
