= Daniel Hjorth =

Swedish literary scholar and publisher (1931–2020)

- Born: 18 July 1931; Malmö, Sweden
- Died: 5 March 2020 (aged 88); Falsterbo
- Occupations: Publisher; Literary critic
- Awards: Dobloug Prize (2011)

Daniel Hjorth (18 July 1931 – 5 March 2020) was a Swedish literary scholar and publisher.

== Career ==
Hjorth graduated as fil.lic. in 1961. He was assigned with Albert Bonniers Förlag from 1958, where he assumed various editorial positions. He was a literary critic for the newspaper Sydsvenskan from 1951 to 1956, and for Bonniers litterära magasin in 1955, Dagens Nyheter 1957, and for Svenska Dagbladet from 1975.

His works include Bifugurer (1980), Kakafoni (1984), Excelsior (1987), Passanter (1990), and Poesiens udde (2010).

He was awarded the Dobloug Prize in 2011.

== Personal life and death ==
Hjort was born in Malmö on 18 July 1931, a son of Gustav Hjorth and Anna-Lisa Ahlström. He died in Falsterbo on 5 March 2020.
