= Tora Dahl =

Swedish teacher and novelist

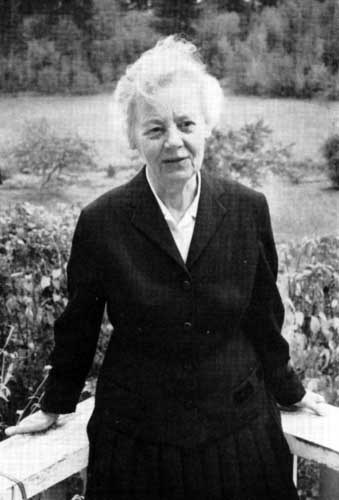
- Born: 9 June 1886; Stockholm, Sweden
- Died: 30 January 1982 (aged 95)
- Occupations: Teacher and novelist
- Awards: Dobloug Prize (1975)

Tora Armida Dahl (9 June 1886 – 30 January 1982) was a Swedish teacher and novelist. She was married to literary critic Knut Jaensson. Among her novels is Fosterbarn from 1954. She was awarded the Dobloug Prize in 1975.

== Personal life ==
Dahl was born in Stockholm on 9 June 1896, a daughter of architect Theodor Dahl and baker Emma Nilsdotter, and grew up with a foster mother in Nacka until the age of 11, when she moved to live with her mother. In 1914, she married Knut Jaensson, who initially could live off his inheritance from his father, and eventually became a literary critic. She died on 9 January 1982. Outside Vilan's school at the foot of the Danvikshem is a magnolia tree that Dahl donated in 1979 after she received the Magnolia Award from the Sofia Home Society. The magnolia was destroyed in 2010, but was replanted by the Nacka Hembygdsförening in 2011. Here, residents celebrate Magnolia Day in memory of the author at the end of April/May.
