= Hans Granlid =

Swedish writer

- Born: 22 December 1926
- Died: 10 May 1999 (aged 72)
- Occupations: Novelist and literary researcher
- Awards: Dobloug Prize (1991)

Hans Granlid (22 December 1926 – 10 May 1999) was a Swedish novelist and literary researcher. Among his novels are Nertrappning from 1969, and Hotellsaga from 1972. He was awarded the Dobloug Prize in 1991.
