= Hanne Bramness =

Norwegian poet and translator

- Born: 3 April 1959 (age 66); Oslo, Norway
- Occupations: Poet and translator
- Awards: Dobloug Prize (2006)

Hanne Bramness (born 3 April 1959) is a Norwegian poet and translator.

== Career ==
Born in Oslo on 3 April 1959, Bramness graduated as cand.mag. from the University of Oslo in 1984. She made her literary debut in 1983 with the poetry collection Korrespondanse. Other collections are I sin tid from 1986, Nattens kontinent from 1992, and Revolusjonselegier from 1996. She has translated English, Chinese and Japanese poetry into Norwegian language. She was awarded the Dobloug Prize in 2006.
