= Ragnhild Magerøy =

Norwegian novelist, essayist and poet

- Born: 3 July 1920; Fræna Municipality, Norway
- Died: 16 November 2010 (aged 90)
- Occupations: Novelist, essayist and poet
- Awards: Dobloug Prize (1975)

Ragnhild Magerøy (9 July 1920 – 16 November 2010) was a Norwegian novelist, essayist and poet. She is principally known as a historical novelist.

== Biography ==
Magerøy was born at Fræna Municipality in Møre og Romsdal as the youngest of six siblings. In 1958 she moved with her family to Oslo where she was given the opportunity to study historical material at the University of Oslo Library. She became focused in historic but often forgotten female figures. Her female characters are often high-spirited and center to the plot.

She made her literary début in 1957 with the novel Gunhild, the first volume of a novel trilogy about the lives of women in a small rural village in the 19th century. Her subsequent novels were often placed within the Norwegian Medieval Period. She was awarded the Dobloug Prize in 1975.

== Selected works ==
- Dronning uten rike, 1966
- Mens nornene spinner, 1969
- Himmelen er gul, 1970
- Spotlight på sagaen, 1991
- Den hvite steinen, 1995
- Hallfrid, 1997
