= Johan Cullberg =

Swedish psychiatrist (1934–2022)

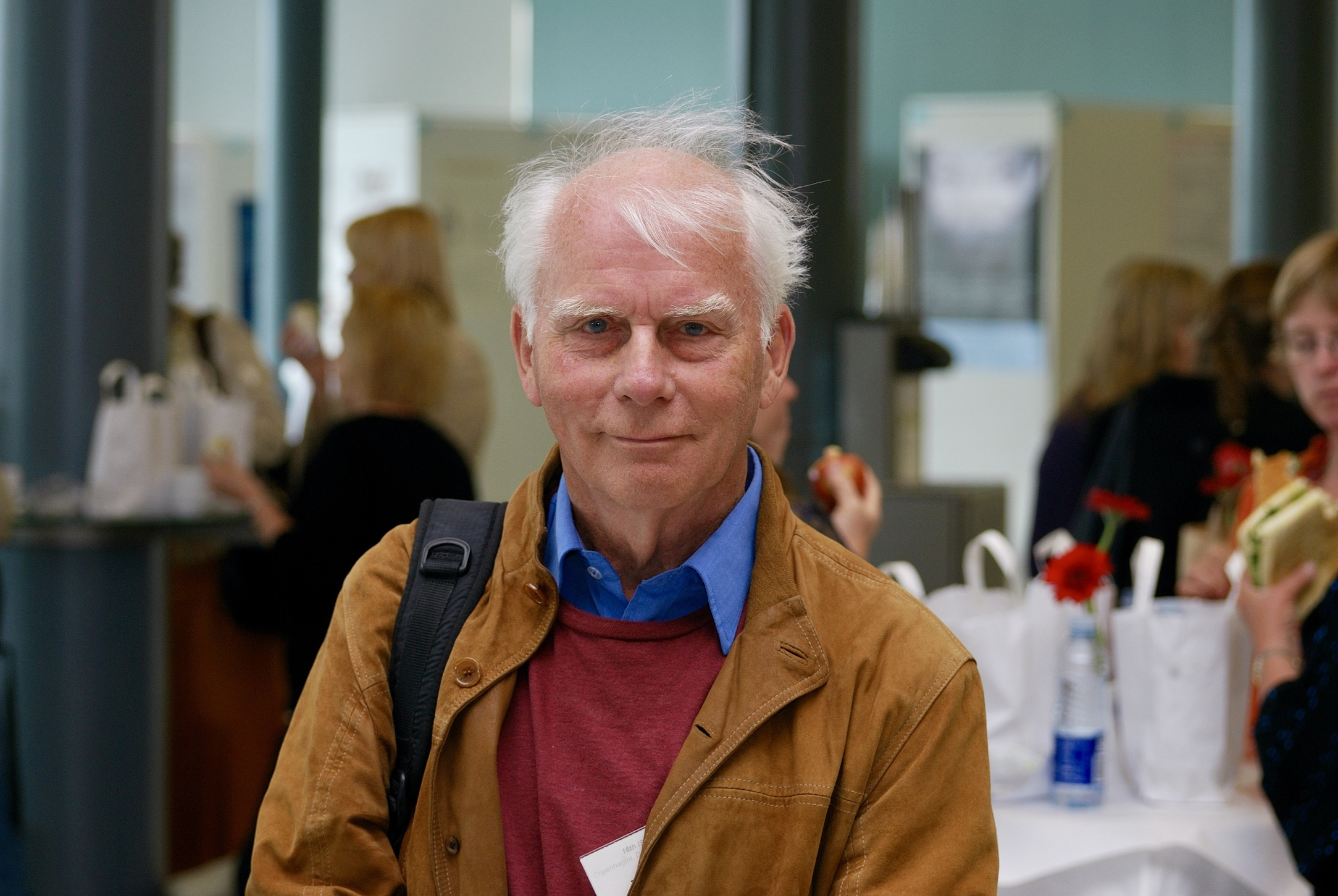
Johan Cullberg at the 2009 ISPS International conference held in Copenhagen, Denmark

Johan Cullberg (6 January 1934 – 14 June 2022) was a Swedish professor in psychiatry and psychology, researcher, psychoanalyst, and author of a number of internationally recognised textbooks.

== Career ==
He started his career at the department of gynecology at the Karolinska University Hospital, Karolinska Institute, in Stockholm studying the effects of birth control. He became head of one of the outpatient clinics in the Nacka Project, doing groundbreaking work on psychiatric care outside the hospital in Sweden. He was recognised for advocacy of lower doses of antipsychotic medicine, reduction in compulsory treatment and more humane psychiatric care. He was awarded the Dobloug Prize (Swedish: Doblougska Priset), a literature prize awarded by the Swedish Academy in 2008.

== Bibliography (partial) ==
- Crisis and Development (1975) (revised 1992)
- Cullberg, Johan (September 1991). "Recovered versus non-recovered schizophrenic patients among those who have had intensive psychotherapy". Acta Psychiatrica Scandinavica. 84 (3): 242–245. doi:10.1111/j.1600-0447.1991.tb03137.x. PMID 1950624. S2CID 37533906.
- Creating Crisis (1992) ISBN 91-27-06697-5
- Dynamic Psychiatry in Theory and Practice (1993) ISBN 9127035719
- Mänskliga gränsområden - About extase, psykos and gale creation. Johan Cullberg, Karin Johannisson, and Owe Wikström (red). (1996) ISBN 91-27-05831-X
- Psychoses, a humanist and biological perspective (2000) ISBN 91-27-07972-4
- Evolving Psychosis (International Society for the Psychological Treatment of Schizophrenia and Other Psychoses) (2006) Johan Cullberg with Jan Olav Johannessen, and Brian V. Martindale ISBN 978-1-58391-992-7
- My psychiatric life, Memoires (2007)
