= 2001 in Sweden =

- Decades: 1980s; 1990s; 2000s; 2010s; 2020s
- See also: Other events of 2001; Timeline of Swedish history

Events from the year 2001 in Sweden

== Incumbents ==
- Monarch – Carl XVI Gustaf
- Prime Minister – Göran Persson

== Events ==
=== January ===
- 1 January - The name day list is updated.
- 1 January - The Swedish Defence Research Agency is established.
- 6 January - Landskrona Station is opened.
- 16 January - The music concert Artister mot nazister is held in Globen.
- 18 January - Nicola Vasmatzis is shot dead in a restroom at Bromma Gymnasium in Stockholm.
- 19 January - Lennart Daleus resigns as leader of the Centre Party.

=== February ===
- 11 February - Several houses from the 18th century burn down on the Arkadien block in eastern Jönköping.

=== March ===
- 7 March - The Minister of Commerce and Industry Leif Pagrotsky and the Member of the European Parliament Marit Paulsen each get a cake thrown at their necks at a debate evening in Lund.
- 15 March - The Alcohol Committee is established.
- 19 March - Maud Olofsson is elected leader of the Centre Party at a party conference. After the 2002 election, the Centre Party's first electoral upturn since 1973 was attributed to the "Maud effect."
- 25 March - Sweden joins the Schengen Area.

=== April ===
- 17 April - The Minister for Finance Bosse Ringholm is caked by a 21-year-old member of the Stockholm Cake Brigade when making the budget walk on Drottninggatan.

=== May ===
- 22 May - The Stockholm Convention on Persistent Organic Pollutants is signed in Stockholm.
- 29 May - Norrtåg is founded.

=== June ===
- 14 June - 16 June - A European Council meeting is held in Gothenburg which causes the Gothenburg Riots.

=== July ===
- 1 July - A new citizenship law is put into effect which allows Multiple citizenship.
- 28 July - 5 August - Sweden's first major and international scout camp, SCOUT 2001, is held in Rinkaby, Kristianstad.
- 31 July - Nordea buys Postgirot.

=== August ===
- 1 August - The People's Park in Karlskoga burns down.
- 15 August - Christina Jutterström becomes new CEO for SVT.

=== September ===
- 5 September - The Kolbäck Bridge in Umeå is opened.
- 11 September - A massive flood originating from the Selånger River destroys parts of Sundsvall.
- 15 September - Löfbergs Arena in Karlstad is opened.
- 16 September - The 2001 Church of Sweden elections are held.

=== October ===
- 21 October - Hammarby Fotboll win their first gold in Swedish Championship in football.

=== November ===
- 12 November - One of Sweden's oldest churches Södra Råda Old Church in Gullspång burns down after an arson attack by a 23-year-old murderer.

=== December ===
- 6 December - The Carlbeck Committee is established.
- 10 December - The Nobel Prize turns 100 and 161 previous winners are invited for its birthday party.
- 18 December - The Repatriation of Ahmed Agiza and Muhammad al-Zery takes place.
- 31 December - Jan Malmsjö reads Ring Out, Wild Bells at Skansen due to Margaretha Krooks death.

== Popular culture ==
=== Film ===
- 24 October – Deadline, directed by Colin Nutley, released in Sweden
- Buy Bye Beauty, documentary film directed by Pål Hollender

=== Sports ===
- 24 March-1 April – The Bandy World Championship 2001 for men was played in Sweden and Finland

== Births ==
- 19 June – William Hansson, alpine ski racer.

== Deaths ==
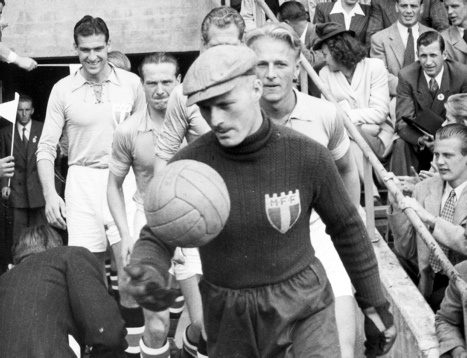
Helge Bengtsson, goalkeeper nicknamed "Gripen".

- 10 February – Helge Bengtsson, footballer (born 1916)
- 21 February – Philip Sandblom, sailor (born 1903).
- 23 April – Lennart Atterwall, javelin thrower (born 1911).
- 4 May – Arne Sucksdorff, film director (born 1917).
- 7 May – Margaretha Krook, stage and film actress (born 1925).
- 27 May – Agda Rössel, politician and diplomat (born 1910)
- 16 September – Ann-Margret Ahlstrand, athlete (born 1905)
- 9 November – Tore Zetterholm, novelist, playwright and journalist (born 1915).
- 10 November – Carl-Gustav Esseen, mathematician (born 1918)
- 12 December – Berit Granquist, fencer (born 1909)
