= Jayne Svenungsson =

Swedish theologian and writer (born 1973)

- Born: 9 December 1973 (age 52); Trollhättan, Sweden
- Occupations: Theologian and philosopher
- Employer: Lund University
- Title: Professor of Systematic Theology
- Partner: Göran Rosenberg

Member of the Swedish Academy (Seat No. 9)
- In office 20 December 2017 – 7 November 2018
- Preceded by: Torgny Lindgren
- Succeeded by: Ellen Mattson

Jayne Christine Svenungsson (born 9 December 1973) is a Swedish theologian and philosopher who holds the chair in Systematic Theology at Lund University. Her field of research lies within political theology, aesthetics and the philosophy of history.

In September 2017, Svenungsson was elected as a member of the Swedish Academy. She was installed on 20 December 2017, succeeding Torgny Lindgren on seat 9. She left the Academy on 7 November 2018.

== Prizes and elected memberships ==
- Per Beskow Prize for contributing to the dialogue between theology, society and culture in the public sphere, 2014.
- The Nine Society's Christmas Prize, 2014.
- Karin Gierow Prize (awarded by the Swedish Academy) for contributions to the dissemination of bildung, 2015.
- Vetenskapssocieteten i Lund (The New Society of Letters at Lund), since 2017.
- Kungliga Humanistiska Vetenskapssamfundet i Lund (The Royal Society of Letters at Lund), since 2018.
- Det Norske Videnskaps-Akademi (The Norwegian Academy of Science and Letters), since 2022.

== Selected works ==
=== As author ===
- Guds återkomst: En studie av gudsbegreppet inom postmodern filosofi, 2004, ISBN 9789197457521
- Den gudomliga historien: Profetism, messianism och andens utveckling, 2014, ISBN 9789186133559. Translated into English as Divining History: Prophetism, Messianism and the Development of the Spirit, 2016, ISBN 9781785331732

=== As editor or co-editor ===
- Postmodern teologi: En introduktion, 2006, ISBN 9152647188
- Systematisk teologi: En introduktion, 2007, ISBN 9789152631492
- Jewish Thought, Utopia and Revolution, 2014, ISBN 9789042038332
- Monument and Memory, 2015, ISBN 9783643904676
- Heidegger’s Black Notebooks and the Future of Theology, 2017, ISBN 9783319649276
- The Ethos of History: Time and Responsibility, 2018, ISBN 9781785338847
- Vänskap/Friendship: Festschrift för Arne Rasmusson, 2021, ISBN 9789198634907

Cultural offices
Preceded by Torgny Lindgren	Swedish Academy, Seat No 9; 2017–2018	Succeeded by Ellen Mattson
