= Per Agne Erkelius =

Swedish novelist, playwright and teacher

- Born: 1935
- Died: 24 February 2010 (aged 74–75)
- Occupations: Novelist, playwright and teacher
- Awards: Dobloug Prize (1995)

Per Agne Erkelius (1935 – 24 February 2010) was a Swedish novelist, playwright and teacher. He made his literary debut in 1961, with the novel Städerna vid havet. Other novels are Fotografen from 1976 and Rembrandt til sin dotter from 1998. He was awarded the Dobloug Prize in 1995.
