= Ellen Mattson =

Swedish writer (born 1962)

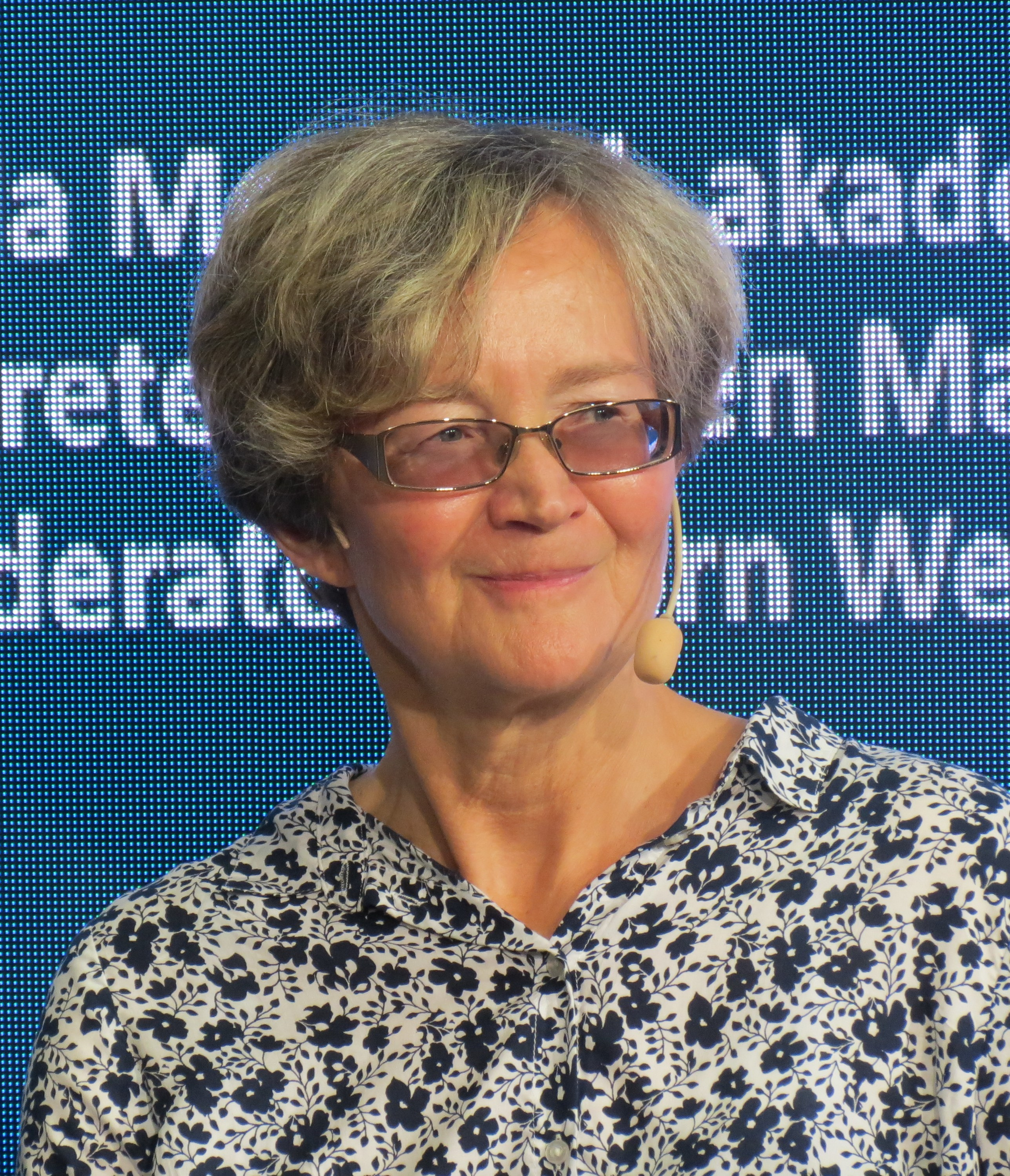
- Born: 22 September 1962 (age 63); Uddevalla, Sweden
- Awards: Dobloug Prize (2009); Selma Lagerlöf Prize for Literature (2011)

Member of the Swedish Academy (Seat No. 9)
- Incumbent
- Assumed office 20 December 2019
- Preceded by: Jayne Svenungsson

Ellen Mattson (born 22 September 1962) is a Swedish novelist, playwright and literature critic, and a member of the Swedish Academy.

Mattson was born in Uddevalla. She studied literature and language, and also piano at a folk high school in Vadstena. She is a trained librarian, but now works as a full time writer and literature critic.

Mattson debuted as a novelist in 1992. She won a wider audience and critical acclaim with the 1998 novel Resenärerna ("The Travelers"). Several of her works are historical novels, including Vinterträdet ("The Winter Tree", 2012), in which she portray Greta Garbo at the height of her international film career, Snö ("Snow", 2001) and Tornet och fåglarna ("The Tower and the Birds", 2017), which are both set in the early 18th century. Snow, which depict the time after the Swedish army's return from Norway after the death of king Karl XII, was Mattson's first fictional work to be published in English translation (2005). Mattson has also written plays for radio and the stage. The main theme in Mattson's work is human relations and the question of the individual's freedom.

Mattson has won several literary prizes, including the Svenska Dagbladet Literature Prize in 1998, the Dobloug Prize in 2009, and the Selma Lagerlöf Prize in 2011.

On 28 March 2019, the Swedish Academy elected Mattson as a new member of the academy and was inducted on seat 9 on 20 December 2019. She is currently a member of the Academy's Nobel Committee for Literature.

== Selected works ==
- Truman Capote och faktaromanen (Thesis at Högskolan i Borås) 1989
- Nattvandring 1992
- Vägen härifrån 1994
- Resenärerna 1998
- Poetens liv 1999
- Snö 2001 (English translation: Snow 2005)
- Splendorville 2004
- Arves hus 2005
- Glädjestranden 2008
- Vinterträdet 2012
- Tornet och fåglarna 2017
- Den svarta månens år 2022

Cultural offices
Preceded by Jayne Svenungsson	Swedish Academy, Seat No 9; 2019–	Succeeded by incumbent
