= Birger Vikström =

Swedish writer

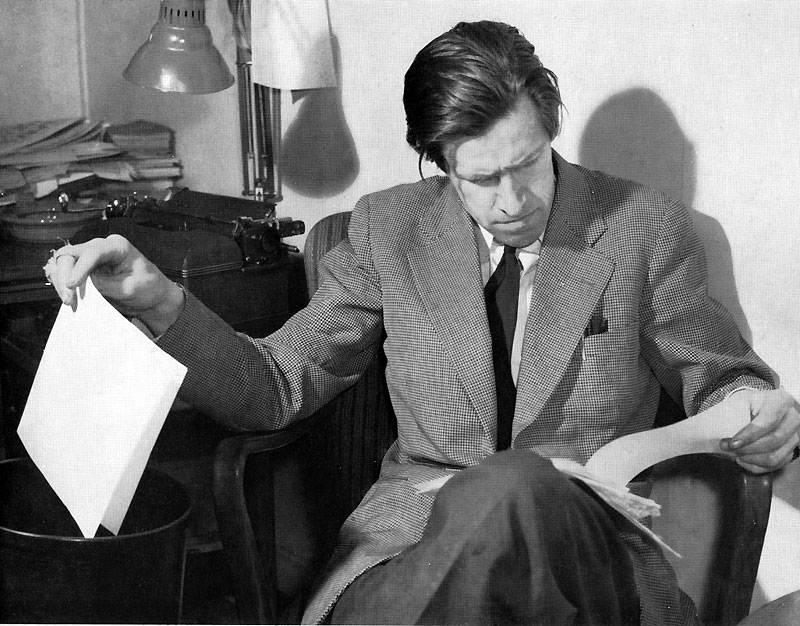
- Born: Frans Birger Eugen Vikström; 24 September 1921; Bredåker, Norrbotten County, Sweden
- Died: 22 December 1958 (aged 37); Stockholm, Sweden
- Occupations: Writer, illustrator
- Writing career
- Period: 1948–1958

Frans Birger Eugen Vikström (24 September 1921 – 22 December 1958) was a Swedish writer and illustrator.

== Biography ==
Vikström was born in Bredåker outside Boden in Norrbotten County, but grew up in the village Granbergsträsk outside Jörn in Västerbotten County. His father died when Vikström was a small child, and his mother when he was 14, which led to Vikström having to take care of himself from a young age. He took several odd jobs, working as a lumberjack and a farm laborer amongst other things. Vikström also sold the communist newspaper Norrskensflamman around 1939–1940, which led to him being arrested on multiple occasions and having more difficulties finding employment. While performing his mandatory military service in 1942, Vikström started writing. After studying at Brunnsvik folk high school in Dalarna from 1945 until 1946, he moved to Stockholm.

In Stockholm, Vikström settled in the Klara district. He made his literary debut with Gyllene tider, a collection of short stories, in 1948. In 1954, he was awarded the Svenska Dagbladet Literature Prize. A very productive writer, Vikström published nearly one book of poems, short stories or novels a year from his debut in 1948, often featuring his own illustrations.

Vikström died of tuberculosis in 1958, aged only 37. Several of his writings were published posthumously.

== Bibliography ==
- 1948 – Gyllene tider
- 1949 – Att vara dräng
- 1950 – I stället för rakblad
- 1950 – Staden
- 1953 – Egna historier
- 1954 – De lyckliga åren
- 1956 – Dubbelkrut (och hans pirater) eller det ödesdigra djungelkriget
- 1958 – 13 historier
- 1959 – Den svenska människan
- 1975 – Bilder
- 1980 – I sällskap med Birger Vikström
- 2001 – En underlig roman och andra berättelser
- 2010 – De lyckliga åren (reissue)
- 2010 – Dubbelkrut (reissue)
- 2011 – Mitt namn är Birger Vikström. Så enkelt är mitt elände!
