= Kjartan Hatløy =

Norwegian poet

- Born: 16 February 1954 (age 72); Hyllestad Municipality, Norway
- Occupation: Poet
- Awards: Dobloug Prize (2021)

Kjartan Hatløy (born 16 February 1954) is a Norwegian poet, and winner of the Dobloug Prize 2021.

== Career ==
Hatløy made his literary debut in 1996 with the poetry collection Solreven, a collection of short poems reflecting on aspects of nature. Later collections are Fjord from 2011, and Kjøkkendikt from 2012. With Kjøkkendikt he reached a wider public, and the collection was nominated for the Brage Prize. In 2016 he issued Den kvite vegen, and Menneskedagar came in 2018.

He was awarded the literary prize Diktartavla in 2015, and the Dobloug Prize in 2021. In 2017 he was featured in the German documentary film Der Sonnenfuchs.

== Personal life ==
Born on 16 February 1954, Hatløy grew up in Hyllestad Municipality, and later settled in the village of Sørbøvågen. His background includes studies in philosophy at the University of Bergen, education as plumber, and working experience from the shipping industry.

Hatløy is the uncle of fellow Norwegian author Karl Ove Knausgård, being a brother to his mother. As such, Hatløy is present in several parts of Knausgård's autobiographical novel 'My Struggle'.
