= Göran Printz-Påhlson =

Swedish writer (1931–2006)

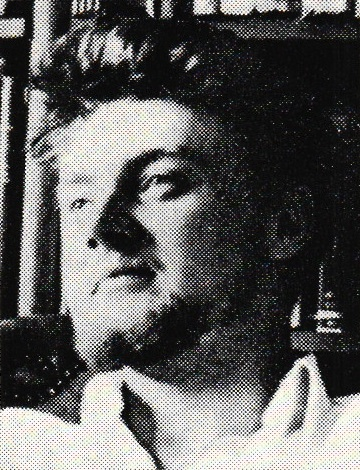
- Born: 31 March 1931; Hässleholm, Sweden
- Died: 27 July 2006 (aged 75); Malmö, Sweden
- Education: Lund University
- Occupations: Poet, essayist, translator, lecturer and literary critic
- Years active: 1955–1995
- Employer: Cambridge University
- Awards: Dobloug Prize (1992)

Ulf Göran Reidar Printz-Påhlson (1931–2006) was a Swedish poet essayist, translator and literary critic. Among his essay collections are Solen i spegeln from 1958 and Appendiks from 1960. He was awarded the Dobloug Prize in 1992. He held academic posts at the University of Cambridge, Harvard University, and elsewhere.
