= Nils Christian Moe-Repstad =

Norwegian poet

- Born: 1 February 1972 (age 54); Kristiansand, Norway
- Died: 15 September 2022 (aged 50); Kristiansand
- Occupation: Poet
- Writing career
- Period: 1996–2022
- Genre: Poetry
- Notable awards: Dobloug Prize (2020)

Nils Christian Moe-Repstad (1 February 1972 – 15 September 2022) was a Norwegian poet. He received the Dobloug Prize in 2020.

== Career ==
Moe-Repstad made his literary début in 1996 with the poetry collection Nå. His poetry collection Sannheten og andre konstruksjoner earned him the Sørlandet Literary Prize. Among his other poetry collections are Teori om det eneste from 2013 and Wunderkammer from 2016, which were both nominated for the Brage Prize.

He was awarded the Dobloug Prize in 2020.

== Personal life ==
Born in Kristiansand on 1 February 1972, Moe-Repstad suffered from paraplegia due to a diving accident at the age of 19.

Moe-Repstad died in Kristiansand on 15 September 2022, at the age of 50.
