= Lars Ardelius =

Swedish psychologist and novelist (1926–2012)

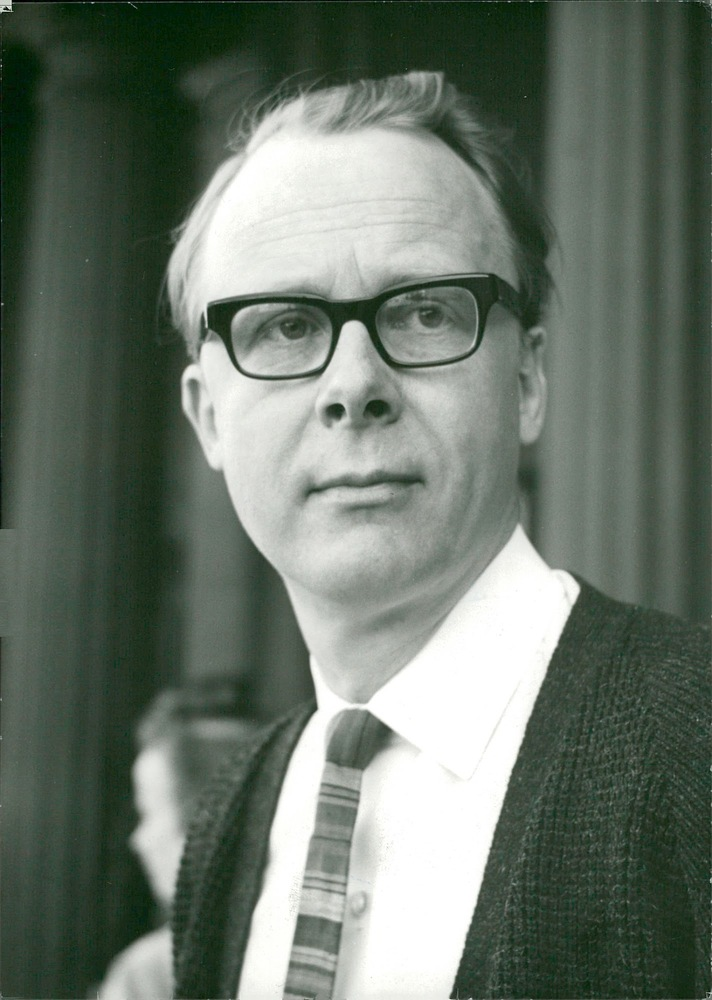
- Born: 1 November 1926
- Died: 23 July 2012 (aged 85)
- Occupations: Psychologist and novelist
- Awards: Dobloug Prize (1986)

Lars Ardelius (1 November 1926 – 23 July 2012) was a Swedish psychologist and novelist. He was born in Falun, lived in Stockholm and died in Visby.

Ardelius made his literary debut in 1958. Among his novels are Och kungen var kung from 1976, Tid och otid from 1978, and Provryttare from 1981. He chaired the Swedish Authors' Union from 1982 to 1984. He was awarded the Dobloug Prize in 1986.

== Bibliography ==
- Dagligt allehanda, 1958
- Mått och steg, 1959
- Krafter och spel, 1962
- Svävningar, 1963
- Rök, 1964
- Spritt språngande, 1965
- Plagiat, 1968
- Gösta Berglunds saga, 1970
- Kronprinsarna, 1972
- Smorgasbordet, 1974 (essays)
- Och kungen var kung, 1976 (historic novel, part II, 19th century)
- Tid och otid, 1978 (historic novel, part III, 20th century)
- Provryttare, 1981 (historic novel, part IV, 20th century)
- Nya Drömboken, 1982 (essays)
- Ogjort, 1983
- Större än störst, 1985
- Barnsben, 1986
- De små sändebuden, 1987
- Skjuta i höjden, 1988
- Sällskapsdjuret, 1989
- Slutet; om dödens höghet och låghet, 1990 (together with P.C. Jersild)
- Livtag, 1991
- Kurage!, 1993
- Resandets ensak, 1995 (essays)
- Bitvargen, 1997 (självbiografi del IV)
- Lilla sockerstunden, 1998 (4 långa noveller)
- Världens ställe - herrgårdsroman, 2000
- Ett hål i naturen, essäer om konst, 2002
- Ingen ålder, 2003
- Den helande skuggan, 2003
- Hammarens slag och hjärtats, 2004
- En lyckad begravning 2005
- I vitögat (2006)
- Där Satan rullar i sanden 2008
- Privata liv 2009
- Livs levande, 2010
