= Bengt Anderberg =

Swedish writer (1920–2008)

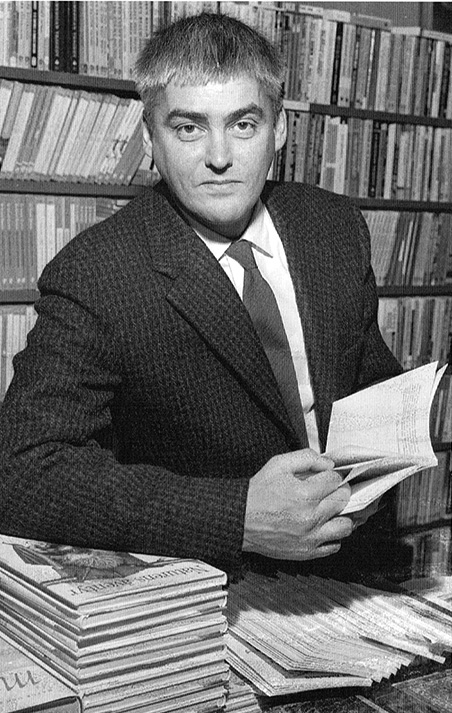
- Born: 17 April 1920; Gothenburg, Sweden
- Died: 24 September 2008 (aged 88); Rønne, Denmark
- Occupations: Poet, novelist, children's writer and playwright
- Spouse: Astrid Anderberg (1927-2010)
- Awards: Svenska Dagbladet Literature Prize (1946); Boklotteriets stipendier till översättare (1951); Dobloug Prize (1985); Elsa Thulins översättarpris (1998)

Bengt Anderberg (17 April 1920 – 24 September 2008) was a Swedish poet, novelist, editor and playwright.

== Biography ==
Bengt Nikolas Anderberg was born in the neighborhood of Lundby in Gothenburg, Sweden. From 1947 he was a regular critic for Bonniers litterära magasin and from 1950 for the cultural department of the newspaper Expressen over a 48-year career. He was also a frequent collaborator in diverse subjects which appeared in Expressen. Anderberg translated many collections of poems and plays and was a prolific translator of drama, both for radio and for the stage.

He made his literary debut in 1945 with the short story collection En kväll om våren. His novel Kain from 1948 led to a fierce debate. He was editor-in-chief and also among the contributors to the 14 volume Kärlek, a series of erotic short story anthologies published between 1965 and 1970 by the Malmö-based book publisher Forsbergs förlag. The first two had editions in English at Grove Press in 1969 as Love 1 and 2, Erotic Tales From Sweden and Denmark.

== Awards ==
He was awarded the Svenska Dagbladet Literature Prize (1946), Boklotteriets stipendier till översättare (1951), Dobloug Prize (1985) and the Elsa Thulins översättarpris (1998).

== Legacy ==
In 2014, the Bengt Anderberg Society was formed, which will work for the spread of the author's texts. It claims to be the only literary company based in Gothenburg.

== Personal life ==
He was married from 1947 to artist and ceramist Astrid Anderberg (1927-2010). Together with his wife, he lived for many years on the Danish island of Bornholm. He died at Rønne in 2008.
