= Ulf Eriksson (author) =

Swedish writer and literary critic

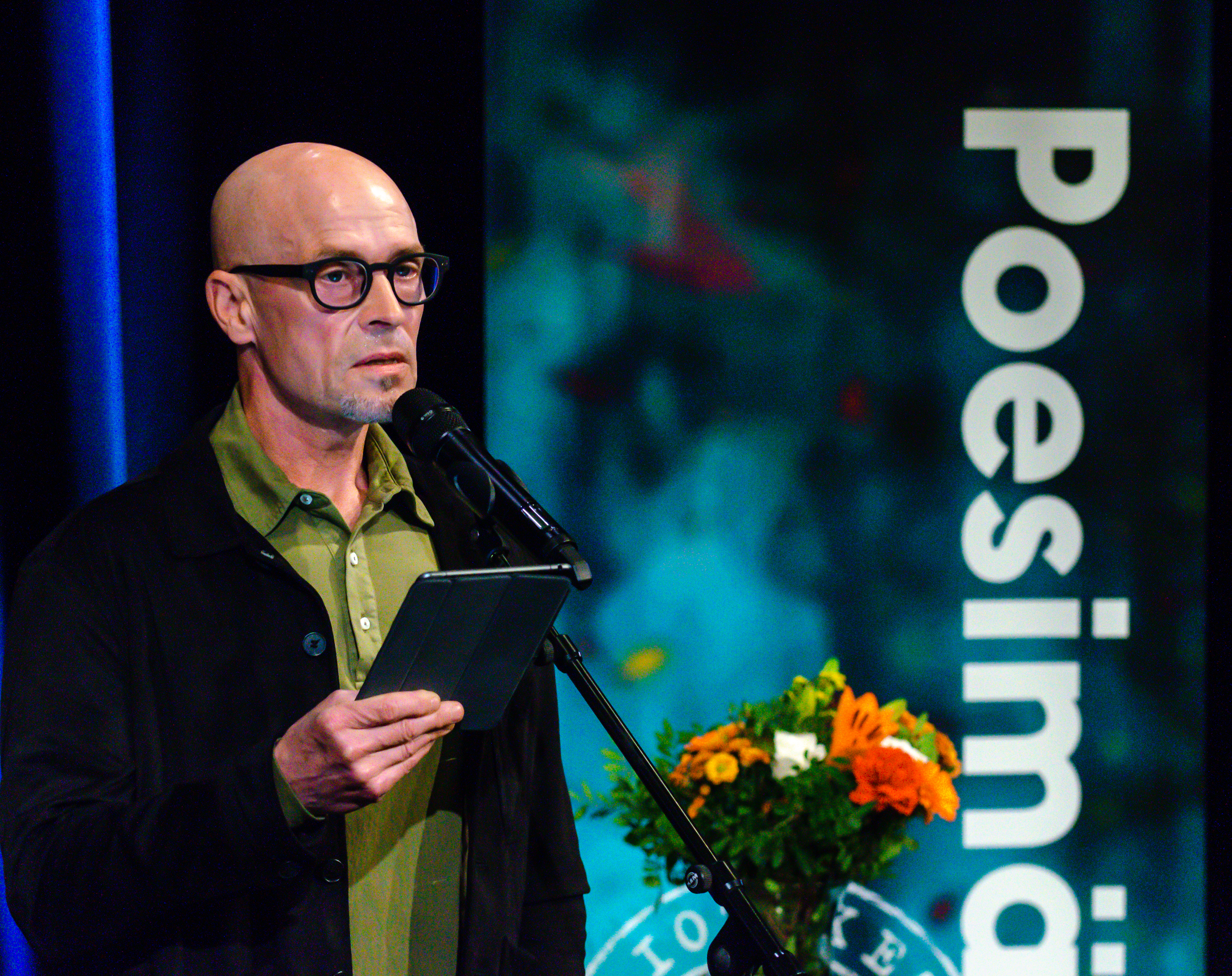
- Eriksson in 2023
- Born: Ulf Nils Erik Eriksson; 8 January 1958 (age 67); Högdalen, Stockholm, Sweden
- Occupation(s): Writer and literary critic
- Awards: Dobloug Prize (1998)

Ulf Nils Erik Eriksson (born 8 January 1958) is a Swedish writer and literary critic.

== Biography ==
He made his literary debut in 1982, with the poetry collection Varelser av gräs. Further books include the essay collection Rum för läsande from 1990, the poetry collection Rymdens vila (2002), the short story collection Beröring under oväder (2003), the novel Varelser av glas (2005), and the poetry collection Om dagars genomskinlighet (2006). He was awarded the Dobloug Prize in 1998, shared with Klas Östergren.
