= 2000 in Sweden =

- Decades: 1980s; 1990s; 2000s; 2010s; 2020s
- See also: Other events of 2000; Timeline of Swedish history

The following lists events that happened during 2000 in Sweden.

== Incumbents ==
- Monarch – Carl XVI Gustaf
- Prime Minister – Göran Persson

== Events ==
=== January ===
- 1 January – The Church of Sweden is separated from the Swedish State.

=== July ===
- 1 July – The Öresund Bridge, which links Malmö to Copenhagen, is inaugurated and opens to traffic.

== Popular culture ==
=== Film ===
- 13 May – Faithless, directed by Liv Ullmann, released.
- 4 August – Sleepwalker released
- 25 August – Together released in Sweden
- 22 December – Jalla! Jalla!, comedy film directed by Josef Fares

=== Literature ===
- The Return of the Dancing Master, crime novel by Henning Mankell
- Missing, crime fiction novel by Karin Alvtegen

=== Sports ===
- 10 December – The 2000 European Cross Country Championships were held in Malmö

== Births ==
=== March ===
- 7 March – Rasmus Sandin, ice hockey player

=== April ===
- 7 April – Julia Kedhammar, singer
- 13 April – Rasmus Dahlin, ice hockey player
- 20 April – Klara Hammarström, singer
- 20 April – Nils Fröling, footballer
- 25 April – Dejan Kulusevski, footballer

=== June ===
- 12 June – Nina Dano, handballer

=== July ===
- 23 July – Malte Gårdinger, actor

=== August ===
- 15 August – Adam Boqvist, ice hockey player

=== September ===
- 4 September – Peter Gwargis, footballer

=== October ===
- 23 October – Hanna Ferm, singer

=== December ===
- 20 December
  - Gaboro, rapper and songwriter (d. 2024)
  - Nils Höglander, ice hockey player

== Deaths ==
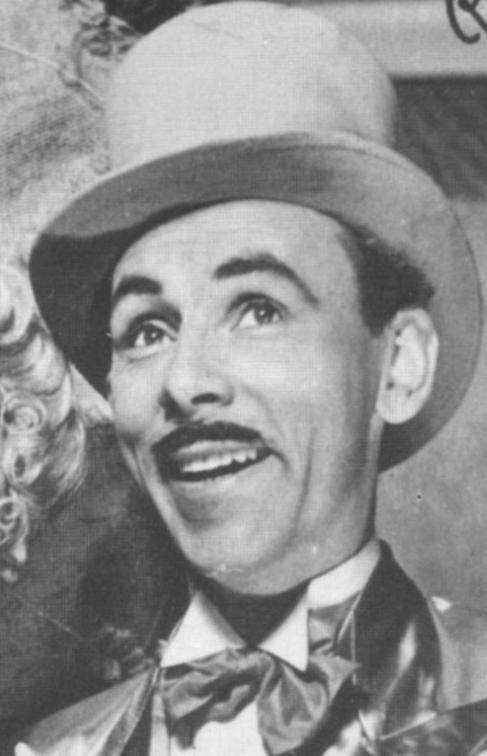
Nils Poppe.

- 8 January – Henry Eriksson, athlete (born 1920).
- 13 January – John Ljunggren, athlete (born 1919).
- 25 January – Folke Ekström, chess player (born 1906)
- 25 February – Doris Löve, botanist (born 1918)
- 19 March – Egon Jönsson, footballer (born 1921).
- 28 June – Nils Poppe, actor, director and screenwriter (born 1908)
- 29 July – Åke Hodell, fighter pilot and poet (born 1919)
- 30 July – Örjan Blomquist, cross-country skier (born 1957)
- 28 August – Knut Holmqvist, sport shooter (born 1918).
- 18 October – Inga Gill, film actress (born 1925)
