= Anne-Marie Berglund =

Swedish writer (1952–2020)

- Born: 31 January 1952; Espoo, Finland
- Died: 6 March 2020 (aged 68); Stockholm, Sweden
- Occupations: Poet, novelist, short story writer and pictorial artist
- Awards: Dobloug Prize (2002)

Anne-Marie Berglund (31 January 1952 – 6 March 2020) was a Swedish poet, novelist, short story writer and pictorial artist. She was born in Espoo and made her literary debut in 1977 with the poetry collection Luftberusningen. Among her later collections was Jag vill stå träd nu from 2000. Among her several literary prizes, she was awarded the Dobloug Prize in 2002.
