= Birger Norman =

Swedish writer (1914–1995)

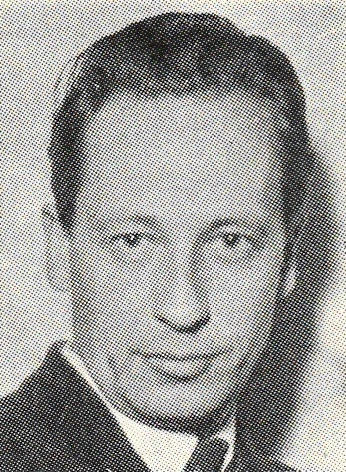
- Born: 30 July 1914; Svanö, Sweden
- Died: 13 September 1995 (aged 81); Stockholm, Sweden
- Occupations: Journalist, poet, novelist, playwright and non-fiction writer
- Awards: Litterturfrämjandets stora pris 1971; Dobloug Prize 1989; Illis quorum 1991

Birger Norman (30 July 1914 – 13 September 1995) was a Swedish journalist, poet, novelist, playwright and non-fiction writer.

== Biography ==
Birger Norman was born at Svanö in Kramfors, Sweden. He was raised in the historic province of Ångermanland. He first worked as a journalist and chronicler with the magazine Metallarbetaren. He made his literary debut in 1951, with the poetry collection Sånger vid floden. He received the Litterturfrämjandets stora pris in 1971 and the Dobloug Prize in 1989 as well as the Illis quorum in 1991. He died in Stockholm in 1995. The Birger Norman Society (Birger Normansällskapet) was formed in April 2004.
