= Björn-Erik Höijer =

Swedish writer (1907–1996)

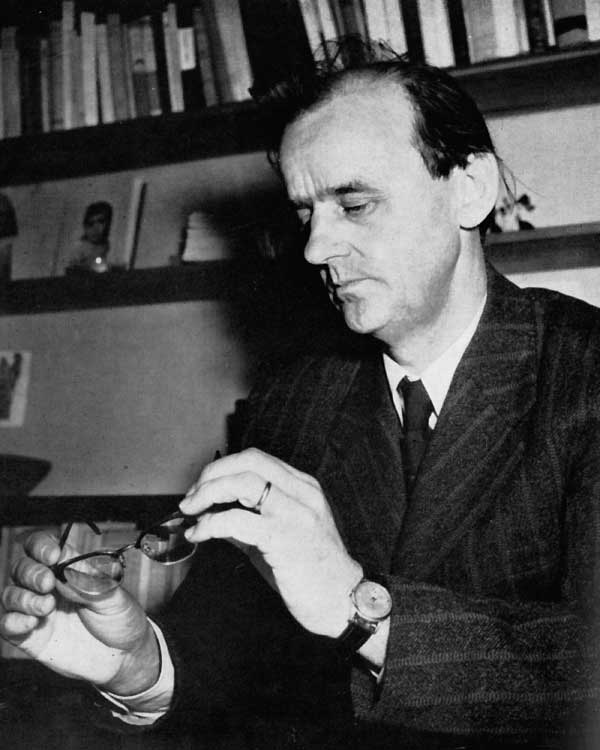
- Born: 14 March 1907; Malmberget, Sweden
- Died: 10 February 1996 (aged 88); Uppsala, Sweden
- Occupations: Novelist, short-story writer and playwright
- Awards: Dobloug Prize (1967)

Björn-Erik Höijer (14 March 1907 – 10 February 1996) was a Swedish novelist, short-story writer and playwright.

He was born at Malmberget, Sweden. Originally a handicraft teacher (sloyd), Höijer made his literary debut in 1940 with the short-story collection Grått berg. Among his novels are Parentation from 1945 and Lavinen from 1961. Among his plays are Isak Juntti hade många söner from 1954 and En gruvarbetares död from 1990. He was awarded the Dobloug Prize in 1967. He died during 1996 and was buried at Uppsala gamla kyrkogård.
