= 1998 in Sweden =

- Decades: 1970s; 1980s; 1990s; 2000s; 2010s
- See also: Other events of 1998; Timeline of Swedish history

Events from the year 1998 in Sweden

== Incumbents ==
- Monarch – Carl XVI Gustaf
- Prime Minister – Göran Persson

== Events ==
- 1 January – Västra Götaland County is founded following a merger of the counties of Älvsborg, Göteborg and Bohus, and Skaraborg Counties.

=== September ===
- 20 September – The 1998 Swedish general election.

== Popular culture ==
=== Literature ===
- Date unknown: Berömda män som varit i Sunne, novel by Göran Tunström, winner of the August Prize.

=== Music ===
- 21 October – Blott en dag, music album released by Carola Häggkvist

=== Sports ===
- 7–22 February: 99 sportspersons compete for Sweden at the 1998 Winter Olympics.
- 8 November: The 1998 Allsvenskan is won by AIK.

== Births ==
- 29 May – Matilda Algotsson, figure skater
- 15 October – Jonna Luthman, alpine ski racer.
- 30 October – Jesper Boqvist, Swedish ice hockey player
- 15 November – Emma Larsson, artistic gymnast

== Deaths ==
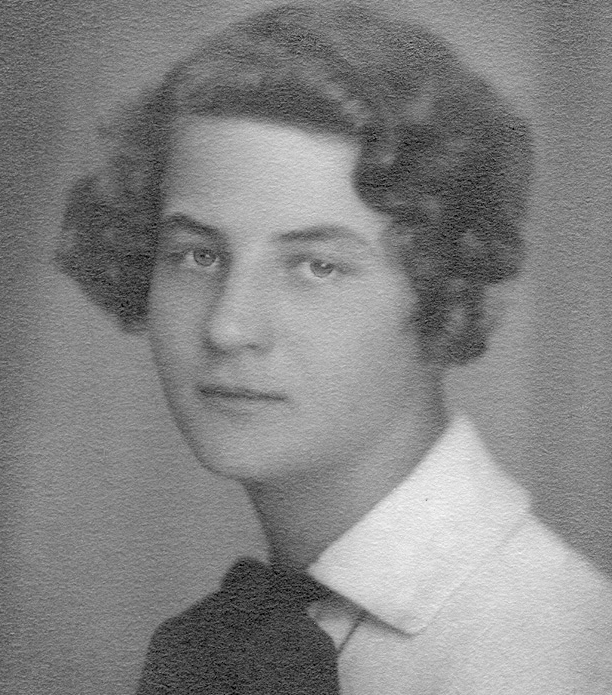
Märta Johansson

- 1 January – Åke Seyffarth, speed skater (born 1919).
- 6 January – Märta Johansson, diver (born 1907).
- 21 May – Erik Bladström, canoer, Olympic champion 1936 (born 1918).
- 1 December – Bertil Nordahl, footballer (born 1917).

=== Full date missing ===
- Birger Sandberg, footballer (born 1918)
