= Tobias Berggren =

Swedish poet (1940–2020)

- Born: 22 January 1940
- Died: 8 June 2020 (aged 80)
- Occupation: Poet
- Awards: Dobloug Prize (1992)

Tobias Berggren (22 January 1940 – 8 June 2020) was a Swedish poet. He made his literary debut in 1969. Among his later collections are Namn och grus from 1973 and Fält och legender from 1997. He was awarded the Dobloug Prize in 1992.
