= Per Erik Rundquist =

Swedish novelist and poet (1912–1986)

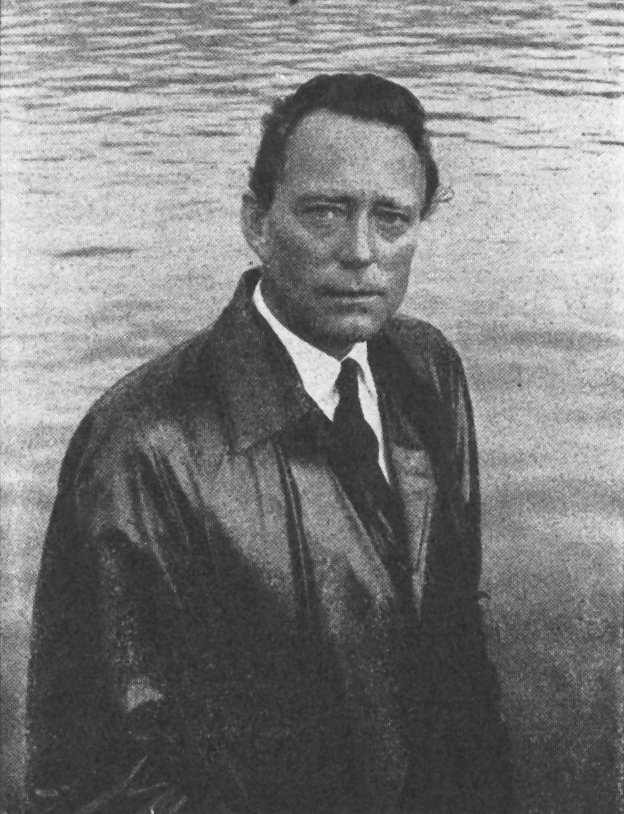
- Born: 22 April 1912; Stockholm
- Died: 12 December 1986 (aged 74)
- Occupations: Novelist, poet
- Writing career
- Language: Swedish
- Notable awards: Dobloug Prize; 1974

Per Erik Rundquist (1912–1986) was a Swedish novelist and poet. He made his literary debut in 1938, with the novel Sven-Patrik. Among his later novels are Kalla mig Ismael! from 1950, and Generalen from 1953. He was awarded the Dobloug Prize in 1974.
