= Tage Aurell =

Swedish journalist, novelist and translator

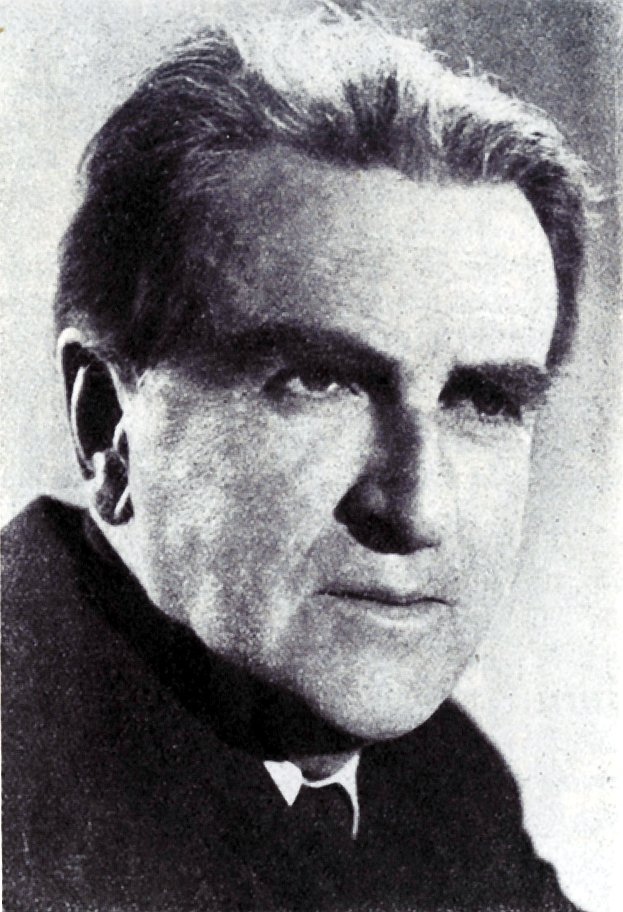
- Born: 2 March 1895; Oslo, Norway
- Died: 21 February 1976 (aged 80); Mangskog, Sweden
- Occupations: Journalist, novelist and translator
- Awards: Dobloug Prize (1966)

Tage Aurell (1895–1976) was a Swedish journalist, novelist and translator.

== Life and career ==
Aurell was born in Oslo, Norway on 2 March 1895 to Albert Aurell and Anna Lerstein.

He made his literary debut in 1932 with the novel Tybergs gård, while his literary breakthrough was Skillingtryck from 1943. He was awarded the Dobloug Prize in 1966.

Aurell died in Mangskog, Sweden, on 21 February 1976, at the age of 80.
