= Birgitta Lillpers =

Swedish poet and novelist

- Born: 14 February 1958 (age 68)
- Occupations: Novelist and poet
- Awards: Dobloug Prize (2001); Grand De Nio Prize (2008); Bellman Prize (2011)

Birgitta Lillpers (born 14 February 1958) is a Swedish poet and novelist. Among her poetry collections are Silverskåp from 2000 and Nu försvinner vi eller ingår from 2007. Among her novels are Blomvattnarna from 1987 and Medan de ännu hade hästar from 1993. She was awarded the Dobloug Prize in 2001 and the Grand De Nio Prize in 2008. She was awarded the Bellman Prize in 2011.

== Selected works ==
- Stämnoja, poetry collection, 1982
- Igenom: härute, poetry collection, 1984
- Gry, och bärga, poetry collection, 1986
- Blomvattnarna, novel, 1987
- I bett om vatten, poetry collection, 1988
- Besök på en främmande kennel, poetry collection, 1990
- Iris, Isis och skräddaren, novel, 1991
- Krigarna i den här provinsen, poetry collection, 1992
- Medan de ännu hade hästar, novel, 1993
- Propolis, poetry collection, 1995
- Och jag grep årorna och rodde, novel, 1998
- Silverskåp, poetry collection, 2000
- Alla dessa liv och våder, novel, 2002
- Glömde väl inte ljusets element när du räknade, poetry collection, 2004
- Dikter från betet, poetry collection, 2006
- Nu försvinner vi eller ingår, poetry collection, 2007
- Om du fick tänka dig ett hem, novel, 2010
- Industriminnen, 2012
- Anteckningar om hö, 2016
- En Häst Brun till färjen: om hästkulturen i Orsa från äldsta tid till 1950, 2018
- Kälda, 2020
