= Ernst Brunner (writer) =

Swedish writer and literary scholar

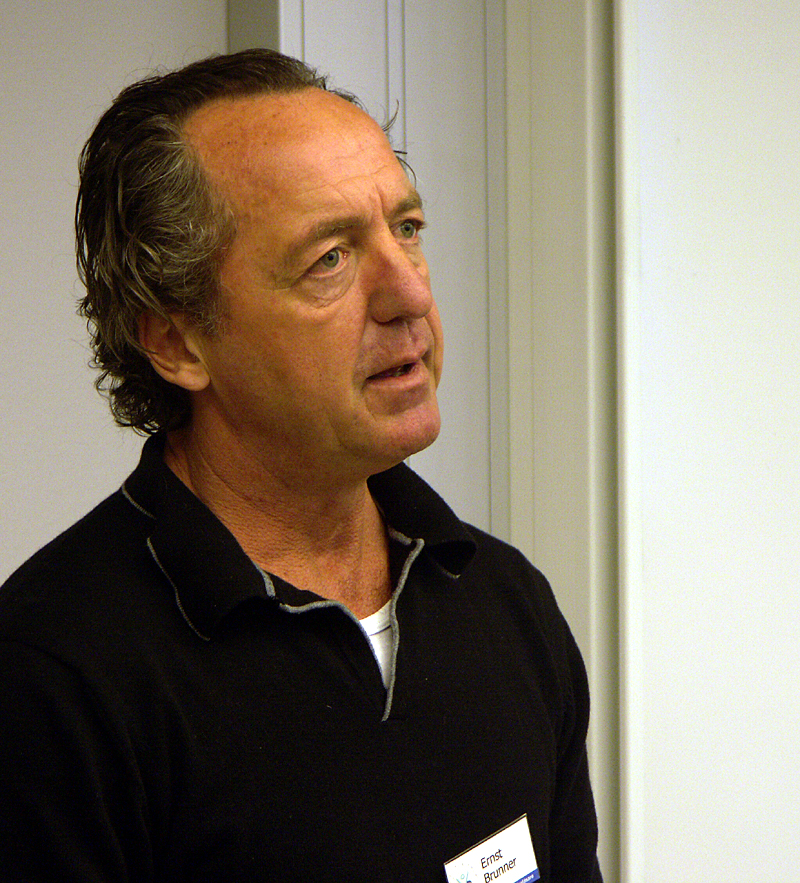
- Born: 5 September 1950 (age 75); Tullinge, Sweden
- Occupations: Writer and literary scholar
- Awards: Dobloug Prize (2019)

Ernst Brunner (born 5 September 1950) is a Swedish writer and literary scholar.

Brunner was born in Tullinge to alpine skiers Leo and Gertrud Brunner. His thesis from 1985 is a treatment of Edith Södergran. His early fictional works include the poetry collections Jag ändrar ställning klockan tre from 1979, Söderväggar from 1980, and I det stora och hela from 1982, and the novels Känneru brorsan? (1980), Dans på rovor (1983), and Svarta villan (1987). His novel Edith from 1992 is a fictional treatment of Edith Södergren, Fukta din aska (2002) is a biographical novel on Carl Michael Bellman, and Carolus Rex (2005) is a biographical novel on Charles XII of Sweden. In 2019 he published Likt ett skeleton, a historical biography of Johan Helmich Roman.

He was awarded the Dobloug Prize in 2019.
