= Ole Robert Sunde =

Norwegian poet, novelist and essayist

- Born: 11 November 1952 (age 73)
- Occupations: Poet; Novelist; Essayist
- Awards: Aschehoug Prize (2001); Gyldendal Prize (2007); Dobloug Prize (2015)

Ole Robert Sunde (born 11 November 1952 in Kristiansand) is a Norwegian poet, novelist and essayist. He made his literary debut in 1982 with the poetry collection Hakk i hæl. He was awarded the Aschehoug Prize in 2001, and the Gyldendal Prize in 2007.

== Bibliography ==
- Hakk i hæl – poem (1982)
- Fra dette punktet trekker jeg en omkrets – poem (1983)
- Den lange teksten historie – novel (1984)
- Kontrapunktisk – novel (1987)
- 4. person entall – essays (1990)
- Naturligvis måtte hun ringe – novel (1992)
- En ordinær høyde – novel (1994)
- Støvets applaus – essays (1995)
- All verdens småting – texts (1996)
- Den sovende stemmen – novel (1999)
- Der hvor vi er lykkelige – Essays (2000)
- Løsøre – texts (2003)
- Jeg er som en åpen bok – novel (2005)
- Kalypso (2006)
- Jeg er et vilt begrep (2007)
- Selvomsorg (2010)
- Krigen var min families historie (2012) - nominert til Nordisk råds litteraturpris
- Hvorfor er vannet vått, children's book, Gyldendal (2013)
- Verden uten ende, essays (2014)
- Tenk fort, novel, Gyldendal (2016)
- Penelope er syk, novel, Gyldendal (2017)
- Jeg føler meg uvel, novel, Gyldendal (2019)
