= 1997 in Sweden =

- Decades: 1970s; 1980s; 1990s; 2000s; 2010s
- See also: Other events of 1997; Timeline of Swedish history

Events from the year 1997 in Sweden

== Incumbents ==
- Monarch – Carl XVI Gustaf
- Prime Minister – Göran Persson

== Events ==
- 1 January
  - Skåne County is founded following a merger of the counties of Kristianstad and Malmöhus.
  - Kopparberg County is renamed Dalarna County.
- 13 September-13 December – Planet 24 premiered the first season of a critically acclaimed reality game show franchise, Expedition Robinson, formally known as Survivor. The first series to use the formalized name would not occur until its debut on 31 May 2000. Coincidentally, both seasons were shot in islands of Malaysia. The first season was won by police officer Martin Melin.
- Date unknown: The inaugural International Science Festival in Gothenburg is held.

== Popular culture ==
=== Literature ===
- Date unknown: April Witch, novel by Majgull Axelsson, winner of the August Prize.

=== Sports ===
- 1 January: The 1997 Allsvenskan was won by Halmstads BK
- 9 February: Sweden win the 1997 Bandy World Championship as hosts
- 10 April: The 1997 Le Mat Trophy is won by Färjestad BK
- 30 November: Sweden win the 1997 Davis Cup at home

== Births ==
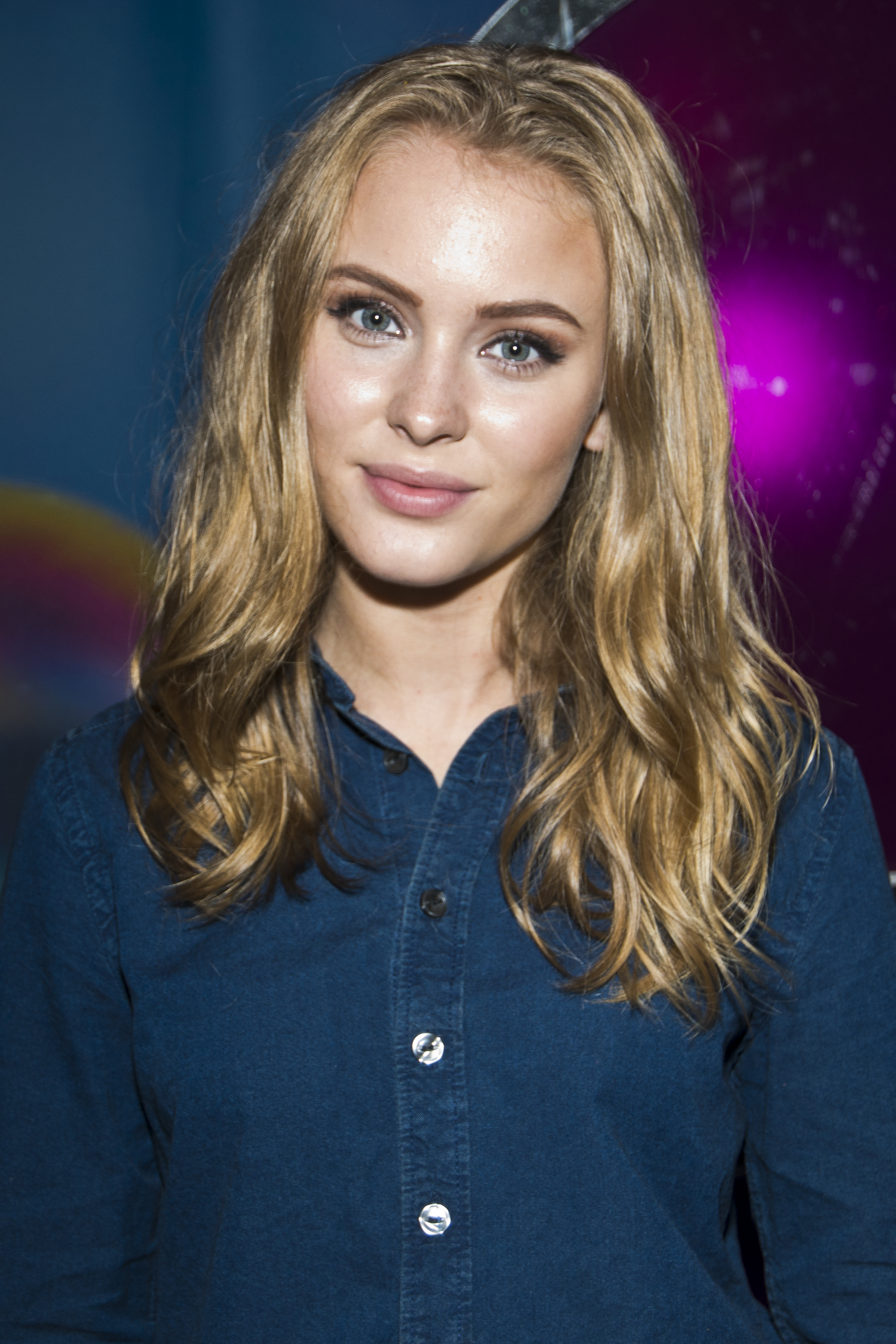
Zara Larsson.

- 1 February – Filip Dagerstål, footballer
- 12 February – Johanna Rytting Kaneryd, footballer
- 8 March – Irene Ekelund, sprinter
- 28 March – Sebastian Samuelsson, biathlete
- 4 May – Nathalie Björn, footballer
- 10 May – Anna Anvegård, association football player
- 19 May – Oliver Kylington, ice hockey player
- 23 May – Gustaf Nilsson, Swedish footballer
- 20 June – Jordan Larsson, footballer
- 10 July – Ebba Andersson, cross-country skier
- 14 September – Benjamin Ingrosso, singer and songwriter
- 26 November – Jennie Wåhlin, curler
- 29 November – Emma Ribom, cross-country skier
- 16 December – Zara Larsson, singer

== Deaths ==
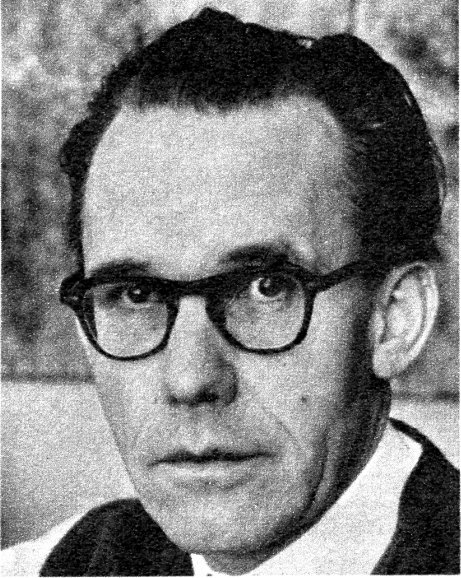
Sivar Arnér.

- 13 January – Sivar Arnér, novelist and playwright (born 1909).
- 25 January – Werner Aspenström, poet (b. 1918)
- 7 February – Allan Edwall, actor, director, author, composer and singer (b. 1924)
- 11 March – Lars Ahlin, writer and aesthetician (b. 1915)
- 11 March – Stefan Fernholm, discus thrower and shot putter (b. 1959)
- 12 April – Ivar Eriksson, footballer (b. 1909)
- 1 May – Bo Widerberg, film director, writer, editor and actor (b. 1930)
- 22 June – Ted Gärdestad, singer-songwriter (b. 1956)
- 4 July – Bengt Danielsson, anthropologist (b. 1921)
- 3 October – Jarl Kulle, film and stage actor and director (b. 1927)
- 14 December – Torsten Nilsson, politician (b. 1905)
