= Sandro Key-Åberg =

Swedish poet and novelist

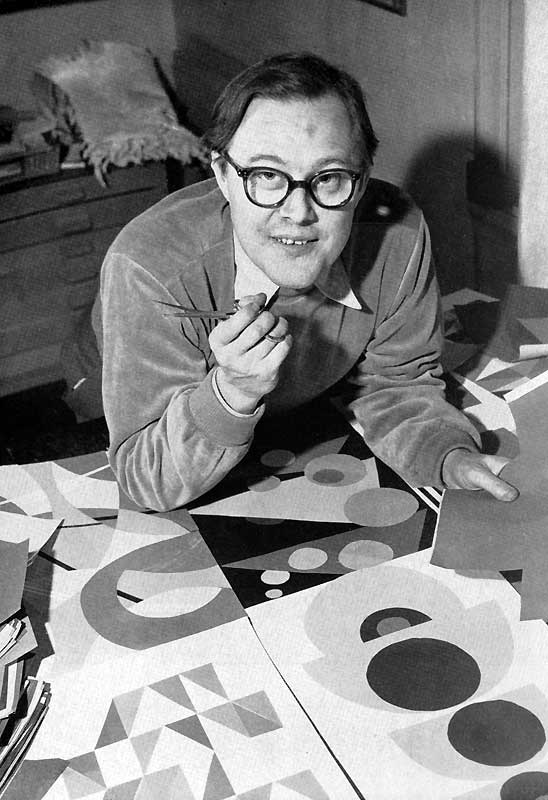
- Born: 1922
- Died: 1991 (aged 68–69)
- Occupations: Poet and novelist
- Awards: Dobloug Prize (1983)

Sandro Key-Åberg (1922–1991) was a Swedish poet and novelist. He made his literary debut in 1950 with the poetry collection Skrämdas lekar. Other collections were Livets glädje from 1960, O from 1965, and I det darrande ljuset from 1981. His first novel was De goda människorna from 1975. He was awarded the Dobloug Prize in 1983 and the Illis quorum in 1987.
