= Erik Beckman =

Swedish poet, novelist and playwright

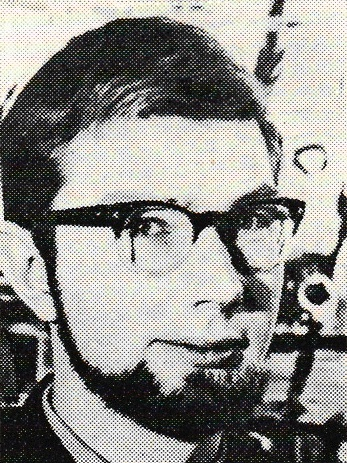
- Born: 1935
- Died: 1995 (aged 59–60)
- Occupations: Poet, novelist and playwright
- Awards: Dobloug Prize (1972)

Erik Beckman (23 April 1935 – 8 June 1995) was a Swedish poet, novelist and playwright. Among his poetry collections are Varifrån dom observeras from 1966, Kyss Er! from 1969, and Kärleksgubbar! Herdedikter from 1981. He was awarded the Dobloug Prize in 1972.
