= Anna Westberg =

Swedish writer

- Born: 14 September 1946; Ovansjö socken, Gästrikland, Sweden
- Died: 26 October 2005 (aged 59)
- Occupations: Novelist and non-fiction writer
- Awards: Dobloug Prize (1992)

Anna Westberg (14 September 1946 – 26 October 2005) was a Swedish journalist, novelist and non-fiction writer. She grew up in Ovansjö socken in Gästrikland. She made her literary debut in 1978 with the novel Paradisets döttrar. Her major literary breakthrough was in 1980 with the novel Walters hus, which earned her the Svenka Dagbladets Litteraturpris. She co-edited the two-volume Kvinnornas litteraturhistoria from 1981/1983. She was awarded the Dobloug Prize in 1992.
