= Oliver Källbom =

Swedish ice hockey player

- Born: May 9, 1995 (age 30) Sweden
- Height: 6 ft 1 in (185 cm)
- Weight: 172 lb (78 kg; 12 st 4 lb)
- Position: Goaltender
- Catches: Left
- SHL team: Linköpings HC
- NHL draft: Undrafted
- Playing career: 2013–present

Oliver Källbom (born May 9, 1995) is a Swedish ice hockey goaltender. He is currently playing with Linköpings HC of the Swedish Hockey League (SHL).

Källbom made his debut with Linköpings HC during the 2013 European Trophy.
