= 1999 in Sweden =

- Decades: 1970s; 1980s; 1990s; 2000s; 2010s
- See also: Other events of 1999; Timeline of Swedish history

Events from the year 1999 in Sweden

== Incumbents ==
- Monarch – Carl XVI Gustaf
- Prime Minister – Göran Persson

== Events ==
=== May ===
- 28 May – The Malexander murders.
- 29 May – Charlotte Nilsson wins Eurovision Song Contest.

=== September ===
- 1 September – Sunderby Hospital is inaugurated, the result of a contested merger between regional hospitals in Luleå and Boden.

=== December ===
- 3 December – Cyclone Carola strikes southern Sweden, causing widespread power outages and extensive damage to forests.

== Popular culture ==
=== Sports ===
- The 1999 Allsvenskan was won by Helsingborgs IF

=== Film ===
- 1 October – Tsatsiki, morsan och polisen, directed by Ella Lemhagen, released

== Births ==
- 21 January – Pontus Dahlberg, footballer

== Deaths ==
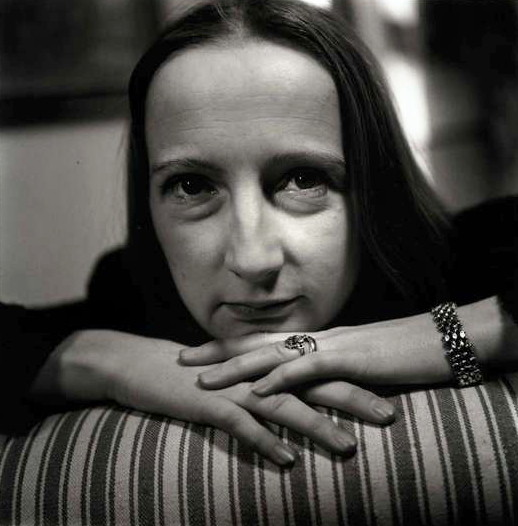
Birgit Cullberg in 1943

- 15 January – Lars Glassér, sprint canoer, world champion (born 1925).
- 29 April – Oscar Ljung, film actor (born 1909)
- 28 May – Henry Carlsson, footballer (born 1917).
- 13 June – Kjell Rosén, footballer (born 1921)
- 8 September – Birgit Cullberg, choreographer (born 1908)
- 12 November – Sven Hjertsson, footballer (born 1924).

== See also ==
- 1999 in Swedish television
