= Connect/Disconnect =

Musical by Ola Hörling and Jan-Erik Sääf

Connect/Disconnect (Swedish title Kontaktannonsen) is a one-act musical written by Ola Hörling (book and lyrics) and Jan-Erik Sääf (music and lyrics), which received its premiere in 1996 at Artisten in Gothenburg, Sweden. Since then it has toured in Sweden, Denmark and Finland and has been translated and adapted and a second act added by Sääf and Owen Robertson, in which form it has played in London and at the June Havoc Theatre in New York City in July 2009 as part of the Midtown International Theatre Festival, directed by Rick Jacobs and produced by Jacobs and Robert Greer.

== Cast ==
- Derek Keeling
- Heather Laws
