= Svensk Kassaservice =

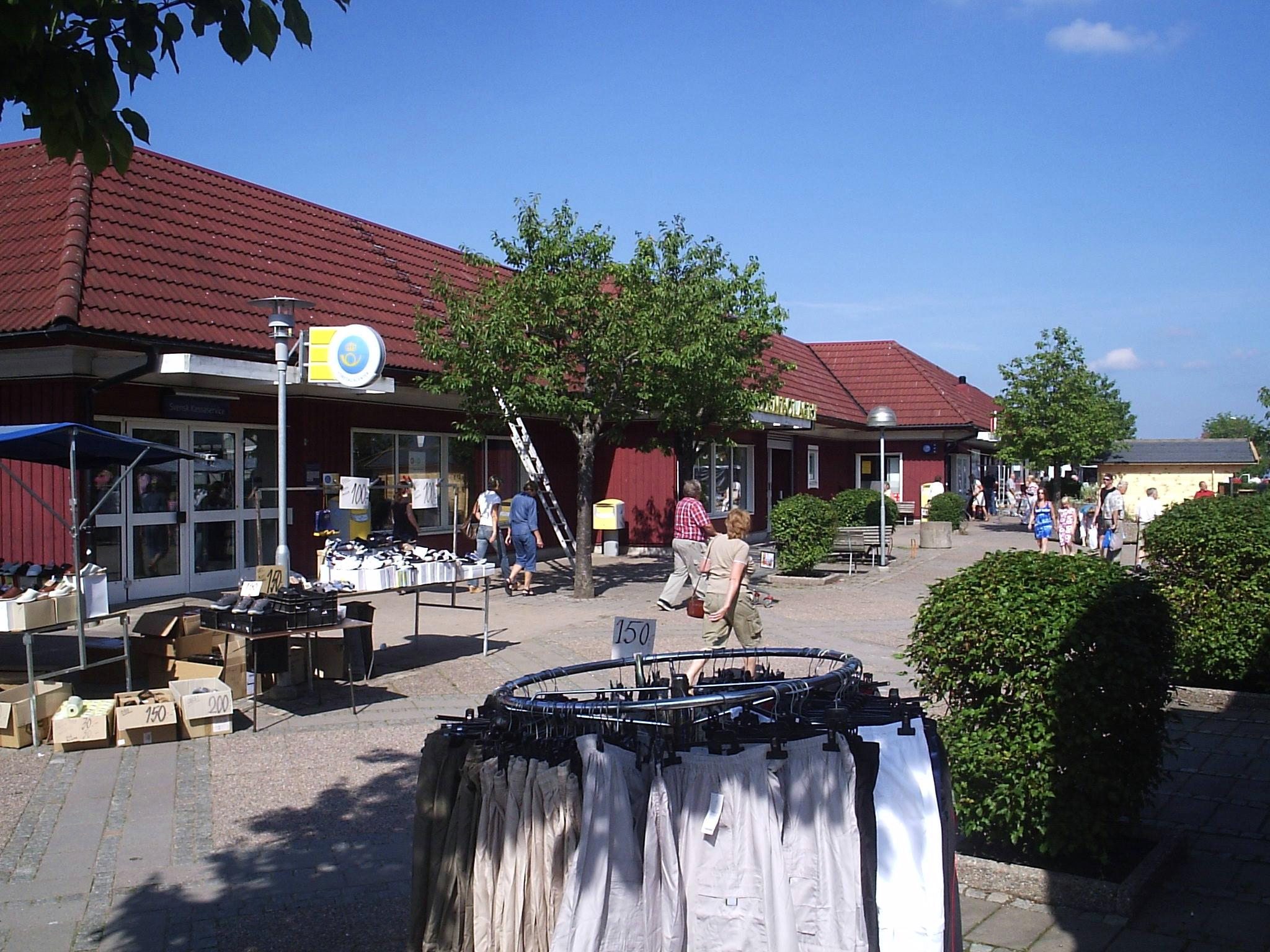

Svensk Kassaservice (Swedish Cashier Service) is a former subsidiary of Posten AB - the Swedish postal service. Svensk Kassaservice provided a retail cashier service of processing simple transactions such as paying bills, withdrawing and depositing money from/to bank accounts of several Swedish banks. Among other services that was provided were the ordering of Swedish identity cards.

Svensk Kassaservice was split off from Posten in 2001.

Svensk Kassaservice was closed down on 31 December 2008 and all its offices was closed by then.
