= Per Odensten =

Swedish novelist and poet (1938–2023)

- Born: 4 October 1938; Karlskrona, Sweden
- Died: 10 July 2023 (aged 84)
- Occupations: Novelist and poet
- Awards: Dobloug Prize (2000)

Per Odensten (4 October 1938 – 10 July 2023) was a Swedish novelist and poet. He made his literary debut in 1981 with the novel Gheel. Among his other novels are Vänterskans flykt from 2004, and Horntrollet from 2007. He was awarded the Dobloug Prize in 2000.

Odensten died on 10 July 2023, at the age of 84.

== Bibliography ==
- Gheel: de galnas stad : roman (in Swedish). Norstedt. 1981. ISBN 978-91-1-801692-9.
- Václav Havel och tystnaden (in Swedish). P.A. Norstedt. 1983. ISBN 978-91-1-831472-8.
- Vänterskans flykt (in Swedish). Norstedts. 2004. ISBN 978-91-1-301289-6.
- Nio sätt att beskriva regnet (in Swedish). Norstedts. 3 February 2011. ISBN 978-91-1-303607-6.
- Andningskonstnären (in Swedish). Norstedts. 26 September 2013. ISBN 978-91-1-305434-6.
- Människoätarens skugga (in Swedish). Norstedts. 26 March 2015. ISBN 978-91-1-306627-1.
