= Gunnar Sandgren =

Swedish journalist, novelist and playwright

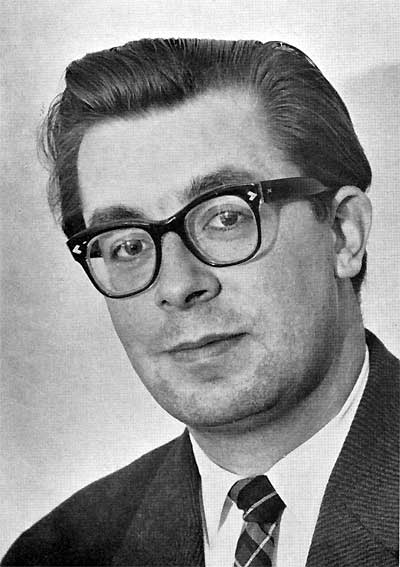
- Born: 27 June 1929 (age 96)
- Died: 4 June 2016 (aged 86)
- Occupations: Novelist and playwright
- Awards: Dobloug Prize (1981)

Gunnar Sandgren (27 June 1929 – 4 November 2016) was a Swedish journalist, novelist and playwright.

== Biography ==
Gunnar Ernst Algot Sandgren was born in Ölmstad parish in Jönköping County, Sweden. He was the son of Ernst Sandgren and Signhild Nilsson. He first worked as a journalist at Svenska Dagbladet from 1952. He made his literary debut in 1960, with the novel Förklaringsberget. He later wrote a series of historical novels. Bonniers published his books for the next 30 years.

During the 1970s, Sandgren worked for Sveriges Television where he and wrote a number of plays. He later he turned to classical theater where several of his plays attracted attention. He was awarded the Dobloug Prize in 1981.
