= Lars Andersson (writer) =

Swedish writer

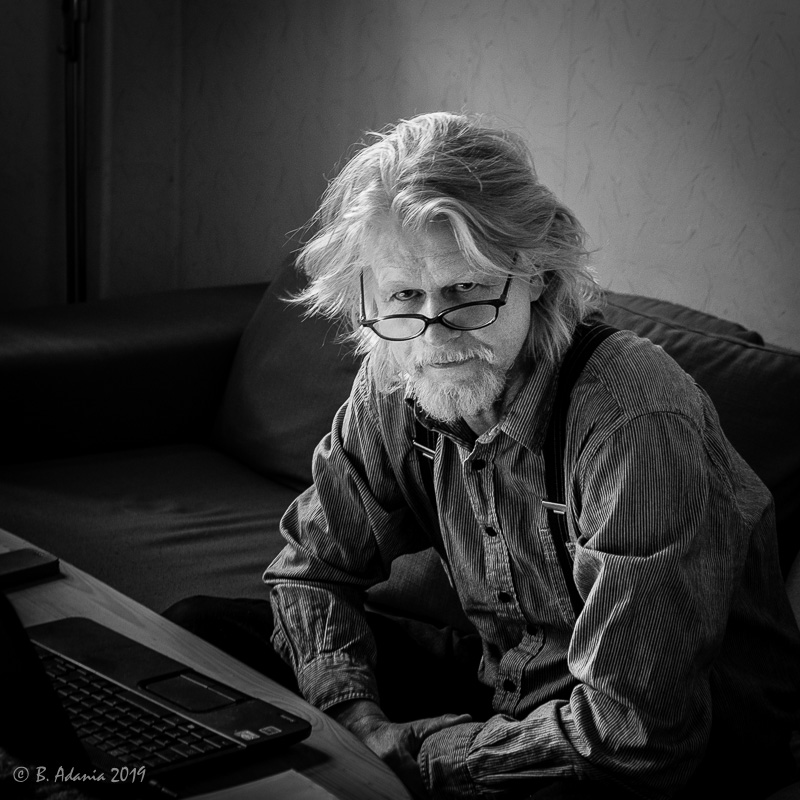
- Born: 23 March 1954 (age 72)
- Occupation: Writer
- Awards: Samfundet De Nio Grand Prize (1996); Dobloug Prize (2020)

Lars Andersson (born 23 March 1954) is a Swedish writer.

== Career ==
Andersson's literary debut was in 1974 with the novel Brandlyra. His next novel was Vi lever våra spel (1976), followed by the short story collection Gleipner in 1977. His 1979 novel, Snöljus, has been called a literary breakthrough. His essay collections include Försöksgrupp from 1980, Skuggbilderna (1995), and Fylgja – Resor och essäer (2004). In 1985, he published the poetry collection Lommen lyfter, and a later poetry collection is Motgift from 2001.

He has been a literary critic for the newspapers Dagens Nyheter, Aftonbladet, and Expressen.

== Awards ==
He was awarded the Dobloug Prize in 2020.
