= Rita Tornborg =

Swedish novelist and short story writer (born 1926)

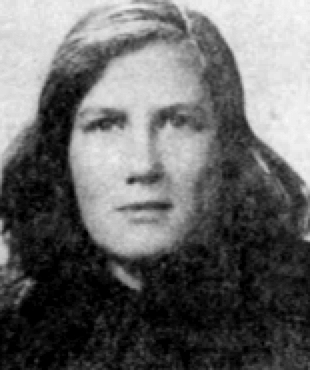
- Rita Tornborg 1944.jpg
- Born: 13 December 1926 (age 99); Johannesburg, South Africa
- Occupations: Novelist and short story writer
- Awards: Dobloug Prize (1995)

Rita Tornborg (born 13 December 1926) is a Swedish novelist and short story writer. She was born in South Africa, and grew up in Poland. She made her literary debut in 1970, with the novel Paukes gerilla. Other books are Salomos namnsdag from 1979, Systrarna from 1982, and the short story collection Rosalie from 1991. She was awarded the Dobloug Prize in 1995.
