= Agneta Pleijel =

Swedish writer

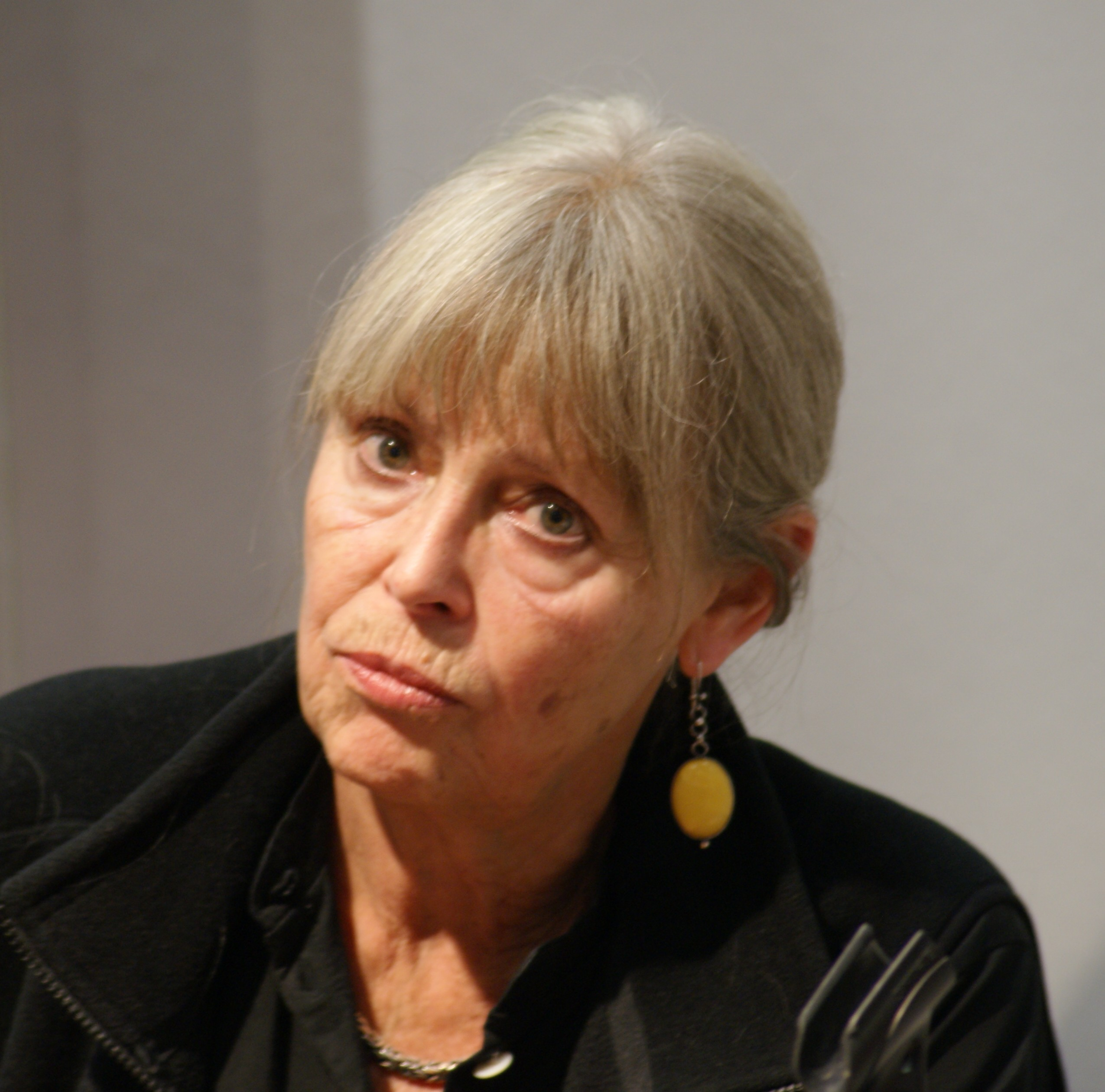
- Born: 1940 (age 85–86); Stockholm, Sweden
- Occupations: Poet, playwright, journalist and literary critic
- Awards: Dobloug Prize (1991); Swedish Academy Nordic Prize (2018)

Agneta Pleijel (born 1940, in Stockholm) is a Swedish novelist, poet, playwright, journalist and literary critic. Among her plays are Ordning härskar i Berlin from 1979. Among her novels are Vindspejare from 1987 and Drottningens chirurg from 2006. She has been a professor at Dramatiska Institutet since 1992. She was awarded the Dobloug Prize in 1991 and the Swedish Academy Nordic Prize in 2018.

== See also ==
- Swedish literature
- Swedish poetry
- Swedish Academy
- Dobloug Prize
- Swedish Academy Nordic Prize
- Dramatiska Institutet
