= Lars Jakobson =

Swedish writer

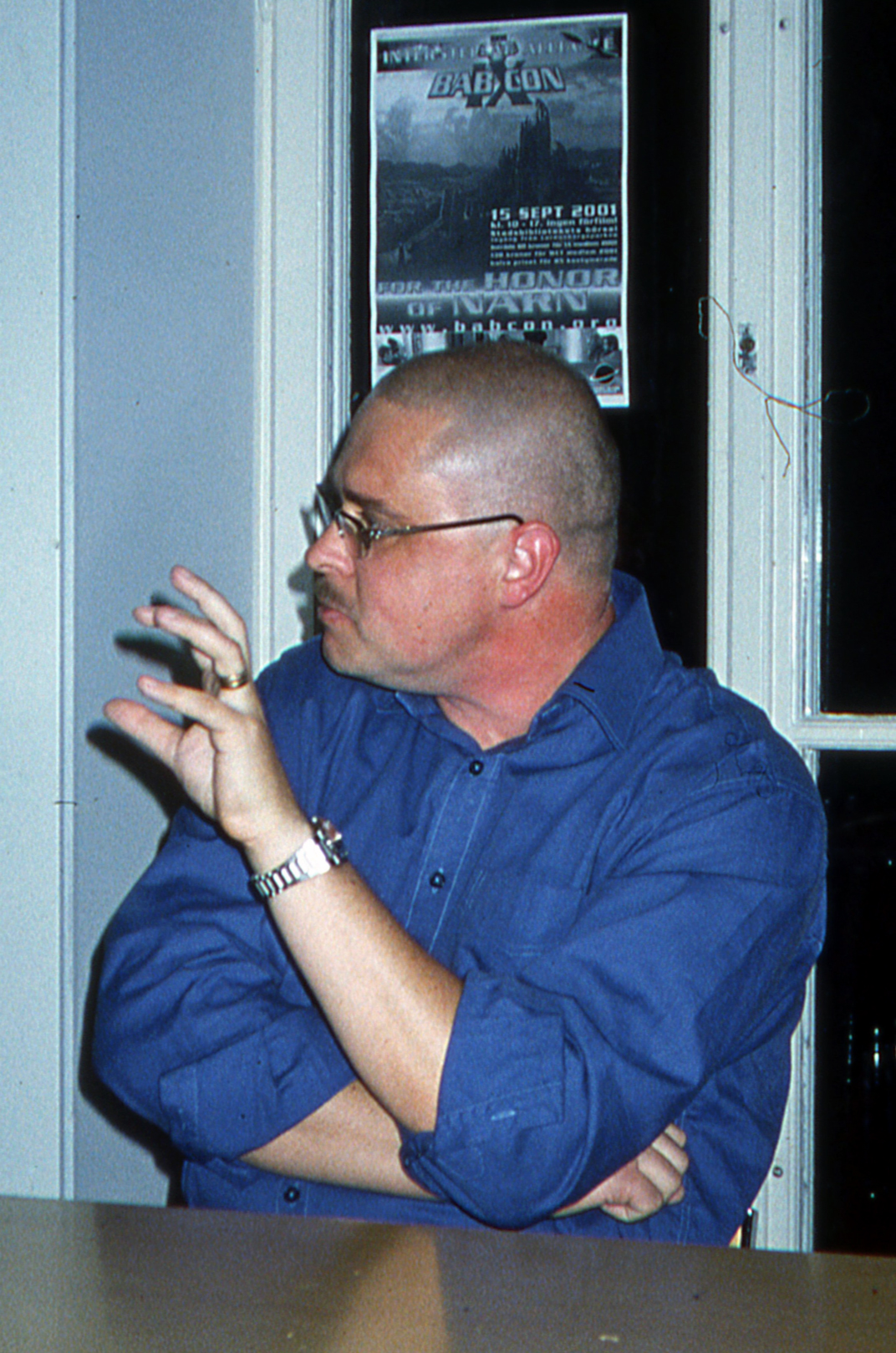
Lars Jakobson as Guest of Honour at a Swedish science fiction convention in Gothenburg, 2001.

Lars Jakobson (1959, Lund) is a Swedish author. Among the awards he won are the Svenska Dagbladet book prize and the Selma Lagerlöf Prize, both in 2006. For many years he lived in Stockholm.

== Bibliography ==
- Vinterkvarteret (novel, 1985)
- Vetten (novel, 1986)
- Menageri (short stories, 1989)
- Pumpan (novel, 1991)
- Hemsökelser (short stories, 1994)
- Kanalbyggarnas barn (novel, 1997)
- I den Röda damens slott. En martiansk biografi (novel, 2000)
- Stjärnfall. Om sf (essays, 2003) (Co-written with Ola Larsmo and Steve Sem-Sandberg)
- Berättelser om djur och andra (short stories, 2004)
- Vid den stora floden (novel, 2006)
- Vännerna (novel, 2010)
- Effekter (essays and short stories, 2011)
