= Tore Zetterholm =

Swedish novelist, playwright and journalist (1915–2001)

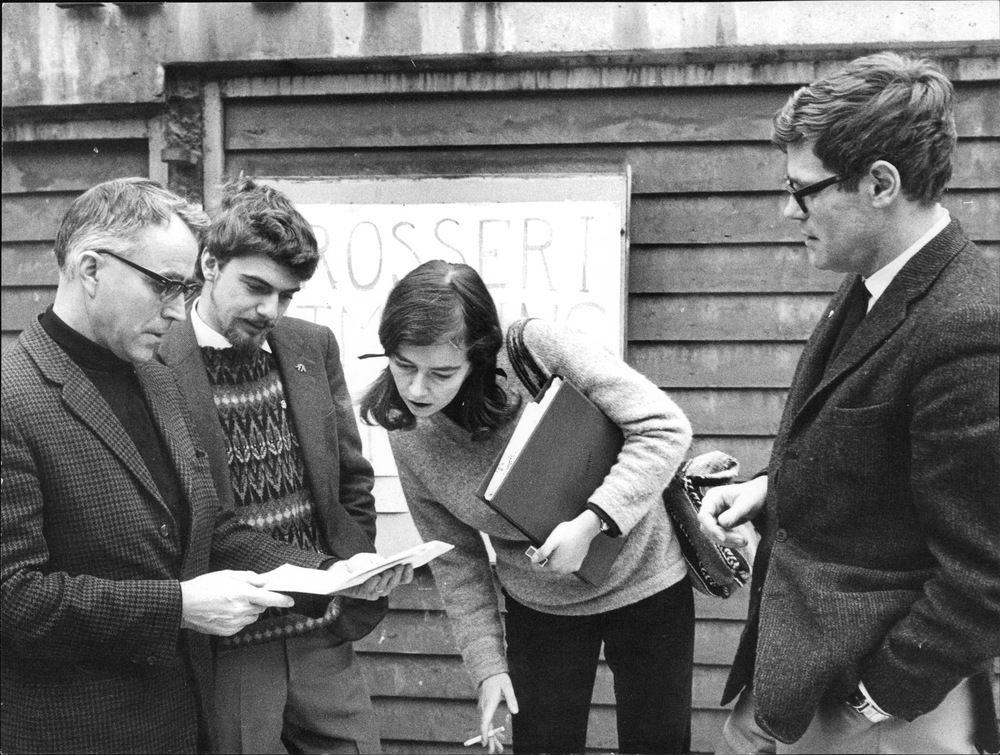
- Zetterholm (left), with Jan Fjellander, Kristina Ahlmark-Michanek and Göran Palm
- Born: 4 October 1915; Stockholm, Sweden
- Died: 9 November 2001 (aged 86); Höganäs, Sweden
- Occupation(s): novelist, playwright and journalist
- Awards: Dobloug Prize (1978)

Tore Ulf Axel Zetterholm (4 October 1915 – 9 November 2001) was a Swedish novelist, translator, playwright and journalist.

== Life and career ==
Zetterholm was born on 4 October 1915, a son of engineer Axel Emanuel Zetterholm and Agda Elisabeth Blomquist.

He made his literary debut in 1940 with the novel Stora Hoparegränd och himmelriket. He made the first Swedish translation of J. R. R. Tolkien's The Hobbit in 1947. He chaired the Writers' Guild of Sweden from 1957 to 1972. He was awarded the Dobloug Prize in 1978.

Zetterholm died on 9 November 2001, at the age of 86.
