= List of Swedish poets =

This is a list of Swedish poets, including those who are Swedish by nationality or who write in the Swedish language (years link to the corresponding "[year] in poetry" article):

== A ==
- Arvid August Afzelius (1785–1871), pastor, poet, historian and mythologist
- Sofia Ahlbom
- Catharina Ahlgren (1734 – c. 1800), feminist writer, poet, translator, editor, and one of the first identifiable female journalists in Sweden
- Per Ahlmark (1939–2018), writer and former leader of the Liberal People's Party
- Kurt Almqvist (1912–2001), poet, academic and spiritual figure
- August Bernhard Andersson (1877–1961)
- Dan Andersson (1888–1920)
- Werner Aspenström (1918–1997)
- Sun Axelsson (1935–2011), poet, novelist, translator and journalist

Back to top

== B ==
- Albert Ulrik Bååth (1853–1912)
- Frans G. Bengtsson (1894–1954)
- Bengt Berg (1885–1967)
- Bo Bergman (1869–1967)
- Marcus Birro (born 1972)
- Erik Blomberg (1894–1965)
- Carl Boberg (1859–1940)
- Karin Boye (1900–1941)
- Sophia Elisabet Brenner (1659–1730)

Back to top

== C ==
- Siv Cedering (1939–2007)
- Christina Charlotta Cederström
- Samuel Columbus (1642–1679)
- Gustaf Filip Creutz (1731–1785)

Back to top

== D ==
- Gunno Eurelius Dahlstierna (1661–1709)
- Olof von Dalin (1708–1763)
- Ebba Maria De la Gardie (1657–1697)

Back to top

== E ==
- Johannes Edfelt (1904–1997)
- Vilhelm Ekelund (1880–1949)
- Gunnar Ekelöf (1907–1968)

Back to top

== F ==
- Öyvind Fahlström
- Nils Ferlin (1898–1961)
- Lars Forssell (1928–2007)
- Jacob Frese (1691–1729)
- Katarina Frostenson (born 1953)
- Gustaf Fröding (1860–1911)

Back to top

== G ==
- Karl Johan Gabrielsson
- Erik Gustaf Geijer
- Kay Glans (born 1955)
- Lars Gustafsson

Back to top

== H ==
- Britt G. Hallqvist (1914–1997)
- Gunnar D. Hansson
- Verner von Heidenstam (1859–1940)
- Gunnar Henningsson (1895–1960)
- Urban Hjärne (1641–1724)
- Rose-Marie Huuva (born 1943)

Back to top

== J ==
- Ann Jäderlund (1955–1955)
- Lars Johansson (1638–1674)
- Majken Johansson
- Gabriel Jönsson

Back to top

== K ==
- Erik Axel Karlfeldt (1864–1931)
- Greta Knutson

Back to top

== L ==
- Olof Lagercrantz
- Pär Lagerkvist (1891–1974)
- Stig Larsson
- Oscar Levertin (1862–1906)
- Sven Lidman
- Erik Lindegren
- Ebba Lindqvist
- Kristina Lugn
- Artur Lundkvist (1906–1991)

Back to top

== M ==
- Bertil Malmberg (1889–1958)
- Tom Malmquist
- Harry Martinson (1904–1978)

Back to top

== N ==
- Ture Nerman
- Lars Norén

Back to top

== O ==
- Charlotta Öberg (1818–1856)
- Bruno K. Öijer (born 1951)
- Mohamed Omar (born 1976)
- Vladimir Oravsky (born 1947)
- Mathilda Valeria Beatrix d'Orozco

Back to top

== R ==
- Johan Runius (1679–1713)

Back to top

== S ==
- Östen Sjöstrand (1925–2006), poet, writer and translator
- Georg Stiernhielm (1598–1672)
- Eva Ström (born 1947)
- Jesper Svenbro (born 1944), poet and classical philologist
- Hjalmar Söderberg (1869–1941)

Back to top

== T ==
- Tomas Tranströmer (1931–2015), writer, poet and translator
- Samuel von Triewald (1688–1743)

Back to top

== V ==
- Karl Vennberg

Back to top

== W ==
- Gunnar Wennerberg
- Jacques Werup
- Lars Wivallius (1605–1669)
- Beppe Wolgers

== See also ==
- List of poets
- List of Swedish writers
- Lists of Swedes
- Swedish literature
