= Bellman Prize =

Swedish literary award

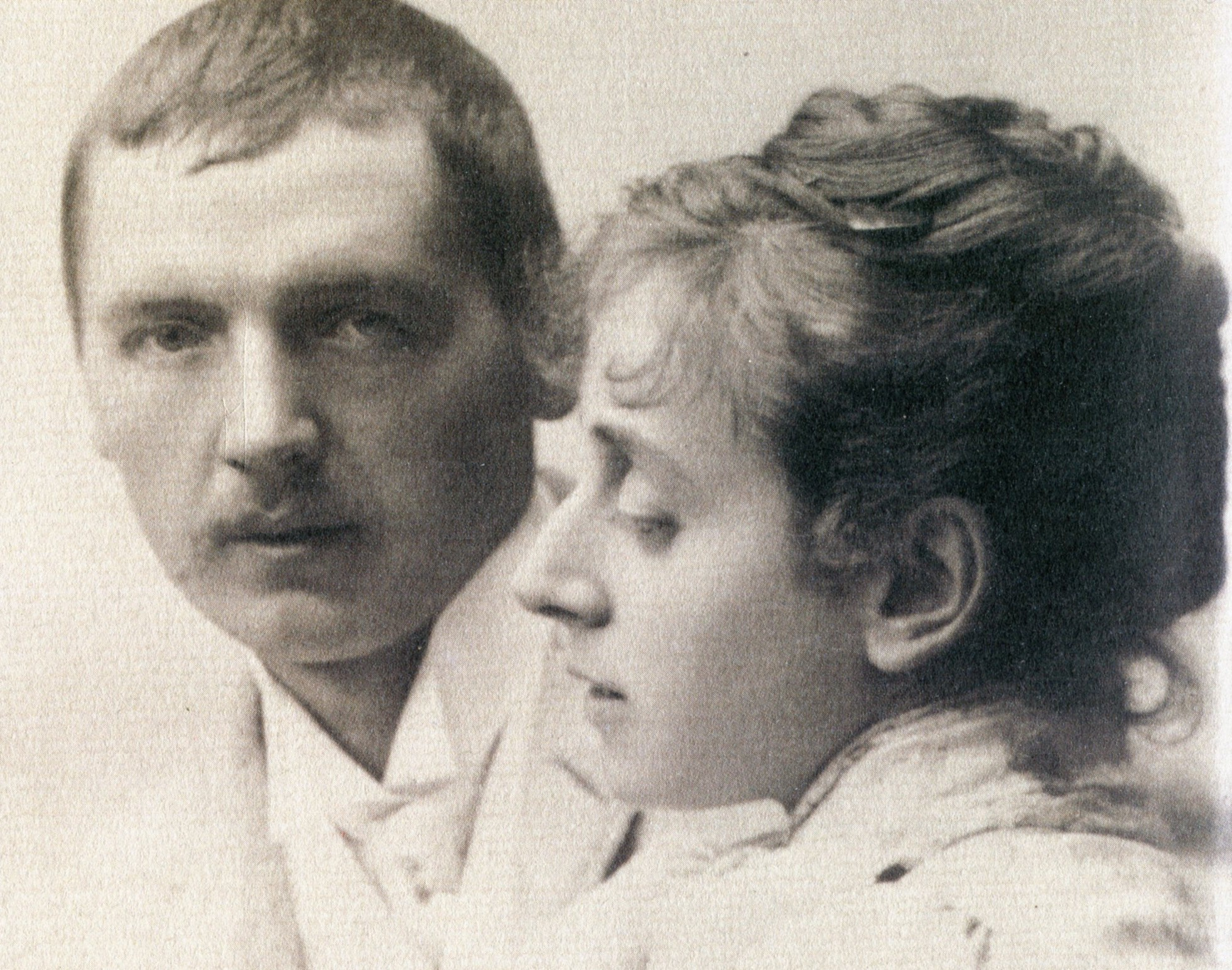
Anders and Emma Zorn c. 1885

The Bellman Prize (Swedish: Bellmanpriset) is a literature prize for "an outstanding Swedish poet" awarded yearly by the Swedish Academy (Swedish: Svenska Akademien) The prize was first established by Anders Zorn (1860–1920) and his wife Emma Lamm (1860–1942). In 1920, they had established the Emma and Anders Zorn's Donation Fund Foundation (Swedish: Stiftelsen Emma och Anders Zorns donationsfond). A donation from the foundation was used to fund the Swedish Academy-Bellman Prize.

== Recipients ==
- 1943 – Bo Bergman
- 1944 – Vilhelm Ekelund
- 1945 – Pär Lagerkvist
- 1946 – Sigfrid Siwertz
- 1947 – Anders Österling
- 1948 – Hjalmar Gullberg
- 1949 – Bertil Malmberg
- 1950 – Evert Taube
- 1951 – Harry Martinson
- 1952 – Erik Blomberg
- 1953 – Gunnar Ekelöf
- 1954 – Johannes Edfelt
- 1955 – Nils Ferlin
- 1956 – Rabbe Enckell
- 1957 – Olof Lagercrantz
- 1958 – Erik Lindegren
- 1959 – Werner Aspenström
- 1960 – Karl Vennberg
- 1961 – Gunnar Ekelöf
- 1962 – Harry Martinson
- 1963 – Elsa Grave
- 1964 – Artur Lundkvist
- 1965 – Sven Alfons
- 1966 – Bo Bergman and Tomas Tranströmer
- 1967 – Gunnar Ekelöf and Östen Sjöstrand
- 1968 – Lars Forssell
- 1969 – Anders Österling
- 1970 – Ebba Lindqvist
- 1971 – Johannes Edfelt
- 1972 – Stig Sjödin
- 1973 – Sandro Key-Åberg
- 1974 – Birger Norman
- 1975 – Petter Bergman
- 1976 – Maria Wine
- 1977 – Karl Ragnar Gierow
- 1978 – Bo Setterlind
- 1979 – Göran Sonnevi
- 1980 – Werner Aspenström
- 1981 – Lars Forssell
- 1982 – Artur Lundkvist
- 1983 – Tobias Berggren
- 1984 – Bengt Emil Johnson
- 1985 – Kjell Espmark
- 1986 – Solveig von Schoultz
- 1987 – Ragnar Thoursie
- 1988 – Lennart Sjögren
- 1989 – Folke Isaksson
- 1990 – Lars Gustafsson
- 1991 – Ingemar Leckius
- 1992 – Gunnar Harding
- 1993 – Anna Rydstedt
- 1994 – Katarina Frostenson
- 1995 – Lars Lundkvist
- 1996 – Lasse Söderberg
- 1997 – Eva Runefelt
- 1998 – Björner Torsson
- 1999 – Bruno K. Öijer
- 2000 – Jesper Svenbro
- 2001 – Olle Adolphson
- 2002 – Kristina Lugn
- 2003 – Tua Forsström
- 2004 – Gunnar D. Hansson
- 2005 – Eva Ström
- 2006 – Stig Larsson
- 2007 – Claes Andersson
- 2008 – Arne Johnsson
- 2009 – Ann Jäderlund
- 2010 – Magnus William-Olsson
- 2011 – Birgitta Lillpers
- 2012 – Lars Norén
- 2013 – Eva-Stina Byggmästar
- 2014 – Ingela Strandberg
- 2015 – Barbro Lindgren
- 2016 – Göran Sonnevi
- 2017 – Lennart Sjögren
- 2018 – Tua Forsström
- 2019 – Gösta Ågren
- 2020 – Eva Runefelt
- 2021 – Åsa Maria Kraft
- 2022 – Jenny Tunedal
- 2023 – Agneta Enckell
- 2024 – Nils-Åke Hasselmark
- 2025 – Helena Eriksson

== See also ==
- Carl Michael Bellman
- Zorn Badge
