= Verena Reichel =

German literary translator (1945–2022)

- Born: 21 March 1945; Grimma, Saxony, Germany
- Died: 9 February 2022 (aged 76); Munich, Germany
- Occupation: Literary translator
- Website: http://www.verenareichel.de/

Verena Reichel (21 March 1945 – 9 February 2022) was a German literary translator.

Bilingual from childhood, she later studied Scandinavian literature, German literature, and theater. Since 1972, she has worked as a freelance translator from Swedish, Norwegian, and Danish. She has published more than 60 volumes of translations from Swedish, including three by Ingmar Bergman, six by Henning Mankell, and four each by Märta Tikkanen and Torgny Lindgren. Especially notable are her translations of Lars Gustafsson: eighteen novels, three co-authored works, and poems gathered in Ein Vormittag in Schweden (1998; co-translators were Hans Magnus Enzensberger and Hanns Grössel; Reichel edited the volume and wrote an afterword) and in Jahrhunderte und Minuten (2009; with the same co-translators).

Verena Reichel was a member of the Association of German-speaking Translators of Literary and Scientific Works (Verband deutschsprachiger Übersetzer literarischer und wissenschaftlicher Werke, VdÜ) within the Association of German Writers (Verband Deutscher Schriftsteller). Among her awards are: the 1987 Translation Prize of the Swedish Academy, the Helmut M. Braem Prize in 1992, the Petrarca Prize in 1995, also in 1995 the Nossack Academy Award of the Academy of Sciences and Literature in Mainz (together with Lars Gustafsson), in 1998 the Jane Scatcherd Prize, and in 2008 the Johann Heinrich Voss Prize for translation.

The Petrarca Prize was awarded in particular for Reichel's translations of novels by Lars Gustafsson and the poetry of Katarina Frostenson, Lars Gustafsson, Johannes Edfelt, and Madeleine Gustafsson.

== Translations ==
- Lars Andersson: Der Eistaucher, Munich 1986
- Ingmar Bergman: Einzelgespräche, Munich 1996
- Ingmar Bergman: Sonntagskinder, Cologne 1996
- Ingmar Björkstén: Entzweiungen, Munich 1984
- Monica Braw: Frauen in Japan, Frankfurt am Main 1982
- Tomas von Brömssen: Schweres Gras, Frankfurt am Main 1992
- Per Olov Enquist: Mann im Pool, Düsseldorf 1985
- Per Olov Enquist: Strindberg, Darmstadt [u. a.] 1985
- Katarina Frostenson: Die in den Landschaften verschwunden sind, Munich 1999
- Nils Gredeby: Herrn Leonhards Kinder, Frankfurt am Main 1990
- Marianne Greenwood: Reise in meinem Adreßbuch, Reinbek bei Hamburg 1991
- Lars Gustafsson: Auszug aus Xanadu (Exit from Xanadu), Munich 2003 (co-translated with Hans Magnus Enzensberger)
- Lars Gustafsson: Blom und die zweite Magenta (Blom and the Second Magenta), Munich 2001
- Lars Gustafsson: Der Dekan, Munich 2004
- Lars Gustafsson: Die dritte Rochade des Bernard Foy (The Third Castling of Bernard Foy), Munich 1986
- Lars Gustafsson: Erzählungen von glücklichen Menschen (Tales of Happy People), Munich 1981
- Lars Gustafsson: Das Familientreffen (The Family Reunion), Munich 1976
- Lars Gustafsson: Geheimnisse zwischen Liebenden (Secrets between Lovers), Munich 1997
- Lars Gustafsson: Herr Gustafsson persönlich (Mr. Gustafsson Himself), Munich 1972
- Lars Gustafsson: Nachmittag eines Fliesenlegers (Afternoon of a Tiler), Munich 1991
- Lars Gustafsson: Onkel Knutte und andere Erzählungen, Ravensburg 1991
- Lars Gustafsson: Palast der Erinnerung, Munich 1996
- Lars Gustafsson: Die Sache mit dem Hund (The Tale of a Dog), Munich 1994
- Lars Gustafsson: Das seltsame Tier aus dem Norden und andere Merkwürdigkeiten (The Strange Animal from the North and Other Oddities), Munich 1989
- Lars Gustafsson: Sigismund, Munich 1977
- Lars Gustafsson: Die Stille der Welt vor Bach (The Silence of the World before Bach), Munich 1982
- Lars Gustafsson: Die Tennisspieler, Munich 1979
- Lars Gustafsson: Der Tod eines Bienenzüchters (The Death of a Beekeeper), Munich 1978
- Lars Gustafsson: Trauermusik (Funeral Music), Munich 1984
- Lars Gustafsson: Die unnötige Gegenwart, Munich 1975
- Lars Gustafsson: Vier Poeten, Munich 1991
- Lars Gustafsson: Vorbereitungen für die Wintersaison, Munich 1992
- Lars Gustafsson: Windy erzählt, Munich 1999
- Lars Gustafsson: Wollsachen, Munich 1974
- Madeleine Gustafsson: Die Lawine hinauf, Munich 1988
- Lennart Hagerfors: Der lachende Kongolese, Reinbek bei Hamburg 1991
- Lennart Hagerfors: Der Sarekmann, Reinbek bei Hamburg 1993
- Lennart Hagerfors: Die Wale im Tanganjikasee, Reinbek bei Hamburg 1987
- Helle Helle: Haus und Heim, Stuttgart 2001
- Peter Fröberg Idling, Gesang für einen aufziehenden Sturm, Berlin 2015
- Per Christian Jersild: Das Haus zu Babel, Cologne 1978
- Per Christian Jersild: Die Insel der Kinder, Cologne 1978
- Per Christian Jersild: Stielauge, Zurich 1985
- Eyvind Johnson: Reise ins Schweigen, Berlin 1975
- Leo Klüger: Lache, denn morgen bist du tot, Munich 1998
- Torgny Lindgren: Bathseba, Munich 1987
- Torgny Lindgren: Das Höchste im Leben, Munich 2003
- Torgny Lindgren: Hummelhonig, Munich 1997
- Torgny Lindgren: Die Legende vom Lügen, Munich 1989
- Per Lysander: Die Speckpferde, Frankfurt am Main 1989
- Anneli Mäkelä: Flußpferde, Frankfurt am Main 1995
- Henning Mankell: Der Chronist der Winde, Vienna 2000
- Henning Mankell: Ich sterbe, aber die Erinnerung lebt, Vienna 2004
- Henning Mankell: Die rote Antilope, Vienna 2001
- Henning Mankell: Tea-Bag, Vienna 2003
- Merete Mazzarella: Heimkehr vom Fest, Reinbek bei Hamburg 1996
- Merete Mazzarella: Zuerst verkauften sie das Klavier, Reinbek bei Hamburg 1994
- Ingegerd Monthan: Die Geschichte vom Baum, Frankfurt am Main 1987
- Peter Nilson: Der Goldnagel, Stuttgart 1988
- Anders Olsson: Berliner Tagebuch, Münster 1987
- Anna-Karin Palm: Der Faun, Reinbek bei Hamburg 1994
- Anna-Karin Palm: In die Wüste, Frankfurt am Main 2004
- Anna-Karin Palm: Die Töchter des Malers, Frankfurt am Main 1999
- Kristian Petri: Die Insel am Ende des Meeres, Munich 1999
- Agneta Pleijel: Ein paar Sommerabende auf Erden, Reinbek bei Hamburg 1988
- Elisabeth Rynell: Schneeland, Munich 2000
- Astrid Saalbach: Die Ballettstunde, Vienna 1988
- Hjalmar Söderberg: Doktor Glas, Reinbek bei Hamburg 1992
- Eva Ström: Das Krötenaquarium, Frankfurt am Main 1989
- Richard Swartz: Ein Haus in Istrien, Munich 2001
- Märta Tikkanen: Arnaia - ins Meer geworfen, Reinbek bei Hamburg 1993
- Märta Tikkanen: Aus Liebe, Reinbek bei Hamburg 1989
- Märta Tikkanen: Der große Fänger, Reinbek bei Hamburg 1990
- Märta Tikkanen: Die Liebesgeschichte des Jahrhunderts, Reinbek bei Hamburg 1981
- Märta Tikkanen: Der Schatten unter dem du lebst, Reinbek bei Hamburg 1985
- Märta Tikkanen: Ein Traum von Männern, nein, von Wölfen, Reinbek bei Hamburg 1987
- Märta Tikkanen: Persönliche Fragen, Reinbek bei Hamburg 1997
- Märta Tikkanen: Wie vergewaltige ich einen Mann?, Reinbek bei Hamburg 1980.
- Lars Johan Werle: Animalen, Munich 1982

== Works ==
Die Beschreibung einer Zeit durch drei Variationen einer Lebensgeschichte in Lars Gustafssons Romanzyklus "Spickorna i muren" (The Description of an Era through Three Variations on a Life Story in Lars Gustafsson's Novel Cycle "Spickorna i muren" [The Cracks in the Wall]), Cologne 1977

Widerspruchsgeist statt Waldesrauschen (Spirit of Contradiction, not Forest Murmurs), Munich 1987

== Editor ==
Lars Gustafsson: Ein Vormittag in Schweden (A Morning in Sweden), Munich 1998
