= Katarina Frostenson =

Swedish poet and writer (born 1953)

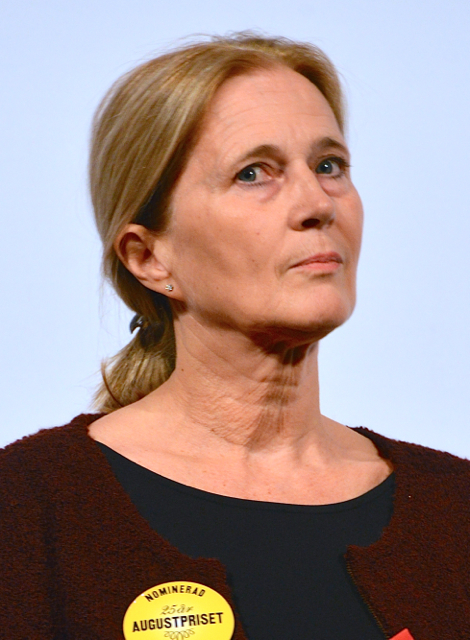
- Katarina Frostenson, 2012
- Born: Alma Katarina Frostenson; 5 March 1953 (age 73); Stockholm, Sweden
- Occupations: Author, poet, translator
- Spouse: Jean‐Claude Arnault (1989–)
- Relatives: Georg Frostenson (father); Anna-Britta Elmdahl (mother); Anders Frostenson (uncle)
- Writing career
- Language: Swedish
- Period: 1978–
- Notable works: Joner; Staden - en opera; Flodtid; Sånger och formler
- Notable awards: Nordic Council Literature Prize (2016)

Member of the Swedish Academy (Seat No. 18)
- In office 20 December 1992 – 18 January 2019
- Preceded by: Artur Lundkvist
- Succeeded by: Tua Forsström

Alma Katarina Frostenson Arnault (born 5 March 1953) is a Swedish poet and writer. She was a member of the Swedish Academy from 1992 to 2019. In 2003, Frostenson was made a Chevalier of the Legion of Honour in France in recognition of her services to literature.

Frostenson is one of Sweden's foremost poets, whose style unites experimental, traditional and archaic elements with a preoccupation with the materiality of language. She has published over two dozen books, primarily poetry. Debuting in 1978 with I mellan (In-Between), she rose to critical acclaim with her collections in the 1980s and 1990s, including Den andra (The Other, 1982), I det gula (In the Yellow, 1985) and Joner (Ions, 1991), which is often seen as one of the most notable collections of Swedish poetry in the twentieth century. She has also written as a dramatist and as a translator from French. Her book of lyrical prose Berättelser från dom (Stories from Them, 1992), about an ancient people who, through the loss of language, lose their sense of belonging in the world.

Her many honors include the Great Prize of the Society of Nine (1989), the Bellman Prize (1994), the Swedish Radio Prize for Lyrical Poetry (1996), the Erik Lindegren Prize (2004), the Ekelöf Prize (2007), the Nordic Council Literature Prize (2016) and the Litteris et Artibus medal (2007).

== Early life ==
She was born in Stockholm. Her parents were Georg Frostenson (1909–2002) and Anna-Britta Elmdahl (1917–2014). Her uncle Anders Frostenson was married to politician Ulla Lidman-Frostenson (1910–1962), who was Susanna Ramel's elder maternal half-sister.

== Poetry ==
Frostenson's work is frequently described as performing a kind of linguistic skepticism (the belief that language is perpetually insufficient to represent reality or contain any essential truth), and as isolating the paradox of using language as the means of its own critique or deconstruction. These limits of language in calling forth reality and experience is also one of the main themes of Frostenson's work. Her poetry attempts to bring forth experience rather than describe it. In her poetry collections, Frostenson combines shorter poems and longer narrative poems, often with a sense of fragmentation that attempt to convey images or emotions of a specific moment.

Along with a group of other Swedish women poets emerging in the 1980s such as Ann Jäderlund and Birgitta Lillpers, Frostenson's work evinces an attempt to communicate outside of a realm dominated by male writers, focusing on sounds and image rather than a united logos and coherent semantics. Frostenson's poetry stands out in Swedish literary history for its radical linguistic experimentation through a blend of the archaic and the avant-garde; its focus on the intricate sonic qualities of the Swedish language; its references to classical mythology, folksongs, ballads, and canonical Western literary and philosophical figures; and its general lack of metaphor and descriptive language. Her work is orientated towards drawing attention to the material elements of language, that is, sounds, while also being attuned to, playing with, and deconstructing the semantic elements formed out of the phonetic building blocks in search of a purer, authentic or genuine kind of language. The same can be said regarding her plays, maybe especially so regarding her first play Traum where words take on new meanings depending on intonation and stress on unexpected syllables.

One could say that Frostenson attempts to eliminate all barriers which disrupt emotional and sensory communication. The experience of language's shortcomings is more authentic than its inability to communicate truth. Rather than relying on metaphors and complex attempts at reproducing in language the complexities of human experience, Frostenson's poetry instead gathers fragments of images, emotions, and sounds. Often, each image or feeling appears with an unexpected opposition, creating a dissonance of meaning. For Frostenson, the human senses are more faithful to experience and thus more trustworthy than language as a means of communication.

Frostenson's oeuvre is one of the most influential in Swedish literature. Known first and foremost as a poet, she has published fourteen collections of poetry as well as several works of prose, drama, (creative) nonfiction, translations from French, as well as the libretto for Sven-David Sandström's opera Staden (The City, 1998). In addition to being nominated for Sweden's largest literary prize, the August Prize, three times (for Joner in 1991, for Tal och regn [Speech and Rain] in 2008, and for Tre vägar [Three Paths] in 2013), Frostenson has won nearly all the poetry prizes in Sweden and in 2016 was awarded the Nordic Council Literature Prize for her 2015 collection Sånger och formler (Songs and Formulae). She was made a knight of the French Legion of Honor in 2003. Her work has been translated into over ten languages, most notably to French, German, and Italian.

=== Joner (1991) ===
Frostenson's most notable poetry collection is Joner (Ions) from 1991, which is considered her major breakthrough, a milestone in her authorship and a canonical, watershed moment in the Swedish poetic tradition. It is inspired by the gruesome murder of Catrine da Costa, whose remains were found dismembered in two plastic bags, her head was never found, and her murder was never solved. The case would also inspire at least two groundbreaking literary works, including Stieg Larsson's crime novel Män som hatar kvinnor (The Girl with the Dragon Tattoo, 2005) and Sara Stridsberg's novel Kärlekans Antarktis (Antarctica of Love). At that time the author of six collections of poetry, Joner brought Frostenson the attention that would result in her election to the Swedish Academy the following year. Given Frostenson's then established public persona as mysterious, esoteric, and (at least somewhat) elitist, no one had expected Frostenson to engage in public debate, let alone the debate surrounding da Costa's murder, and the image of her dead body. As Cecelia Sjöholm writes,

the weight of Frostenson's text cannot by detached from the emblematic importance of a beheaded woman that Frostenson was evoking, indicating a wide array of literary and philosophical questions that can be raised by the image of a severed female body. Intertwining an Orphic theme where the positions of Orpheus and Eurydice are reversed, Frostenson examines the question of representation through an actual event and its treatment in the media while invoking the complexities of the Orphic myth; its space and time are shown to be gendered.

In addition to presenting the intertextual and gendered intricacies of Frostenson's poetic language, Sjöholm's claims offer a counterpoint to the received perception of Frostenson as a poet "without social relevance," which some scholars such as Anders Olsson have pointed out.

== 2018 Swedish Academy controversies ==
Frostenson and her husband Jean-Claude Arnault ran a venue for showcasing art in Stockholm called Forum. The club received funding from the Swedish Academy, which sparked allegations of conflicts of interest. Thus in 2018, Frostenson was accused of corruption contemporaneous with the accusations of sexual assault and corruption leveled against Arnault. Frostenson was also accused of having leaked names of Nobel Prize laureates to Arnault before they were announced. However, it was discovered that it was commonplace for family members of Academy members to know who was receiving the prize ahead of announcement, according to Ebba Witt-Brattström, ex-wife of Academy member Horace Engdahl. The Academy ultimately decided against expelling Frostenson, which prompted the resignation of three academy members. Frostenson protested that she should not be punished for the wrongdoings of her husband. Nevertheless, she did ultimately and voluntarily withdraw from the academy receiving a lifelong compensation of 12,875 Swedish kronor per month and the right to continue to live in an apartment owned by the Academy.

== Bibliography ==
=== Poetry ===
- I mellan (1978)
- Rena land (1980)
- Den andra (1982)
- I det gula: tavlor, resor, ras (1985)
- Samtalet (1987)
- Stränderna (1989)
- Joner : tre sviter (1991)
  - Romanian translation: Ioni, tr. Gabriela Melinescu (2003)
  - Italian translation: La fonte del suono, tr. Enrico Tiozzo (2011)
- Tankarna (1994)
  - German translation: Die in den Landschaften verschwunden sind, tr. Verena Reichel (1999)
- Jan Håfström: en diktsvit till Jan Håfström och till verk av honom (1994)
- Korallen (1999)
  - Spanish translation: El coral, tr. Víctor Rojas (2003)
- Karkas : fem linjer (2004)
- Tal och regn (2008)
  - German translation: Sprache und Regen, tr. Verena Reichel (2016)
- Flodtid (2011)
  - Danish translation: Flodtid, tr. Pia Tafdrup (2013)
- Sånger och formler (2015)
  - French translation: Violente la chanson, tr. Marie-Hélène Archambaud (2019)
  - Italian translation: Canti e formule, tr. Enrico Tiozzo (2023)
  - English translation: The Space of Time, tr. Bradley Harmon (2024)
- Sju grenar (2018)
  - Italian translation: Sette rami, tr. Enrico Tiozzo (2021)
- A – Andra tankar (2021)
  - Italian translation: A. Altri pensieri, tr. Enrico Tiozzo (2022)

Prose

- Raymond Chandler och filmen (1978)
- Lars Ahlins Huset har ingen filial (1978)
- Moira (1990)
- Berättelser från dom (1992)
- Artur Lundkvist: inträdestal i Svenska Akademien (1992)
- Skallarna (with Aris Fioretos)
- Tre vägar (2013)
  - Italian translation: Tre vie, tr. Enrico Tiozzo (2015)
- K (2019)
- F (2020)
- Alma (2023)

Drama/Opera

- 4 monodramer (1990)
  - Serbian translation: Monodrame (1997)
  - Polish translation: 4 monodramy (1999)
- 3 monodramer (1995)
- Traum : Sal P (två skådespel) (1996)
  - Croatian translation: Salpetrijer (2002)
- Kristallvägen/Safirgränd (2000)
- Ordet : en passion (2006)
- Staden: en opera (1998) (music by Sven-David Sandström)

Photobooks (with Jean-Claude Arnault)

- Överblivet (1989)
- Vägen till öarna (1996)
- Endura (2002)

Translations

- 1986 – Emmanuel Bove: Mina vänner (Mes amis)
- 1987 – Henri Michaux: Bräsch: texter i urval (with Ulla Bruncrona)
- 1988 – Marguerite Duras: Lol V. Steins hänförelse (Le ravissement de Lol V. Stein)
- 1990 – Georges Bataille: Himlens blå (Le bleu du ciel)

== Prizes and awards ==
- 1988 – Gerard Bonniers lyrikpris
- 1989 – De Nios stora pris
- 1994 – Bellman Prize for Tankarna
- 1996 – Sveriges Radios lyrikpris
- 2004 – Erik Lindegren-priset
- 2004 – Ferlinpriset
- 2004 – Henrik Steggen Prize
- 2007 – Ekelöfpriset
- 2007 – Litteris et Artibus
- 2016 – Nordic Council Literature Prize (for Sånger och formler)
- 2016 – Karlfeldtpriset

Cultural offices
Preceded by Artur Lundkvist	Swedish Academy, Seat No.18; 1992–2019	Succeeded by Tua Forsström
