= Kyrklund =

Kyrklund is a surname. Notable people with the surname include:

- Kyra Kyrklund (born 1951), Finnish dressage rider and trainer
- Willy Kyrklund (1921–2009), Finnish writer
