= Anders Olsson =

Anders Olsson may refer to:

- Anders Olsson (writer) (born 1949), Swedish writer and member of the Swedish Academy
- Anders Olsson (swimmer) (born 1965), Swedish swimmer and triathlete
