= Swedish Academy Nordic Prize =

- Awarded for: the Nordic writer who has done significant work in any of the Academy's areas of operations or interests
- Date: 1986
- Location: Stockholm, Stockholm
- Country: Sweden
- Presented by: Swedish Academy
- Reward: A monetary award of SEK 400,000
- Currently held by: Sjón

The Nordic Prize (Swedish: nordiska pris) is a literary award presented annually by the Swedish Academy. The recipient is someone from the Nordic countries who has done significant work in any of the Academy's areas of operations or interests. The inaugural award was in 1986 and was founded with a donation from Karen and Karl Ragnar Gierows. The prize amount consists of kr 400,000. The prize has been referred to as the "little Nobel" because it is awarded by the same Academy that gives the Nobel Prize.

== Recipients ==
Year	Picture	Laureate	Country	Language(s)	Genre(s)	References
1986		Villy Sørensen (1929–2001)	Denmark	Danish	short story, philosophy, literary criticism	
1987		William Heinesen (1900–1991)	Faroe Islands	Danish	poetry, novel, short story	
1988		Nils Erik Enkvist (1925–2009)	Finland	Finnish	literary criticism, linguistics	
1989		Rolf Jacobsen (1907–1994)	Norway	Norwegian	poetry	
1990		Henrik Nordbrandt (1945–2023)	Denmark	Danish	poetry, novel, essay	
1991		Tomas Tranströmer (1931–2015)	Sweden	Swedish	poetry, translation	
1992		Thor Vilhjálmsson (1925–2011)	Iceland	Icelandic	novel, short story	
1993		Paavo Haavikko (1931–2008)	Finland	Finnish	poetry, drama, essay	
1994		Inger Christensen (1935–2009)	Denmark	Danish	poetry, novel, essay	
1995		Lars Ahlin (1915–1997)	Sweden	Swedish	novel	
1996		Arne Næss (1912–2009)	Norway	Norwegian	philosophy	
1997		Bo Carpelan (1926–2011)	Finland	Finnish	poetry, novel	
1998		Lars Forssell (1928–2007)	Sweden	Swedish	poetry, drama, songwriting	
1999		Klaus Rifbjerg (1931–2015)	Denmark	Danish	novel, short story, essay, drama, poetry	
2000		Lars Huldén (1926–2016)	Finland	Finnish	translation, linguistics	
2001		Willy Kyrklund (1921–2009)	Sweden	Finnish and Swedish	short story, novel, essay	
2002		Torben Brostrøm (1927–2020)	Denmark	Danish	essay, literary criticism	
2003		Lars Norén (1944–2021)	Sweden	Swedish	drama, novel, poetry	
2004		Guðbergur Bergsson (1932–2023)	Iceland	Icelandic	novel, short story, translation	
2005		Göran Sonnevi (b. 1939)	Sweden	Swedish	poetry, translation	
2006		Pia Tafdrup (b. 1952)	Denmark	Danish	poetry, novel, drama	
2007		Jon Fosse (b. 1959)	Norway	Norwegian	novel, drama, poetry, essay	
2008		Sven-Eric Liedman (b. 1939)	Sweden	Swedish	philosophy, essay	
2009		Kjell Askildsen (1929–2021)	Norway	Norwegian	short story, novel	
2010		Per Olov Enquist (1934–2020)	Sweden	Swedish	drama, novel	
2011		Ernst Håkon Jahr (b. 1948)	Norway	Norwegian	linguistics	
2012		Einar Már Guðmundsson (b. 1954)	Iceland	Icelandic	novel, short story, poetry, essay	
2013		Sofi Oksanen (b. 1977)	Finland	Finnish and English	poetry, drama, novel, essay	
2014		Lars Gustafsson (1936–2016)	Sweden	Swedish	poetry, novel, short stories	
2015		Thomas Bredsdorff (b. 1937)	Denmark	Danish	literary criticism	
2016		Monika Fagerholm (b. 1961)	Sweden	Swedish	novel, short story	
2017		Dag Solstad (1941–2025)	Norway	Norwegian	novel, short story, drama	
2018		Agneta Pleijel (b. 1940)	Sweden	Swedish	novel, drama, poetry, literarcy criticism	
2019		Karl Ove Knausgård (b. 1958)	Norway	Norwegian	novel, autobiography	
2020		Rosa Liksom (b. 1958)	Finland	Finnish	novel, short story	
2021		Eldrid Lunden (b. 1940)	Norway	Norwegian	poetry, essays	
2022		Naja Marie Aidt (b. 1963)	Denmark	Danish	poetry, short story, drama, novel	
2023		Sjón (b. 1962)	Iceland	Icelandic	poetry, novel, lyrics	
2024		Ingela Strandberg (b. 1944)	Sweden	Swedish	poetry, novel, drama, short story	
2025		Søren Ulrik Thomsen (b. 1956)	Denmark	Danish	poetry, essay	
