= Liedman =

Liedman is a surname. Notable people with the surname include:

- Gabe Liedman (fl. 2008), American comedian and comedy writer
- Sven-Eric Liedman (born 1939), Swedish historian
