= John Matthias (poet) =

American poet

John E. Matthias
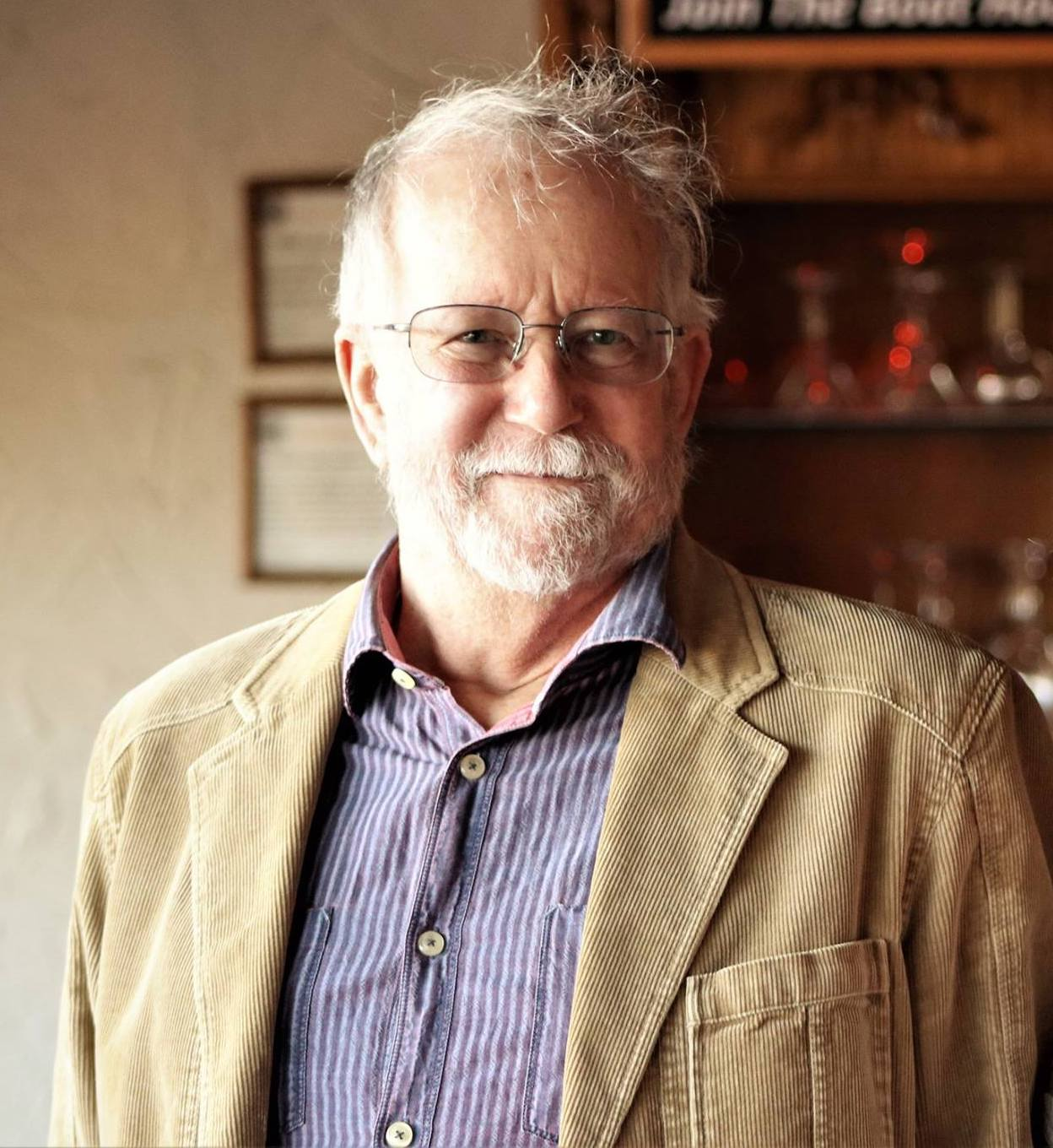
- Matthias in 2017
- Born: 1941 (age 84–85); Columbus, Ohio, US
- Occupations: poet, teacher
- Writing career
- Language: English language
- Website: english.nd.edu/people/faculty/emeritus/matthias/

John E. Matthias is an American poet living in South Bend, Indiana and an emeritus faculty member at the University of Notre Dame. He is the author of more than fourteen books of poetry and is the subject of two scholarly books. John Matthias served as the co-editor of an international literary journal, Notre Dame Review, for twenty years.

== Biography ==
Matthias, an American author, poet, literary scholar, was born in Columbus, Ohio. While still in high school, he studied with John Berryman at a summer writing conference at the University of Utah in 1959 and kept in touch with Berryman for the rest of the latter's life. Matthias attended the Ohio State University and Stanford University. While in graduate school at Stanford he studied under the poet and critic Yvor Winters but did not conform to Winters's anti-modernist position. In fact, Matthias became deeply interested in modernism, especially British modernism. His interest in British modernism was informed by many years of residence in England, editing the anthology 23 Modern British Poets, published in 1970. His peers at Stanford included two future poets laureate of the United States, Robert Hass and Robert Pinsky, as well as the poets Kenneth Fields, James L. McMichael, and John Peck. When he left Stanford in 1966, he spent a year in London as a Fulbright Scholar where he met Diana C. J. Adams (Feb. 5, 1945 - Nov. 26, 2020), and married her a year later.

Diana's distinguished family includes several artists and writers, including her brother-in-law Wayland Young (Lord Kennet), the sculptor Emily Young, and the novelist Louisa Young. Many of Matthias's poems deal with this family. In 1976 Matthias became a Visiting Fellow of Clare Hall, Cambridge, and has since 1977 been a Life Member. Although his main academic job has been at the University of Notre Dame, he has spent much of his professional life in Britain, where he did major scholarly work on the Anglo-Welsh poet and painter David Jones, editing both the poetry and essays on Jones's work for Faber and Faber, the National Poetry Foundation, and University of Wales Press.

Matthias's own family comes from the world of Ohio politics. His father, John M. Matthias, was a justice of the Ohio Supreme Court who followed his own father, Edward S. Matthias, on the high court bench. His mother, Lois Kirkpatrick Matthias, taught elementary school at the Ohio State University lab school where Matthias himself was a pupil from first grade to senior high school. There he met several contemporaries who became life-long friends, especially Joel Barkan, a scholar of African and American politics, who appears in his poems and in his novel, Different Kinds of Music.

At Notre Dame, Matthias initially taught courses in modern literature but, once an MFA program was established at the university, he taught more and more classes in creative writing. Many of his students have gone on to produce distinguished books. Matthias was for twenty years co-editor, with William O’Rourke, of the Notre Dame Review, an international literary journal, and he continues on the magazine as Editor at Large. Matthias also selected books for the Ernest Sandeen Poetry Prize for the University of Notre Dame Press. The prize is named for the Swedish-American poet who first hired him at Notre Dame. During his early years at Notre Dame, Matthias was closely associated with poets Peter Michelson and, in Chicago, Michael Anania, who was his first editor at Swallow Press. He collaborated for more than forty years with the Notre Dame artist Douglas Kinsey, who illustrated several of his books and provided monotypes for their jackets. More recently, he collaborated with printmaker Jean Dibble on a sequence of poster poems called "The HIJ". A third Notre Dame collaboration was with Serbian mathematician and poet Vladeta Vučković on a translation of the epic fragments known collectively as The Battle of Kosovo (1999).

He found better reception from publishers in England than in America, and began publishing his books with Anvil Press, Salt, and, most recently, Shearsman. During much of his time in Britain, Matthias led basically a non-academic, even an anti-academic life, living for the most part at his wife's house in the small village of Hacheston, Suffolk. There he entertained many literary friends, almost all of them outside the British establishment. These years also included periods of collaboration with his Swedish colleagues Göran Printz-Påhlson and Lars-Håkan Svensson on translations of Swedish Poetry, including the anthology Contemporary Swedish Poetry (1980) and the selected poems of Jesper Svenbro, Three-Toed Gull (2003). Matthias's own poems have been translated into many languages, with book-length selections appearing in Swedish and Italian. With Richard Burns, he was a member of the small group that founded the Cambridge Poetry Festival in 1973.

Major scholarly works on Matthias's poetry include the books Word Play Place: Essays on the Poetry of John Matthias (1998), edited by Robert Archambeau and The Salt Companion to John Matthias (2011), edited by Joe Francis Doerr. There is a substantial chapter on Matthias's poetry in Archambeau's study Laureates and Heretics (University of Notre Dame Press, 2010). Major essays appear in books by Gerald Bruns (What Are Poets For?), Mark Scroggins (Intricate Thicket), and Sally Connolly (Grief and Meter: Elegies for Poets after Auden). In 2004, an issue of Samizdat (poetry magazine) was devoted to commentary on his work.

== Bibliography ==
Poetry Bucyrus, (1970); Turns (1975); Crossing (1979); Bathory & Lermontov (1980); Northern Summer: New and Selected Poems (1984); A Gathering of Ways (1991); Beltane at Aphelion (1995); Swimming at Midnight: Selected Shorter Poems (1995); Working Progress, Working Title (2002); New Selected Poems (2004); Kedging (2007); Trigons (2010); Collected Shorter Poems, Vol. 1, 1961–1994 (2013); Collected Shorter Poems, Vol. 2, 1995–2011 (2011); Collected Longer Poems (2012); Complayntes for Doctor Neuro & Other Poems (Shearsman Books, 2016)

Essays Reading Old Friends (1992); Who Was Cousin Alice? and Other Questions (2011); At Large (Shearsman Books, 2016); “Living With A Visionary” (New Yorker Magazine, 2021)

Novels Different Kinds of Music (2014)

Plays Six Short Plays (2016)

Translations Contemporary Swedish Poetry (1980) (with Göran Printz-Påhlson); Jan Östergren: Rainmaker (1983) (with Göran Printz-Påhlson); The Battle of Kosovo (1987) (with Vladeta Vučković); Three-Toed Gull: Selected Poems of Jesper Svenbro (2003) (with Lars-Håkan Svensson)

Editions 23 Modern British Poets (1971); Introducing David Jones (1980); David Jones: Man and Poet (1989); Selected Works of David Jones (1992); Notre Dame Review: The First Ten Years (2009) (with William O’Rourke)
