= Gösta Nystroem =

Swedish composer (1890–1966)

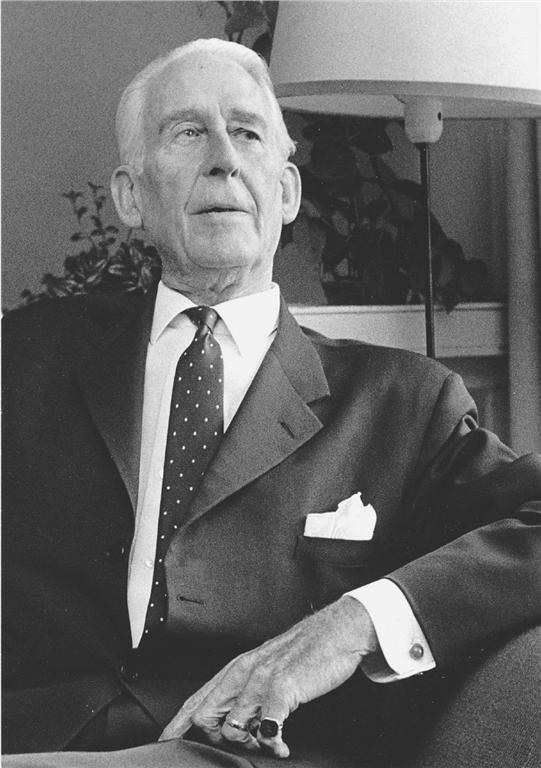
Gösta Nystroem, c. 1960

Gösta Nystroem (13 October 1890 – 9 August 1966) was a Swedish composer.

== Life and career ==
Nystroem, originally Nyström, was born in Silvberg, Sweden, a parish in the province of Dalarna, but spent most of his childhood in Österhaninge near Stockholm, at the time a small village but nowadays a suburban district. His father was a headmaster and an organist. In his younger days, Nystroem was both a composer and a painter (one of the first Swedish Cubists), but when he was about thirty years old, he eventually decided to focus on music.

He studied composition in Stockholm (at the Royal College of Music, Stockholm), Copenhagen, and Paris. He moved to Paris in 1919. Among his teachers in Paris were Vincent d'Indy and Leonid Sabaneyev. After living in France, mostly in Paris, for several years, he moved to Gothenburg on the Swedish west coast in the 1931, where he also worked as a music critic at Göteborgs Handels- och Sjöfartstidning. In 1934–36 he also worked as the curator at Göteborgs Konsthall. In the 1950s he settled in Särö, a rather wealthy village about twenty kilometres south of Gothenburg, where he had a house that originally belonged to the family of his first wife, Gladys Heyman, whom he married in 1921 in France. The couple had three daughters. Gladys died in 1946, and in 1950 Nystroem remarried. His second wife was Helen Lyon, who, like Gladys Heyman, came from an upper class Gothenburg family. Nystroem himself died in Särö.

In Sweden, Nystroem was regarded as a modernist in the 1930s, but in today's view, his music is only moderately modernistic. It is influenced by the French music of the time of his studies, but still has a Nordic, romantic tone, and is most often melancholic or sorrowful. As a person and artist Nystroem was dependent on the sea and preferred to live close to it.

Among Nystroem's most appreciated works are his romances. The most widely known collections are Sånger vid havet (Songs by the sea, with orchestra or piano, 1942), På reveln (At the reef, with piano, 1948) and Själ och landskap: nya sånger vid havet (Soul and landscape: new songs by the sea, with piano, 1950). The poet apparently closest to Nystroem's soul was the Swedish writer Ebba Lindqvist (1908–1995). They shared a deep relationship with the sea. Five settings to music of Lindqvist's poems are to be found in the romance collections mentioned above.

Nystroem composed six symphonies. Among these, Sinfonia espressiva (1932–37) and Sinfonia del mare (1946–48) are considered to be the best. Sinfonia espressiva grows from a slow first movement scored for strings and timpani. In the second and third movements, groups of wind instruments and percussion are added, and only the finale is scored for full orchestra. The sea symphony, Sinfonia del mare, is written in one continuous movement, picturing different moods inspired by the sea. It is Nystroem's most popular work and might be said to have overshadowed other important works in his output. In the middle of the symphony is a section where a soprano sings a setting of Lindqvist's poem "Det enda" ("The one") about a person who has fled from the sea, "as one flees from the beloved", but who will soon return to "sit by the sea and know it's the one on earth". Nystroem's other symphonies, seldom played, are Sinfonia breve (1929–31), Symphony No. 4 (1952, originally entitled Sinfonia shakespeariana), Sinfonia seria (1962–63), and Sinfonia tramontana (1965).

== Chronological worklist ==
- 1917 revised 1924 Rondo Capriccioso for violin & orchestra
- 1924 Regrets, 6 pieces for solo piano
- 1924–25 Arctic Ocean (Ishavet or La mer arctique), symphonic poem after an unfinished ballet
- 1925 Tower of Babel, symphonic poem
- 1929–30 Concerto for Strings No. 1
- 1929–31 Sinfonia Breve (Symphony No. 1)
- 1932–35 revised 1937 Sinfonia Espressiva (Symphony No. 2)
- 1934 The Tempest, incidental music to Shakespeare
- 1936 Merchant of Venice (Theatre Suite No. 4)
- 1940 Viola Concerto "Hommage à la France"
- 1940–44 revised 1951-2 Sinfonia Concertante for cello & orchestra
- 1942 Songs by the Sea, five songs for voice with orchestra or piano
- 1945 Ouverture Symphonique
- 1946–48 Sinfonia del Mare (Symphony No. 3) after Ebba Lindqvist, for soprano & orchestra
- 1948 At the Reef, for voice & piano
- 1950 Soul & Landscape, three Ebba Lindqvist poems for soprano & piano
- 1952 Sinfonia Shakespeariana (Symphony No. 4)
- 1952 Ungersvennen och de sex Prinsessorna, ballet
- 1953 Partita for flute, string orchestra & harp
- 1954–57 Violin Concerto
- 1955 Concerto for Strings No. 2
- 1956 String Quartet
- 1956 Tre havsvisioner, a three part series for eight-part mixed chorus
- 1958 Herr Arnes penningar, opera based on a novel by Selma Lagerlöf
- 1959 Piano Concerto "Concerto Ricercante"
- 195? Midsummer Dream, after Martinson, for soprano & piano
- 1962–63 Sinfonia Seria (Symphony No. 5)
- 1963 Sinfonia di Lontano
- 1964 Sommarmusik for soprano & orchestra
- 1965 Sinfonia Tramontana (Symphony No. 6)
