= Ingela Strandberg =

Swedish writer

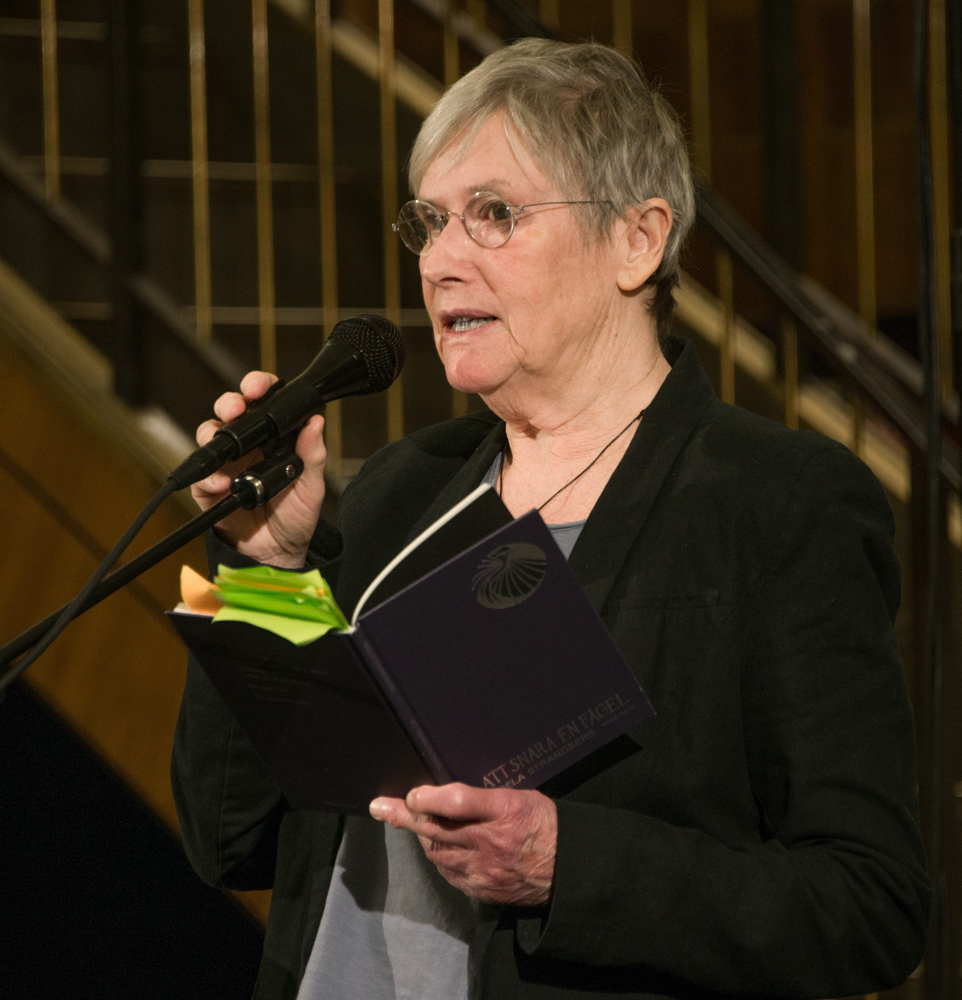
Ingela Strandberg in 2018

Ingela Strandberg (born 26 February 1944) is a Swedish poet, children's writer, novelist, playwright, translator, journalist and musician. She gained recognition with her novel Mannen som trodde att han var Fritiof Andersson (The Man who Thought he was Fritiof Andersson) in 1983.

== Biography ==
Born in Grimeton near Varberg in the Halland region of southern Sweden, her poetry frequently evokes her home landscape. Her most recent publication is Den stora tystnaden vid Sirius nos (The Great Silence of Sirius' Nose) published in 2014. Strandberg has also shown interest in music with her CD "Låt dom aldrig ta dig" (Don't Ever Let Them Take You) released in 2000. She has even been a screenwriter, creating Blank päls och starka tassar (Shiny Coat and Strong Paws) for television in 1993. She embarked on her literary career in 1974, concentrating mainly on poetry, some of which has been translated into English and French.

== Works ==
- Tomas får en vän 1973 (for children)
- Busiga Berta på vårberget 1974 (for children)
- Flickebarn 1974 (novel)
- Jenny, Petra och den mystiske mannen 1975 (for children)
- Vår snurrande jord och folkhemmet 1975 (poetry)
- Visor i vinden 1975 (poetry)
- Jenny, Petra och den mystiske mannen 1975 (poetry)
- Jan gör årets kupp 1976 (for children)
- Genom pärleporten 1976 (novel)
- I kvinnorum 1976 (novel)
- En lösdrivares söndag 1977 (poetry)
- Men kråkorna visste ingenting 1978 (poetry)
- Jordlöparen 1979 (poetry)
- Pojken mitt i världen 1979 (poetry)
- Hemligheter 1981 (poetry)
- Mannen som trodde att han var Fritiof Andersson 1982 (novel)
- Ett rum för natten 1984 (poetry)
- Genom brunnarna till havet 1987 (poetry)
- Väg 153 1991 (poetry)
- Blank päls och starka tassar 1991 (TV drama)
- Blues för snöigt landskap 1994 (poetry)
- Blank päls och starka tassar 1995 (novel)
- Lyssnaren 1997 (poetry)
- Lilla svarta hjärta 1999 (poetry)
- En indian i Seattle 2000 (novel)
- Häger på Stockholms central 2002 (poetry)
- Bäste herr Thoreau 2008 (poetry)
- En för att stanna, en för att gå 2011 (poetry)
- Den Stora Tystnaden vid Sirius nos 2014 (poetry)

== Awards ==
In December 2014, Strandberg was awarded the Swedish Academy's Bellman Prize for her outstanding contribution to Swedish poetry. She had already received the Dobloug Prize in 2009. In 2024 she was awarded the Swedish Academy Nordic Prize.
