= Kris (magazine) =

Swedish cultural magazine

Kris (meaning Crisis in English) was a culture magazine published in Sweden. It existed from 1975 to 1997.

== History and profile ==
The magazine was established by Stig Larsson and Åke Sandgren in Umeå in 1975. It was first named CODE, and it was renamed as Kris in 1977. The magazine was published between 1977 and 1997 by Föreningen KRIS.

The magazine featured articles on critique, philosophy and aesthetics. Horace Engdahl and Anders Olsson were part of the editorial staff.
