= After Having Spent a Night Among Horses =

1998 book by Tua Forsström

- Author: Tua Forsström
- Original title: Efter att ha tillbringat en natt bland hästar
- Language: Swedish
- Genre: poetry
- Published: 1998
- Publication place: Finland
- Awards: Nordic Council's Literature Prize of 1998

After Having Spent a Night Among Horses (Swedish: Efter att ha tillbringat en natt bland hästar) is a 1998 poetry collection by Finnish poet Tua Forsström. It won the Nordic Council's Literature Prize in 1998.
