= Anders Frostenson =

Swedish hymnwriter, priest, and writer

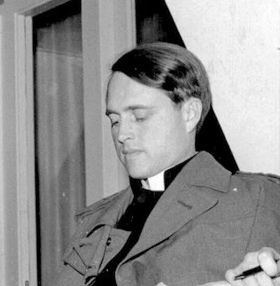
- Swedish hymnwriter and priest, Anders Frostenson
- Born: 23 April 1906; Loshult, Sweden
- Died: 4 April 2006 (aged 99); Örebro, Sweden
- Occupations: priest, writer, hymnwriter
- Children: 3

Anders Frostenson (23 April 1906 in Loshult, Sweden – 4 April 2006) was a Swedish hymnwriter, priest, and writer. He was a paternal uncle of Katarina Frostenson. He has three children and was divorced and re-married.

== Hymns list ==
The theme in his hymns is consistent, and are usually about God and Jesus Christ. In the year of 1937, nine of his written hymns were included in a Swedish hymn book, and even more were included in songbooks of free churches.

- Are There Toys in Heaven? (Finns det leksaker i himmelriket?) 1 language • 4 collections
- Faith, While Trees Are Still in Blossom (Tron sig sträcker efter Frukten) 1 language • 2 collections
- God Created All Things (Gud har skapat allting) 1 language • 4 collections
- How Can Creation’s Voice Be Still 1 language • 2 collections
- The Flames are Many (Lågorna är många) 1 language • 4 collections
- Your love, O God, is broad (Är Guds kärlek såsom havet) 4 languages • 6 collections
