= Thomas Bredsdorff =

Danish literary scholar and critic

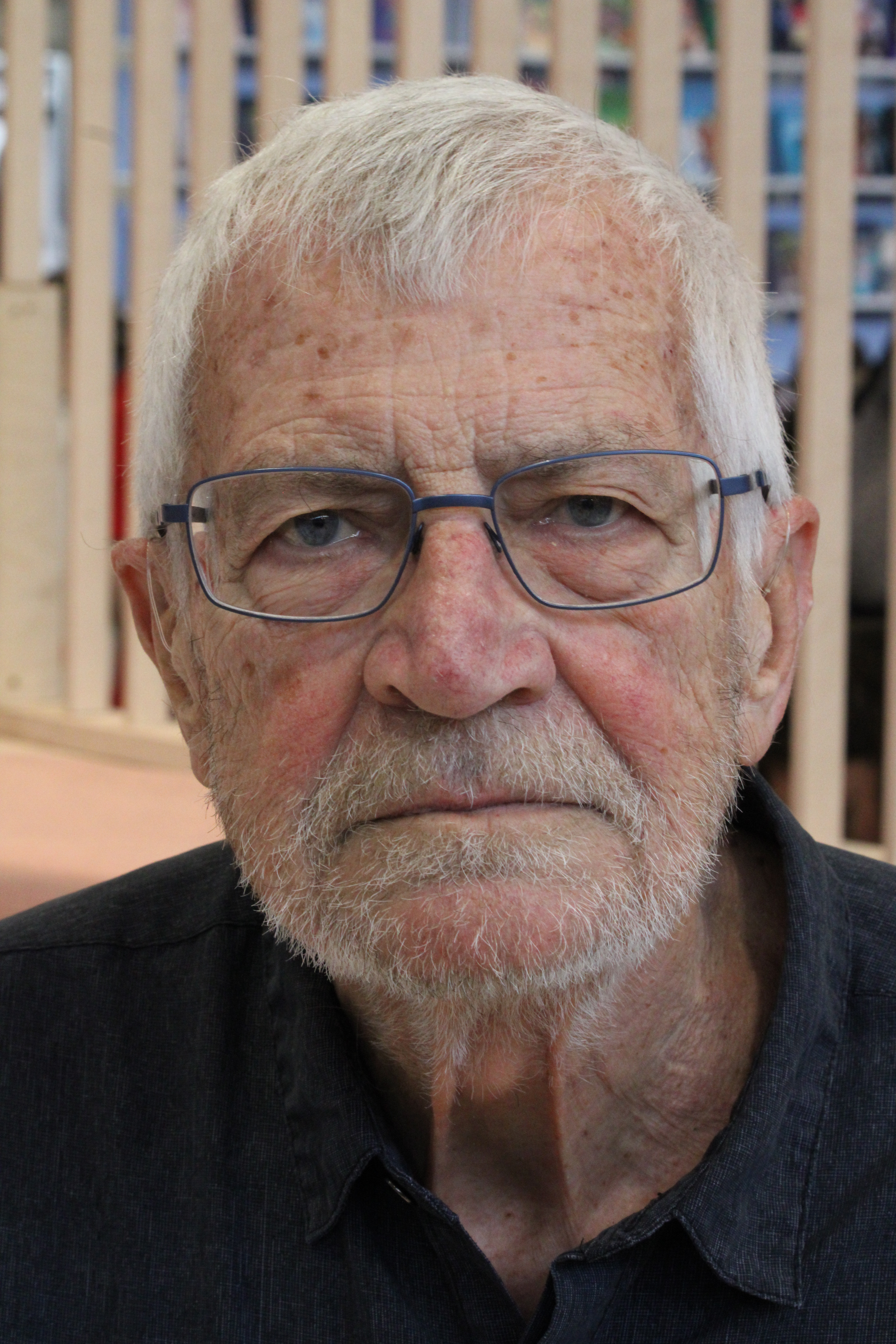
Bredsdorff in 2025

Thomas Bredsdorff (born 1 April 1937 in Silkeborg) is a Danish literary scholar and critic.

He received a Doctor of Philosophy in 1976 from the University of Copenhagen, where he was professor of Nordic literature from 1978 to 2004. He has written about books and culture for the Danish newspaper Politiken since 1965. He worked for Kristeligt Dagblad from 1959-1964. His books and articles are aimed at both academics and the general public.

Historically, Thomas Bredsdorff researched literature from the 13th through 20th centuries, but mainly focused on 18th-century literature, on which he wrote a thesis (Digternes natur, 1976) and which he later published as the dissertation Den brogede oplysning (2004).

He has been a guest lecturer and visiting professor at many universities abroad, including the University of California, Berkeley in 2005.

== Honors and awards ==
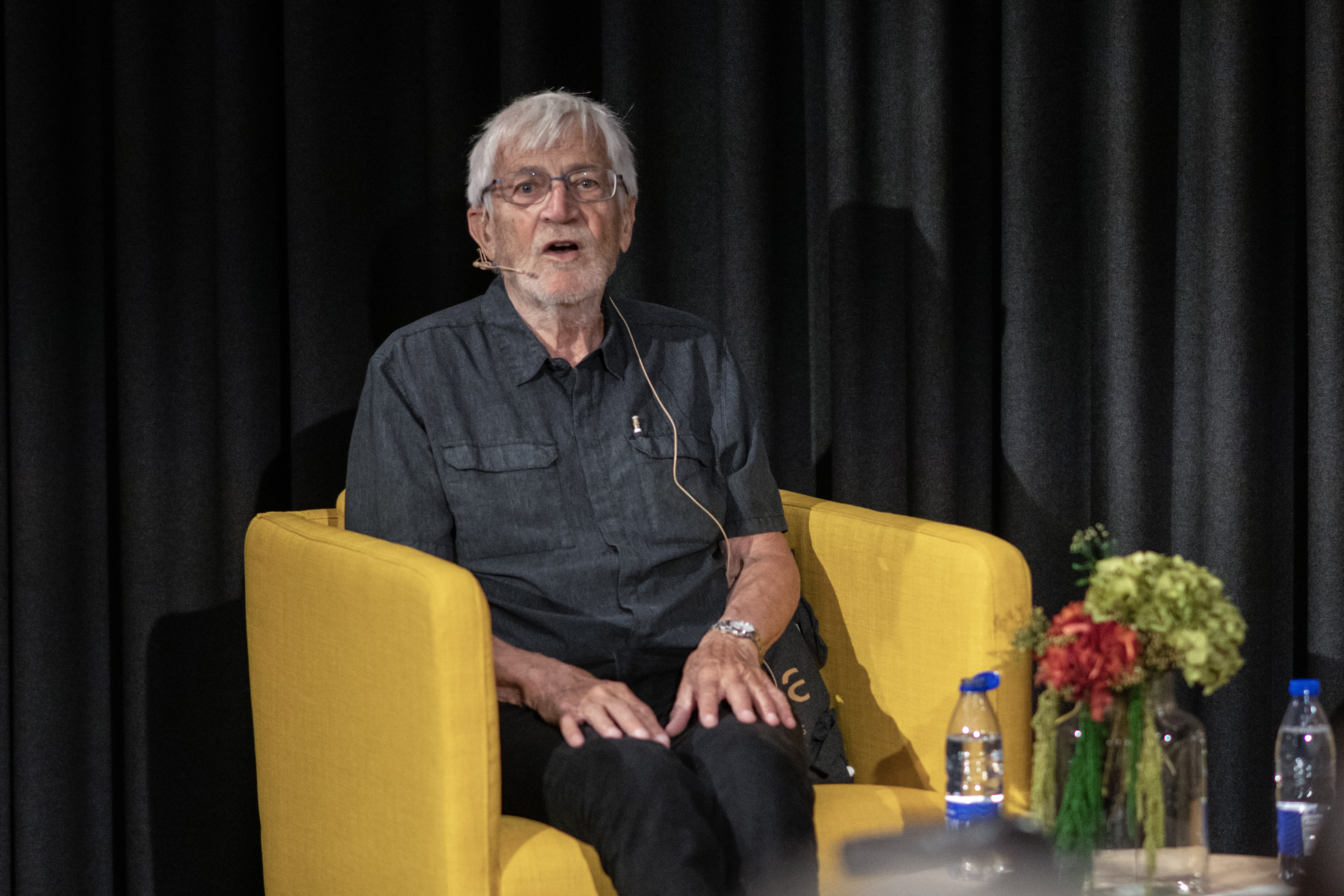
Thomas Bredsdorff

- 2001 University of Lund Honorary Doctorate
- 2001 Order of the Dannebrog Knight 1st Class
- 2015 Swedish Academy Nordic Prize

== Select works ==
- 1971 Kaos og kaerlighed – en studie i islaendingesagaers livsbillede
- 1979 Til glaeden – om humanisme og humaniora (in Swedish 1981)
- 1987 Den bratte forvandling – om digteren Sylvia Plath
- 1991 De sorte huller. Om tilblivelsen af et sprog i PO Enquists forfatterskab (in Swedish 1991)
- 2006 Dansk litteratur set fra månen. Om sjaelen i digtningen
- 2011 Ironiens pris
- 2013 Gør hvad du vil – men sig hvad det er. Erindringer
