= Willy Kyrklund =

Finnish Swedish-speaking author

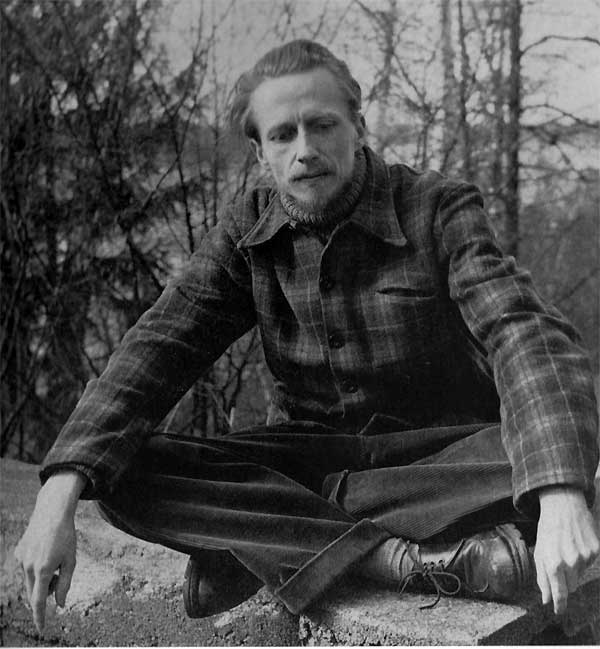
- Born: Paul Wilhelm Kyrklund; 27 February 1921; Helsinki, Finland
- Died: 27 June 2009 (aged 88); Uppsala, Sweden
- Education: Uppsala University
- Occupation: Author
- Writing career
- Language: Swedish
- Genre: Fiction

Paul Wilhelm "Willy" Kyrklund (27 February 1921 in Helsinki, Finland – 27 June 2009 in Uppsala) was a Finnish Swedish-speaking author who lived in Uppsala, Sweden.

He was the son of an engineer. During World War II, he served on the front. In 1944, he moved from Finland to Sweden, where he studied Chinese, Russian, Persian and mathematics. He also worked as a programmer.

Kyrklund's works of fiction are influenced by modernism; his early short stories resemble surrealism, in which the storyline is concealed by symbolism that contributes to conveying a mix of bitter irony, reconciliation and alienation. These characteristics of his writings, together with Kyrklund's own absurdities, to some extent resemble the work of Torgny Lindgren. However, in contrast to surrealism, Kyrklund's works are highly aware and well thought out.

Recurring themes are pointlessness and powerlessness, where good and bad meet in an ungraspable and sometimes deliberately incomprehensible greyscale. Man is not born to sin; there is no choice, and sin becomes unavoidable. Often sinful deeds loom, while the future sinner observes in confusion, uncomprehending and unable to change the course of events. However, Kyrklund succeeded in portraying his failing characters with great empathy and indulgence, yet with the distance of an observer. In his stories, he often applied classical motives from the Bible and the antique era – motives that are structurally eternal, patterns that can not be broken.

Kyrklund wrote a travelogue about his travels in Iran, Till Tabbas (To Tabbas) in the 1950s.

His works have been translated into French, German, Greek and Finnish, among other languages. Some works initially written as prose have been rewritten as drama.

== Awards and honors ==
On 2 June 1995 Kyrklund received an honorary doctorate from the Faculty of Humanities at Uppsala University, Sweden. In 2001, he won the Swedish Academy Nordic Prize, known as the 'little Nobel'.

== Bibliography ==
- Solange
- Mästaren Ma
- Tvåsam
- Polyfem förvandlad
