= Jesper Svenbro =

Swedish poet and classical philologist (born 1944)

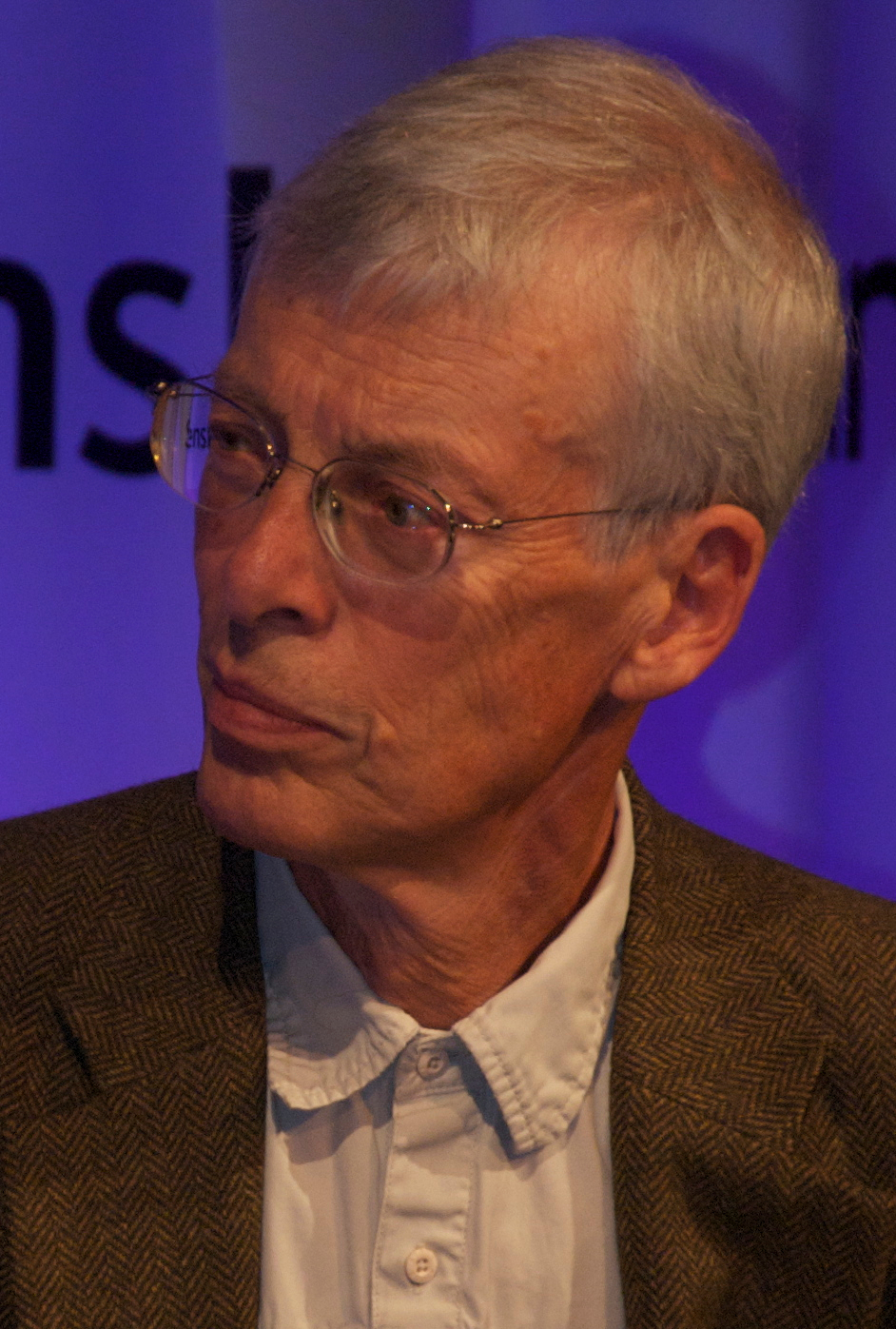
- Jesper Svenbro in 2011.
- Born: Bengt Åke Jesper Svenbro; 10 March 1944 (age 82); Landskrona, Sweden
- Education: Lund University
- Writing career
- Language: Swedish

Member of the Swedish Academy (Seat No. 8)
- Incumbent
- Assumed office 20 December 2006
- Preceded by: Östen Sjöstrand

Jesper Svenbro (born 10 March 1944) is a Swedish poet, classical philologist, and member of the Swedish Academy.

== Biography ==
Svenbro was born in Landskrona, Scania, Sweden. He was educated at Lund University, where he was awarded a Ph.D. in 1976 for his dissertation La parole et le marbre: aux origines de la poétique grecque, on the origin of ancient Greek poetics. Other works include Phrasikleia: anthropologie de la lecture en Grèce ancienne (1988). He is director of research at Centre Louis Gernet (CRCSA) in Paris. In 2006, he was elected a member of the Swedish Academy, succeeding the poet Östen Sjöstrand in seat 8.

His poetry has been translated into English by the Swedish critic Lars-Håkan Svensson and the American poet John Matthias, and appearing, among other venues, in the journal Samizdat and the volume The Three-Toed Gull: Selected Poems, published by Northwestern University Press. In 2010, Svenbro was awarded the Illis quorum in the eighth size by the Swedish government.

== Bibliography ==
- Det är idag det sker (1966)
- La parole et le marbre : aux origines de la poétique grecque (1976)
- Element till en kosmologi och andra dikter (1979)
- Särimner (1984)
- Phrasikleia : anthropologie de la lecture en Grèce ancienne (1988)
- Les savoirs de l’écriture : en Grèce ancienne (1988)
- Hermes kofösaren (1991)
- Storia della lettura nella Grecia antica (1991)
- Samisk Apollon och andra dikter
- Blått (1994)
- Vid budet att Santo Bambino di Aracœli slutligen stulits av maffian (1996)
- Myrstigar : figurer för skrift och läsning i antikens Grekland (1999)
- Lepidopterology (1999)
- Installation med miniatyrflagga (1999)
- Pastorn min far (2001)
- Fjärilslära : antika, barocka och samtida figurer för det skrivna ordet och läsandet (2002)
- Graven och lyran : ett grekiskt tema i Esaias Tegnérs poesi (2002)
- Himlen och andra upptäckter (2005)
- Östen Sjöstrand : inträdestal i Svenska akademien (2006)
- Försokratikern Sapfo och andra studier i antikt tänkande (2007)
- Vingårdsmannen och hans söner (2008)
- Inget andetag är det andra likt (2011)
- Ivar Harrie : minnesteckning (2011)
- Echo an Sappho : Sapho-Fragmente = Sapfo fragmenter (2011)
- Krigsroman (2013)
- Hill, Hill, Hill (2014)
- Ekeby trafikförening (2015)
- Sapfo har lämnat oss : sapfostudier från sex årtionden (2015)

Cultural offices
Preceded by Östen Sjöstrand	Swedish Academy, Seat No.8; 2006–	Succeeded by incumbent
