= Bruno K. Öijer =

Swedish poet

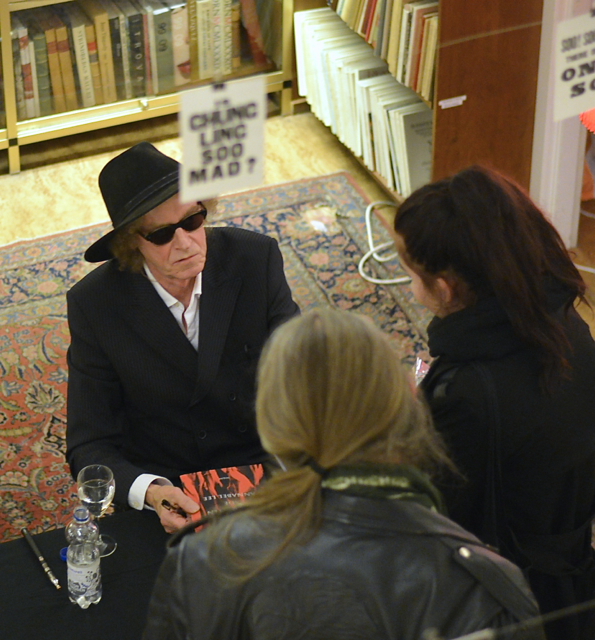
- Öijer signs his poetry collection at an antiquarian in Stockholm
- Born: Kenneth Bruno Öijer; 26 November 1951 (age 74); Linköping, Sweden
- Occupation: Poet
- Spouse: Maya Eizin Öijer
- Writing career
- Period: 1973–
- Genre: Poetry
- Notable works: Giljotin; Medan giftet verkar Det förlorade ordet Dimman av allt
- Notable awards: Carl Emil Englund-priset 1991; De Nios Vinterpris 1995; Bellmanpriset 1999; Sveriges Radios Lyrikpris 1999; De Nios stora pris 2002; Erik Lindegren-priset 2002

Bruno Keats Öijer (born 26 November 1951 in Linköping, Sweden) is a contemporary Swedish poet.

== Biography ==
Öijer was born in Linköping in 1951. His first collection of poems, Sång för anarkismen (lit. Song for Anarchism) was published in 1973.

Öijer is perhaps most appreciated as a stage performance poet, and he has made notable appearances in front of large audiences. During the 1970s, he was a part of poetry group Vesuvius.

In 1986, Öijer, along with Bryn Settels, released the LP Shade Coming. He has on several occasions collaborated with the Pork Quartet, which played with him, among other things, when performing "Sketches for one of the speeches of death" on television. On 6 June 2003, he performed in conjunction with the group Kent's concert at Stockholm Stadium. Öijer's poems have also been set to music by several Swedish composers. These include Molly Kien, Håkan Larsson, Martin B Svensson, Tomas Winter, Hans Ek, Henrik Strindberg, Ylva Skog, Joakim Sandgren and Kim Hedås.

One of his appearances was that in Stockholm on 6 June 2003, on the occasion of the national day concert by Kent.

In 2025, Öijer was awarded the DN Culture Prize for his poetry

== Bibliography ==
- Sång för anarkismen (lit. Song for Anarchism, poetry collection, 1973)
- Fotografier av undergångens leende (lit. Photographs of the Smile of Destruction, poetry collection, 1974)
- c/o Night (poetry collection, 1976)
- Chivas Regal (novel, 1978)
- Spelarens sten (lit. The Gambler's Stone, poetry collection, 1979)
- Giljotin (lit. Guillotine, poetry collection, 1981)
- Medan giftet verkar (lit. While the Poison Takes Effect, poetry collection, 1990)
- Det förlorade ordet (lit. The Lost Word, poetry collection, 1995)
- Dimman av allt (lit. The Mist of It All, poetry collection, 2001)
- Svart som silver (lit. Black as Silver, poetry collection, 2008)
- Och natten viskade Annabel Lee (lit. And the Night Whispered Annabel Lee, poetry collection, 2014)
