= Gunnar D. Hansson =

Swedish writer and translator

- Born: 1945 (age 80–81) Smögen, Sweden
- Occupation: associate professor of literature at University of Gothenburg, academic, author, poet, essayist, translator
- Genres: Prose, translation, poetry

Gunnar D. Hansson (born 1945 on the island Smögen in Sweden) is an author, poet, essayist, translator and associate professor of literature at University of Gothenburg. He is an acclaimed translator of several works, including Old English poetry.

== Bibliography ==
- Övergångar 1979
- De dödas traditioner 1980
- Avbilder 1982
- Otid 1985
- Nådens oordning 1988 (dissertation)
- Martin Koch 1988
- Olunn 1989
- Lunnebok 1991
- Idegransöarna 1994
- AB Neandertal 1996
- Ärans hospital 1999
- Förlusten av Norge 2000
- Senecaprogrammet 2004
- Lyckans berså 2008
- Lomonosovryggen 2009

== Awards ==
- Göteborgs-Postens litteraturpris 1994
- De Nios Vinterpris 1994
- Lars Ahlin-stipendiet 1998
- Sveriges Radios Lyrikpris 2000
- Bellmanpriset 2004
- Tegnérpriset 2006
