= Ebba Witt-Brattström =

Swedish author and professor of literature

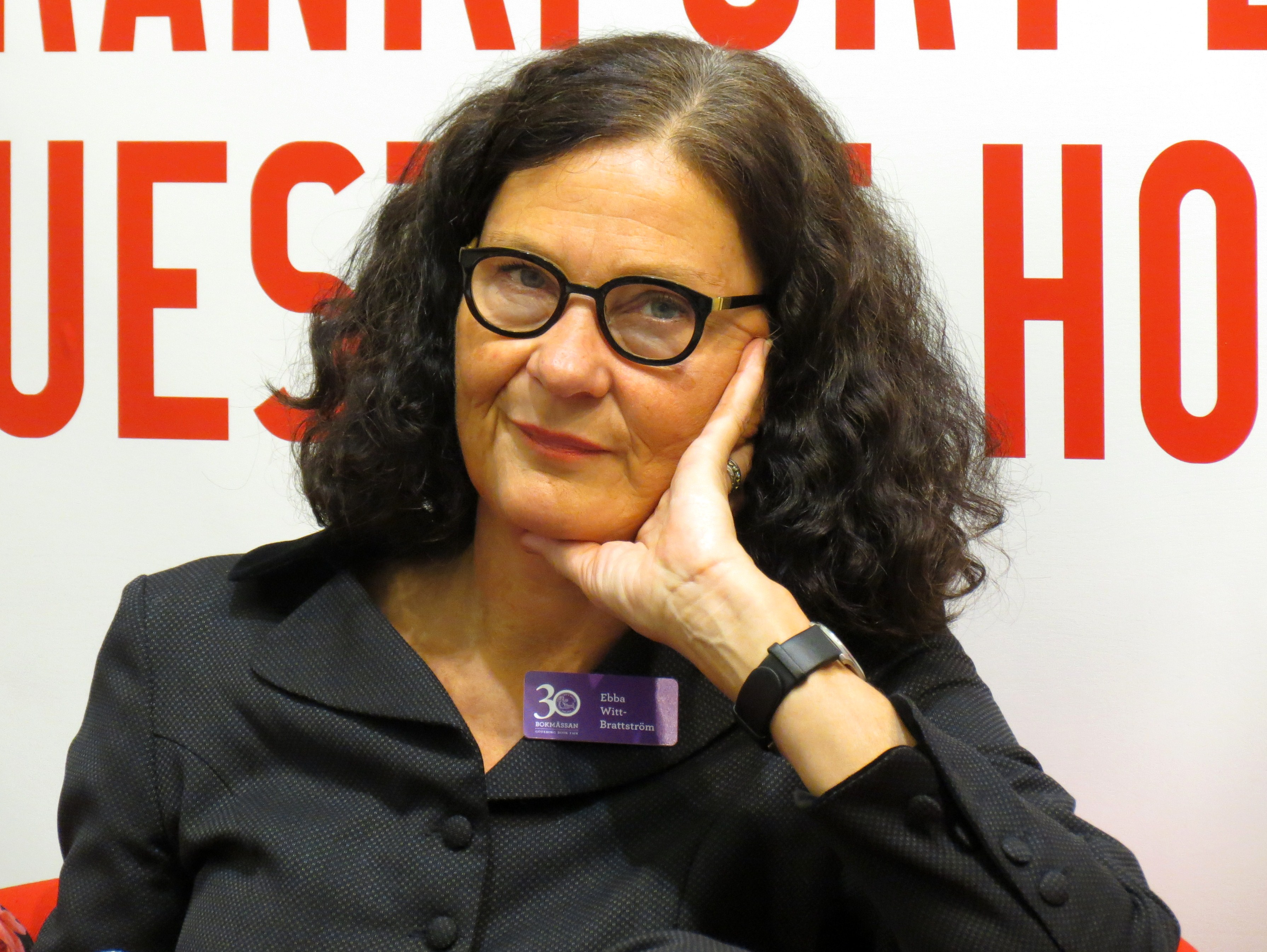
- Ebba Witt-Brattström at the 2014 Gothenburg Book Fair.
- Born: 1 June 1953 (age 71); Stockholm, Sweden
- Occupation(s): Professor of Nordic Literature, Helsinki University
- Spouse(s): Horace Engdahl (1989–2014); Ola Holmgren (1977–1982)

Ebba Witt-Brattström (Swedish pronunciation: [ˈɛ̂bːa ˈvɪtː ˈbrâtːstrœm]; born 1 June 1953) is a Swedish scholar in comparative literature. She is Professor of Literature and head of department at Södertörn University outside Stockholm, and a well-known feminist.

Witt-Brattström completed her PhD with a dissertation on the Swedish author Moa Martinson (Moa Martinson: skrift och drift i trettiotalet) at Stockholm University in 1988. She has since written a number of texts on St. Bridget of Sweden, Victoria Benedictsson and Edith Södergran (among others). She also translated the novel Egalia's Daughters by Gerd Brantenberg into Swedish. In 2010 she published a history of the feminist movement in Sweden, 'Å alla kära systrar (For all dear sisters).

Witt-Brattström was the Dag Hammarskjöld Visiting Professor at the Department for Northern European Studies at the Humboldt University of Berlin from 2008. From 2012 she is Professor of Nordic Literature at Helsinki University.

In the 1970s she was a member of the feminist organisation Grupp 8, and in 2005 she was one of the founders of the feminist political organisation and party Feministiskt Initiativ, although she later distanced herself from the organisation and criticized what she saw as its strong left-wing tendencies.

Between 1989 and 2014 Ebba Witt-Brattström was married to Horace Engdahl, permanent secretary of the Swedish Academy. They have three sons. She also has an older son from an earlier marriage.

Both her parents came to Sweden as refugees during the Second World War. Her father was a German anti-Nazi from a relatively affluent family, while her mother was an Estonian from a poor peasant's family. Her parents divorced early, and she grew up with her mother.

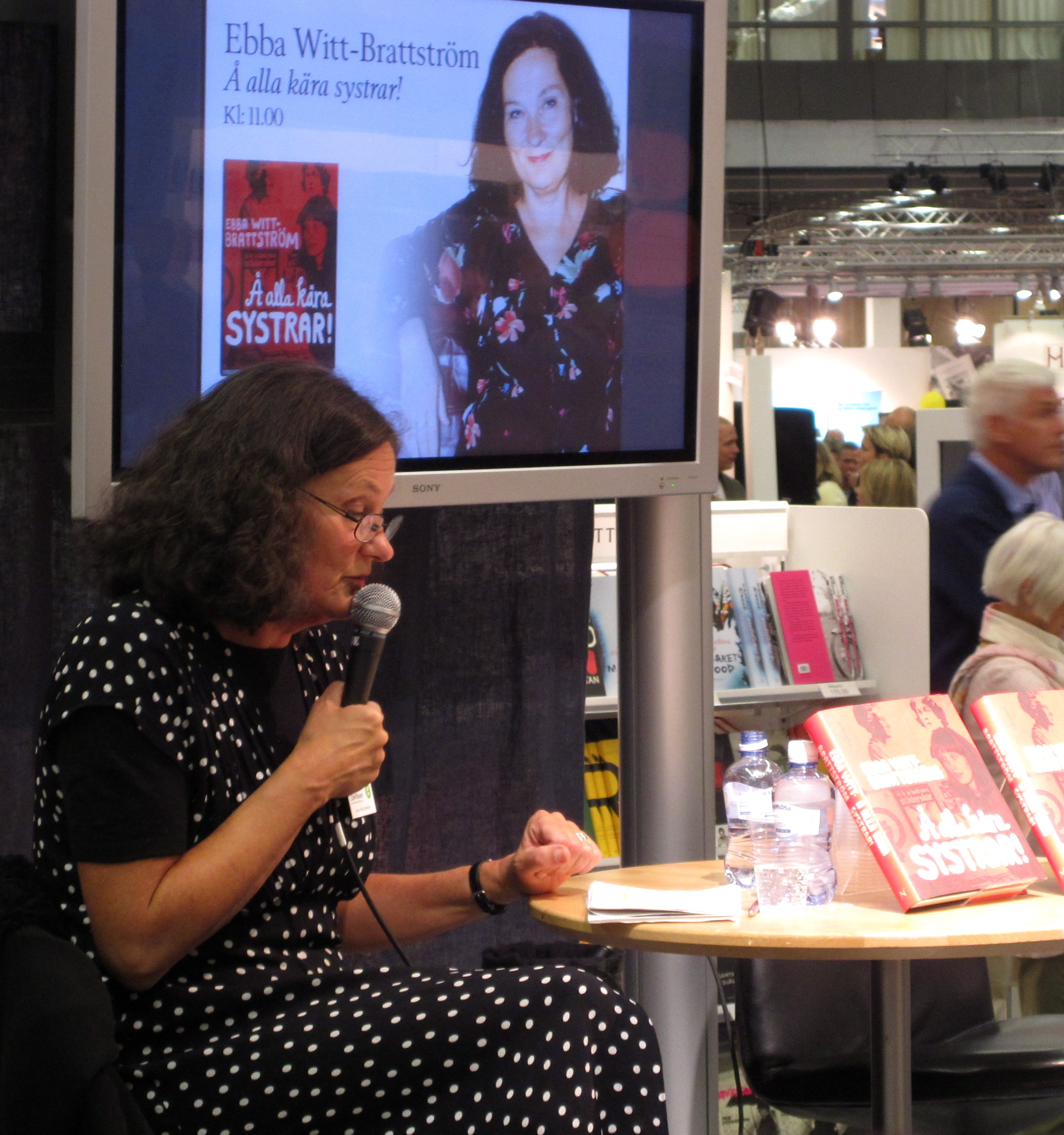
Ebba Witt-Brattström (born 1953), Swedish professor of literature.
