= Samizdat (poetry magazine) =

Poetry magazine in Chicago

Samizdat was an international poetry magazine published in Chicago from 1998 until 2004 and edited by the poet Robert Archambeau. It was noted for its unusual format, being printed on large newsprint pages. Contributors included Adam Zagajewski as well as Clayton Eshleman, Pierre Joris, Jerome Rothenberg, Michael Heller, Stephen Collis, C.S. Giscombe, and others associated with experimental poetry. Eclectic and xenophilic in nature, the journal published work on or by Irish experimental poets, Eritrean poets, and new translations of poetry by Pablo Picasso and Paul Celan.

Special issues were devoted to Scandinavian poetry, the work of John Matthias, and the collaboration between Joris and Rothenberg.

The journal was named after the Russian underground literary movement. The Russian word "samizdat" translates literally as "self-published"; the word was chosen to reflect the journal's refusal of institutional funding.
