= Sven-Eric Liedman =

Swedish historian of ideas (born 1939)

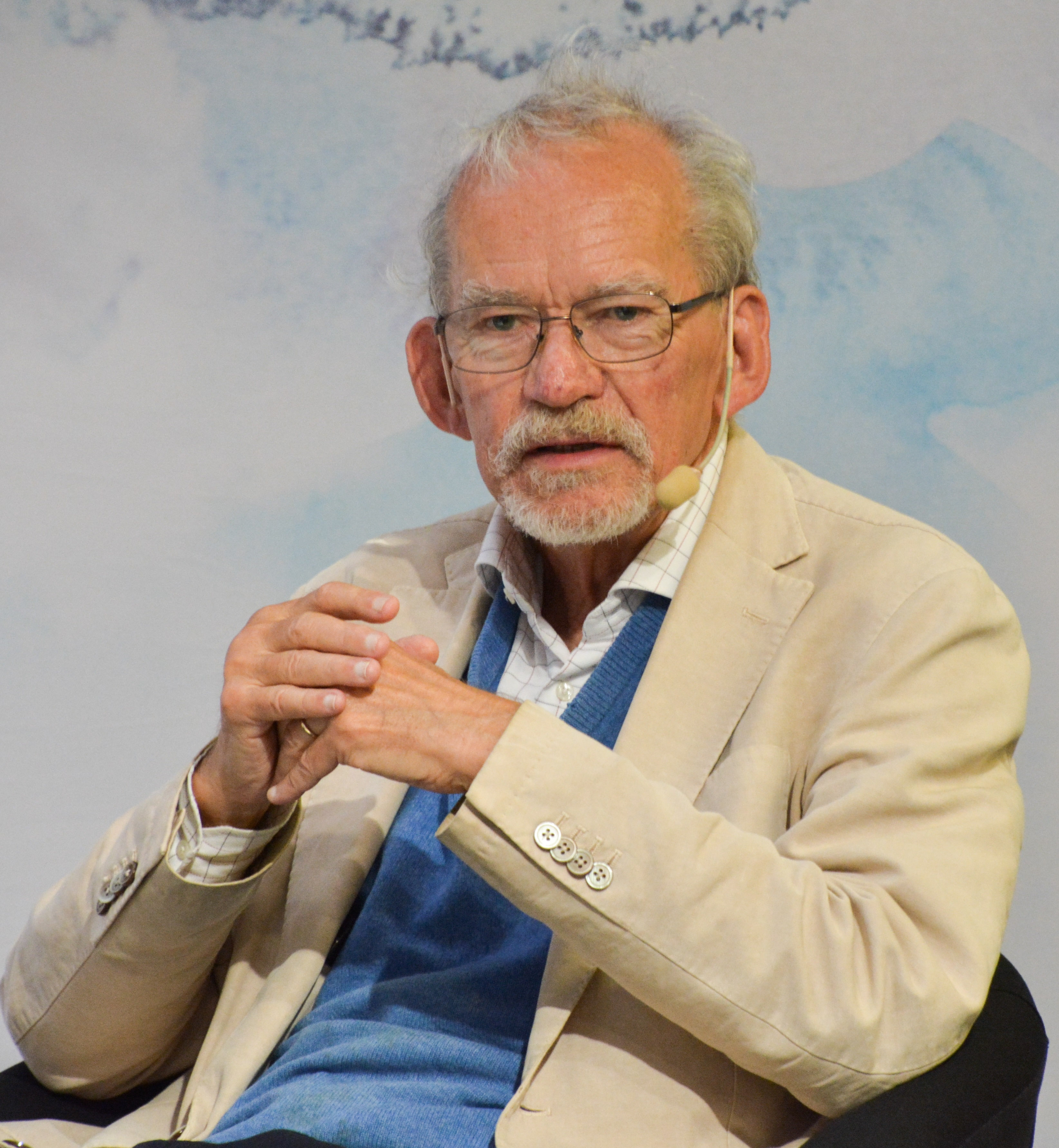
- Sven-Eric Liedman in September 2015
- Born: 1939 (age 86–87); Karlskrona, Sweden

Academic background
- Education: University of Gothenburg; Lund University

Academic work
- Discipline: Philosophy
- Institutions: University of Gothenburg
- Main interests: History of ideas

Sven-Eric Liedman (born 1939) is a Swedish author and Professor Emeritus of history of ideas at the University of Gothenburg in Gothenburg, Sweden.

He was born in 1939 in Karlskrona. He was raised in Vittskövle and Degeberga.

Liedman received his Bachelor of Arts degree in theoretical philosophy at Lund University in 1959. In 1961 he received a Licentiate of Philosophy degree in the same subject. His most important teacher in Lund was Gunnar Aspelin. He then moved to the University of Gothenburg, where he received his Ph.D. in history of ideas in 1966.

From 1966 to 1968, he worked as a journalist and deputy culture editor at Sydsvenskan. In 1968 he held a temporary position at Lund University. In 1979 he was appointed Professor of history of ideas at the University of Gothenburg, where he remained until his retirement in 2006.

Sven-Eric Liedman is the author of a well-known Swedish textbook on the history of political ideas, with the prefix "Från Platon till..." in its title. The textbook has since its first edition in 1972 been updated many times. The title has also changed to reflect the changes. The first edition was called "Från Platon till Lenin" (from Plato to Lenin). The last edition is called "Från Platon till demokratins kris" (from Plato to democracy's crisis).

In 1987–1988, Liedman was a Fellow at the Swedish Collegium for Advanced Study in Uppsala, Sweden.

== Awards ==
- August Prize, 1997.
- Kellgren Prize, 2002.
- Wettergrens bokollon, 2004.
- Lotten von Kræmer Prize from Samfundet De Nio, 2005.
- Swedish Academy Nordic Prize, 2008.
