= August Bernhard Andersson =

Swedish poet

August Bernhard Andersson (1877–1961) was a poet from Barva, Sweden. He became famous more than fifty years after his death, when his poems were released posthumously. The subjects of his poetry encompass nature, creation, the working man and religious themes (such as hymns and prayers).

== Publications available in English ==
- Evanescent Memories (collection)
