= Tua Forsström =

Finnish writer

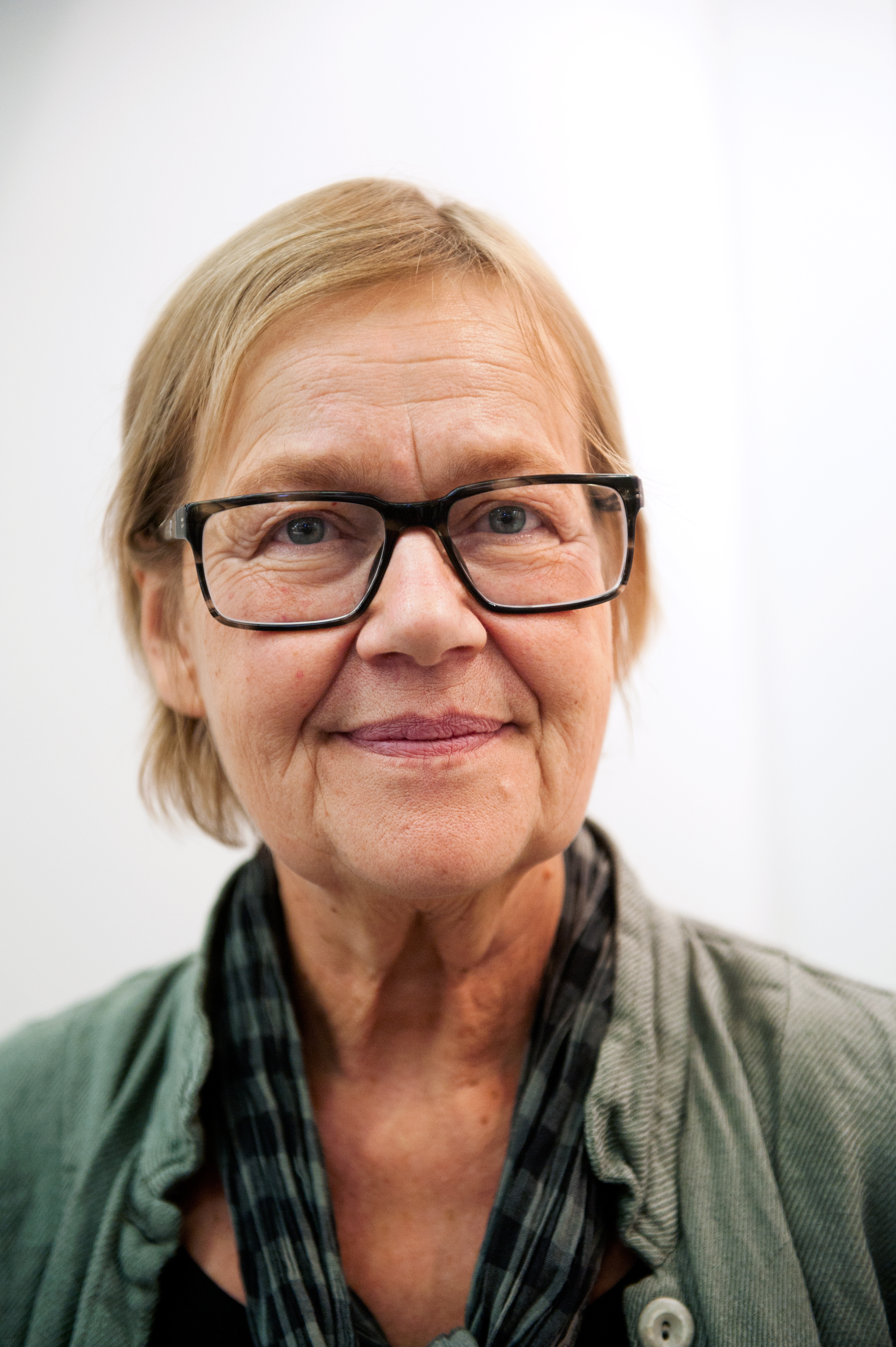
- Forsström in 2011
- Born: Tua Birgitta Forsström; 2 April 1947 (age 79); Porvoo, Finland
- Writing career
- Language: Swedish
- Notable work: After Having Spent a Night Among Horses (1997)

Member of the Swedish Academy (Seat No. 18)
- In office 20 December 2019 – 20 December 2024
- Preceded by: Katarina Frostenson

Tua Birgitta Forsström (born 2 April 1947) is a Finland-Swedish writer who writes in Swedish. She was awarded the Nordic Council Literature Prize in 1998 for the poetry collection Efter att ha tillbringat en natt bland hästar. Forsström's work is known for its engagement with the Finnish landscape, travel and conflicts within relationships. She often uses quotations in her work, sometimes placing them directly into her poems and at other times using them as introductions or interludes in her sequences. She has used quotations from Egon Friedell, Ludwig Wittgenstein, Hermann Hesse and Friedrich Nietzsche. In the collection After Spending a Night Among Horses (Efter att ha tillbringat en natt bland hästar) (1997) Forsström uses quotations from the Andrei Tarkovsky film Stalker, they are placed as interludes in a sequence of pieces and sit alone on the page, without direct reference to their source on the page, leaving this to a Notes & Quotations section at the end of the book.

Forsström is the daughter of insurance clerk Äke Osvald Forsström and primary school teacher Eila Emilia Lindroos. She graduated from Ekenäs samlyceum in 1966 and earned a Bachelor of Arts from the University of Helsinki in 1972. She undertook a study trip to the United States from 1964 to 1965. Starting in 1973, Forsström worked as a publishing editor at Söderström & Co. She has served on the board of the Society of Swedish Authors in Finland since 1975 and on the board of the Author's Center since 1980.

She published her first book in 1972, A Poem about Love and Other Things (En dikt om kärlek och annat). Her breakthrough into the English-speaking world came in 1987 with her sixth collection, Snow Leopard (Snöleopard), which was translated into the English by David McDuff and published by Bloodaxe Books. In 1990, the book won a Poetry Book Society Translation Award in the United Kingdom. In 2006, I Studied Once at a Wonderful Faculty was published by Bloodaxe Books, with translations from David McDuff and Stina Katchadourian. The collection contains Snow Leopard (Snöleopard) (1987), The Parks (Parkerna) (1992), After Spending a Night Among Horses (Efter att ha tillbringat en natt bland hästar) (1997) and a new poem sequence called Minerals.

On 7 February 2019, Forsström was elected a member of the Swedish Academy, succeeding Katarina Frostenson in seat 18. She was inducted on 20 December 2019 and resigned five years later, on 20 December 2024.

== Bibliography ==
- A Poem About Love and Other Things (En dikt om kärlek och annat) (1972, Söderström & Co., Porvoo)
- Where the Notes End (Där anteckningarna slutar) (1974, Söderström & Co., Porvoo)
- Actually We are Very Happy (Egentligen är vi mycket lyckliga) (1976, Söderström & Co., Porvoo)
- Yellow bird's-nest (Tallört) (1979, Söderström & Co., Porvoo)
- September (1983, Söderström & Co., Porvoo)
- Snow Leopard (Snöleopard) (1987)
- The Mariana Trench (Marianergraven) (1990)
- The Parks (Parkerna) (1992)
- After Having Spent a Night Among Horses (Efter att ha tillbringat en natt bland hästar) (1997)
- I Studied Once at a Wonderful Faculty (Jag studerade en gång vid en underbar fakultet) (2003)

=== Other works ===
- Diktonius (1974) (with Claes Andersson)
- Våra gossar på Cypern by Robert Alftan (1975) (co-translator, with Mauritz Nylund and the author)
- På erä platser... färdiga... (1980) (with Claes Andersson and Johan Bargum)
- Maailma, katettu pöytä (Maailma, katettu pöytä; 'The World, a Set Table') (1983) (co-selector with Märta Tikkanen of Finland-Swedish poems for an anthology of Finnish women poets edited by Mirjam Polkunen and Auli Viikari)

== Awards ==
- Längmannin Prize 1973
- Swedish Literature Society in Finland Prize 1977, 1980
- State Prize for Literature 1980
- Nordic Council's Literature Prize 1998

Cultural offices
Preceded by Katarina Frostenson	Swedish Academy, Seat No.18; 2019–	Succeeded by incumbent
