= Monica Braw =

Swedish writer

- Born: May 24, 1945 (age 80); Härnösand
- Occupations: author, international reporter

Monica Braw (born 24 May 1945 in Härnösand), is a Swedish author and an international reporter.

== Bibliography ==
=== Fiction ===
- Någonannanstans (Somewhere Else)(short stories) Bonniers 1978
- Innan jag dog (Before I Died) (novel). Bonniers 1980
- Överlevarna (The Survivors) (novel). Bonniers 1982 (pocket Bonniers 1985. In German Wir sind * * die Angst der Welt. Fischer Taschenbuch Verlag Frankfurt am Main 1984)
- Hjärtlandet (Heartland) (short stories) Bonniers 1984
- Hemort:Tokyo (Domicile: Tokyo) (tales) Bonniers 1988
- Främling. En svensk i fjärran land (Stranger. A Swede in far-off land) (novel) Bonniers 2002
- Hiroshima överlever (Hiroshima Survives) (novel, revis. Överlevarna) Orienta 2005

=== Fact ===
- Jorden är vårt hem.
- Edita Morris och hennes tid (Gidlunds 2018)
- Kuolla kuin kärpäset (Die like flies). Rapport från Bangladesh. Report from Bangladesh. With Juhani Lompolo. Otava, Helsingfors 1971
- Kvinna i Kina. LT 1973. (In Finnish Neljä vuorta - naisen asema uudessa Kiinassa. Tammi 1973.) (Woman in China)
- Den gömda solen. En bok om Japan och japanska kvinnor. With Hiroe Gunnarsson. LT 1978. (In German Frauen in Japan. Zwischen Tradition und Aufbruch. Fischer Taschenbuchverlag. Frankfurt am Main 1982) (The Hidden Sun. About Japan and Japanese women)
- Pitkä matka itään (Den långa resan österut) (The Long Journey East) With Juhani Lompolo. Kirjayhtymä Helsingfors 1985
- The Atomic Bomb Suppressed. American Censorship in Japan 1945–1949. (Dissertation in History at the University of Lund). Liber 1986 (Den censurerade atombomben. Brevskolan och TBV 1985 förkortad version. In Japanese Ken’etsu. Kinji sareta genbaku hodo. Jiji Tsushinsha Tokyo 1988 . Revised as The Atomic Bomb Suppressed. American Censorship in Occupied Japan. M.E.Sharpe Armonk N.Y. USA 1991
- Fakta om Japan. Bredvidläsningsbok för mellanstadiet. (Facts about Japan. 4-7 grade school book) Almqvist & Wiksell Läromedel 1991
- Japanska tecken i tiden. (Japanese Signs of the Times - Japanese ways of writing) Folkens museum Etnografiska (The National Ethnographic Museum) 1994
- Trendbrott i japansk politik. (Break of Trends in Japanese Politics) Utrikespolitiska Institutet (Swedish Institute of Foreign Policy) 1994
- Japan. Bredvidläsningsbok för högstadiet. (Schoolbook for 8-12 grade) Natur & Kultur 1996
- Japanskt ABC. Orientens mystik i dagsljus. (Japanese ABC) With Juhani Lompolo. Orienta 1997
- Jättens rötter. Japan - sömnigt samurajvälde blir ekonomisk supermakt. (The Roots of the Giant. From Sleepy Samurai Nation to Economic Superpower) With Aimé Humbert. Orienta 1999
- Från Hokusai till Dragon Ball (From Hokusai to Dragon Ball) Carlson förlag 2004.
- Samurajerna (The Samurai) With Juhani Lompolo. Atlantis förlag 2006a
- Trollsländans land – Japans historia (Land of the Dragonfly – History of Japan), Atlantis 2010, ISBN 91-7353-370-X
