= Lars Forssell =

Swedish writer (1928–2007)

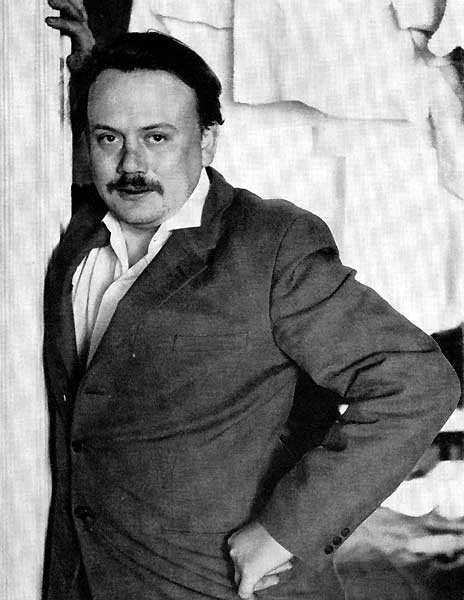
- Genre: poetry; lyrics; journalism; drama
- Notable awards: Bellman Prize

Lars Hans Carl Abraham Forssell (14 January 1928 – 26 July 2007) was a Swedish writer and member of the Swedish Academy. Forssell was a versatile writer who worked within many genres, including poetry, drama and songwriting. He was awarded the Bellman Prize in both 1968 and 1981

== Early life ==
Lars Forssell was born in Stockholm, Sweden, in 1928. He attended a local elementary school called Kungsholms Folkskola, which, at the beginning of the twentieth century, was the world's largest elementary school - the school had a capacity of 3,800 pupils, but since not all of them attended school every day, they were taught in shifts and according to the City Museum of Stockholm, the total number of enrolled pupils was over 6,000.

He studied in the United States during the 1940s, returned to Sweden to study for a degree at the University of Uppsala in 1952.

== Career ==
While in attending the University of Uppsala, he became a cultural reporter for various Swedish newspapers and journals (Utsikt, Bonniers Litterära Magasin, Poesi, Dagens Nyheter and Expressen). At the same time, he became established as a lyricist for cabaret shows and his own reviews (including Två åsnor (A Pair of Donkeys) which was staged in Gothenburg in 1957). In 1966 he was a member of the jury at the 16th Berlin International Film Festival. During the late 1960s he was among the contributors of a satirical magazine, Puss, in Stockholm.

His collections of poetry won him membership of the Swedish Academy in 1971, while his song lyrics brought him widespread public recognition. During the 1970s he worked tirelessly as a poet and as a song-contest lyricist, including writing for the 1973 Swedish Eurovision Song Contest entry selection round (Melodifestivalen) and for performer Lill-Babs in 1980.

He was awarded the Bellman Prize in both 1968 and 1981, the Pilot Prize in 1992, the Litteris et Artibus award in 1993, the Cornelis Vreeswijk scholarship in 1997 and the Swedish Academy's Nordic Prize in 1998. His works include anthologies of poetry, books of song lyrics, children's books, plays, operatic librettos and translations.

== Personal life ==
He was married in 1951 to Kerstin Hane, and was the father of Jonas and Malte Forssell. Forssell died in Stockholm in 2007.

Cultural offices
Preceded by Sigfrid Siwertz	Swedish Academy, Seat No.4; 1971–2007	Succeeded by Anders Olsson
