= Anders Olsson (writer) =

Swedish writer

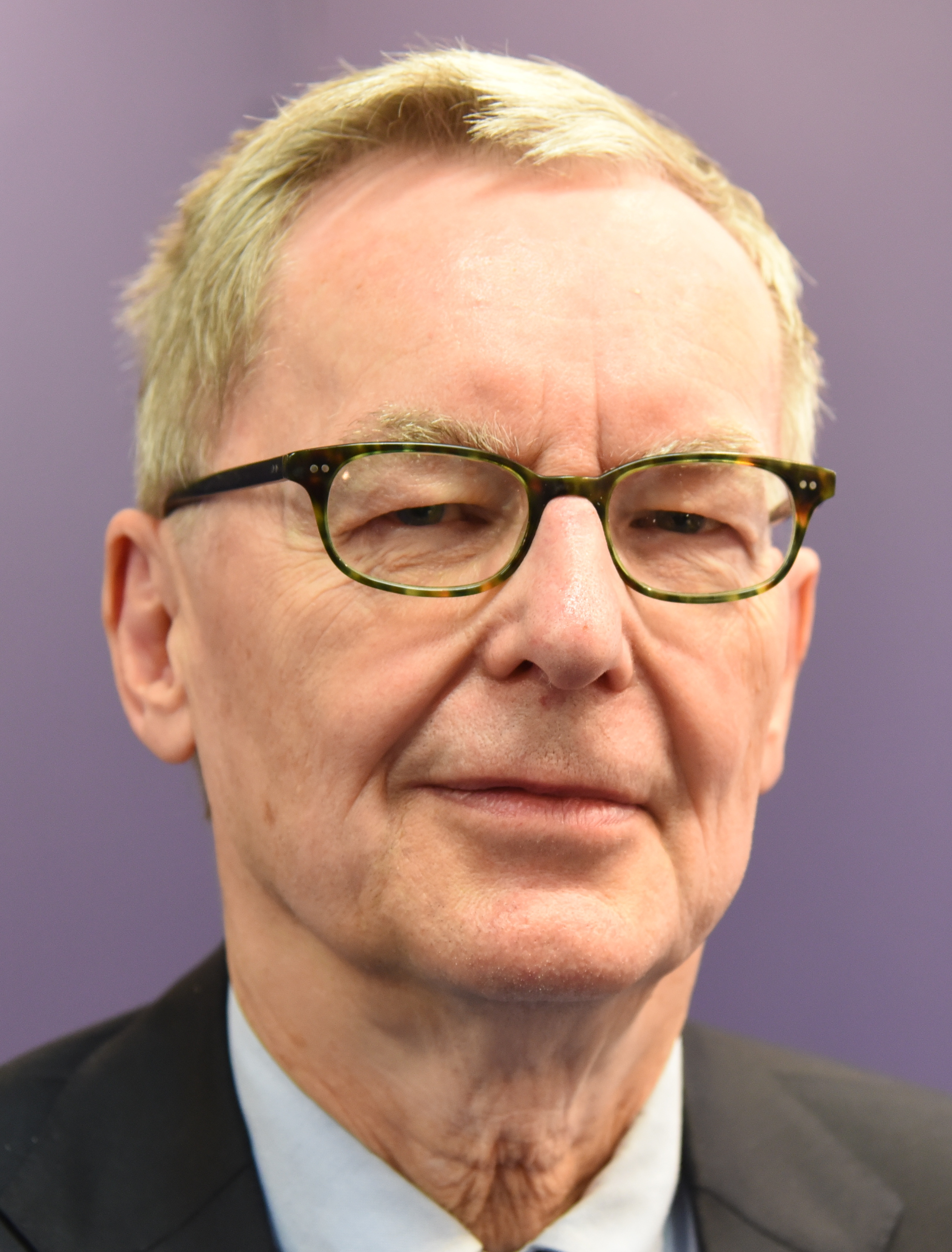
- Born: 19 June 1949 (age 76); Stockholm, Sweden
- Occupation: literary critic

Member of the Swedish Academy (Seat No. 4)
- Incumbent
- Assumed office 20 December 2008
- Preceded by: Lars Forssell

Permanent Secretary of the Swedish Academy (pro temporare)
- In office April 2018 – June 2019
- Preceded by: Sara Danius
- Succeeded by: Mats Malm

Anders Olsson (born 19 June 1949) is a Swedish writer, professor of literature at Stockholm University, literary critic and member of the Swedish Academy.

Olsson has written some 15 books on poetry and the history of literature; together with his friend and ally Horace Engdahl he was a key introducer of the work of Jacques Derrida and other post-structuralist thinkers into Swedish literary research and criticism. His doctoral dissertation on Swedish poet and essayist Gunnar Ekelöf was published in 1983 and met with mostly favourable reviews. He was appointed professor of literature at Stockholm University in 2004 and his research interests include the development of modern literature.

Olsson was member of the Kris editorial staff. In 1984 he published his first collection of poems, Dagar, aska.

In February 2008, Olson was elected a member of the Swedish Academy, by secret ballot to succeed poet and writer Lars Forssell who died in 2007, and he formally took his seat in the 18-member assembly on 20 December 2008.

From 13 April 2018 he served as the pro tempore permanent secretary of the Academy, following a controversy when Sara Danius was forced to resign. Anders Olsson then served as the permanent secretary of the Academy between 1 June 2018 and 1 June 2019. He is currently the chairman of the Academy's Nobel Committee for Literature.

== Bibliography ==
- Mälden mellan stenarna (1981)
- Ekelöfs nej (1983) (doctoral dissertation)
- Intertextualitet (1984)
- Dagar, aska (1984)
- De antända polerna (1986)
- Den okända texten : en essä om tolkningsteori från kyrkofäderna till Derrida (1987)
- Bellerofontes resa (1988)
- Solstämma (1991)
- Den Andra Födan (1992)
- Det vita (1993)
- Ekelunds hunger (1995)
- Att skriva dagen : Gunnar Björlings poetiska värld (1995)
- Gunnar Ekelöf (1997)
- Ett mått av lycka (1998)
- Läsningar av intet (2000)
- Skillnadens konst : sex kapitel om moderna fragment (2006)
- Lars Forssell : inträdestal i Svenska akademien (2008)
- Men så oändligt lätt att svara dig (2010)
- Ordens asyl : inledning till den moderna exillitteraturen (2011)
- Vad är en suck? : en essä om Erik Johan Stagnelius (2013)
- Languages of Exile – Migration and Multilingualism in Twentieth-Century Literature (2013)
- Tankar om läsning (2015)

== Notes ==
Cultural offices
Preceded by Lars Forssell	Swedish Academy, Seat No.4; 2008–	Succeeded by incumbent
