= Horace Engdahl =

Swedish literary historian, Permanent secretary of the Swedish Academy

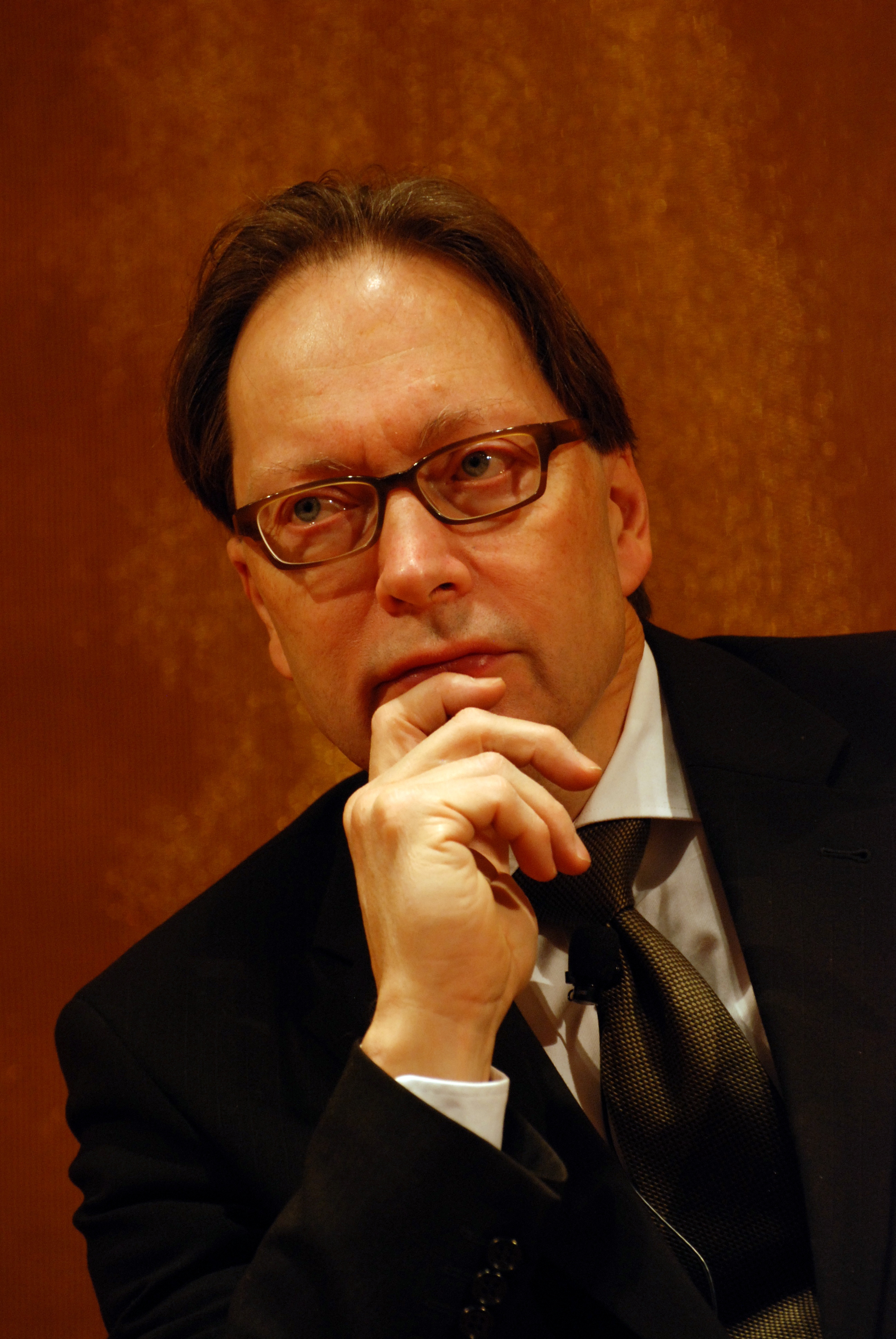
- Horace Engdahl in 2008
- Born: 30 December 1948 (age 77); Karlskrona, Sweden
- Education: Stockholm University; University of Aarhus
- Occupation: Professor of Scandinavian Literature
- Spouse: Ebba Witt-Brattström (1989–2014)

Member of the Swedish Academy (Seat No. 17)
- Incumbent
- Assumed office 20 December 1997
- Preceded by: Johannes Edfelt

Permanent Secretary of the Swedish Academy
- In office June 1999 – June 2009
- Preceded by: Sture Allén
- Succeeded by: Peter Englund

Horace Oscar Axel Engdahl (born 30 December 1948) is a Swedish literary historian and critic, and has been a member of the Swedish Academy since 1997. He was the permanent secretary of the Swedish Academy from 1999 to June 2009, when he was succeeded by Swedish author and historian Peter Englund.

== Biography ==
Engdahl was born in Karlskrona, Blekinge, Sweden. He earned his B.A. in 1970 at Stockholm University; he earned his doctoral degree (PhD) in 1987, with a study on Swedish romanticism, but had meanwhile been active as a literary critic, translator and journal editor, and was one of the introducers of the continental tradition of literary scholarship in Sweden. He is adjunct professor of Scandinavian Literature at the University of Aarhus in Denmark. He speaks Swedish, English, German, French and Russian fluently.

Engdahl was member of the Kris editorial staff.

On 16 October 1997, Engdahl became a member of the Swedish Academy, elected to seat number 17 vacated by the death of Johannes Edfelt; on 1 June 1999, he succeeded Sture Allén as the Academy's permanent secretary, i.e. its executive member and spokesperson. As such, he had the annual task of announcing the recipient of the Nobel Prize in Literature to the public. On 20 December 2008 it was announced that after ten years Engdahl would step down as the Academy's permanent secretary on 1 June 2009.

Between 1989 and 2014 he was married to Ebba Witt-Brattström, professor of literature at Södertörn University outside Stockholm. They have three sons.

== Controversy ==
In October 2008, Engdahl told the Associated Press that the United States is "too isolated, too insular" to challenge Europe as "the center of the literary world" and that "they don't translate enough and don't really participate in the big dialogue of literature ...That ignorance is restraining." At the time of the interview, no American author had received a Nobel Prize in Literature since 1993. His comments generated controversy across the Atlantic, with Harold Augenbraum, head of the U.S. National Book Foundation offering to send him a reading list.

In April 2018, the New York Times reported that Engdahl had railed against former Academy members who left following allegations of sexual abuse by Jean-Claude Arnault.

== Bibliography ==
- Om det utopiska tänkesättet : föreläsning i Stockholm (1982)
- Swedish ballet and dance : a contemporary view (1984)
- Den romantiska texten : en essä i nio avsnitt (1986)
- Om uppmärksamheten (1988)
- Stilen och lyckan : essäer om litteratur (1992)
- Beröringens ABC : en essä om rösten i litteraturen (1994)
- Stagnelius Kärleken (1996)
- Meteorer (1999)
- Ärret efter drömmen (2009)
- Cigaretten efteråt (2011)
- Den sista grisen (2016)
- Nattens mänsklighet (2019)
- De obekymrade (2019)
