= Östen Sjöstrand =

Swedish poet, writer and translator (1925–2006)

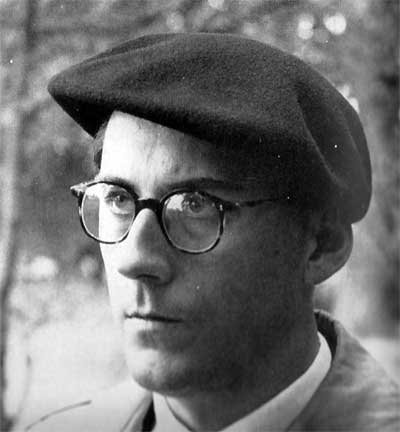
Östen Sjöstrand.

Östen Sjöstrand (16 June 1925 in Gothenburg – 13 May 2006) was a Swedish poet, writer and translator. He became a member of the Swedish Academy in 1975 and was a member of the Academy's Nobel committee between 1979 and 1990.

== Biography ==
Östen Sjöstrand gave his introductory speech in the Swedish Academy about the Swedish writer Pär Lagerkvist, who preceded him at the same chair. As a poet he debuted in 1949 with Unio, which was marked by the post-war agony of the Swedish 1940s poetry. He was above all inspired of French poetry. Music was another source of inspiration for Östen Sjöstrand. In cooperation with Sven-Erik Bäck he wrote a pair of operas, including Gästabudet.

== Bibliography ==
- Unio (1949)
- Invigelse (1950)
- Återvändo (1953)
- Ande och verklighet (1954)
- Dikter mellan midnatt och gryning (1954)
- Främmande mörker, främmande ljus (1955)
- Dikter 1949–1955 (1958)
- Hemlöshet och hem (1958)
- Världen skapas varje dag (1960)
- De gåtfulla hindren och andra dikter (1961)
- En vinter i Norden (1963)
- I vattumannens tecken (1967)
- Ensamma stjärnor, en gemensam horisont (1970)
- Drömmen är ingen fasad (1971)
- Fantasins nödvändighet (1971)
- Pär Lagerkvist (1975)
- Strömöverföring (1977) ISBN 91-0-040387-3
- Dikter (1981)
- Strax ovanför vattenlinjen (1984) ISBN 9100461784
- På återvägen från Jasna Góra (1987) ISBN 9100470848
- Sprickorna i stenen (1994) ISBN 9100555959

Cultural offices
Preceded by Pär Lagerkvist	Swedish Academy, Seat No.8; 1975-2006	Succeeded by Jesper Svenbro
