= Ebba Lindqvist =

Swedish writer (1908–1995)

Ebba Helfrid Lindqvist-Galéen
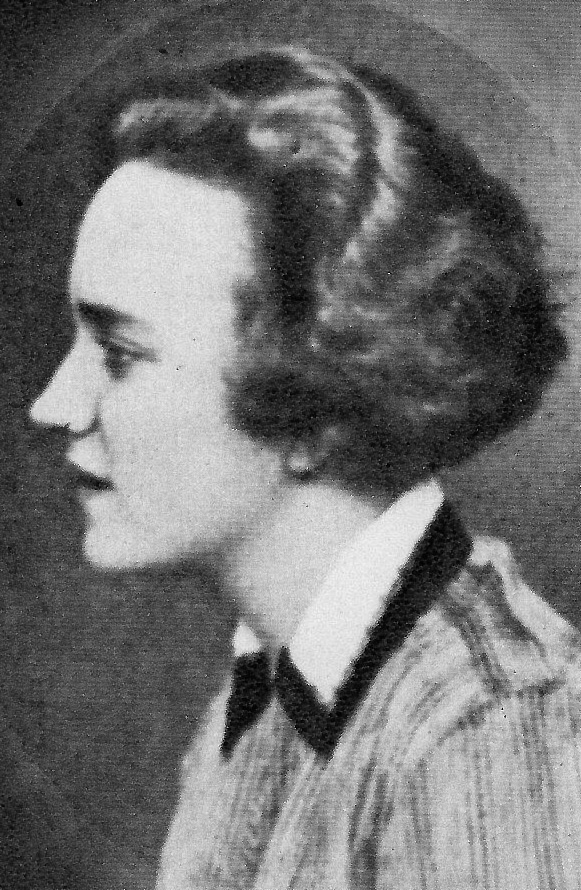
- Ebba Lindqvist in the early 1940s.
- Born: Ebba Helfrid Lindqvist; 7 April 1908; Oscar Fredrik parish, Gothenburg, Sweden
- Died: 5 September 1995 (aged 87); Varberg, Sweden
- Education: Uppsala University (Master's degree)
- Occupations: Poet, writer
- Spouse: Ivar Henrik Adolf Galéen (m. 1934–1985)
- Children: 3
- Writing career
- Language: Swedish
- Years active: 1931–1966
- Notable works: Jord och rymd (Earth and Space), Fiskläge (The Fishing Village), Manhattan, Karavan

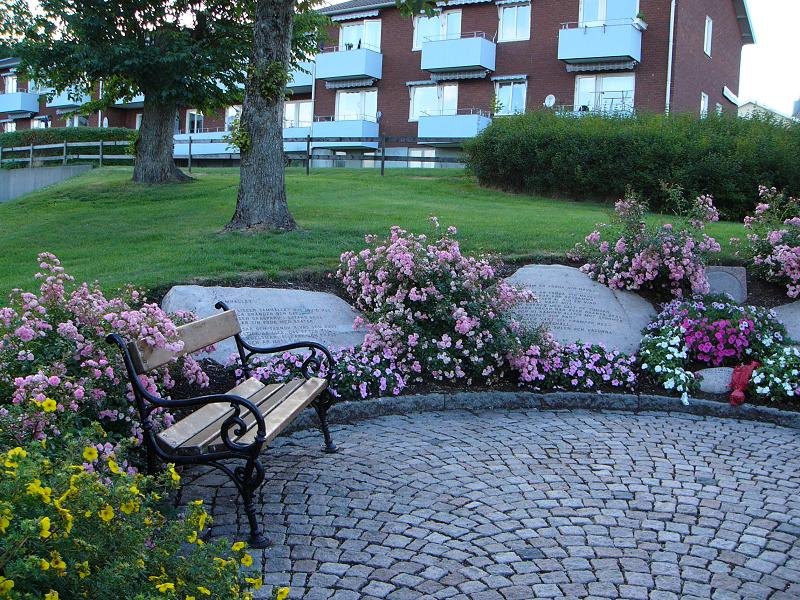
Ebba Lindqvist Place, Grebbestad

Ebba Helfrid Lindqvist-Galéen (7 April 1908 – 5 September 1995) was a Swedish poet. She studied for a Master's degree in Uppsala and became a Swedish teacher at Gothenburg upper secondary school for girls. Married in 1933 with business school graduate Ivar Galéen and eventually had three children. Poetry critic at Göteborgs Handels- och Sjöfartstidning from 1949 to 1956. In Grebbestad, the municipality of Tanum has established the memorial garden Ebba Lindqvist's Place with a bust by Per Agelii.

== Early life ==
Ebba Lindqvist was born 7 April 1908 in Oscar Fredrik parish, Gothenburg, and grew up in Grebbestad.

== Career ==
Her debut was in 1931 with the collection of poems Jord och rymd (Earth and Space), but her real breakthrough came with Fiskläge (The Fishing Village, 1939) depicting life in the Bohuslän archipelago.

In 1939 Lindqvist's husband and then Ebba Lindqvist herself with their two children moved to New York. They dared not stay in Sweden during World War II, as her husband was of Jewish descent. Lindqvist's impressions of New York were recorded in Manhattan in 1943 and in the short story collection Vägen till Jeriko (The Road to Jericho) 1946. After the war the family moved back to Gothenburg and had their third child. After a few years they left Sweden again, since her husband was placed overseas in his work. They lived a while in Lebanon and then in Nairobi. In 1958 the poetry collection Karavan was published, with designs from the Near East.

In 1964 Resa mellan fyra väggar (Journey between four walls) came out, whose motifs are largely taken from the Bible. The last collection of poems, Mässa för måsar (Mass for Gulls) appeared in 1966.

Many of Ebba Lindqvist's poems have been set to music. Composer Gosta Nystroem's Sinfonia del mare is built around his setting of Lindqvist's poem Det enda. Other composers who have set Lindqvist's poems to music are Torsten Sörenson, Ake Hermansson, Alfred Janson, Maurice Karkoff, Lars Edlund, Hilding Hallnäs, Martin Bagge, Vivan Myhrwold Lassen and Henrik Mossberg.

She was married 1934–1985 to Ivar Henrik Adolf Galéen, born 1909, and had three children: Anne-Marie, married Blom, born 1934, Monica Galéen, born 1936, and Ivar Henrik Andreas Galéen, born in 1947. She died 5 September 1995, in Varberg.

== Bibliography ==
=== Poetry collections ===
- Jord och rymd (Earth and Space) (1931)
- Lava (1933)
- Liv (Life) (1934)
- Lyrisk dagbok (Lyrical Diary) (1937)
- Fiskläge (Fishing village) (1939)
- Röd klänning (Red Dress) (1941)
- Manhattan (1943)
- Labyrint (Labyrinth) (1949)
- Sången om Fedra (The Song of Phaedra) (1952)
- De fåvitska jungfrurna (The Foolish Virgins) (1957)
- Karavan (1958)
- Lökar i november (Bulbs in November) (1963)
- Resa mellan fyra väggar (Journey Between Four Walls) (1964)
- Mässa för måsar (Mass for Gulls) (1966)

=== Short story collection ===
- Vägen till Jeriko (The Road to Jericho) (1946)

=== Together with other authors ===
- In 1987 Ebba Lindqvist and three other authors collaborated on the poetry collection Lyriskt partitur för 4 stämmor (Lyrical Score for 4 Voices) (ISBN 91-85414-63-8).

=== Collections ===
Warne publishing house published Hon som älskade havet. Samlade dikter av Ebba Lindqvist (She Who Loved the Sea. The Collected Poems of Ebba Lindqvist) in 1997, which contains all of Lindqvist's 14 collections of poetry. The second edition of the book also includes a brief biography of Ebba Lindqvist written by Birgitta Ivarson Bergsten (ISBN 91-86424-55-6).

== Awards and honours ==
- 1949: The magazine Ny Tid's Culture Prize (together with Gösta Nystroem)
- 1970: The Bellman Prize
- 1970: The Ferlin Prize
- 1970: Gothenburg and Bohus County Council's Cultural Prize
- 1970: The authors' Culture Prize (awarded by the Swedish Writers' Association)
- 1986: Tanum Municipality's Culture Prize, "for her significant literary artistry, especially for the already classic poems of the Bohuslän archipelago, with a background in the Grebbestad environment she grew up in and constantly returned to."
