= Johannes Edfelt =

Swedish writer, poet, translator and literary critic

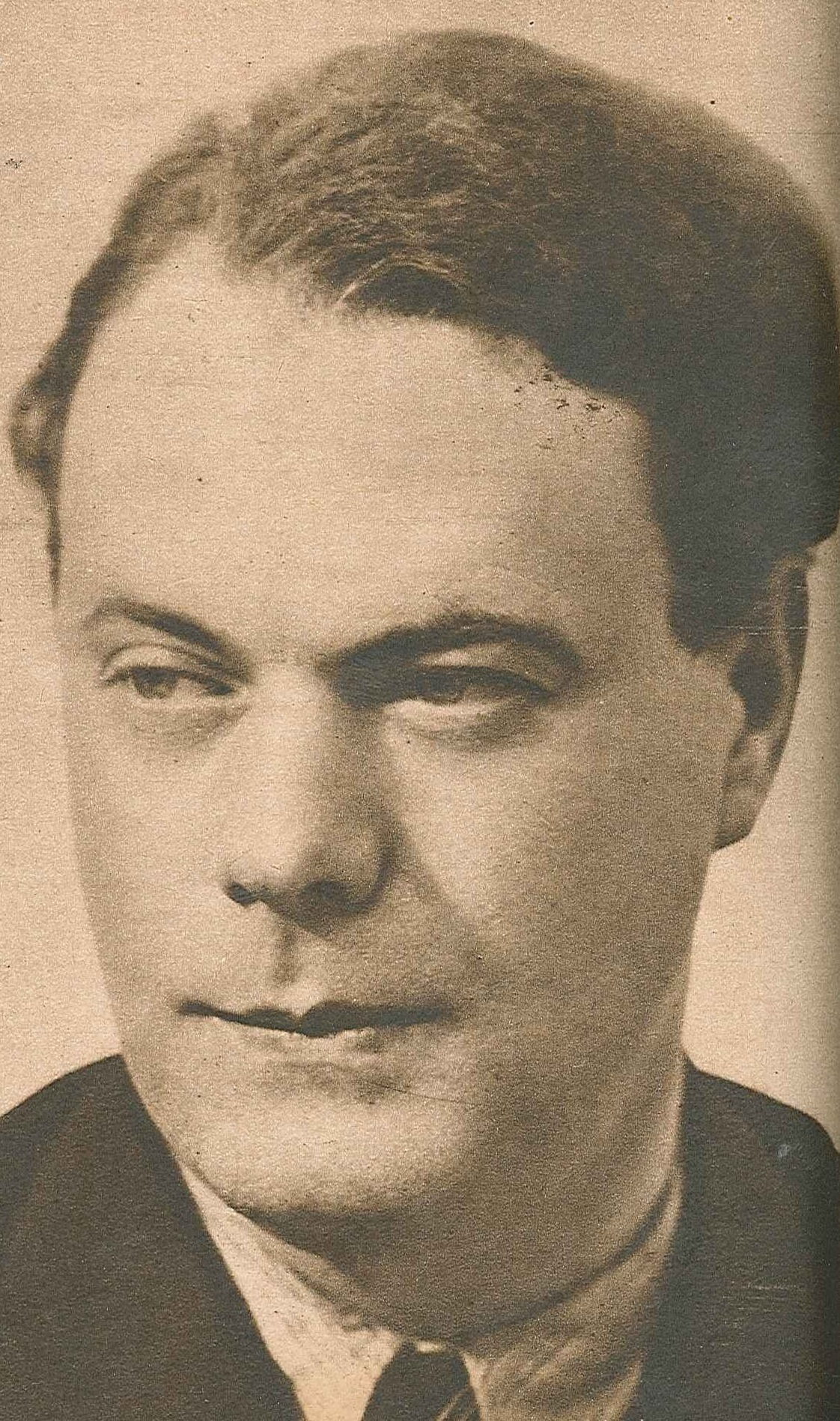
Johannes Edfelt in the early 1940s

Bo Johannes Edfelt (21 December 1904 – 27 August 1997) was a Swedish writer, poet, translator and literary critic.

A native of Tibro, Edfelt was elected to be a member of the Swedish Academy in 1969, occupying seat No. 17. He succeeded Erik Lindegren and, following his death, was succeeded by Horace Engdahl.

Amongst other writings, Edfelt translated works by Nelly Sachs, Georg Trakl, Novalis, Andreas Gryphius, T. S. Eliot and Ezra Pound.

== Biography ==
=== Youth ===
Edfelt was the son of lieutenant August Edfelt and Ellen Hellner. He grew up in Skara, where he studied Latin and Greek at the senior high school. In fall 1923, he studied Nordic Languages at Lund University. He also attended public lectures in Philosophy and History of Literature.

From 1924 to 1930, with exception from his military service in 1925–26, Edfelt studied Nordic Languages, English, German, History of Literature and Pedagogics, including a course in History of Philosophy, at Uppsala university. During this period, he attended student circles that discussed Sigmund Freud and Carl Gustav Jung.

=== Early career ===
After he had taken his master's degree in Uppsala in spring 1930, Edfelt moved to Stockholm. The financial crisis following the Wall Street crash of 1929 soon made its impact on the Swedish labor market, and in the beginning of the 30s Edfelt earned his living by writing literary reviews. In autumn 1931, he was hired as a temporary-staff master at the municipal school in Storvik in Gästrikland.

During winter 1930–31, Edfelt in Stockholm became acquainted with the female artist Hélène Apéria, to whom he later would dedicate his collection Aftonunderhållnng (Evening Entertainment). On 2 March 1932 the couple married at Nyloftet in Skansen in Stockholm.

In 1933 Edfelt temporary moved to the small town of Mariefred, where he completed his collection Högmässa (High Mass) under observation from the older poet Bertil Malmberg, who had settled down in the country idyll after his years in Munich.

== Poetry ==
=== Early books ===
In 1923, Edfelt made his debut with the poetry collection Gryningsröster (Dawn Voices), when he was only 19 years old. Then followed the collections Unga Dagar (Young Days, 1925) and Ansikten (Faces, 1929). Except the classics, he was influenced by Franz Werfel, Bertolt Brecht, Erich Kästner, Vilhelm Ekelund, Harriet Löwenhielm och Birger Sjöberg.

=== Breakthrough ===
Edfelt's mature poetry might be described as traditionalistic in form but modernistic in imagery. He got his major breakthrough in 1934 with Högmassa (High Mass), which was reviewed in many Swedish dailies. By that time, Edfelt was influenced by Swedish poets such as Bertil Malmberg, Birger Sjöberg, Bo Bergman and Erik Axel Karlfeldt but also by international celebrities such as Charles Baudelaire, Bertolt Brecht and T. S. Eliot.

Another characteristic trait for Edfelt's poetry from the 1930s are innumerous allusions to literature ranging from the Bible and ancient tragic playwrights to psychoanalysis and Modernism. Sometimes Edfelt even re-uses a part of the metric structure from older Swedish poets in order to create a certain mood.

Aftonunderhållning (Evening Entertainment) 1932, I Denna Natt (This Very Night) 1936, Vintern Är Lång (The Winter Is Long) 1939 and Sång för Reskamrater (Song for Travelling Companions) 1941 all belong to the same creative period as Högmässa. The contrast between dark human suffering and the redeeming flame of love distinguishes these books.

=== A new direction ===
In the collections Elden och Klyftan (The Fire and the Cleft, 1943) and Bråddjupt Eko (Precipitous Echo, 1947), Edfelt's poetry becomes more introspective. From Hemliga slagfält (Secret Battlefields, 1952) onwards, there is an element of prose poetry in his collections.

== Bibliography ==
=== Poetry ===
- Gryningsröster (1923)
- Unga dagar (1925)
- Ansikten (1929)
- Aftonunderhållning (1932)
- Högmässa (1934)
- I denna natt (1936)
- Vintern är lång (1939)
- Sång för reskamrater (1941)
- Elden och klyftan (1943)
- Bråddjupt eko (1947)
- Hemliga slagfält (1952)
- Under Saturnus (1956)
- Utblick (1958)
- Insyn (1962)
- Ådernät (1968)
- Dagar och nätter (1983)
- Följeslagare (1989)
- Mötesplatser (1992)
- Brännpunkter (1996)
- Dikter (2004)

=== Prose ===
- Dostojevski (1936)
- Strövtåg (1941)
- Heinrich Heine (1955)
- Årens spegel (1963)
- Birger Sjöberg (1971)
- Profiler och episoder (1973)

Cultural offices
| Preceded by Erik Lindegren | Swedish Academy, Seat No.17; 1969-1997 | Succeeded by Horace Engdahl |
