= Anna-Karin Palm =

Swedish writer

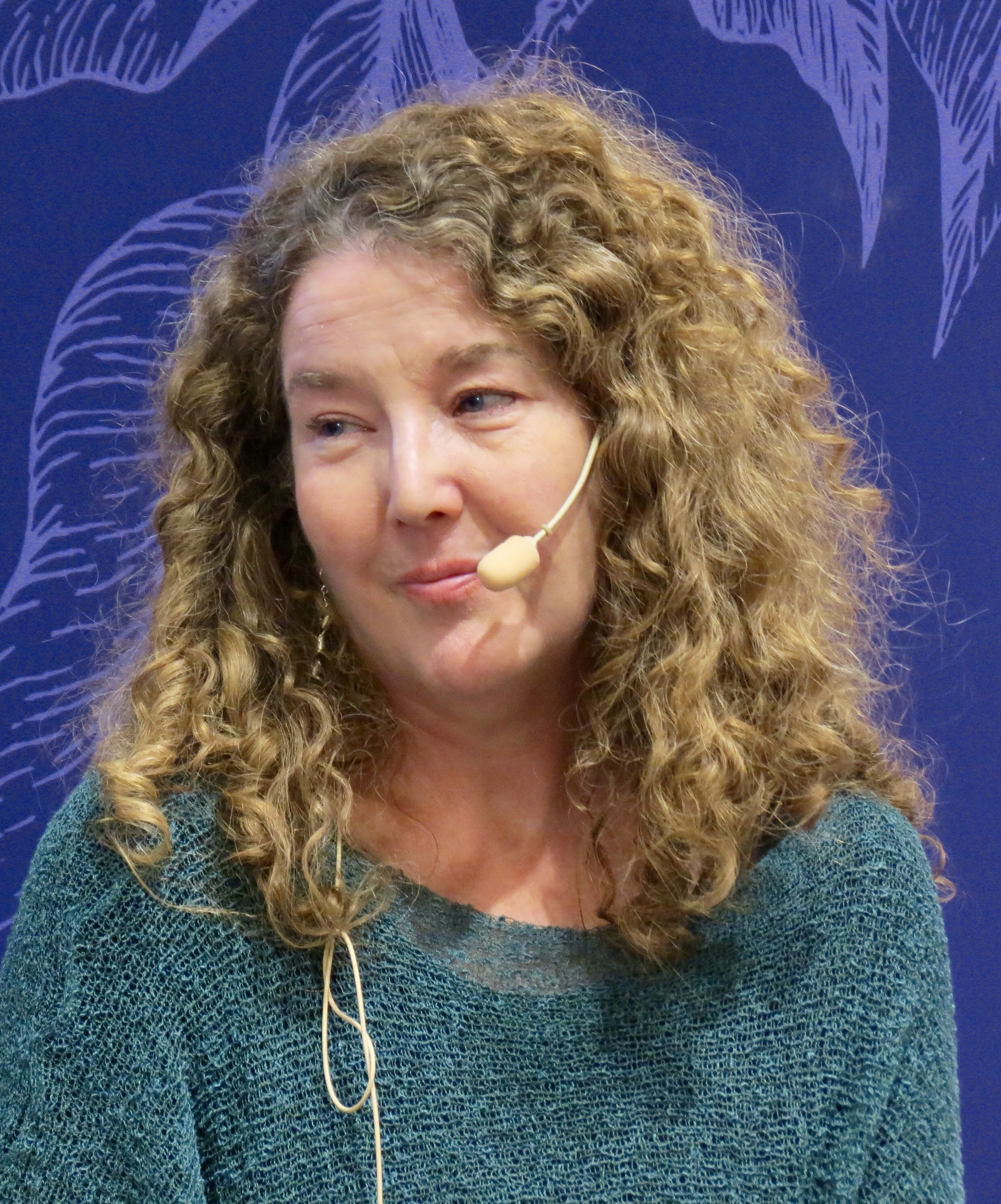
- Palm in 2019
- Born: 17 March 1961 (age 65); Stockholm, Sweden
- Education: Stockholm University
- Occupations: Author, culture writer

Member of the Swedish Academy (Seat No. 16)
- Incumbent
- Assumed office 20 December 2023
- Preceded by: Kjell Espmark

Anna-Karin Palm (born 17 March 1961) is a Swedish author and multiple award winner for culture writing. In May 2023, Palm was appointed to the Swedish Academy as a new member on chair number 16, assuming this position on 20 December 2023.

== Background ==
Palm grew up in Stockholm with a half-brother and a sister. Her mother trained as a doctor and her father studied engineering at Hermods.

After twelve years at the Waldorf school, Palm continued at Stockholm University with literature, philosophy and English and began PhD studies in literature at Uppsala University. For a time she was part of the editorial staff for 80s /90s, a Swedish literary magazine, and debuted in 1991 with her first novel Faunen. She has also worked, among other things, as a postal worker, cashier and reader of books for the visually impaired. Her sources of inspiration come from pictures, fairy tales, landscapes, literature and music.

== Authorship ==
Palm was first published in Novella 85, an anthology featuring contributions by debut authors. Then came another short story (1989) in the magazine 80s. Her debut novel Faunen received a very positive reception. This was followed by several novels and collections of short stories, children's books and essays. Anna-Karin Palm had her big breakthrough with the novel Målarens dötterr, 1997. It is about Maria and her brother who travel to England to search for their missing father who is an artist; the present-day story is connected with the story of Laura, who lived in England 100 years earlier with her father who was a painter. The book is a story about artistic freedom and female identity.

In 1999, both the picture book Wild Winter was published, with illustrations by Anna Bengtsson, as well as the prose book Playground, which Palm has described as a collection of more or less false, autobiographical anecdotes.

In 2001, the short story collection Into the desert came out - about short stories inspired by travels in the Middle East and Greece.

Herrgården (2005) is a novel where the story revolves around some people on the run. They flee a country stricken with civil war, villages lie in ruins, and the mansion they come to becomes their salvation. They get a room and work with the woman who owns the manor. The protagonist of the story is Ben, who takes advantage of the others' misfortune, he tells about the group's existence before, during and after the escape. Palm states that a short story in the collection In i öknen (2000) laid the foundation for Herrgården. Among the role models are Walter Ljungqvist and Eyvind Johnson, as well as Selma Lagerlöf and Virginia Woolf.

The essay book On Friendship (2007) was written by Palm together with friend, writer and philosopher Kate Larson; they are associative, personally reflective texts around varying themes, and the form of dialogic essay was invented by the friends together.

The novel Snow Angel (2011) moves between a small French village in the 21st century and Stockholm in the winter of 1985–1986. Questions of memory, language, history and identity are important, where realism is combined with fairy tales and allows the distance between places and times to illuminate each other. Palm's texts are characterized by strong female subjects and an interest in the human interior. In the novels, there is often a strong epic drive, a preference for multiple timelines or narrative voices and a clear awareness of form.

The short story collection Hunting Luck from 2014 revolves around the female body and explores sexuality, motherhood, illness and aging in a series of short stories. Åsa Beckman wrote in Dagens Nyheter about "a nice portrayal, where Palm shows how the characters get hurt in small and big ways because they didn't really include the body in their self".

In 2019, Palm's biography of Selma Lagerlöf, I want to set the world in motion, was published. The book was nominated for the August Prize for best non-fiction book, Dagens Nyheter's culture prize and the non-fiction book of the year, and was awarded the Lotten von Kraemer prize from the Society of the Nine.

In 2021, I write over your face, a book that describes how the author's mother falls ill with Alzheimer's disease was published. Palm talks here about her mother's life and her own upbringing, and reflects on memory, writing, class trips and family relationships.

Her short story Agnes & Betty was nominated in 2023 for Sveriges Radio's Short Story Award.

In 2023, she was appointed to the Royal Swedish Academy to assume seat number 16, a lifetime position, that was vacated with the death of the writer Kjell Espmark.

Palm's books have been translated into English, German, Dutch, French, Norwegian, Danish, Spanish, Polish, Icelandic and more.

== Family ==
Palm is married and has a daughter.

== Selected awards and honors ==
- 1993 – Albert Bonnier's scholarship fund for younger and newer writers
- 1998 – Society De Nios Special Prize
- 2015 – De Nios Winter Prize
- 2019 – Lotten von Kræmer prize
- 2022 – Dobloug Prize
- 2023 – Lifetime appointment to the Royal Swedish Academy
