= René Vázquez Díaz =

Cuban-Swedish writer and translator

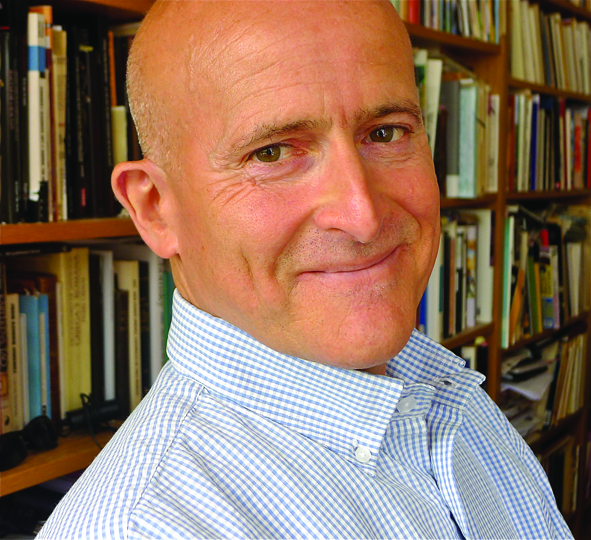
René Vázquez Díaz, photo by Merja Diaz, 2011.

René Vázquez Díaz is a Cuban-Swedish writer and translator, winner of the Radio France Internationale's Juan Rulfo Award 2007 for his novel Welcome to Miami Doctor Leal(Latin American Literary Review Press, Pittsburgh 2009). One of his most notable novels is The Island of Cundeamor. His latest published book is the autobiographical novel Ciudades junto al mar (Alianza Editorial, Madrid, 2011).

== Career ==
Vázquez Díaz has been a member of the Board of the Swedish Writers’ Union (2005-2012) and he is a member of the PEN Club. He has worked for the Group of Classics of the Swedish Arts Council, and he writes for Le Monde Diplomatique and other papers. As a member of the Board of the Swedish Writers’ Union, he was involved in the organisation of WALTIC (Writers’ and Literary Translators’ International Congress), which took place in Stockholm in 2008 with the participation of 500 writers, translators and academics from all over the world.

Vázquez Díaz holds a Bachelor of Arts and Sciences degree from the prestigious Escuela Vocacional de Vento in Havana. He left Cuba in 1972 and studied shipbuilding at the University of Gdansk, Poland. He defected to Sweden in December 1974, and he lived in the USA (Miami and Los Angeles) 1975-76. Vázquez Díaz resides in Sweden since 1976 and he is a Swedish citizen since 1979.

Vázquez Díaz founded the International Poetry Days in Malmö together with the Swedish poet Lasse Söderberg. He was a member of the Festival’s board since its inauguration in 1986 until 1992.

In 1994 René Vázquez Díaz organized, in coordination with the Olof Palme International Center, the so-called Encuentro de Estocolmo, the first National Reconciliation Reunion of Cuban writers living in Cuba and in exile.

Vázquez Díaz worked in the Olof Palme International Center 1994-1999. As a result of his work, the Center published the following books: Bipolaridad de la Cultura Cubana (1994), Health & Nutrition in Cuba: Effects of the US Embargo (1999) and Textos para cerrar un siglo (1999), published by the Olof Palme International Center.

Vázquez Díaz writes in Spanish and in Swedish and he has translated several Swedish books into Spanish. His own work has been translated into Swedish, French, Italian, English and Finnish.

He has lectured at the universities of Uppsala, Lund, Sundsvall, Stockholm, Sevilla, Málaga, Havana, Mexico (UNAM), Ghent, Antwerpen, etc.

Professor Martin Fanzbach, from the University of Bremen, Germany, has called Vazquez Díaz “the lone wolf of Cuban literature”.

== Bibliography ==
=== Works in Spanish ===
==== Cuban Trilogy ====
- La era imaginaria, Editorial Montesinos, Barcelona, 1986
- "La isla del cundeamor", Alfaguara, Madrid, 1995, and Editorial Letras Cubanas, La Habana, 2002
- "Un amor que se nos va", Editorial Montesinos, Barcelona, 2006

==== Other novels ====
- "Ciudades junto al mar", Alianza Editorial, Madrid, 2011.
- "El pez sabe que la lombriz oculta un anzuelo", Icaria Editorial, Barcelona, 2009
- "De pronto el doctor Leal", Icaria Editorial, Barcelona, 2008
- "Florina", Editorial Montesinos, Barcelona, 2007
- "Un amor que se nos va", Editorial Montesinos, Barcelona, 2006
- "Fredrika en el paraíso", Monte Ávila Editores, Caracas, 2000, and Ediciones de Boloña, Havana, 2004
- "Querido traidor", Alhambra, Lund, 1993

==== Poetry ====
- "Ciudad dormida / Stilla stad", bilingual edition, Studiekamratens förlag, Kristianstad, 1995
- "Difusos mapas", Devenir, Madrid, 1994
- "Donde se pudre la belleza", Ediciones A. Caffarena, Málaga,1986
- "Tambor de medianoche", Nordan, Stockholm, 1983
- "Trovador americano / Errante", Ámbito literario, Barcelona, 1978

==== Plays ====
- "El último concierto", Editorial Betania, Madrid, 1992

==== Gastronomy and short stories ====
- "El sabor de Cuba, Comer y beber", Tusquets Editores, Barcelona, 2002

=== Books about Cuba compiled by René Vázquez Díaz ===
- "Voces para cerrar un siglo, textos de Cuba y el exilio", foreword by Vázquez Díaz, Olof Palme International Center, Stockholm, 1999
- "Health and Nutrition in Cuba: effects of the U.S. Embargo", foreword by Vázquez Díaz, Olof Palme International Center, Stockholm, 1998
- "Bipolaridad de la cultura cubana, Ponencias del Primer Encuentro de Escritores de dentro y fuera de Cuba", foreword by Vázquez Díaz, Olof Palme International Center, Stockholm, 1994

=== Books written in Swedish ===
- "Skygga väsen, en ledsagare in i litteraturens värld", literary essays, 2012
- "Städer vid havet", novel, 2011
- "Oliktänkaren, en bok om Artur Lundkvist", 2006
- "Anteckningar i marginalen", articles and essays, 2000
- "Berusad kyckling, gastronomy and short stories", 1996

=== Translations ===
- "Mujeres en el norte. Trece poetas suecas", Devenir, Madrid, 2011. Poetry by Maria Vedin, Eva Ström, Katarina Frostenson, Marie Lundquist, Ida Börjel, Kristina Lugn, Tuija Nieminen Kristofersson, Sara Gilliard, Ann Jäderlund, Elisabeth Rynell, Eva Runefelt, Hanna Nordenhök and Åsa Maria Kraft.
- "Contexto. Material", Birgitta Trotzig, Colección Visor de poesía, Madrid, 2005.
- "Pompeya", Maja Lundgren, Narrativas Históricas Edhasa, Barcelona, 2004
- "El árbol parlante", Artur Lundkvist, Editorial Vigía, Matanzas, Cuba, 1998
- "La Habana era una fiesta", Björn Afzelius, Editorial Verbum, Madrid, 1995
- "Confines de la palabra", Birgitta Trotzig, Devenir, Madrid, 1991
- "Flechas contra la luna", Lasse Söderberg, Ediciones Angel Caffarena, Málaga, 1990
- "Ánima", Birgitta Trotzig, Ediciones Angel Caffarena, Málaga,1990
- "La estrella de la periferia", Jacques Werup, Ediciones Angel Caffarena, Málaga, 1990
- "Viajes del sueño y la fantasía", Artur Lundkvist, Editorial Montesinos, Barcelona, 1989
- "La huella abrupta", Ingemar Leckius, Devenir, Barcelona, 1987
- "La imagen desnuda", Artur Lundkvist, with drawings by Antonio Saura, Devenir, Madrid, 1987
- "Pájaro en mano", Lasse Söderberg, Devenir, Barcelona, 1986
- "Textos del ocaso", Artur Lundkvist, Montesinos, Barcelona, 1984
- "Seis poetas suecos", Birgitta Trotzig, Göran Sonnevi, Tomas Tranströmer, Ingemar Leckius, Lars Norén y Jacques Werup. Hora de Poesía, Barcelona, 1984.
