= Samfundet De Nio =

Swedish literary society

De Nio logotype

Samfundet De Nio (The Academy of the Nine) is a Swedish literary society founded on 14 February 1913 in Stockholm by a testamentary donation from writer Lotten von Kraemer. The society has nine members who are elected for life. Its purpose is to promote Swedish literature, peace and women's issues. It mainly presents a number of literary awards. It was started as an alternative to the Swedish Academy and is often compared to its more noted cousin.

== Membership ==
Four seats are always held by women and four by men. Seat number one, the chair, alternates between men and women.

=== Current members ===
- Seat 1: Anna Williams (chair), professor, since 2019.
- Seat 2: Nina Burton, author, since 1994
- Seat 3: Jonas Ellerström, author, translator, publisher, since 2017
- Seat 4: Marie Lundquist, author, since 2022
- Seat 5: Gunnar Harding, author, since 1993
- Seat 6: Sara Stridsberg, author, since 2021
- Seat 7: Niklas Rådström, author, since 1995
- Seat 8: Madeleine Gustafsson, author, arts critic, since 1999
- Seat 9: Johan Svedjedal, professor, literary critic, since 1995

=== Historical members ===
Original members: Viktor Almquist (chair), Selma Lagerlöf, Karl Wåhlin, Ellen Key, Erik Hedén, Kerstin Hård af Segerstad, Göran Björkman, Anna-Maria Roos, John Landquist

Some notable members over the years have been Astrid Lindgren, Elin Wägner, Marika Stiernstedt, Karin Boye, Hjalmar Gullberg, Karl Vennberg, Gunnel Vallquist, Kerstin Ekman, Sara Lidman, Birgitta Trotzig, Knut Ahnlund and Anders Olsson.

== Prizes ==
- Samfundet De Nios stora pris (Grand Prize), the main prize to Swedish literary writers, has been awarded annually since 1921.
  - Originally 10,000 Swedish krona. As of 2008 it is 250 000 SEK (about €23,000 or US$32,000).
- Lotten von Kraemer's prize (essays)
- De Nios translator's prize
- Stina Aronson's prize
- John Landquist's prize (essayist/idea historian/critic)
- Karl Vennberg's prize (young poets)
- De Nios Winter prize
- De Nios Astrid Lindgren prize
- Anders and Veronica Öhman's prize
- De Nios Lyric poetry prize
- De Nios Special prizes

List of all winners

=== Winners of the Grand Prize ===
- 1916: E A Karlfeldt, Bertel Gripenberg, Vilhelm Ekelund, Axel Lundegård, Hilma Angered Strandberg, Oscar Stjärne, Verner von Heidenstam
- 1917: K.G. Ossiannilsson, Marika Stiernstedt
- 1919: K.G. Ossiannilsson
- 1920: Hans Larsson
- 1921: Olof Högberg
- 1922: Tor Hedberg
- 1923: Elin Wägner
- 1924: Vilhelm Ekelund, Gustaf Ullman
- 1925: Fredrik Vetterlund
- 1926: Hjalmar Bergman
- 1927: Sigfrid Siwertz
- 1928: Ludvig Nordström, Pär Lagerkvist
- 1929: Per Hallström, Axel Lundegård
- 1930: Erik Blomberg, Bertel Gripenberg
- 1931: Arvid Mörne, Ernst Didring
- 1932: Emilia Fogelklou
- 1933: K.G. Ossiannilsson
- 1934: Hjalmar Söderberg
- 1935: Yrjö Hirn, Jarl Hemmer
- 1936: Bertil Malmberg, Eyvind Johnson
- 1937: Gustaf Hellström
- 1938: Harry Martinson
- 1939: Vilhelm Moberg
- 1940: Elmer Diktonius, Bertel Gripenberg, Jarl Hemmer, Arvid Mörne, Emil Zilliacus
- 1941: Olle Hedberg
- 1942: No grand prize
- 1943: Sven Lidman
- 1944: Moa Martinson
- 1945: Frans G Bengtsson
- 1946: No grand prize
- 1947: Jan Fridegård
- 1948: Sigfrid Lindström
- 1949: Fritiof Nilsson Piraten, Johannes Edfelt
- 1950: Nils Ferlin
- 1951: Gunnar Ekelöf, Lucien Maury
- 1952: Irja Browallius
- 1953: Tage Aurell
- 1954: Gabriel Jönsson
- 1955: Sivar Arnér
- 1956: Bo Bergman, Walter Ljungquist, Stina Aronson
- 1957: Karl Vennberg
- 1958: Emil Zilliacus
- 1959: Anders Österling, Evert Taube
- 1960: Lars Ahlin
- 1961: Erik Lindegren, Gustaf Hedenvind Eriksson
- 1962: Hans Ruin
- 1963: Artur Lundkvist, Birgitta Trotzig
- 1964: Rabbe Enckell, Peder Sjögren
- 1965: Willy Kyrklund
- 1966: Lars Gyllensten
- 1967: Werner Aspenström, Carl Fries, Per E Rundquist
- 1968: Ivan Oljelund, Elsa Grave
- 1969: Albert Viksten, Lars Forssell
- 1970: Stig Claesson, Majken Johansson
- 1971: John Landquist
- 1972: Sune Jonsson
- 1973: Tito Colliander
- 1974: Sonja Åkesson
- 1975: Barbro Alving, Eva Moberg
- 1976: Sten Hagliden, Olov Hartman
- 1977: Sara Lidman
- 1978: Ingemar Leckius
- 1979: Hans Granlid, Tomas Tranströmer
- 1980: Lars Norén
- 1981: Rita Tornborg
- 1982: No grand prize
- 1983: Bengt-Emil Johnson
- 1984: Björn von Rosen
- 1985: Göran Palm
- 1986: Gunnar E Sandgren
- 1987: Lennart Hellsing
- 1988: Göran Sonnevi
- 1989: Katarina Frostenson
- 1990: Tobias Berggren, Lars Gustafsson
- 1991: Erik Beckman
- 1992: Göran Tunström
- 1993: Lennart Sjögren
- 1994: P O Enquist
- 1995: Bo Carpelan
- 1996: Lars Andersson
- 1997: Per Wästberg
- 1998: P C Jersild
- 1999: Sigrid Combüchen
- 2000: Kjell Espmark
- 2001: Tomas Tranströmer
- 2002: Bruno K. Öijer
- 2003: Ann Jäderlund
- 2004: Torgny Lindgren
- 2005: Klas Östergren
- 2006: Jacques Werup
- 2007: Tua Forsström
- 2008: Birgitta Lillpers
- 2009: Steve Sem-Sandberg
- 2010: Ingvar Björkeson
- 2011: Kristina Lugn
- 2012: Arne Johnsson
- 2013: Aris Fioretos
- 2014: Kjell Westö
- 2015: Sara Stridsberg
- 2016: Carola Hansson
- 2017: Agneta Pleijel
- 2018: Gunnar D. Hansson
- 2019: Ola Larsmo
- 2020: Jan Stolpe
- 2021: Eva Runefelt
- 2022: Kerstin Ekman
- 2023: Barbro Lindgren
- 2024: Göran Greider
- 2025: Eva-Stina Byggmästar and Ingela Strandberg
- 2026: Karolina Ramqvist

== Publications ==
The annual publication Vår Tid (Our Time) was published 1916–1925 and 1930. Svensk Litteraturtidskrift (ISSN 0039-663X) was published from 1938 to 1983. It contained essays, reviews and other texts about Swedish literature. Editors have included Olle Holmberg, Algot Werin and Knut Ahnlund. Samfundet De Nio also published Artes (1975–2005) together with the Swedish Academy, Royal Swedish Academy of Music and the Royal Swedish Academy of Arts. Since 2003 they publish a literary calendar together with Norstedts Förlag.
