= Alhambra Publishing =

Swedish publishing house

Alhambra Publishing is a Swedish publishing house established in 1986 to publish Swedish translations of Arabic classic and contemporary literature. Examples include translations of Ibn Khaldun's 14th-century Prolegomena, and of novels by Naguib Mahfouz. Alhambra's ambition "to show solidarity between all human cultures" has led it to also publish Swedish translations from other cultures, including China and Latin America. In addition, it established in the 1990s a popular science series, the "Alhambra pocket encyclopedia", comprising 85 titles by 2011.

Alhambra Publishing takes its name from the Alhambra in Spain.

== Writers ==
- Adonis
- Machado de Assis
- Hesham Bahari
- Albert Cossery
- Stig Dalager
- Ninar Esber
- Khalil Gibran
- Zeina Ghandour
- Shusha Guppy
- Frank Heller
- Sonallah Ibrahim
- Elias Khoury
- Ibrahim al-Koni
- Raouf Masaad
- Naguib Mahfouz
- Ibn al-Muqaffa
- Álvaro Mutis
- Nabil Naoum
- Rumi
- Hanan al-Shaykh
- Samuel Shimon
- Muhammed Shukri
- Ahdaf Soueif
- Torbjörn Säfve
- René Vázquez Díaz
- Jules Verne
- Najem Wali
- Washington Irving
