= Doireann MacDermott =

Irish philologist, translator and writer (1923–2024)

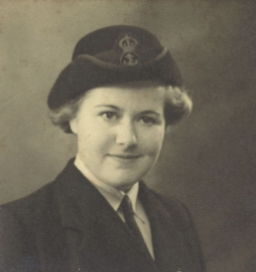
- WRNS photo of MacDermott, 1943
- Born: Doireann MacDermott Goodridge; 13 December 1923; Dublin, Ireland
- Died: 13 November 2024 (aged 100)
- Citizenship: British; Irish; Spanish
- Education: University of London; University of Geneva; University of Madrid
- Occupations: Translator; academic; writer
- Employer: University of Barcelona
- Spouse: Ramón Carnicer Blanco (m. 1953; died 2007)

Doireann MacDermott Goodridge (/ˈdɔːriən məkˈdɜːrmət/ DOR-ee-ən mək-DUR-mət; 13 December 1923 – 13 November 2024) was an Irish translator, writer, academic in the field of Spanish philology, and professor of English studies at the University of Barcelona. She pioneered the study of the language and literature of the English-speaking countries of the former Commonwealth.

== Early life ==
Doireann MacDermott Goodridge was born in Dublin, Ireland, on 13 December 1923 to an Irish father, Anthony MacDermott, who was an officer in the British Royal Navy and a Canadian mother, Evelyn Goodridge, who was born in St. John's, Newfoundland and Labrador and educated in Germany. From 1924 to 1930 she lived with her family in Bad Ischl, Austria. In 1930 they moved to the Isle of Wight, England. In 1939, her brother, Diarmuid MacDermott, died in the sinking of the British warship HMS Royal Oak, which was sunk by a German U-boat in Scapa Flow, off the northern coast of Scotland, at the beginning of the Second World War. In 1941 she enlisted in the Royal Navy, serving in various ports in the south-west of England, all of which were heavily bombarded.

== Academic career ==
In 1947, she began her studies at the Royal Holloway College at the University of London and obtained a degree in 1950. She took a French course at the University of Geneva, where she met her future husband, Ramón Carnicer Blanco. From 1950 to 1952 she taught at an international school in Switzerland. In 1952, she settled in Barcelona, Spain, where she was a professor at the British Institute until 1956. In June 1953, she married Blanco in Vallvidrera.

In 1953, the pair founded the School of Modern Languages at the University of Barcelona. From 1953 to 1967 she was professor and head of the English section at the School of Modern Languages. In 1955, she was appointed the first professor of the newly created department of Germanic Philology at the University of Barcelona. In 1962, she graduated in Philosophy and Letters from the University of Madrid. In 1964, she received her doctorate cum laude in Philosophy and Letters from the University of Barcelona, for her thesis "La otra cara de la justicia" ("The other face of justice"), a study on the world of crime in English literature, for which she received the Barcelona City Award, and was published in 1966 by Plaza & Janés.

MacDermott won the position of Institute chair and taught English Language at the Menendez Pelayo Institute in Barcelona. In 1967, she was appointed first chair of English Language and Literature of the University of Zaragoza, becoming the first woman to hold such a position there, as well as being one of the first nationally, and between 1968 and 1971 she directed UofZ's Institute of Language. In 1971, she became chair of English Language and Literature at the University of Barcelona and directed the English Philology Department from 1971 to 1989.

In 1978 she published the book Aldous Huxley, anticipation and return (Plaza & Janés, 1978) after a long research on Aldous Huxley and his work and a period at the University of California, San Diego. In 1978 she gave a course at the University of Barcelona on the colonisation of Australia. In 1980, she toured Australia, at the invitation of the Australian government.

Between 1990 and 1996, she chaired the European branch of the Association for Commonwealth Literature and Language Studies (ACLALS), dedicated to the study of the language and literature of the English-speaking Commonwealth countries such as Canada, Australia, India and Nigeria. MacDermott was a pioneer in the introduction into Spain postcolonial studies and published numerous articles on this subject. A conference named after her is held annually at the University of Barcelona.

Along with Irish citizenship, MacDermott also had British and Spanish citizenship.

She published books and numerous articles in Spain and other countries, and collaborated in magazines such as Laye and Historia y Vida and in academic publications in Spain and abroad. She organised and participated in numerous academic conferences. She translated numerous books to/from English and also from German and French into Spanish, some in collaboration with her husband. She curated the Universal Classics series for the Editorial Planeta publishing house. She wrote encyclopedia articles on the topic of English authors, 16 for the Enciclopedia Salvat and 13 for the Gran Enciclopedia Rialp.

== Death ==
MacDermott died on 13 November 2024, aged 100.

== Works ==
=== Essays and literary studies ===
- "La representación de "Romeo y Julieta" en el teatro isabelino" [Representation of "Romeo and Juliet" in Elizabethan Theatre]. Estudios Escénicos, Cuadernos del Instituto del Teatro (in Spanish) (11). Barcelona: Institut del Teatre, Barcelona. 1965.
- La otra cara de la justicia (Thesis). Barcelona: Plaza & Janés. 1966. OCLC 807566128. Essay on the world of crime according to the testimony of English literature.
- Smelfungus and Yorick. Zaragoza: Faculty of Philosophy and Letters, University of Zaragoza. 1969. OCLC 807681445.
- Novelistas ingleses [English Novelists] (in Spanish). Madrid: Sociedad General Española de Librería. 1976. ISBN 8471431130. OCLC 803117928. – A profile of 24 English writers with a selection of texts.
- Aldous Huxley, anticipación y retorno [Aldous Huxley, anticipation and return] (in Spanish). Barcelona: Plaza & Janés. 1978. ISBN 8401340586. OCLC 642099577. Complete study of the life and work of Aldous Huxley.
- MacDermott, Doireann, ed. (1984). Autobiographical and biographical writing in the Commonwealth: proceedings of the EACLALS Conference 1984 (Report). Sabadell: EACLALS. ISBN 8439837291. OCLC 15369385.
- Civilización de los países de habla inglesa [Civilization of the English-speaking countries] (in Spanish). Barcelona. 1985. OCLC 433993152..
- MacDermott, Doireann; Ballyn, Susan, eds. (1988). A passage to somewhere else : the proceedings of the Commonwealth Conference held in the University of Barcelona 1987 (Report). Barcelona. OCLC 894775168.
- Ballyn, Susan; MacDermott, Doireann; Firth, Kathleen, eds. (1995). Australia's changing landscapes : proceedings of the Second EASA Conference : Sitges, 1993 (Report). Barcelona. ISBN 8447704750. OCLC 892254121.
- Ballyn, Susan; MacDermott, Doireann; Firth, Kathleen, eds. (1996). Who's who in EACLALS. Barcelona. ISBN 8447705404. OCLC 431700193.

=== Theatre ===
- Rosencrantz and Guildenstern are Dead but they Won't Lie Down. Barcelona: University Barcelona, 1982
- No Nunneries for Us, (1982).

=== As author of the introduction, chronology and bibliography ===
- Millington Synge, John (1982). Cuatro obras:The Aran Islands, The Shadow of the Glen, Riders to the Sea, The Playboy of the Western World [Four works...] (in Spanish). Madrid: Alhambra Publishing. ISBN 8420509191. OCLC 434631208.
- Dickens, Charles (1980). Los documentos póstumos del Club Pickwick [The Pickwick Papers] (in Spanish). Barcelona: Clásicos Universales Planeta.
- Hawthorne, Nathaniel (1982). La casa de las siete torres [The House of the Seven Gables] (in Spanish). Barcelona: Clásicos Universales Planeta. ISBN 8432038806. OCLC 434397912.
- Scott, Walter (1983). Rob Roy (in Spanish). Barcelona: Clásicos Universales Planeta.
- Sterne, Laurence (1984). Tristram Shandy (in Spanish). Barcelona: Clásicos Universales Planeta.
- Poe, Edgar Allan (1987). Cuentos [Stories] (in Spanish). Barcelona: Clásicos Universales Planeta. ISBN 8432069698. OCLC 911394721. (collection)
- Eliot, George (1988). El molino junto al Floss [The Mill on the Floss] (in Spanish). Barcelona: Clásicos Universales Planeta. OCLC 51030418.

== About Doireann MacDermott ==
- Festschrift from Lleida for Professor Doireann MacDermot. Lleida: Estudi General. 1990. ISBN 8478560483. OCLC 434568934.
