= Viksten =

Viksten is a surname. Notable people with the surname include:

- Albert Viksten (1898–1969), Swedish writer
- Daniel Viksten (born 1989), Swedish professional ice hockey player
- Steve Viksten (1960–2014), American television writer and voice actor
