= De Nios översättarpris =

De Nios översättarpris is a translation prize given by the Swedish literary society Samfundet De Nio. It was awarded for the first time in 1970.

== Winners ==
- 1970: Hans Björkegren and Irma Nordvang
- 1977: Bengt Jangfeldt
- 1978: Carl-Henrik Wittrock
- 1980: Géza Thinsz, János Csatlós and Pierre Zekeli
- 1982: Tord Bæckström, Ulrika Wallenström, Lars Erik Blomqvist and Caj Lundgren
- 1985: Eva Alexanderson
- 1986: Mårten Edlund
- 1987: Annika Ernstson, Arne Lundgren and Johan Malm
- 1988: Martin von Zweigbergk, Barbara Lönnqvist and Bertil Cavallin
- 1989: Marion Wajngot, Marianne Eyre, Eva Liljegren, Irmgard Pingel and Bengt Samuelson
- 1994: Anders Bodegård, Lasse Söderberg, Jan Stolpe and Ingvar Björkeson
- 1995: Ingrid Ingemark and Ulla Roseen
- 1996: Astrid Lundgren, Sture Pyk, Bertil Albrektson and Hans-Jacob Nilsson
- 1997: Thomas Warburton and Gun-Britt Sundström
- 1998: Jens Nordenhök
- 1999: Margaretha Holmqvist, Inger Johansson and Dan Shafran
- 2000: Staffan Holmgren
- 2001: Marianne Sandels and Tetz Rooke
- 2002: Hesham Bahari, Peter Handberg and Rose-Marie Nielsen
- 2005: Ervin Rosenberg, Camilla Frostell and Maria Ekman
- 2007: Carmen Cima, Maria Ortman and Martin Tegen
- 2009: Meta Ottosson, Erik Ågren, Karin Löfdahl, Hans Blomqvist, Jan Stolpe, Staffan Skott and Kerstin Gustafsson
- 2010: Hans Björkegren and Ulrika Wallenström
- 2011: Ulrika Wallenström and Lena E. Heyman
- 2012: Erik Andersson
- 2014: Aimée Delblanc
- 2018: Lena Fries-Gedin and John-Henri Holmberg
- 2019: Inger Johansson and Jan Henrik Swahn
- 2020: Jesper Högström and Ulla Roseen
- 2021: Malte Persson
- 2024: Jan Erik Bornlid, Ulla Ekblad-Forsgren, Hans-Jacob Nilsson and Linda Östergaard

== Sources ==
- Samfundet De Nios homepage.
- Samfundet De Nios översättarpris
