= Eva Alexanderson =

Swedish writer, translator and publisher

Eva Ingrid Elisabet Alexanderson
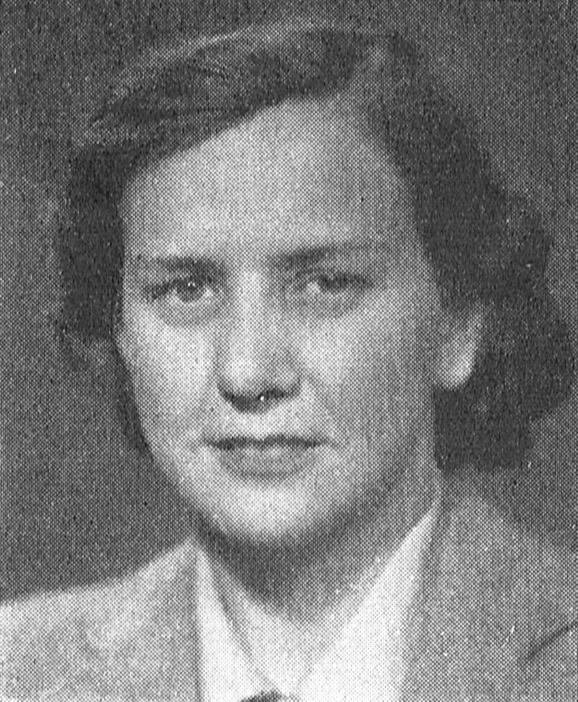
- Born: 9 January 1911; Vasastan, Stockholm
- Died: 20 December 1994 (aged 83)
- Occupations: writer, translator and publisher

Eva Ingrid Elisabet Alexanderson (9 January 1911 – 20 December 1994) was a Swedish writer, translator and publisher. Her best known works are her 1969 lesbian novel Kontradans and her 1983 translation of Umberto Eco's The Name of the Rose.

== Biography ==
Alexanderson was born in 1911 in Vasastan, Stockholm. She graduated from upper secondary school in 1930 and received a Bachelor of Arts from Lund University in 1935. She then joined the lexicography department of the publishing house Svenska Bokförlag, where she worked for three years. In this period she travelled for long periods to France, Italy and Spain, and translated Invertebrate Spain by José Ortega y Gasset in 1937. At the beginning of World War II she became a writer for the anti-Nazi newspaper Nu. In 1944, she married Gustaf Ragnvald Lundström, and they divorced in 1946.

After the war, Alexanderson worked as a senior publisher for the publishing house Bonniers from 1946 to 1955. In the 1940s, she translated and published a variety of works by Jean-Paul Sartre, Simone de Beauvoir and Jean Genet; other writers whose works she translated include Albert Camus, Jean-Jacques Rousseau, Fyodor Dostoyevsky, François-René de Chateaubriand, Alain Robbe-Grillet and Dario Fo. Her debut novel, Resa till smältpunkten, was published in 1954 and was set in a poverty-stricken developing country. In 1967, she published Pilgrimsfärd, a religious travelogue. She won the 1969 Elsa Thulins översättarpris for translation.

Alongside Annakarin Svedberg, Alexanderson was one of the most famous writers of lesbian fiction in Sweden in the 1960s. Her 1964 novel Fyrtio dagar y öknen (Forty Days in the Desert) features lesbianism as a minor theme; it is mentioned that the main character, a woman who travels to Norway to recover from a disease and converts to Catholicism, has had previous erotic relationships with women. However, lesbianism became the central theme in Alexanderson's novel Kontradans (1969, Contra Dance), which depicts two women who fall in love at a commune. The story may have been autobiographical as the main character, like Alexanderson, is a writer named Eva who writes a novel about lesbians. Kontradans caused controversy upon its release and Alexanderson did not publish another novel for more than two decades.

Alexanderson's 1983 translation of Umberto Eco's The Name of the Rose was well received by critics and readers and won the Letterstedtska priset in 1985. In the same year, she won the Samfundet De Nio's translation prize. Alexanderson's final novel, Sparkplats för jungfrun – ett socialmänskligt collage, was published in 1992 before her death in 1994.
