= De Nios lyrikpris =

- Country: Sweden
- Presented by: Samfundet De Nio
- Reward: 125 000 SEK (per recipient)
- First award: 2008
- Final award: 2008

De Nios lyrikpris (English: De Nio Lyrical Prize) is a Swedish literature prize given by Samfundet De Nio since 2008. The prize has however been given only one time. The prize money is 125 000 Swedish kronor two times.

== Recipients ==
Year	Recipient	Notes
2008	Marie Lundquist	Award of 125,000 SEK.
2008	Eva Runefelt	Award of 125,000 SEK.
