= Tomas Riad =

Swedish linguist (born 1959)

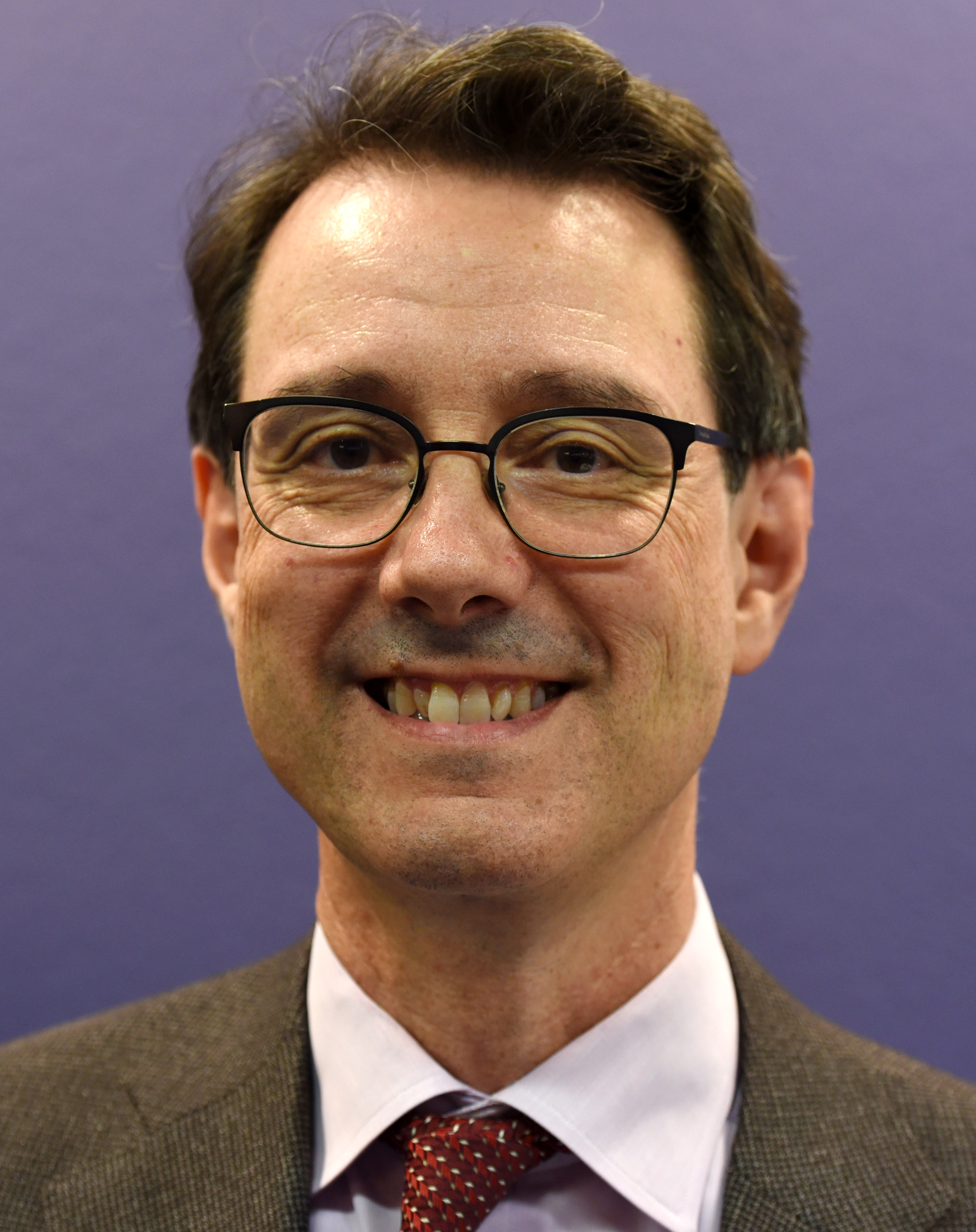
- Riad in 2019
- Born: Tomas Staffan Riad; 15 November 1959 (age 66); Uppsala, Sweden
- Education: Stockholm University
- Occupations: Linguist, musician, writer
- Employer(s): Stockholm University; University of Gothenburg

Member of the Swedish Academy (Seat No. 6)
- Incumbent
- Assumed office 20 December 2011
- Preceded by: Birgitta Trotzig

Tomas Staffan Riad (born 15 November 1959) is a Swedish linguist, specialised in Swedish phonology and prosody. He received his Ph.D. from Stockholm University in 1992 and is professor at the Department of Scandinavian languages there. Riad is also a violinist, trained at the Royal College of Music in London and has worked as a full-time musician. He was elected a member of the Swedish Academy on 29 September 2011 (taking his seat on 20 December).

== Bibliography ==
- Squibs, remarks and replies (1988); co-authors: Elly van Gelderen &, Arild Hestvik
- Reflexivity and predication (1988)
- Structures in Germanic Prosody. A diachronic study with special reference to the Nordic languages (1992)
- Birgitta Trotzig – Svenska Akademien Inträdestal (2011)
- The Phonology of Swedish (2014)

=== As editor ===
- Tones and Tunes: Typological Studies in Word and Sentence Prosody (2007)
- Tones and Tunes: Experimental Studies in Word and Sentence Prosody (2007)
- Typological Studies in Word and Sentence Prosody (2007)
- Studier i svensk språkhistoria. 12, Variation och förändring (2014)

== Notes ==
Cultural offices
| Preceded by Birgitta Trotzig | Swedish Academy, Seat No.6; 2011–present | Incumbent |
