= Joshua Mehigan =

American poet (born 1969)

Joshua Mehigan (born June 1969) is an American poet.

== Life and career ==
Joshua Mehigan was born and raised in Upstate New York. He earned a BA from Purchase College and an MFA in creative writing from Sarah Lawrence College. Mehigan has worked as a communications professional, editor, and teacher. He lives in Brooklyn, New York.

Mehigan's first book, The Optimist (Ohio University Press, 2004) was one of five finalists for the 2005 Los Angeles Times Book Prize. Mehigan's poems have appeared in periodicals such as Poetry, The New Yorker, The New York Times, The Paris Review, Parnassus: Poetry in Review, Ploughshares, and The New Republic. His poems have also been featured on Poetry Daily and The Writer's Almanac, and have been published in the German journals Akzente, Krachkultur, and Zeichen & Wunder, in German translations by Christophe Fricker. Mehigan's verse translations and critical prose have appeared in Poetry Magazine and other periodicals.

Critics have praised Mehigan's verse for its directness, moral complexity, and mastery of meter, rhythm, and rhyme.

In a review for Poetry Magazine, D.H. Tracy called The Optimist, "A work of some poise and finish, by turns delicate and robust, making balanced use of the imposing and receptive facets of intelligence. This is a poet with absolutely no reliance on madness or on romantic mismatch between himself and the world, and he should, at the very least, be able to keep doing what he's doing as impressively as he has been doing it, which is awfully impressively."

Adam Kirsch, writing for The New York Sun, called Mehigan's work "Frost-like in the way he plays speech rhythms against the patterns of verse, creating a tense, deceptively simple music. . . . " and adds that "Mr. Mehigan also has something of Frost's delight in darkness; many of his poems offer the uncomfortable surprise that Poe called the most important element of poetry."

== Awards and recognition ==
- Levinson Prize from Poetry Magazine
- NEA (National Endowment for the Arts) Literature Fellowship winner, 2011
- Editors Choice Award for best feature article from Poetry Magazine for "I Thought You Were a Poet: A Notebook" an essay exploring the connections between madness and Poetry, 2011.
- Op-ed Contributor, "The Polling Place," a poem, published as part of an Election Day feature, "The Measure of Democracy." The New York Times, 2008.
- Pushcart Prize, 2005
- Los Angeles Times Book Prize Finalist, 2005.
- Mehigan profiled in the City Section of The New York Times, "Finding the Verse in Adversity," 2005
- The Optimist selected as a Big Ten University Press Pick, by ForeWord, 2005.
- Hollis Summer Summers Poetry Prize, 2004
- Dogwood Poetry Prize, 2004.

== Work ==
=== Books ===
- Accepting the Disaster (Farrar, Straus, and Giroux, 2014), poetry, 96 pages, ISBN 978-0374535469
- The Optimist (Ohio University Press, 2004), poetry, 72 pages, ISBN 978-0821416129
- Confusing Weather, chapbook (Black Cat Press, 1998)

=== Anthologies ===
- The Swallow Anthology of New American Poets, David Yezzi, ed. (Swallow Press/Ohio University, 2009), ISBN 0-8040-1121-4
- Bright Wings, Billy Collins, ed. (Columbia University Press, 2009) ISBN 0-231-15084-9
- Poetry: A Pocket Anthology, R.S. Gwynn, ed. (Longman, Penguin Academics Series, 2007), ISBN 0-321-24496-6
- Writing Metrical Poems, William Baer, ed. (Writer's Digest, 2006), ISBN 1-58297-415-2
- Poetry Calendar, (Alhambra Publishing, annually 2006–2011), ISBN 978-2-87448-032-4
