= Majken Johansson =

Swedish poet, writer and Salvation Army soldier

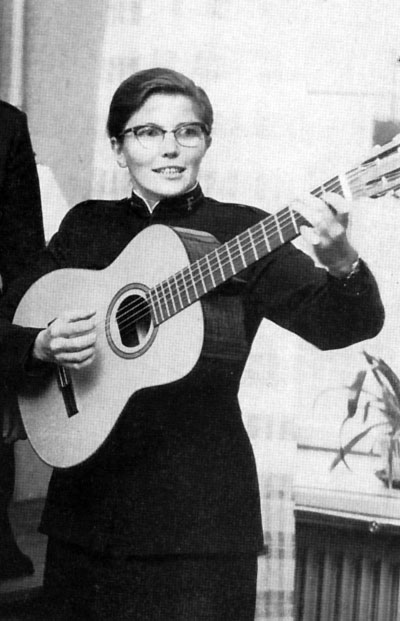
Majken Johansson.

Majken Johansson (August 7, 1930, Malmö – December 11, 1993) was a Swedish poet, writer and a Salvation Army soldier.

Majken Johansson was born out of wedlock in Malmö, and spent her childhood in foster care with an abusive foster mother. At the age of nine, she was evacuated from Malmö at the outbreak of World War II and lived with relatives in Småland. Despite her difficult childhood, she went through school with good grades and managed to earn admissions at the prestigious Lund University, where she graduated. She also suffered from alcoholism during her teenage and university years. In 1956, after a stormy relationship with another woman, which ended with the woman committing suicide, Majken Johansson suffered a life crisis which would lead to her decision to join the Swedish section of the Salvation Army in 1958.

She began to write in the early 1950s, both socially debating articles in newspapers and writing poetry. Her first volume of poetry was the critically acclaimed Buskteater in 1952. She published 8 volumes of poetry between 1952 and 1989. Her poems are not only concerned with life, love and God, but also on everyday reflections in a very simple and keen way, often with a lot of humor.

Her life partner was the Salvation Army officer and hymn writer Karin Hartman, who in 2002 published Bottenglädjen, a book about Majken Johansson's life.

In recent years, Johansson's poetry has been published in new editions and gained a generation of new readers. She is today regarded as one of Sweden's greatest poets of the mid-20th century, alongside names such as Hjalmar Gullberg and Werner Aspenström. In 1970 she was awarded the Large Prize by Samfundet De Nio. She was also awarded a literary prize by the magazine Vi in 1958, the Sveriges Radios poetry award in 1965, the Deverthska kulturstiftelsens Forsethpris in 1972, and the Sydsvenska Dagbladets kulturpris in 1975.

== Works ==
- Buskteater (1952)
- I grund och botten (1956)
- Andens undanflykt (1958)
- Liksom överlämnad (1965)
- Omtal (1969)
- Från Magdala (1972)
- Söndagstankar (1978)
- Djup ropar till djup (1989)
- Dikter - Majken Johansson (Bonniers 2002; collected poems)
