= Marika Stiernstedt =

Swedish writer

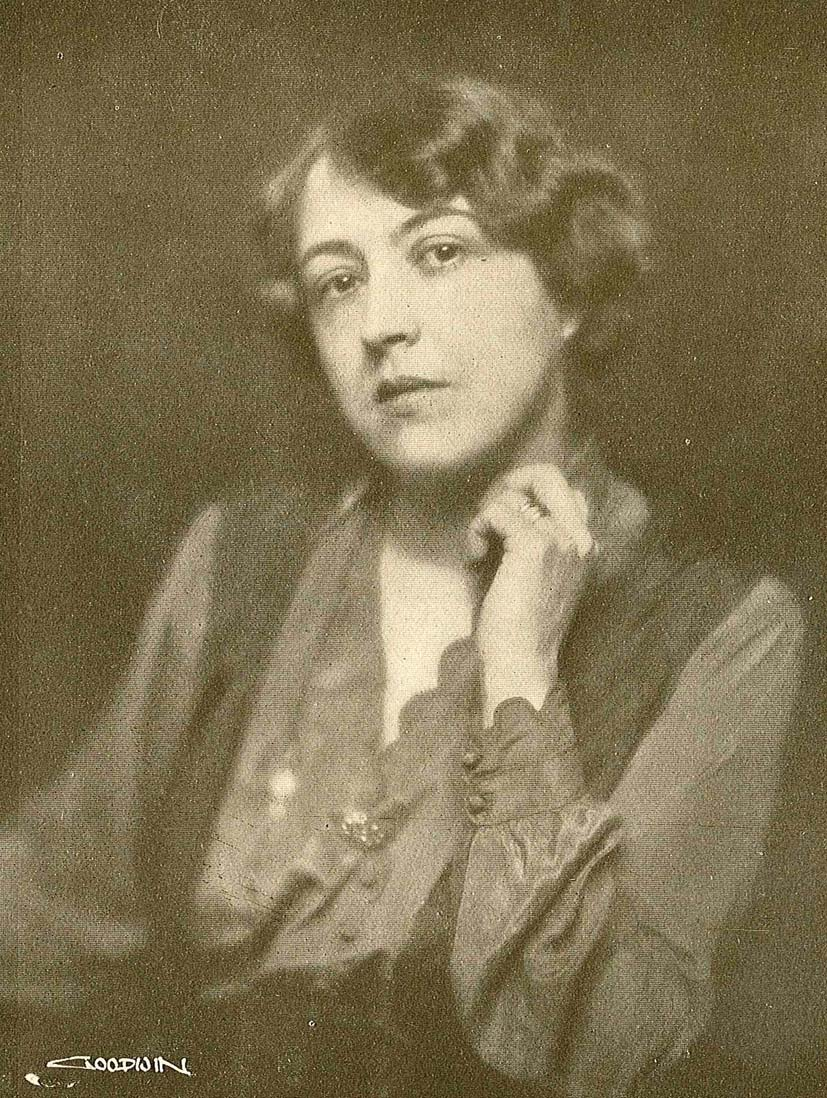
- Stiernstedt in 1918
- Born: 12 January 1875; Stockholm, Sweden
- Died: 25 October 1954 (aged 79); Finja, Sweden
- Occupation: Novelist
- Spouses: Carl Cederström, Ludvig Nordström
- Children: Lena Cederström

Maria Sofia Alexandra "Marika" Stiernstedt (12 January 1875 – 25 October 1954) was a Swedish author and artist.

== Biography ==
Stiernstedt was born a Catholic and remained one for life. She was a socialist despite her background; she came from a baroque aristocratic environment, her father Leonard Wilhelm Stiernstedt was a free lord and her mother Marie Pauline Victoria Ciechanowiecka was a Polish Countess. In her work she paid tribute to middle-class women, who could have a decent education and do something. Her marriage to the author Ludvig Nordström was of great interest to her contemporaries and is depicted in the book Kring ett äktenskap (About a marriage).

Her first works, the short story "Stackars Josef" (Poor Josef) in 1892 and the first novel, Sven Vingedal, were published under the pseudonym Mark Stern. Her father contributed to the release of the latter.

Stiernstedt's most famous books are considered to be the novels Fröken Liwin (Miss Liwin), which describes the contradictions between mother and daughter and the problems of aging alone, and Spegling i en skärva (Mirroring in a shard), a selection of short stories Bland människor (Among people), and the youth book Ullabella, the portrait book Mest sanning (Mostly truth) and the memoir volumes Mitt och de mina and Adjö min gröna ungdom (Goodbye my green youth). She also made herself known through the publication of various travelogues and newspaper articles

Marika Stiernstedt, together with Hjalmar Branting, was among the first to become aware of and report on the Armenian genocide in the Ottoman Empire. In the book Armeniernas fruktansvärda läge (The terrible situation for the Armenians) (1917) she wrote about the genocide.

During the First World War she was active as an anti-war author. During the Second World War she wrote anti-Nazi literature.

At a young age, she worked on watercolor painting and caricature drawing, and some of her drawings can be found in the memoir Adjö min gröna ungdom published in 1930. During a stay in Paris in 1907, she got to know Jules Pascin who was very impressed by her artwork.

Stiernstedt was chairperson of the Swedish Writers' Association 1931–1936 and 1940–1943.

In her first marriage, Stiernstedt was married to the "flying baron" Carl Cederström 1900–1906. In this marriage, her daughter Lena Cederström was born. In her second marriage, Stiernstedt was married to the author Ludvig Nordström in 1909–1936. She was the sister of Georg Stjernstedt and niece of Sophie Stjernstedt. Marika Stiernstedt is buried at Vikens cemetery at Öresund.

== Awards ==
She was awarded the Samfundet De Nio grand prize in 1917 with the then sum of SEK 2,000 and was elected the following year as a member of the society.

== Publications ==
- 1897 – "Elise: novell"
- 1897 – Guldnålen : skiss / af Mark Stern
- 1909 – Det första hjärtat
- 1910 – Lilas äktenskap
- 1911 – Landshövdingens dotter
- 1912 – Daniela Herz
- 1913 – Alma Wittfogels rykte
- 1913 – Janinas hjärta
- 1916 – Frankrikes själ
- 1917 – Armeniernas fruktansvärda läge
- 1917 – En officershistoria och några andra berättelser
- 1920 – Världen och stjärnorna
- 1922 – Ullabella (ungdomsbok)
- 1924 – von Sneckenströms
- 1925 – Fröken Liwin
- 1927 – Resning i målet
- 1928 – Mitt och de mina, autobiography
- 1929 – Hos hög och låg i Marocko, travelogue
- 1930 – Daniel Herz
- 1930 – Adjö min gröna ungdom, autobiography
- 1933 – De fyra marskalkstavarna
- 1935 – Ryskt, travelogue
- 1936 – Spegling i en skärva
- 1939 – Allvar i Frankrike (intryck från en resa)
- 1940 – Man glömmer ingenting
- 1942 – Attentat i Paris
- 1944 – Indiansommar 39
- 1946 – Polsk revolution
- 1947 – Banketten
- 1948 – Mest sanning, autobiography
- 1953 – Kring ett äktenskap, autobiography
- 1954 – Bland människor
