= Gunnar Harding =

Swedish poet, novelist, essayist and translator

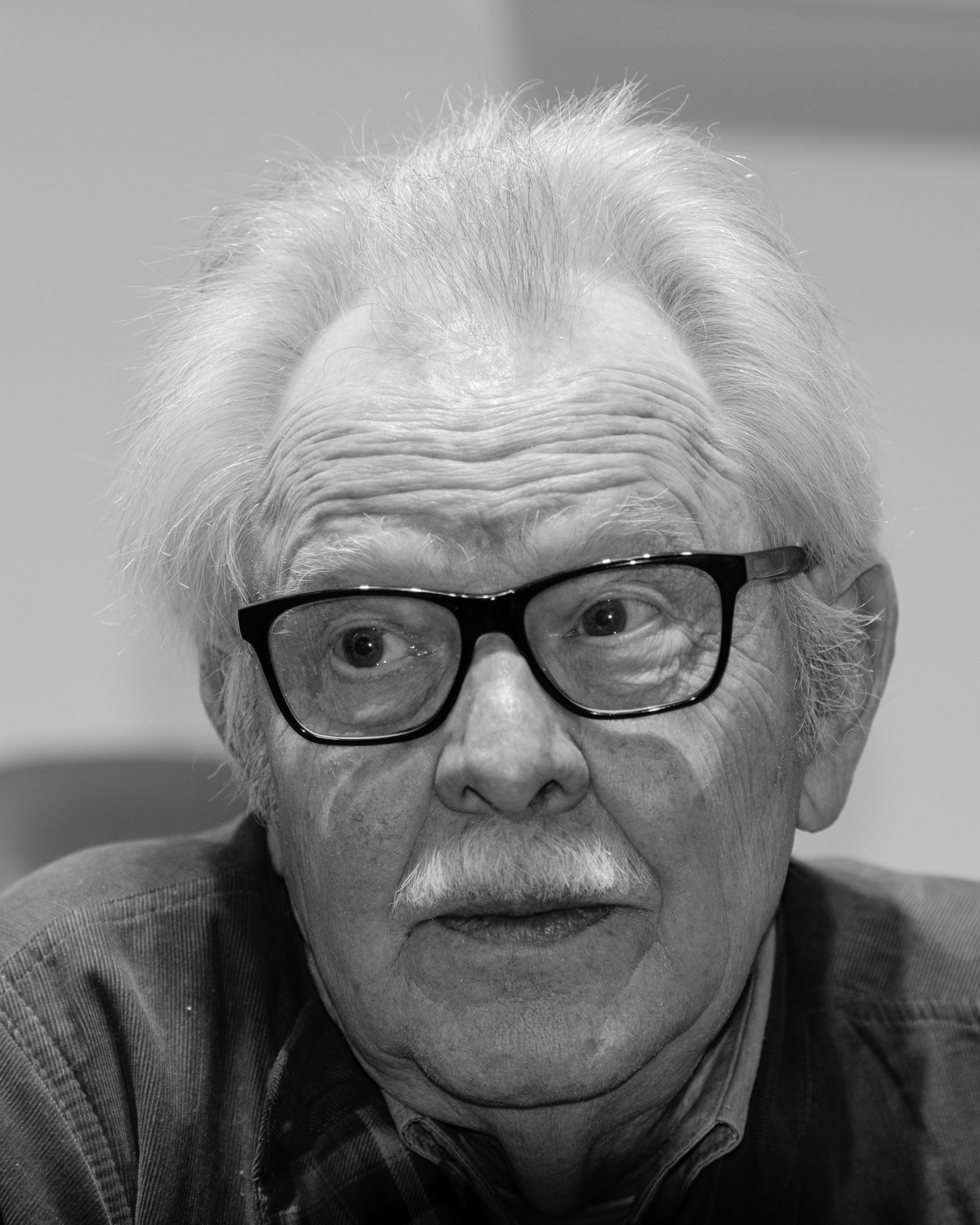
- Born: 11 June 1940 (age 86); Sundsvall, Sweden
- Occupations: Poet, novelist, essayist and translator
- Awards: Dobloug Prize (2011)

Karl Gunnar Harding (born 11 June 1940) is a Swedish poet, novelist, essayist and translator, considered 'one of Sweden's foremost poets'. Among his other poetry collections is Starnberger See from 1977. Among his novels is Luffaren Svarta Hästen from 1977. He published the children's book Mannen och paraplyet in 1990. He was awarded the Dobloug Prize in 2011.

== Biography ==
Gunnar Harding was born in Sundsvall and brought up in Bromma as the son of the doctor Gösta Harding. He studied painting in Stockholm and was a jazz musician before making his literary debut in 1967 with Lokomotivet som frös fast. During his early career, Harding travelled extensively in America, and this influenced his work.

Harding is noted primarily for his poetry (mostly in free verse but also significant prose-poetry). Alongside this, he has written essays, a book about the origins of jazz called Kreol, and a few stories.

He has also worked as an editor, for Lyrikvännen ('poetry-lover') 1971–1974, for Artes for many years, and for Artes International during its five-year run. He has been a member of the Samfundet De Nio (chair number 5) since 1993 and served on the 1973 Swedish Bible committion 1981–1989.

Harding's literary significance is partly as an introducer of foreign modernism, especially French, American and British poetry, into Swedish literature.

Harding also takes a lively interest in jazz and likes to read his poetry with jazz as background music.

== Bibliography ==
=== Literary writing ===
- 1967 – Lokomotivet som frös fast
- 1968 – Den svenske cyklistens sång
- 1969 – Blommor till James Dean
- 1970 – Örnen har landat
- 1971 – Guillaume Apollinaires fantastiska liv
- 1972 – Skallgång
- 1974 – Poesi 1967–1973
- 1975 – Ballader
- 1977 – Starnberger See
- 1977 – Luffaren Svarta Hästen och det hemska rånmordet i Leksand
- 1978 – Bilddikt, with Olle Kåks
- 1978 – Den trådlösa fantasin
- 1980 – Tillbaka till dig
- 1983 – Gasljus
- 1987 – Stjärndykaren
- 1989 – Guillaume Apollinaires gåtfulla leende: en ändlös biografi
- 1990 – Mannen och paraplyet, text: Gunnar Harding; pictures: Catharina Günther-Rådström
- 1990 – Mitt vinterland
- 1991 – Kreol
- 1993 – Överallt där vinden finns: dikter i urval 1969–1990
- 1995 – Stora scenen
- 2001 – Tal på Övralid 6 juli 2001
- 2001 – Salongsstycken kring Dante Gabriel Rossetti
- 2003 – Det brinnande barnet
- 2007 – Dikter 1965–2003
- 2009 – Innerstad
- 2012 – Blues for Jimmy; Nordvästexpressen; Martin Luther King [from the author's original manuscript of Blommor till James Dean] (Tragus)
- 2013 – Mitt poetiska liv (autobiography)

=== Translations by Harding into Swedish ===
- 1966 – 4 poeter, translations from Lawrence Ferlinghetti, Allen Ginsberg, Anselm Hollo and Lionel Kearns (Bok och Bild)
- 1969 – Amerikansk undergroundpoesi (Wahlström & Widstrand)
- 1970 – Vladimir Majakovskij: För full hals, with Ulf Bergström (Wahlström & Widstrand)
- 1971 – Allen Ginsberg: Tårgas & Solrosor, with Gösta Friberg (FIB:s Lyrikklubb)
- 1976 – Den vrålande parnassen, with Bengt Jangfeldt (rysk avantgardepoesi)
- 1978 – O Paris – Apollinaire och hans epok i poesi, bild och dokument (FIB:s Lyrikklubb/Tiden)
- 1985 – Vladimir Majakovskij: Jag!, with Bengt Jangfeldt
- 1988 – Frank O'Hara: Till minne av mina känslor
- 1989 – Guillaume Apollinaire: Dikter till Lou, pictures by Olle Kåks
- 1995 – Är vi långt från Montmartre? Apollinaire och hans epok i poesi, bild och dokument
- 1997 – En katedral av färgat glas: Shelley, Byron, Keats och deras epok
- 1998 – 3 x New York, interpretations of John Ashbery, Kenneth Koch and Ron Padgett
- 2000 – Och drog likt drömmar bort: Coleridge, Wordsworth och deras epok
- 2002 – Där döda murar står: Lord Byron och hans samtida
- 2005 – Beat! (poetry and prose from the beat generation, with Per Planhammar)
- 2006 – Mina Loy: Baedeker för månresenärer
- 2007 – Catullus: Dikter om kärlek och hat, with Tore Janson
- 2012 – John Donne: Skabrösa elegier och heliga sonetter (Ellerströms)

=== Translations of Harding's work into English ===
- 1970 – The Fabulous Life of Guillaume Apollinaire, trans. by Sydney Bernard Smith (Iowa City: Windhover, 1970; Dublin: Raven Arts, 1982) [part of Guillaume Apollinaires fantastiska liv]
- 1973 – They Killed Sitting Bull and Other Poems, trans. by Robin Fulton (London: Magazine Editions) [a selection of 25 early poems], repr. with additional translations by Anselm Hollo as Tidewater (Grosse Pointe Farms, MI: Marick Press, 2009)
- 2014 – Gunnar Harding, Guarding the Air: Selected Poems of Gunnar Harding, ed. and trans. by Roger Greenwald (Boston, MA: Black Widow Press) [selected poems]

=== Anthologies ===
- 1979 – Modern Swedish Poetry in Translation, with Anselm Hollo

== Discography ==
- Jazz och Poesi - Gunnar Harding och Sumpens Swingsters (LP with text volume, 1982)

== Prizes and distinctions ==
- 1975 – Tidningen Vi:s litteraturpris
- 1987 – Stipendium ur Lena Vendelfelts minnesfond
- 1988 – Carl Emil Englund-priset för Stjärndykaren
- 1992 – Bellmanpriset
- 1995 – Svenska Dagbladets litteraturpris
- 2000 – Wahlström & Widstrands litteraturpris
- 2001 – Ferlinpriset
- 2001 – Övralidspriset
- 2002 – Letterstedtska priset för översättningar för Och drog likt drömmar bort: Coleridge, Wordsworth och deras epok
- 2004 – Sveriges Radios Lyrikpris
- 2008 – Litteris et Artibus
- 2010 – Karlfeldt-priset
- 2011 – Doblougska priset
- 2013 – Elsa Thulins översättarpris
