= Artes (magazine) =

Swedish cultural magazine

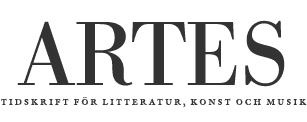
- Artes logotype
- Editor: Anna Brodow and Jan Arnald (2001-2005)
- Former editors: Östen Sjöstrand (1975-1988), Bengt Jangfeldt and Gunnar Harding (1989-2000)
- Categories: Music, art, literature
- Frequency: Quarterly
- Circulation: 1,500 (2004)
- Founded: 1975
- Final issue: 2005
- Country: Sweden
- Based in: Stockholm
- Language: Swedish
- Website: http://www.artes.se (archived)
- ISSN: 0345-0015

Artes was a Swedish cultural magazine about art, music and literature published between 1975 and 2005 in Sweden. Compared to younger magazines, it was known for its stability, genuine quality and as somewhat culturally conservative.

== History and profile ==
Artes was started in 1975 by the Royal Swedish Academy of Music, the Royal Swedish Academy of Arts and the Swedish Academy. Official representative was Horace Engdahl, as permanent secretary of the Swedish Academy.

Östen Sjöstrand was the editor. He opened it for advanced essays and held popular essay competitions. He did not avoid the esoteric and the magazine became of favourite of culturally interested readers. Sjöstrand also became a member of the Swedish Academy in 1975. According to critic Curt Bladh, this gave him insight into the discussions preceding the Nobel Prize in Literature and several prize winners were previously featured in Artes. Samfundet De Nio joined the magazine soon after its start.

In 1989 Bengt Jangfeldt and Gunnar Harding took over the magazine and turned it into more of "an educational institution" according to Horace Engdahl.

Anna Brodow and Jan Arnald took over as editors in 2001 and tried to increase the subscriptions and renew the content with more contemporary material. Anna Brodow commented that many of the magazines traditional readers were becoming too old for such heavy material. She also said that it was difficult to cover art, music and literature at the same time.

The magazine produced about 600 pages per year in its four issues. The circulation was about 1500 copies at the end. There was also an English-language periodical, Artes International. Artes was financed by subscriptions and subsidies. The academies of music and arts stood for 90,000 Swedish krona each per year, while Swedish Academy contributed the main part with 600,000 per year (about 55,000 EUR, US$76,000).

In April 2005 it was announced that the magazine would be closed at the end of the year. Then Artes was closed down in 2005 for economic reasons. The circulation of the magazine was 1,500 before its demise. It cost too much and had too few readers according to Beate Sydhoff, permanent secretary of the Academy of Arts. It had lost its government funding a few years earlier because the owners were deemed too economically strong to get subsidies.

== See also ==
- List of magazines in Sweden
