= Lotten von Kræmer =

Swedish writer, philanthropist

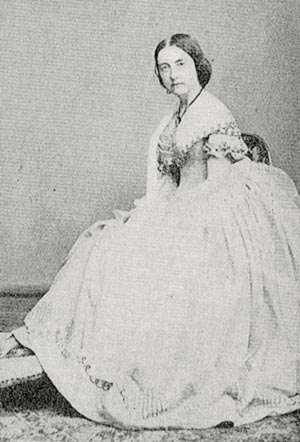
Lotten von Kræmer, mid 19th century

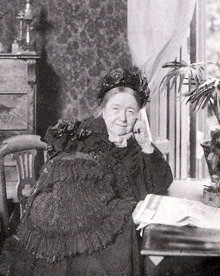
Lotten von Kraemer in 1908

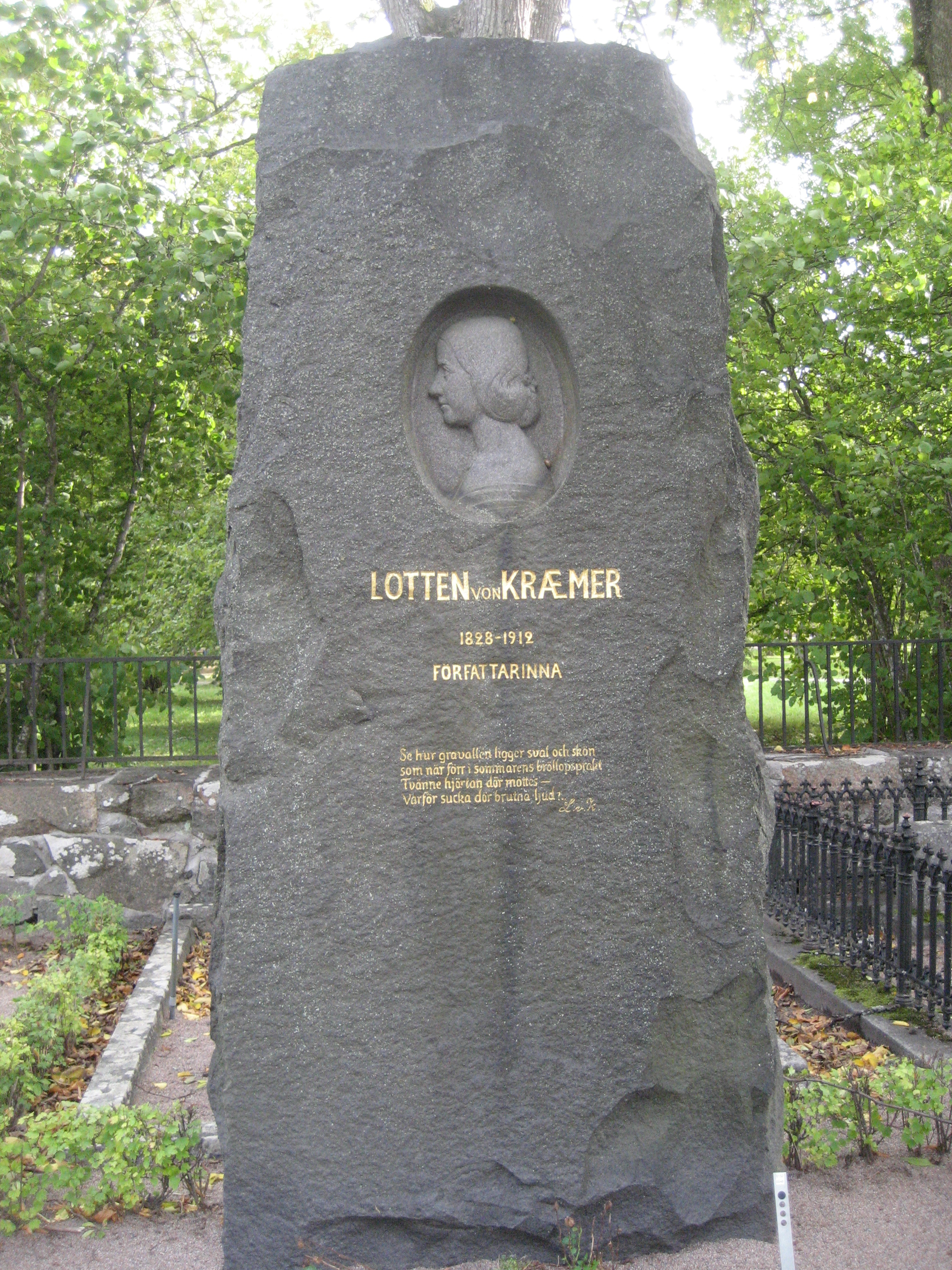
Grave (Uppsala)

Charlotte Louise "Lotten" von Kræmer (6 August 1828 – 23 December 1912) was a Swedish baroness, writer, poet, philanthropist and women's rights activist. She was the founder of the literary society Samfundet De Nio and, alongside Martina Bergman-Österberg, the main financier of the National Association for Women's Suffrage.

== Biography ==
Lotten von Kræmer was born in Stockholm. She was the daughter of the governor of Uppsala County, Baron Robert Fredrik von Kræmer and Maria Charlotte (Lotten) Söderberg and the sister of the writer, scientist and politician Robert von Kraemer. She was raised in the governor's residence at the Uppsala Castle in Uppsala, and received private education from the professors of the Uppsala University.

She was a popular participant in the cultural and intellectual society life in Uppsala. Authors such as Geijer and Atterbom were acquainted with her parents, and Fredrika Bremer was a friend of her mother. She herself proved her talent in various artistic fields: writing during literary evenings, dancing during the balls and acting in amateur theater, such as when she played the part of Jane Eyre, in which she was instructed by the actress Elise Hwasser.

She was treated by the physician William Wilde for her hearing problems and made friends with his wife Jane Wilde. They bonded over their interest in women's rights and literature.

In the summer of 1847, she visited Germany, Austria and Italy with her family. From 1847, however, her hearing slowly deteriorated as a consequence of scarlet fever, and she eventually became deaf. This ended her society life, which affected her deeply. In 1855, she was engaged to the conservative student Sten Johan Stenberg, but the engagement ended because of her deteriorating hearing and because Stenberg could not accept her radical ideas and her literary ambitions. She never married.

In 1880, her father died and she inherited a great fortune, which she is said to have managed very well. She moved to Stockholm, where she lived an increasingly spartan life over the years and eventually was regarded as a "tragic original." She spent a great deal of her fortune to finance various charitable organisations and reformers.

=== Social reformer ===
Von Kræmer was interested in social reforms, among them women's rights, and in 1872 she founded the first scholarship fund for female students at Uppsala University. She also financially supported the magazine Ord och Bild, the Fredrika Bremer Association, Friends of Handicraft and Östermalm's workhouse for poor children.

She also participated in the fight for women's suffrage and was one of the largest contributors to the National Association for Women's Political Suffrage (LKPR). During the International Suffrage Congress in Stockholm in June 1911, when the movement made a procession through the city, it stopped outside her balcony. in recognition of her importance to the movement. The Sixth Congress of the International Women's Suffrage Alliance had been largely financed by her.

=== Samfundet De Nio ===
Von Kræmer founded the exclusive Samfundet De Nio (Society of the Nine) and also bequeathed her fortune to the Society, which among other things resulted in the Lotten von Kræmer Prize. Her Collected Writings was published in 1918 by the community.

== Death ==
Von Kræmer died in Stockholm.

She is buried in Uppsala Old Cemetery.

== Bibliography ==
- Dikter, 1863
- Hemresan, song, 1864
- Fantasi-klängväxter kring verklighets stam, 1865
- Tankar i religiösa ämnen, 1866
- Strid' svenskt original, 1869
- Ackorder (poems), 1870
- Bland skotska berg och sjöar, 1870
- "Tout pour la patrie" (poems), 1872
- Nya dikter, 1882
- Felicia: svensk familjedram i tre akter, 1882
- Sånger och bilder, 1886
- En kämpande ande: religiösa dikter, 1886
- Florence Nightingale: poesi, 1886
- Poesiens vandring (illustrated by Jenny Nyström), 1888
- Karins bröllop, novel, 1890
- Hermes och Diotima: skådespel i fem akter, 1892
- Den kämpande anden: religiösa väckelser och religiöst liv: några sånger och tidsbilder, 1892
- Hägringar och luftslott (poems), 1895
- Skogsblommor: idyller och ballader (poems), 1896
- Eterneller (poems), 1896
- Två dikter, 1896
- Till Ingeborg och andra dikter, 1897
- Fama: skådespel i tre akter, 1902
- Fragment jämte andra dikter, 1902
- Nästa gång – : berättelser och skisser, 1902
- Testamente, 1913
- Samlade skrifter (published by Samfundet De Nio, with a biography by John Landquist), 1918
