= Hans Larsson =

Swedish Professor of Philosophy, humanist and author

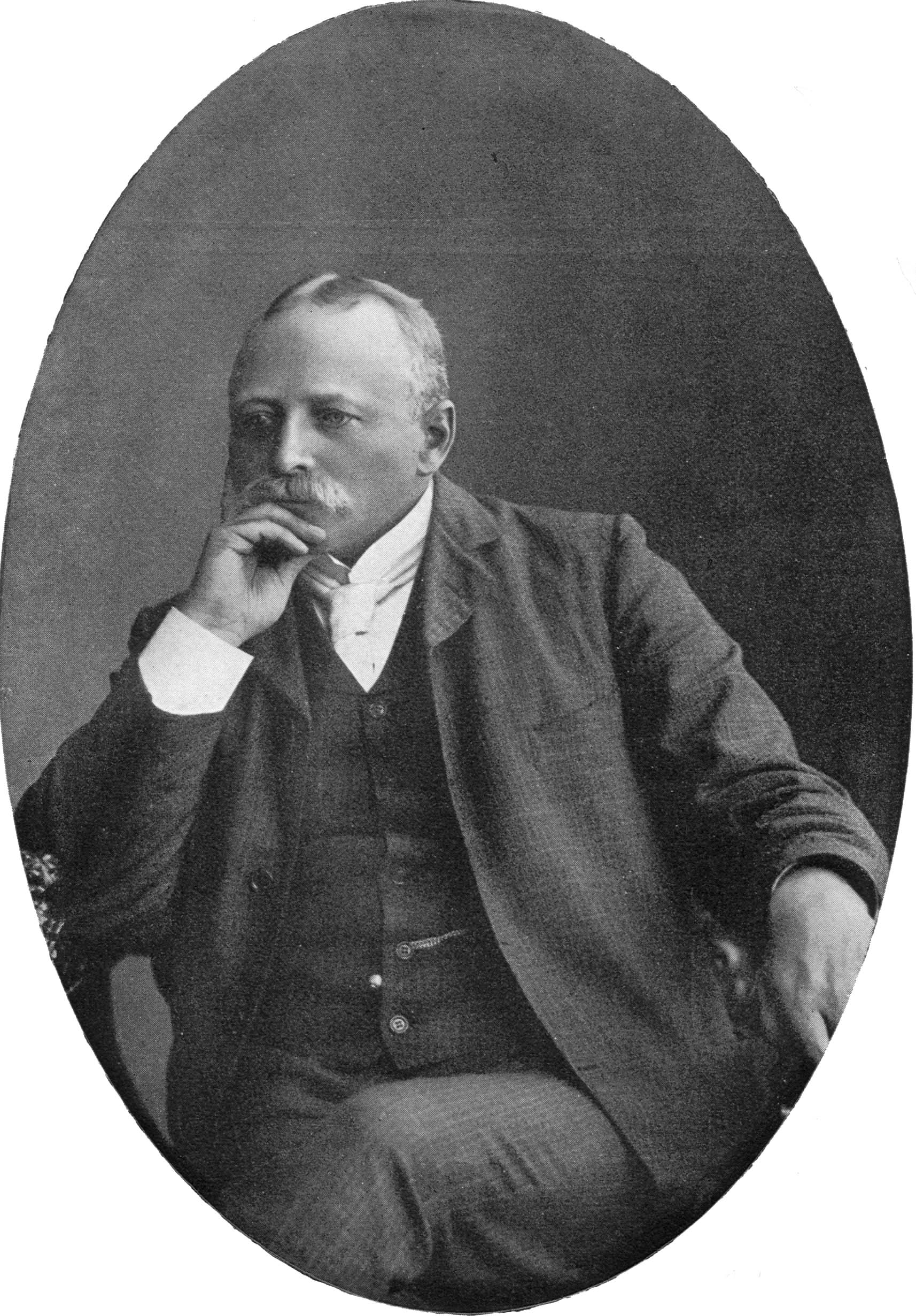
Hans Larsson c. 1910.

Hans Larsson (18 February 1862 in Östra Klagstorp, Malmöhus län – 16 February 1944, Lund) was a Swedish Professor of Philosophy at Lund University, Sweden and a Member of the Swedish Academy (1925-1944), chair no. 15. He was known in Sweden as Kloke-Hans ("Clever Hans").

Prof. Larsson was a humanist and an author. He was also a mentor for several Swedish authors and a prominent essayist.

== Biography ==
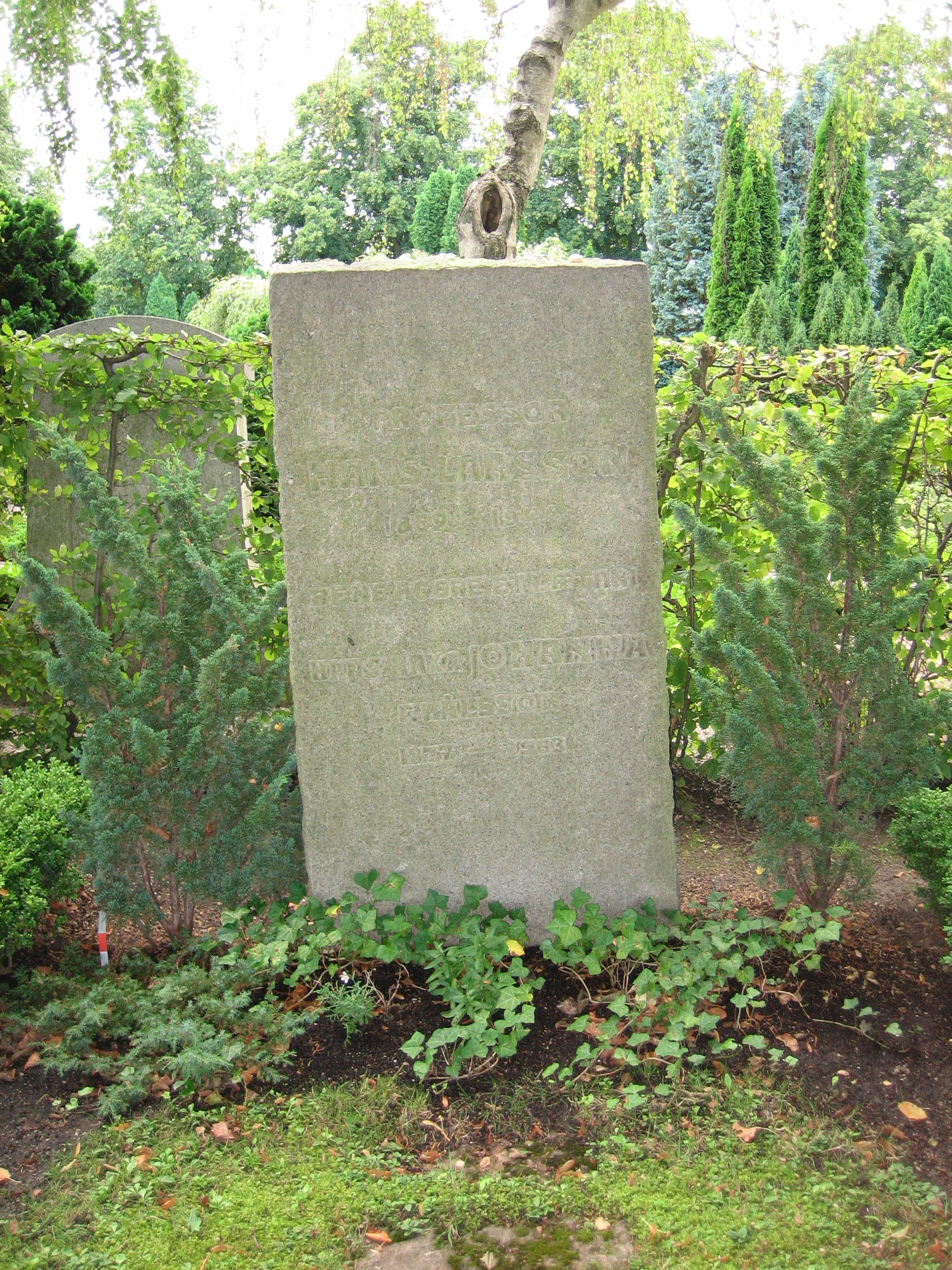
Hans Larsson's tombstone on Norra kyrkogården i Lund

Prof. Larsson was the son of the farmer Lars Persson and Kersti Nilsdotter, and cousin of author Ola Hansson. After studentexamen in 1881 he began his studies at Lund University. He received his Bachelor of Arts in 1888. In 1893 he received the titles Licentiate of Philosophy, Doctor of Philosophy and Docent in Theoretical Philosophy with a doctoral dissertation entitled Kants transcendentala deduktion af kategorierna ("The transcendental deduction of categories in Kant").

In 1884 he taught at the Folk high school in Kronobergs län. In 1899-1901 he taught at Uppsala Högre Allmänna Läroverk after having gained the docent title of theoretical philosophy at Uppsala University. In 1901 he became a Professor of Theoretical Philosophy at Lund University, a position he remained in until he became an emeritus in 1927. Two years before his retirement he was elected a Member of the Swedish Academy.

In 1905 he married Johanna Pålsson. Prof. Larsson is buried on Norra kyrkogården in Lund.

== Bibliography ==
- Intuition 1892
- Kants transscendentala deduktion af kategorierna 1893
- Lärobok i psykologi på empirisk grund 1896
- Enkla och sammansatta stämningar i dikten 1898
- Studier och meditationer 1899
- Poesiens logik 1899
- Viljans frihet 1899
- Gränsen mellan sensation och emotion 1899
- Sveriges historia i dess sammanhang med Norges och Danmarks jämte notiser ur världshistorien 1903
- Idéer och makter 1908
- Om bildning och självstudier 1908
- Kunskapslivet 1909
- På vandring 1909
- Rousseau och Pestalozzi i våra dagars pedagogiska brytningar 1910
- Reflexioner för dagen 1911
- Intuitionsproblemet 1912
- Evighetsfilosofien i Platons Faidon 1912
- Platon och vår tid 1913
- Logik 1914
- Vänstersynpunkter 1914
- Dagens frågor 1914
- Filosofien och politiken 1915
- Hemmabyarna 1916
- Athena 1917
- Nationalitetsprincipens eventuella tillämpning vid det blivande fredsslutet 1917
- Idéerna i Stabberup 1918
- Under världskrisen 1920
- Den intellektuella åskådningens filosofi 1920
- Den grekiska filosofien 1921
- Skolformer och skolkurser 1922
- Filosofiska uppsatser 1924
- Per Ståstdräng och de andra 1924
- Filosofiens historia i korta drag 1924
- Etisk diskussion 1925
- Litteraturintryck 1926
- Minne av Gottfrid Billing 1926
- Minnesteckning över Christopher Jacob Broström 1930
- Om själen 1930
- Spinoza 1931
- Gemenskap 1932
- Minimum 1935
- Emilia Fogelklou 1935
- Per Axel Samuel Herrlin 1938
- Postscriptum 1944
- Nilsson, Signe: Bidrag till en Bibliografi över Professor Hans Larssons Skrifter. In: Festskrift tillägned Hans Larsson, Stockholm 1927

== Awards ==
- De Nios stora pris (1920).

Cultural offices
Preceded by Gottfrid Billing	Swedish Academy, Seat No.15; 1925–1944	Succeeded by Elin Wägner
