= Stig Dalager =

Danish writer

Stig Dalager (born 1952) is a Danish writer. He is the author of 65 literary works of all kinds, mostly novels and plays, of which several have been translated or staged internationally.

== Biography ==
Dalager was born in Copenhagen, Denmark, in the post-war period of the 1950s, a time of painful remembrances of the Second World War, continued economic restrictions, and a growing optimism about the future. His parents were grocers throughout the 1950s and 1960s, until his father was struck by Parkinson's disease. Dalager describes his radically changing family structure as he and his two younger brothers moved with their parents to the provincial town of Herning in Jutland, near to where his father had been raised. There Dalager graduated from high school, after which he attended the University of Århus, where he received his master's degree and a Ph.D. in comparative literature. It was also there that he became involved in the student movement of the 1970s. With his then fiancée, Anne Marie Mai, he wrote several books on literature, including a two-volume study of Danish women writers from the Middle Ages to contemporary times, Danske kvindelige forfattere 1-2.

In 1982, Dalager left the University of Copenhagen to live as a writer, which he has continued to do since. He has written poetry, fiction (prose), drama, filmscripts and essays. Several of his poems and novels have been translated into other languages, and he has seen his plays staged in Moscow, New York City, Berlin, and other cities.

The poetry cycle Århus-elegi (Aarhus eulogy) of 1986 was his poetic breakthrough. His most recent collection, Den tynde væg (The Thin Wall), was published in 2016.

Three of his latest prose-works were the novels Journey in Blue (about H.C. Andersen) published in 2004 (English 2006), The Labyrinth in 2006 and Land of shadows (about 9/11 in New York) in 2007. Dalager's 2017 novel Kvinde i et århundrede ("Woman in a Century") about the Elisabeth of the Palatinate, and his 2020 Kaos og verden ("Chaos and the World") about Trump's America and AI are his most recent to have been published.

== Prose ==
- Hærværksforeningen og andre noveller, 1980
- Bergomi, novel, 1984
- Jon, novel, 1986
- Glemsel og erindring, novel, 1992.
- Davids bog (David's Book), novel, 1995. (translated into Russian, Polish, English and more)
- Fanget (Trapped), detective novel, 1998.
- Tilfældige forbindelser (Casual relations), stories, 1998.
- En dukkes histories (A Doll's Story), stories for children, 2000.
- Øvelser i ensomhed (Exercises in Loneliness), novel, 2000.
- To dage i july (Two Days in July), novel, 2002, (translated into 5 languages)
- Opgøret med det entydige, essays, 2002.
- Tilfældige forbindelser ("Casual relations"), prose trilogy, 2002–03.
- Rejse i blåt (Journey in Blue), novel, 2004.
- Labyrinten (The Labyrinth), novel, 2005.
- Land of Shadows, novel, 2007.
- Slowly Comes the light, novel, 2009
- The Long Day, novel, 2011
- The Blue Light, novel, 2012
- Eternity of the Moment, novel, 2013
- Journey without End, novel, 2015
- Woman in a Century, novel, 2017
- The last days of the Rabby, tale, 2017
- Kaos og verden (Chaos and The World), novel 2020
- En verden af forbindelser (A world of relations), a prose trilogy, 2022

== Plays ==
- Monolog for ung mand (Monologue for a Young Man), radio play/ monologue, 1982
- En aften i Hamburg (An Evening in Hamburg), play 1983–85
- Nat i Venedig (Night in Venice), play, 1987, trans. Washington D.C., 1992
- Nat med sne og kærlighed (Night With Snow and Love), radio play, 1987
- Morgen i Århus (Morning in Aarhus), radio play, 1988
- Mesteren og Margarita (The Master and Margarita), play, 1991
- Herre og skygge (Lord and Shadow), play, 1992, trans. (staged in Washington D.C., Copenhagen, Moscow, Rio de Janeiro, Beijing, Sofia and more)
- En historie om forræderi (A Story About Treason), play, 1992.
- Jeg tæller timerne (I Count the Hours), monologue, (staged in New York City, Berlin, Vienna, Copenhagen and other cities)
- Længsler og skygger, play, 1995.
- Drømmen (The Dream), play, trans. 1999. (New York, Moscow, Łódź, Copenhagen and other cities)
- En halv times kærlighed (A Half Hour Love), play, 2001.
- Ansigter (Faces), dia-monologue for an Israeli and Palestinian woman, New York, Copenhagen, 2005.
- Family Night, play, 2005 (stage reading premiere in New York 2006 )
- American Elektra, play, premiere in Beijing and Copenhagen 2007.
- Evening Light, play, 2012
- Journey in Light and Shadow, play, 2017 (world premiere in New York 2017)
- Hammarskjöld, monologue about Dag Hammarskjöld, world premiere in Copenhagen, May 2022, and in New York 2023

=== Filmscripts ===
- I fremmed havn (In a Foreign Harbour) film, 1990
- Ved havet (At the Sea), TV film, 1991
- Møde i natten,(Meeting in the Night) TV film, 1991
- Mørke og forsoning, documentary film from the West Bank and Israel, 2003 (Darkness and Reconciliation)
- "Land of shadows", script for film adaptation of Land of shadows (2020)
- "Journey in Blue", script for film adaptation of Journey in Blue (2020)

=== Libretti ===
- Kærlighed og forræderi, opera libretto for Niels Marthinsen, 1997.

== Poetry collections ==
- Opløsningstiden (Denmark: Arkona, 1982)
- Lindholmen station (Valby, Denmark: Helka, 1985)
- Provinsidyl [with Peter Nielsen] (Valby, Denmark: Borgen, 1986)
- Århus-elegi (Valby, Denmark: Borgen, 1986)
- Vinter (Viby, Denmark: Centrum, 1987)
- Ansigt og årstid (Valby, Denmark: Borgen, 1988)
- Hjernen er en rød station (Copenhagen: Brøndum, 1989)
- Floden under huset (Valby, Denmark: Borgen, 1992)
- Wienerdage (Valby, Denmark: Borgen, 1994)
- Og du skal vågne igen (Copenhagen: Per Kofod, 1996)
- Himlen åbner sig (Copenhagen: Tiderne Skifter, 2000).
- Ildfluerne danser, 2012 (Århus EC Edition)
- Den tynde væg, 2016 (Århus EC Edition)

== Essays ==
- Opgøret med det entydige. Essays and articles, 2000
- Ansøgning om at være menneske. Essays and articles, 2009
- Nedtælling for humanismen. Essays and articles, 2018
