= John Landquist =

Swedish literary scholar (1881–1974)

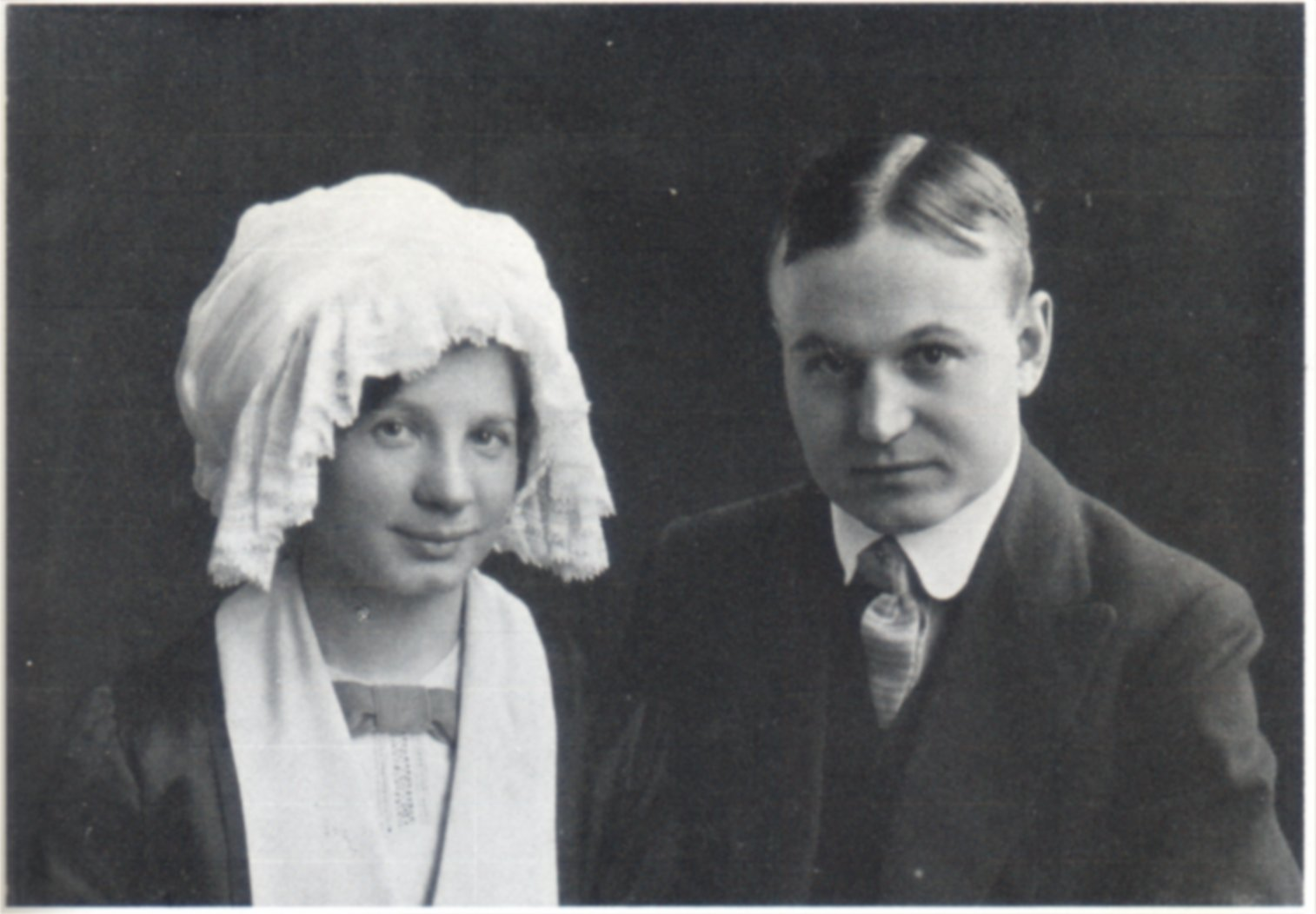
John Landquist with his 1st wife Elin Wägner.

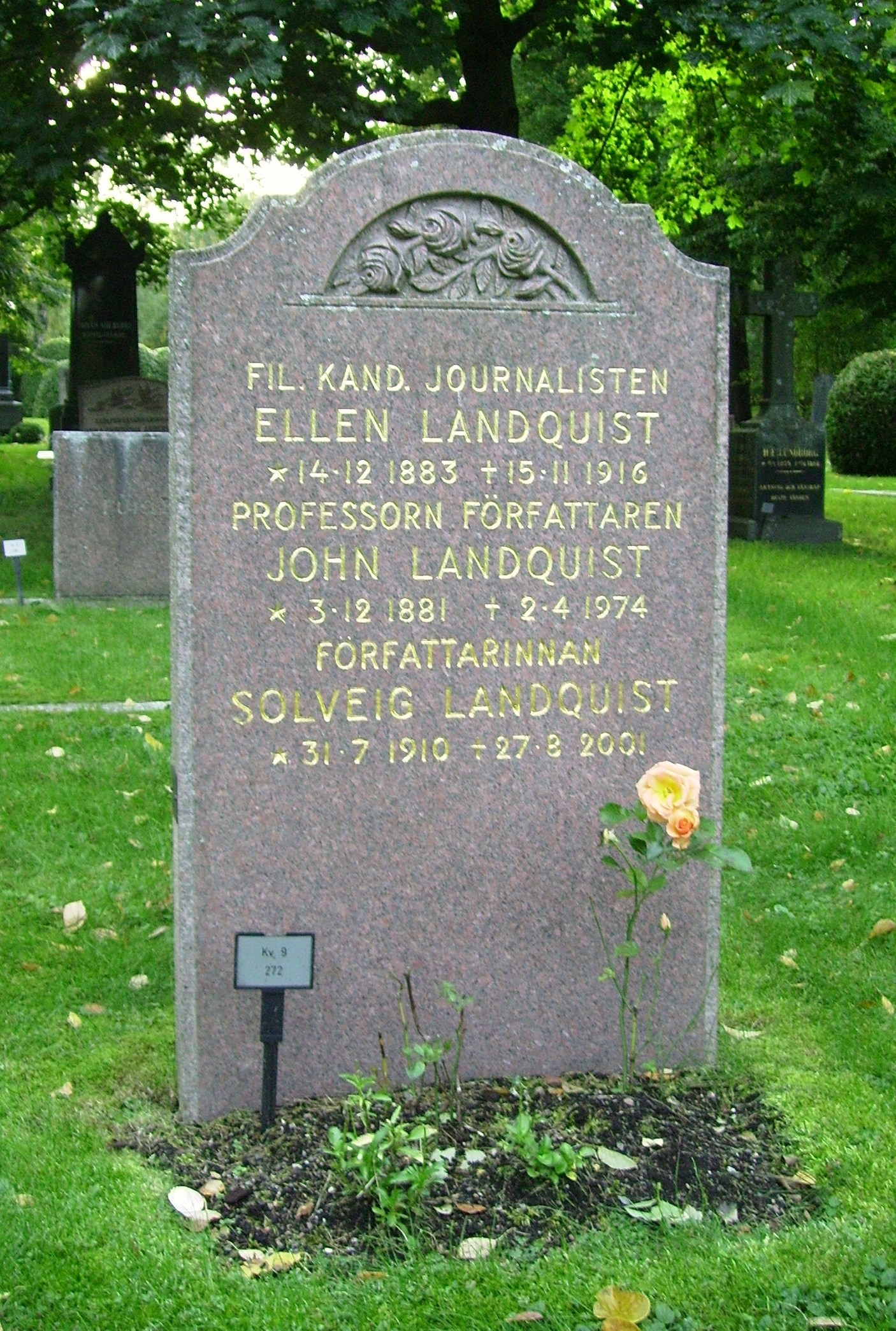
John Landquist's gravestone at Norra begravningsplatsen in Solna.

John Landquist (3 December 1881 in Stockholm – 2 April 1974 in Danderyd) was a Swedish literary critic, literary scholar, writer and professor of pedagogy and psychology at Lund University from 1936 to 1946.

When Landquist studied at Uppsala University, he was a member of the student organization Les quatre diables together with Sven Lidman, Sigurd Agrell and Harald Brising. Landquist was engaged in Strindbergsfejden and released August Strindberg's works. In 1916 he wrote a monograph on Gustaf Fröding and was ready to introduce Sigmund Freud's theory of manners into Swedish literary history. He also translated Freud's works into Swedish.

Landquist was married to Elin Wägner from 1910 to 1922 and later, from 1938, to Solveig Landquist.

Landquist's critical review of the 1946 book Pippi Långstrump was the beginning of a newspaper debate where people protested against Astrid Lindgren's manner of writing children's books.

In 1971 Landquist received "De Nios Stora Pris".

== Selected bibliography ==
- 1906 – Filosofiska essayer (philosophy)
- 1908 – Viljan : en psykologisk-etisk undersökning (philosophy)
- 1909 – Verner von Heidenstam : en essay (history of literature)
- 1913 – Essayer : ny samling (history of literature)
- 1916 – Gustaf Fröding : en psykologisk och litteraturhistorisk studie (history of literature)
- 1917 – Knut Hamsun : En studie över en nordisk romantisk diktare (history of literature)
- 1920 – Människokunskap : en studie över den historiska och den konstnärliga kunskapen (knowledge theory)
- 1924 – Erik Gustav Geijer : hans levnad och verk (history of literature)
- 1927 – Erik Hedén : En levnadsteckning (biography)
- 1928 – Henri Bergson : en populär framställning av hans filosofi (history of philosophy)
- 1929 – Modern svensk litteratur i Finland (history of literature)
- 1929 – Uppsalafilosofien och sanningen : några ord om två sakkunniga för tillsättandet av filosofiprofessuren i Lund (philosophy)
- 1931 – Humanism : inlägg (history of literature)
- 1935 – Till humanistiska sektionen vid Lunds universitet
- 1935 – Själens enhet / tre föreläsningar (psychology)
- 1940 – Psykologi
- 1941 – Pedagogikens historia
- 1944 – Efter fyllda fyrtio år (psychology)
- 1949 – Som jag minns dem (biography and history of literature)
- 1952 – Våra fördomar
- 1954 – Geijer: en levnadsteckning (biography)
- 1957 – I ungdomen : scener ur den förlorade tiden (history of literature)
- 1959 – Charles Darwin : liv och verk (biography)
- 1964 – Poul Bjerre : själsläkaren och konstnären (biography)
- 1965 – Livet i Katarina (geography and church history)
- 1970 – Tankar om den skapande individen (history of literature and psychology)

== References and sources ==
- John Landquist
- Stora John, lilla Lankan
