= Annakarin Svedberg =

Swedish author (born 1934)

Gunnel Annakarin Svedberg (born 1934) is a Swedish writer. Common themes in her works include women's issues, lesbianism and feminist politics.

== Career ==
Svedberg was born in 1934 in Halmstad, and moved to Malmö with her family in 1941.

Svedberg's first novel, Vårvinterdagbok (translated as Late Winter Diary or Journal of Early Spring), was published in 1957. The book was well received, and one critic wrote: "The promise in Annakarin Svedberg's book above all lies in the linguistic purity of her wit, which sparkles like the late winter sun through her window, in the grace of her phrases, in the exquisite taste she demonstrates in every passage." She published her second novel, Ack, denna själ! (Yea, this soul!) in 1958.

In 1962, Svedberg published Vingklippta (Wing-clipped), her third novel and her first piece of writing about lesbianism. The book, which presents a positive depiction of a lesbian relationship, was considered a Beat novel and drew comparisons to Jack Kerouac, Jackson Pollock, Henry Miller and Selma Lagerlöf. She followed Vingklippta with three more novels about lesbians: Det goda livet (1963; The Good Life), Se uppför trollen! eller: Äntligen en bok om livet sådant det verkligen är (1963; Watch out for the Trolls! or: Finally a Book on Life as It Is), and Din egen (1966; Your Own). Svedberg depicted homosexuality as no different from heterosexuality, although her lesbian characters often faced prejudice and injustice. Literary critic Jenny Björklund wrote in Lesbianism in Swedish Literature: An Ambiguous Affair that Svedberg's writings "contribute[d] to opening up discursive space for a more tolerant attitude to lesbianism".

In the 1960s Svedberg also authored a famous short story, a pornographic parody of Little Red Riding Hood. She published Kärlek är det innersta av hjärtat (Love is the Core of the Heart), a book in the form of a diary, in 1976. Two years later, she wrote En enda jord, an academic book about religious values held by different cultures. Her work gradually became more political and focused on feminist ideas, and she was a contributor to the radical feminist magazine Kvinnobulletinen. In 1985 she helped to found Kvinnopartiet (The Women's Party), a short-lived radical feminist political party in Sweden. She self-published the book Sex Kristalliska Berättelser in 1994, and since the late 1990s has written numerous books about travel and spirituality.

== Personal life ==
Svedberg has two children with Frank Scott, a singer from the United States with whom she lived in the late 1950s.

== Selected works ==
- Vårvinterdagbok 1957
- Ack, denna själ! 1958
- Vingklippta 1962
- Det goda livet 1963
- Se upp för trollen! 1963
- Din egen 1966
- Sagor vid kanten av ingenting 1975
- Kärlek är det innersta av hjärtat 1976
- En enda jord 1978
- Indira Gandhi-en bok om kärlek 1980
- Sex kristalliska berättelser 1994
- Högplatåns guld 2001
- Drakflygarna 2002
- Mot källan 2002
- Fem drömska sagor 2003
- Veo ad Gax från yttre rymden 2004
