= Kjell Espmark =

Swedish writer (1930–2022)

- Born: 19 February 1930; Strömsund, Sweden
- Died: 18 September 2022 (aged 92)
- Occupations: literary historian, author
- Employer(s): Stockholm University; Östra Real
- Spouses: Anna Espmark (m. 1959–2000); Monica Lauritzen (m. 2009)
- Children: 2

Member of the Swedish Academy (Seat No. 16)
- In office 20 December 1981 – 18 September 2022
- Preceded by: Elias Wessén
- Succeeded by: Anna-Karin Palm

Kjell Erik Espmark (19 February 1930 – 18 September 2022) was a Swedish writer, literary historian, member of the Swedish Academy, and Professor of the History of Literature at Stockholm University. He was elected to the Swedish Academy on 5 March 1981 and admitted on 20 December 1981. Kjell Espmark succeeded the linguist Elias Wessén to Seat No.16. He was chair of the Swedish Academy's Nobel committee between 1987 and 2004.

On 6 April 2018 Espmark announced that he would no longer participate in the work of the Academy, but returned to his seat in January 2019.

== Works ==
As a literature historian Espmark specialised in poetic modernism, including studies about the work of Swedish poets Artur Lundkvist, Harry Martinson, Tomas Tranströmer, and Att översätta själen: en huvudlinje i modern poesi – från Baudelaire till surrealismen ("To translate the soul: a main line in modern poetry from Baudelaire to surrealism", 1975). Also a prolific fiction writer, Espmark published a number of poetry collections since his debut in 1956, and later extended his writing to several prose works and plays. His work also include essay collections and studies about the Nobel Prize in Literature. In 2010, his autobiography Minnena ljuger ("Memories Lie") was published.

== Bibliography ==
- Mordet på Benjamin (1956)
- Världen genom kameraögat (1958)
- Mikrokosmos (1961)
- Livsdyrkaren Artur Lundkvist : studier i hans lyrik till och med Vit man (1964)
- Det offentliga samtalet (1968)
- Harry Martinson erövrar sitt språk : en studie i hans lyriska metod 1927-1934 (1970)
- Samtal under jorden (1972)
- Det obevekliga paradiset (1975)
- Att översätta själen : en huvudlinje i modern poesi – från Baudelaire till surrealismen (1975)
- Sent i Sverige (1976)
- Själen i bild : en huvudlinje i modern svensk poesi (1977)
- Försök till liv (1979)
- Elias Wessén : inträdestal i Svenska akademien (1981)
- Tecken till Europa (1982)
- Resans formler: en studie i Tomas Tranströmers poesi (1983)
- Den hemliga måltiden (1984)
- Dialoger (1985)
- Glömskan (1987)
- Missförståndet (1989)
- Föraktet (1991)
- När vägen vänder (1992)
- Lojaliteten (1993)
- Hatet (1995)
- Revanschen (1996)
- Glädjen (1997)
- Det andra livet (1998)
- Glömskans tid (1999)
- De levande har inga gravar (2002)
- Utanför kalendern (2003)
- Béla Bartók mot Tredje riket (2004)
- Harry Martinson – mästaren (2005)
- Motvilliga historier (2006)
- Vintergata (2007)
- Albatrossen på däcket (2008)
- Det enda nödvändiga : dikter 1956-2009 (2010)
- Marx i London och andra pjäser (2011)
- Lend Me Your Voice (2011), poetry, English translation by Robin Fulton
- I vargtimmen (2012)
- Outside the Calendar (2012), poetry, English translation by Robin Fulton
- Hoffmanns försvar (2013)
- Den inre rymden (2014)
- Resan till Thule (2017)
- Kvällens frihet (2019)
- Återliv (2021)

Cultural offices
Preceded by Elias Wessén	Swedish Academy, Seat No.16; 1981–2022	Succeeded by vacant
