= Stina Aronson =

Swedish writer

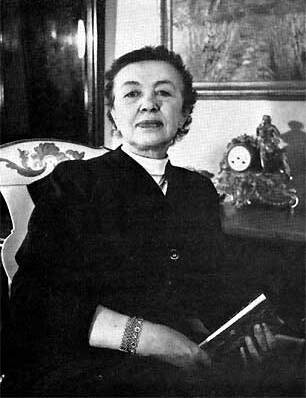
- Stina Aronson
- Born: Ester Kristina Andersson; 26 December 1892; Uppsala, Sweden
- Died: 24 November 1956 (aged 63); Uppsala, Sweden
- Occupations: writer, schoolteacher
- Writing career
- Language: Swedish
- Period: 1921–52

Ester Kristina "Stina" Aronson (1892–1956) was a Swedish writer. Considered a modernist, she gained fame with her novel Hitom himlen (This Side of Heaven) (1946) in which she portrayed women farmers in the north of Sweden.

== Bibliography ==
- En bok om goda grannar, 1921 ISBN 1-142-53009-4
- Slumpens myndling, 1922
- Jag ger vika, 1923
- Två herrar blev nöjda, 1928 pseudonym Sara Sand
- Fabeln om Valentin, 1929 pseudonym Sara Sand
- Tolv hav, 1930 pseudonym Sara Sand
- Syskonbädd, 1931 pseudonym Sara Sand
- Feberboken, 1931 pseudonym Mimmi Palm
- Medaljen över Jenny, 1935
- Byar under fjäll, 1937
- Gossen på tröskeln, 1942
- Hitom himlen, 1946
- Sång till polstjärnan, 1948
- Kantele, 1949
- Två skådespel, 1949
- Dockdans, 1949
- Den fjärde vägen, 1950
- Sanningslandet, 1952
- Den röda gåvan och andra noveller, 1967
