= Åsa Beckman =

Swedish literary critic

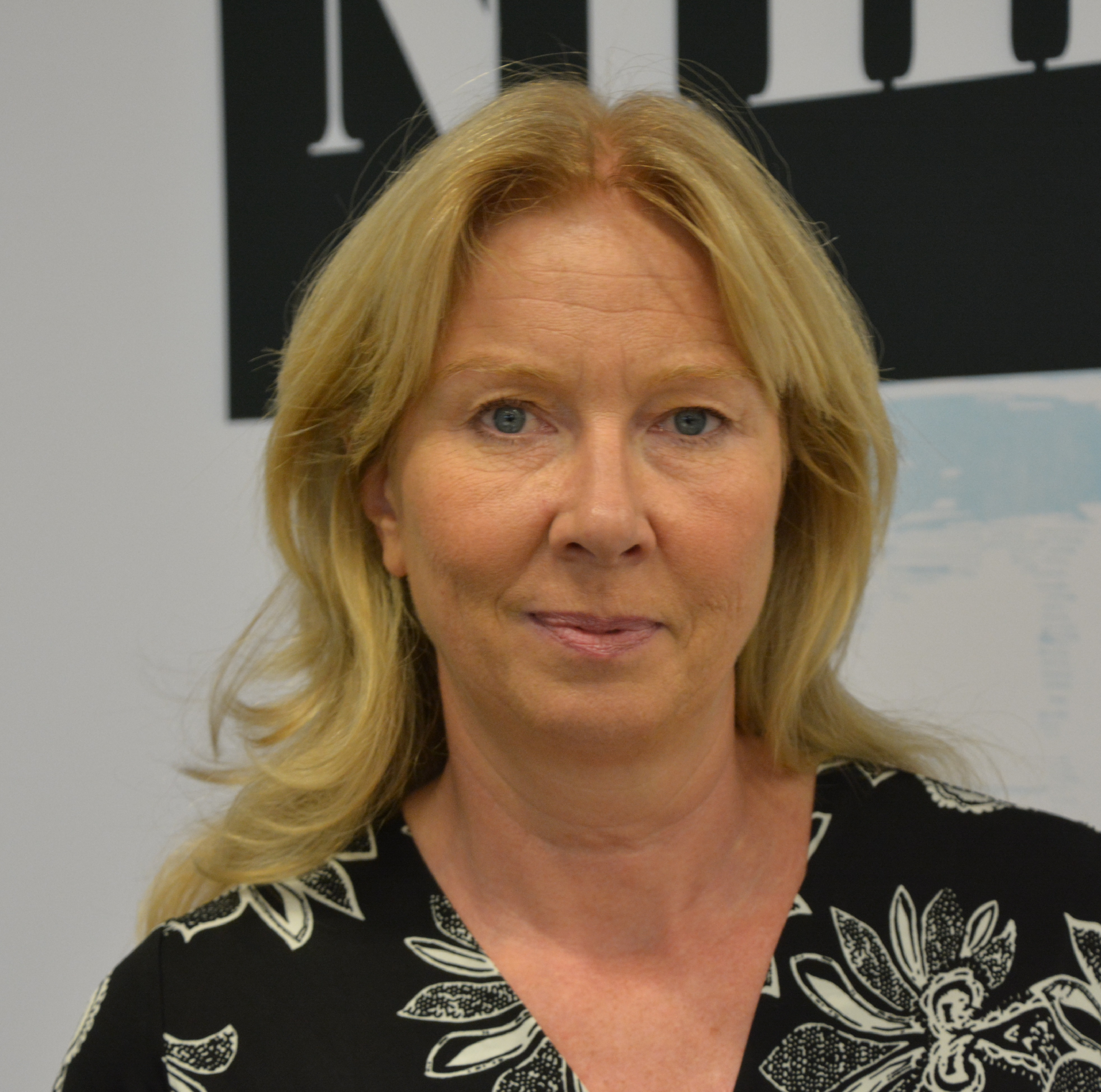
Åsa Beckman

Åsa Beckman (born 1961) is a Swedish literary critic. She writes for the Swedish newspaper Dagens Nyheter and was editor of the literary magazine Bonniers Litterära Magasin from 1987 to 1990.

== Works ==
- Jag själv ett hus av ljus, Albert Bonniers förlag 2002

== Awards ==
- Gerard Bonniers essäpris (essay award), 2003
