= Nabil Naoum =

Egyptian writer

- Born: 1944, Cairo
- Education: Cairo University
- Occupations: Writer, critic
- Children: Mariam Naoum
- Writing career
- Language: Arabic, English, French
- Notable works: Al-bab (The door), novel in Arabic, Cairo, 1977 "الباب" Hafat el wed (The Edge of loving), novel in Arabic, Kossour al-Thakafa, Cairo, 2000 "حافة الود"

Nabil Naoum is an Egyptian writer and critic. He was born in Cairo, in 1944. He studied engineering in Cairo University and then went to the United States, where he worked as an engineer in New York City for ten years. In 1979 he returned to Cairo, where he opened a gallery for modern art and turned more seriously towards writing. Since 2000, Naoum has been a member of the selection committee of the Biennale for Arabic Film at the Arab World Institute in Paris. he was married to Suzanne El Masry and his daughter is the famous screenwriter Mariam Naoum.

== Life and career ==
Nabil Naoum was born in Cairo, 1944. He studied engineering in Cairo University and then went to the United States, where he worked as an engineer in New York City for ten years. During this time he wrote his first short stories, some of which were published in Egyptian literary magazines. In 1977 his first novel, 'Al-bâb' (Engl: The Door) came out, in Egypt. In 1979 he returned to Cairo, where he opened a gallery for modern art and turned more seriously towards writing. In the 1980s he published a series of short story collections, among them is the French-Arabic volume 'Le Caire est petit' (1985; Engl: Cairo is Small). Furthermore, a collection of twenty stories came out in English translation under the title The Slave's Dream and Other Stories (1991). In addition to his prose, Nabil Naoum has published several essays on contemporary Arab art and photography. Since 2000, he has been a member of the selection committee of the Biennale for Arabic Film at the Arab World Institute in Paris. Nabil Naoum has lived in Cairo and Paris since 1993.

== Personal life ==
He was married to Suzanne El Masry and his daughter is the famous screenwriter Mariam Naoum.

== Works ==
- Al-bab (The door), novel in Arabic, Cairo, 1977 "الباب"
- Ashiq al-muhaddith (Ashiq the storyteller), collection of short stories in Arabic, Dar Shouhdi, Cairo, 1984 "عاشق المحدث"
- Al-qamar fi ektimal (The moon becomes full), collection of short stories in Arabic, Dar Sharqyat, Cairo, 1993 "القمر في اكتمال"
- Al awda ila l-mabad (return to the temple), novel in Arabic, Dar al Adab, Beirut, 1994 "العودة إلى المعبد"
- Tarawat al-ain (the way to the tomb), collection of short stories in Arabic, Kossour al-Thakafa, Cairo, 1997 "طراوة العين"
- Jasad Awal (body first), novel in Arabic, Dar al Hilal, Cairo, 1998 "جسد أول"
- Hafat el wed (The Edge of loving), novel in Arabic, Kossour al-Thakafa, Cairo, 2000 "حافة الود"
- Almalika Tot (La Reine Tot), novel in Arabic, Dar Merit, Cairo, 2010 "الملكة توت"
- Nisf Sadr ( Half breast ), novel in Arabic, Dar Alkotob Khan), Cairo, 2015 "نصف صدر"
- Thagharat Al Zakirah (Gaps in memory), collection of short stories in Arabic, Kossour al-Thakafa, Cairo, 2018 "ثغرات الذاكرة"
- Tamsheet Al Zakirah (Paigne the memory), collection of short stories in Arabic, Dar al-Thaqafa Al Gadidah, 2019 "تمشيط الذاكرة"

== See also ==
- Yusuf Abu Rayya
- Hala el Badry
- Sonallah Ibrahim
