= Arild Hestvik =

Norwegian psychologist

Arild Hestvik (born 1960 in Trondheim, Norway) is a researcher in theoretical linguistics and experimental psychology.

Holding a Ph.D, obtained from Brandeis University in 1990, he is a professor at the University of Delaware, United States.

He has published several articles on Binding Theory and its relation to ellipsis, and the cognitive neuroscience of language processing.

Arild Hestvik is a specialist in using electroencephalographic (EEG) measures of brain activity in language experiments, studying both normal and language impaired populations.
