= K. G. Ossiannilsson =

Swedish author and translator

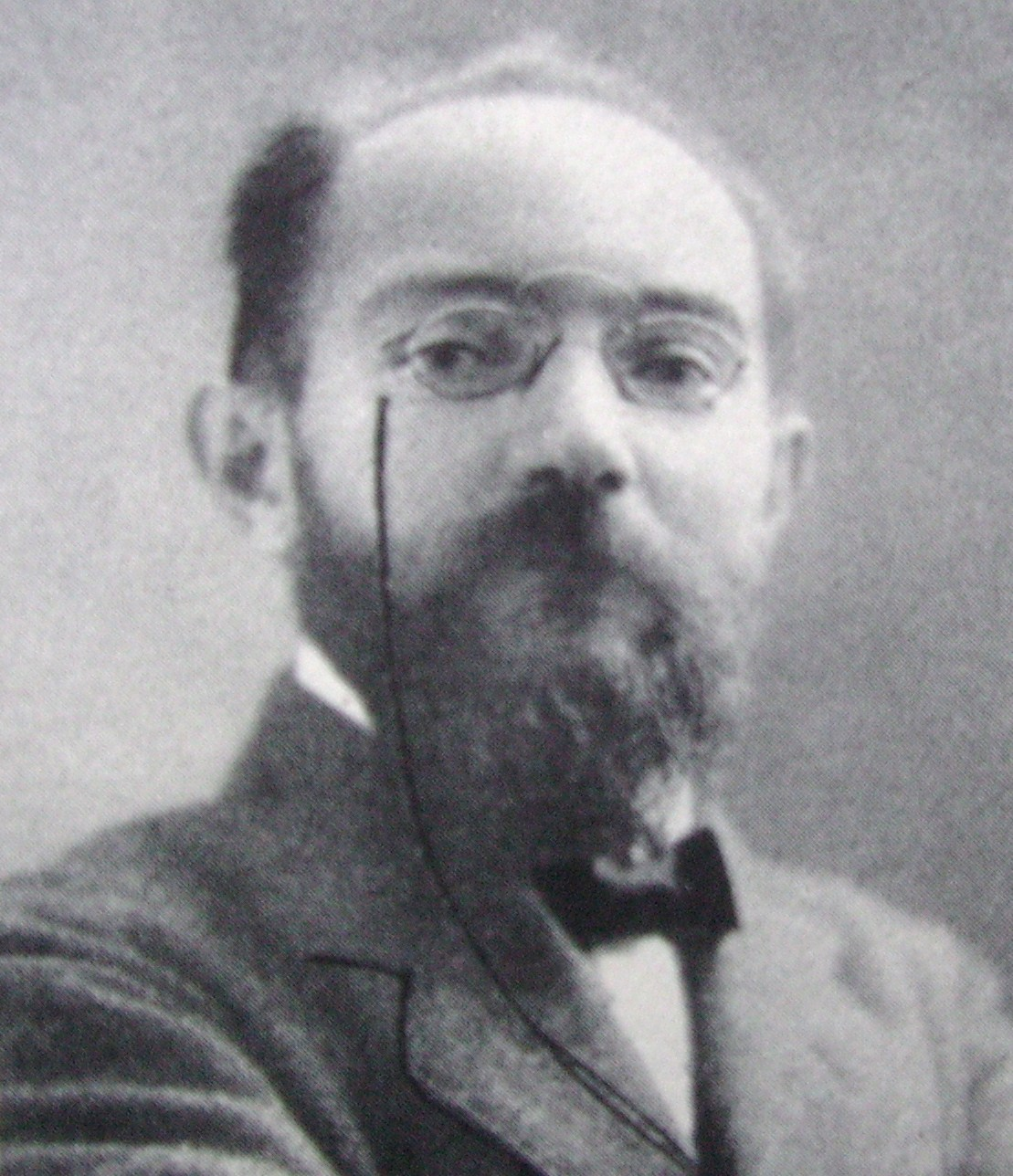
K. G. Ossiannilsson

Karl Gustav Ossiannilsson (originally Karl Gustav Ossian Nilsson, July 30, 1875 – March 14, 1970) was a Swedish author and translator.

== Biography ==
Ossiannilsson studied at Lund University between 1894 and 1897, and thereafter he worked as a private tutor and as a teacher in private schools for a few years. Although his first book appeared in 1895, Ossiannilsson became known to a broader public during the years 1900 to 1901, when he published three collections of poetry: Fem dikter, Masker, and Hedningar.

In his early days Ossiannilsson was a Social Democrat, but he gradually drifted towards other views. In 1928 he joined the right-wing and pro-Nazi party National League of Sweden. He remained a member until the beginning of World War II and when he left he wrote an anti-Nazi poem "Till en förtryckare" ("To an oppressor").

Ossiannilsson wrote numerous novels, books of poetry, plays, essays, and pamphlets, as well as a couple of screenplays.
