= Albert Viksten =

Swedish writer

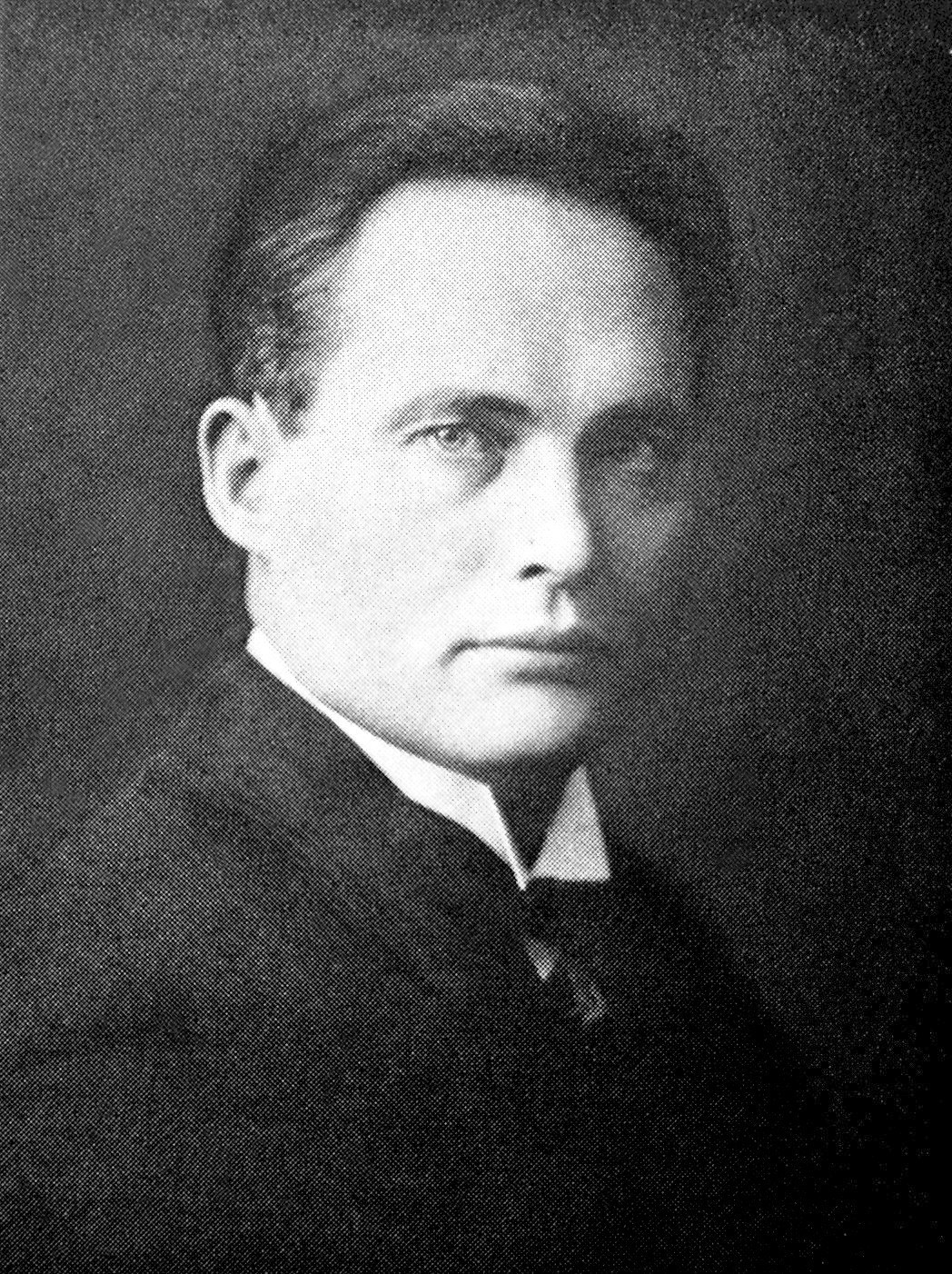
Albert Viksten

Albert Viksten (born 8 April 1889 in Vojen, Grangärde parish, Västernorrland, Sweden) was a Swedish writer of the proletarian school. He is most notable for his work regarding the life of the people working for the Swedish forest industry and for his portraits of nature. He was also an early debater of the consequences of the human industry on the environment. Viksten worked in the forest and railway industry and as a sailor before he became a journalist and writer. Albert was married to Lisa Viksten (formerly Brolin) and had 4 children, Sven, Hans, Karin and Marta.

He died on 23 June 1969 in Färila, Gävleborg, Sweden. He received Samfundet De Nios Grand Prize posthumously in 1969.

== Works ==
- Striden för livet: berättelser från Norrlands skogar, 1917
- Bortom lagen (1919)
- Bland björnskyttar och sälfångare i Norra Ishavet, 1921
- Bäverbäcken (1923)
- Stor-Nils (1923)
- Byfolket (1925)
- Hårda män: dikter (1926)
- Idyll och florett: dikter (1927)
- Pirater och pälsjägare (1927)
- Timmer (1929)
- Ödets väg (1930)
- En hustru på avbetalning: pjäs i 2 akter (1931)
- Den vita vidden (1931)
- Vargen (1932)
- Skogen sjunger: dikter (1933)
- Storbamsen: en fäbodfärd för 100 år sedan: folkspel i en akt (1934)
- Hälsingland: några upplysningar i ord och bild, utg. av Hälsinglands turistförening (1934)
- Byns ögon (1934)
- Storm över niporna (1935)
- Spelet under skyarna (1936)
- Skepparn, styrman och tungmatrosen : en sannfärdig beskrivning av de märkvärdiga händelser och äventyr, vilka tilldrogo sig ombord på östersjöfararen Carmen vid densamma skutas segling från Böda till Oxelösund (1937)
- Guds eget land (1938)
- Vilda vägar västerut (1938)
- Brandsyn (1941)
- Äventyr i Norra Ishavet (1942)
- Porten mot havet (1943)
- Vägen hem (1945)
- Eld och bröd (1948)
- Kavalkad: dikter (1949)
- Blå gryning (1950)
- I guldjägares spår : resan till Yukon och Alaska (1951)
- Den stora kärleken, med teckningar av Eric Palmquist (1952)
- Vindkantring (1953)
- De sökte nytt land (1953)
- Pälsjägarnas paradis (1956)
- Tankar vid en dödsdömd sjö (1956)
- Drama i norr (1957)
- Mitt paradis (1959)
- Nybyggare i Barbarskogen (1961)
- Till min flicka: dagbok från Ishavet (1968)
- Mitt liv, ett äventyr: Sammanställning och förord av Sven Viksten (1971)
