= Marie Lundquist =

Swedish author, cultural journalist and translator

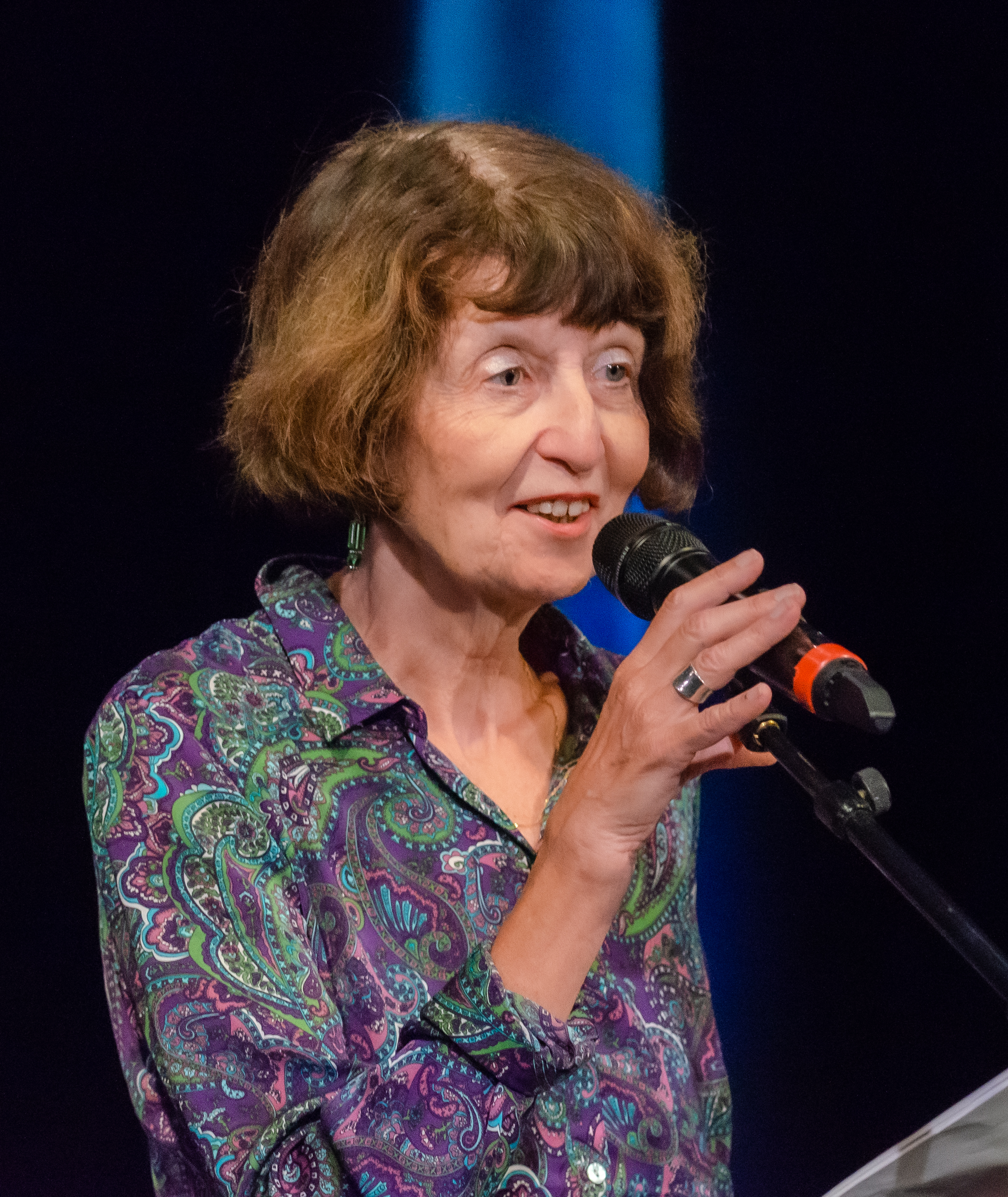
- Occupation: Journalist, university teacher, translator

Marie Lundquist (born 1950) is a Swedish author, cultural journalist and translator. She is a former high school teacher at Biskops-Arnö.

== Bibliography ==
- 1992 – Jag går runt och samlar in min trädgård för natten
- 1993 – Brev till de sovande
- 1995 – Astrakanerna
- 1997 – Istället för minne
- 1999 – En fabel skriven på stenar
- 2002 – En enkel berättelse
- 2005 – Monolog för en ensam kvinna
- 2007 – Drömmen om verkligheten – fotografiska reflektioner
- 2008 – De dödas bok
- 2013 – Så länge jag kan minnas har jag varit ensam

== Awards ==
- 1993 – Stig Carlson-priset
- 1995 – Tidningen Vi:s litteraturpris
- 1996 – Guldprinsen
- 1997 – De Nios Vinterpris
- 1999 – Karin Boyes litterära pris
- 2000 – Gerard Bonniers lyrikpris
- 2002 – Sveriges Radios Lyrikpris
- 2008 – De Nios lyrikpris
- 2013 – Stipendium ur Lena Vendelfelts minnesfond
- 2015 – Aspenströmpriset
