= Eva Runefelt =

Swedish novelist and poet (born 1953)

- Born: 1953 (age 72–73)
- Occupations: Poet and novelist
- Awards: Dobloug Prize (1994); De Nios lyrikpris (2008)

Eva Virginia Runefelt (born 1953) is a Swedish novelist and poet. She made her literary debut in 1975, with the novel I svackan. Her poetry collections include En kommande tid av livet from 1975 and Mjuka mörkret from 1997. She was awarded the Dobloug Prize in 1994. She won De Nio Lyrical Prize in 2008 and the Tranströmerpriset in 2018.
