= Birgitta Trotzig =

Swedish writer

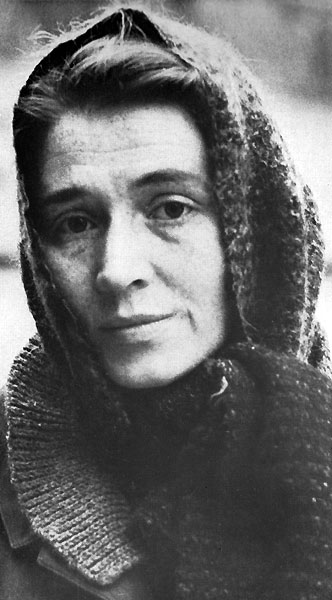
- Born: Astri Birgitta Kjellén; 11 September 1929; Gothenburg, Sweden
- Died: 14 May 2011 (aged 81); Lund, Sweden
- Occupations: Novelist, essayist, poet

Birgitta Trotzig (11 September 1929 – 14 May 2011) was a Swedish writer who was elected to the Swedish Academy in 1993. She was one of Sweden's most celebrated authors, and wrote prose fiction and non-fiction, as well as prose poetry.

== Biography ==
Trotzig was born in Gothenburg, Sweden, as an only child. The family lived initially with her maternal grandparents in Gothenburg, later moving to the small southern city of Kristianstad, where her parents' parents worked as teachers. She graduated from grammar/high school in 1948. Trotzig returned to Gothenburg and studied literary history. She began writing for the national newspaper Aftonbladet and for the literary magazine Bonniers Litterära Magasin. She married artist and sculptor Ulf Trotzig and lived in Paris from 1955 to 1969 with her husband; during this period she converted to Roman Catholicism. Through her conversion, she gained access to various aspects of French culture and to Christian and Jewish mysticism; she became very interested in San Juan de la Cruz and Pierre Teilhard de Chardin.

Birgitta Trotzig was the recipient of many literary prizes, amongst others the Övralid Prize in 1997. Birgitta Trotzig lived in Lund and remained active in public life and with the various projects of the Swedish Academy for much of her later life.

On 15 May 2011, Peter Englund published the news of Trotzig's death in the evening of 14 May after a long illness.

== Literary career ==
Trotzig was one of Sweden's most renowned modern writers, having written several novels in which she gave voice to her Catholic faith (though her perspective is said to have been existential rather than Christian) and her dark visions. Returning themes are the death and resurrection of love. Among her novels are Sjukdomen ("The Illness") (made into the movie Kejsaren, "The Emperor," in 1979) and Dykungens dotter ("The Mud King's daughter") (1985). She also wrote essays and articles on poetry, and works of prose poems: Anima (1982) and Sammanhang ("Contexts") (1996).

== Bibliography ==
=== Prose fiction ===
- Ur de älskandes liv (Stockholm: Bonnier, 1951, "From the Life of Those Who Love")
- Bilder (Stockholm: Bonnier, 1954)
- De utsatta: En legend (Stockholm: Bonnier, 1957, "The Exposed")
- Ett landskap: Dagbok, fragment 54-58 (Stockholm: Bonnier, 1959)
- En berättelse från kusten (1961, "A Tale from the Coast")
- Utkast och förslag (Helsinki: Söderström, 1962; Stockholm: Bonnier, 1962)
- Levande och döda: Tre berättelser (Helsinki: Söderström, 1964; Stockholm: Bonnier, 1964)
- Sveket (Stockholm: Bonnier, 1966)
- Ordgränser (Stockholm: Bonnier, 1968)
- Teresa (Stockholm: Bonnier, 1969)
- Sjukdomen (Stockholm: Bonnier, 1972)
- I kejsarens tid: Sagor (Stockholm: Bonnier, 1975, "In the Time of the Emperor")
- Berättelser (Stockholm: Bonnier, 1977, "Stories")
- Jaget och världen (Stockholm: Författarförlaget, 1977)
- Anima: Prosadikter (Stockholm: Bonnier, 1982)
- Dykungens dotter: En barnhistoria (Stockholm: Bonnier, 1985)
- Porträtt: Ur tidshistorien (Stockholm: Bonnier, 1993)
- Sammanhang: Material (Stockholm: Bonnier, 1996)
- Dubbelheten: tre sagor (Stockholm: Bonnier, 1998, "Doubleness: Three Tales")
- Gösta Oswald (Stockholm: Norstedt, 2000)

=== Essay collections ===
- Utkast och förslag (1962, "Sketches and Ideas")
- Jaget och världen (1977, "The Ego and the World")

=== With Ulf Trotzig ===
- Dialog: om Ulf Trotzigs konstnärsskap (Stockholm: Arena, 1996)

Cultural offices
Preceded by Per Olof Sundman	Swedish Academy, Seat No 6; 1993–2011	Succeeded by Tomas Riad
