= 36th Moscow International Film Festival =

Film festival

- Opening film: Red Army
- Closing film: Dawn of the Planet of the Apes
- Location: Moscow, Russia
- Founded: 1959
- Awards: Golden George
- Festival date: 19–28 June 2014
- Website: Website

The 36th Moscow International Film Festival took place from 19 to 28 June 2014. Russian film director Gleb Panfilov was the head of the main jury. Gabe Polsky's Red Army was selected to open the festival with Matt Reeves' Dawn of the Planet of the Apes closing it. The Japanese film My Man won the Golden George.

== Jury ==
Main Competition

- Gleb Panfilov (Head of the Jury) (Russian film director)
- Abderrahmane Sissako (Mauritanian film director)
- Franziska Petri (German actress)
- Levan Koguashvili (Georgian film director)
- Laurent Danielou (French film producer)

Documentary Competition

- Sean McAllister (Jury Chairman) (British filmmaker)
- Amir Labaki (Brazilian film festival director)
- Alina Rudnitskaya (Russian film director)

FIPRESCI Jury

- Gideon Kouts (President) (France)
- Andres Nazarala (Chile)
- Rita di Santo (United Kingdom)
- Caroline Weidner (Germany)
- Olga Surkova (Russia)

== Films in competition ==
The following films were selected for the main competition:

English title	Original title	Director(s)	Production country
Beti and Amare	Beti and Amare	Andy Siege	Romania, Spain, United States, Canada, Germany, Ethiopia
Haven	Ir Mikalat	Amikam Kovner	Israel
Dreamland	Traumland	Petra Volpe	Germany, Switzerland
Eye Am	Gözümün Nûru	Hakki Kurtulus, Melik Saracoglu	Turkey
White Yagel	Belyy yagel	Vladimir Tumayev	Russia
Hardcore Disco	Hardkor Disko	Krzysztof Skonieczny	Poland
Brothers: The final confession	Braty. Ostannya spovid	Victoria Trofimenko	Ukraine
Yes and Yes	Da i Da	Valeriya Gai Germanika	Russia
My Man	Watashi no Otoko	Kazuyoshi Kumakiri	Japan
The Sentimentalists	Oi aisthimaties	Nicholas Triandafyllidis	Greece
Unripe Pomegranates	Anar Haye Naras	Majid-Reza Mostafavi	Iran
Reporter	Reporter	Thijs Gloger	Netherlands
The Avian Kind	Joryu Ingan	Yeon-Shick Shin	South Korea
The Whole Shebang	Alles Inklusive	Doris Dörrie	Germany
Paris Follies	La ritournelle	Marc Fitoussi	France
A Most Wanted Man	A Most Wanted Man	Anton Corbijn	United Kingdom, United States, Germany

== Awards ==
- Golden Saint George for Best Film: My Man by Kazuyoshi Kumakiri, Japan
- Silver Saint George Special Jury Prize: Eye Am by Hakki Kurtulus, Melik Saracoglu, Turkey
- Silver Saint George for Best Director: Valeriya Gai Germanika, Yes and Yes, Russia
- Silver Saint George for Best Actor: Tadanobu Asano, My Man, Japan
- Silver Saint George for Best Actress: Nataliya Polovynka, Brothers: The Final Confession, Ukraine
- Silver Saint George for Best Documentary: Deep Love by Jan P. Matuszyński, Poland
- Silver Saint George for Best Short Film: 14 Steps by Max Shavkin, Russia
