= Il sole dei cattivi =

2013 film directed by Paolo Consorti

Il sole dei cattivi is the first cinematic film by artist and video maker Paolo Consorti. Filmed in 2013 and divided into two parts, it depicts the Biblical stories of Herod and Caiaphas, but set against a present-day reality show.

== Plot ==
The film is divided into two parts. It tells the story of the historical figures of Herod and Caiaphas, who are brought into the present and participate respectively in the living Nativity scene of Grottammare and a show about the Passion of Christ in Larino.

== Productions ==
The film, produced by the Opera Totale, was shot in Marche and Molise. Surrounding the cast, the locations and the extras have a role in the respective religious evocations of the Nativity and the Living Passion.

== Awards ==
- Best film: People and Religions – Terni Film Festival
- Best leading actors: Nino Frassica e Luca Lionello - People and Religions – Terni Film Festival
