= Olhopil =

Olhopil may refer to:

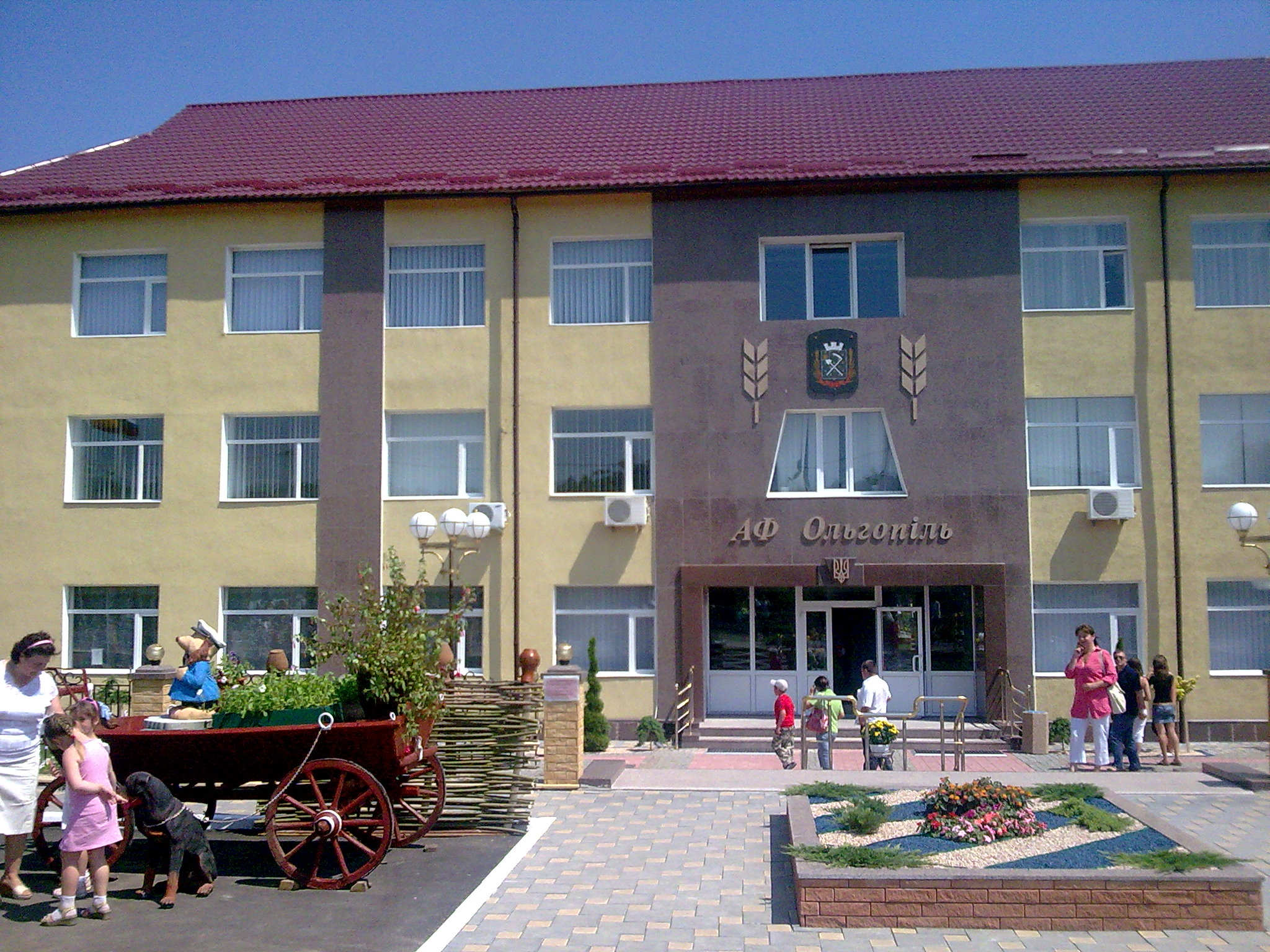

- Olhopil, Vinnytsia Oblast, a village in Vinnytsia Oblast, Ukraine
- Olhopil, Mykolaiv Oblast, a village in Mykolaiv Oblast, Ukraine
