= My Man (2014 film) =

- Original Japanese poster
- Directed by: Kazuyoshi Kumakiri
- Written by: Takashi Ujita
- Based on: Watashi no Otoko by Kazuki Sakuraba
- Starring: Fumi Nikaidō; Tadanobu Asano; Kengo Kora
- Edited by: Zenzuke Hori
- Music by: Jim O'Rourke
- Production company: Nikkatsu
- Release date: 14 June 2014 (Japan)
- Running time: 129 minutes
- Country: Japan
- Language: Japanese
- Box office: ¥19.4 million (Japan)

My Man (Japanese: 私の男, Hepburn: Watashi no Otoko) is a 2014 Japanese romantic drama film directed by Kazuyoshi Kumakiri and based on Kazuki Sakuraba's Watashi no Otoko novel. The film follows a foster father and daughter and the lengths they take to maintain the twisted nature of their relationship. It was released on 14 June 2014 in Japan.

The film won the Golden George at the 36th Moscow International Film Festival and Tadanobu Asano won the award for Best Actor. Fumi Nikaidō won International Rising Star Award for this film at New York Asian Film Festival and Best Actress at 6th Tama Film Awards.

== Story ==
Following the 1993 Okushiri earthquake, 10 year-old Hana Kusarino is orphaned from the disaster and resides in an emergency shelter. Jungo, a 26-year-old distant relative of Hana's father and an orphan himself, decides to adopt Hana as a favor to her parents despite the misgivings of village elder Oshio.

Six years later, Jungo and Hana live in Monbetsu, Hokkaido where Hana is now a high school student, Jungo works as a cook for the local coast guard, and Oshio serves as a grandfatherly figure to them. Jungo's girlfriend Komachi feels emotionally neglected by him and observes that he is more affectionate towards his adopted daughter than her. Visibly jealous at Komachi, Hana challenges her if she is willing to die for Jungo. Disturbed by their conversation, Komachi breaks up with Jungo and departs for Tokyo.

Jungo and Hana are revealed to be in a forbidden sexual relationship, spurred by their mutual loneliness and longing for one another. Oshio discovers the two having sex at home, with Hana spotting him outside but remaining silent. Oshio later confronts Hana by the sea and tells her that her father is manipulating her, revealing that he had discovered that Jungo is Hana's biological father, born from an affair Jungo had with Hana's mother when they were younger. Hana reveals that she had already known about Jungo being her real father, willingly committing incest to help each other get over the loneliness of losing their loved ones. Hana causes the ice Oshio is standing on to crack and drift away, and she coldly refuses to save him to keep her secret safe as he freezes to death.

Following Oshio's funeral, Jungo and Hana move to Tokyo where the two continue their affair. Jungo finds work as a taxi driver while Hana continues her studies. Monbetsu coast guard officer Taoka travels to Tokyo to confront Jungo with evidence of Hana's involvement in Oshio's death, but Jungo kills Taoka to cover up their secret.

Years later, Hana has become more independent after graduating from college, found a job as a receptionist, and discontinued having sex with her father. Jungo spirals into alcoholism out of guilt for killing Taoka and due his daughter's distance. Hana begins dating her coworker Yoshiro. When Yoshiro brings a drunk Hana home, a jealous Jungo humiliates Yoshiro by ordering him to strip down. Yoshiro pushes him off and leaves.

After some time, an unkempt Jungo goes to meet Hana and her new fiancé Daisuke at a fancy restaurant. As Jungo converses with Daisuke, Hana seductively caresses her father's leg and they stare into each other's eyes.

== Cast ==
- Fumi Nikaidō as Hana Kusarino
  - Mochika Yamada as Hana (10 years old)
- Tadanobu Asano as Jungo Kusarino
- Kengo Kora as Yoshiro Ozaki
- Aoba Kowai as Komachi
- Tatsuya Fuji as Oshio
- Moro Morooka as Taoka
- Takahiro Miura as Daisuke

== Reception ==
The film has grossed ¥19.4 million in Japan.
