= Paris Follies =

2014 French comedy film

- French theatrical release poster
- Directed by: Marc Fitoussi
- Written by: Sylvie Dauvillier; Marc Fitoussi
- Produced by: Marc Fitoussi
- Starring: Isabelle Huppert; Jean-Pierre Darroussin
- Cinematography: Agnès Godard
- Edited by: Laure Gardette
- Music by: Tim Gane; Sean O'Hagan
- Production companies: Avenue B Productions; Vito Films; SND Films; France 2 Cinéma; Les Films de la Suane
- Distributed by: SND Films
- Release date: 11 June 2014
- Running time: 98 minutes
- Country: France
- Language: French
- Budget: $5 million
- Box office: $2.9 million

Paris Follies (French: La Ritournelle) is a 2014 French comedy film written and directed by Marc Fitoussi. It stars Isabelle Huppert, Jean-Pierre Darroussin and Michael Nyqvist. It competed in the main competition section of the 36th Moscow International Film Festival.

== Plot ==
Brigitte Lecanu lives on the countryside as the wife of a cattle breeder. During a party at the neighbour's Brigitte gets to know a younger man from Paris who adores her. Feeling flattered she pretends to have to visit a dermatologist in Paris. After her devotee has disappointed her she begins an affair with a Danish businessman. Her husband Xavier follows her to Paris, hoping to save their marriage.

== Cast ==
- Isabelle Huppert as Brigitte Lecanu
- Jean-Pierre Darroussin as Xavier Lecanu
- Michael Nyqvist as Jesper
- Pio Marmaï as Stan
- Marina Foïs as Christiane
- Audrey Dana as Laurette
- Anaïs Demoustier as Marion
- Clément Métayer as Grégoire
- Jean-Charles Clichet as Régis
- Lakshanta Abenayake as Apu
- Louise Coldefy as restaurant server
