= Victoria Trofimenko =

Ukrainian filmmaker, scriptwriter and producer

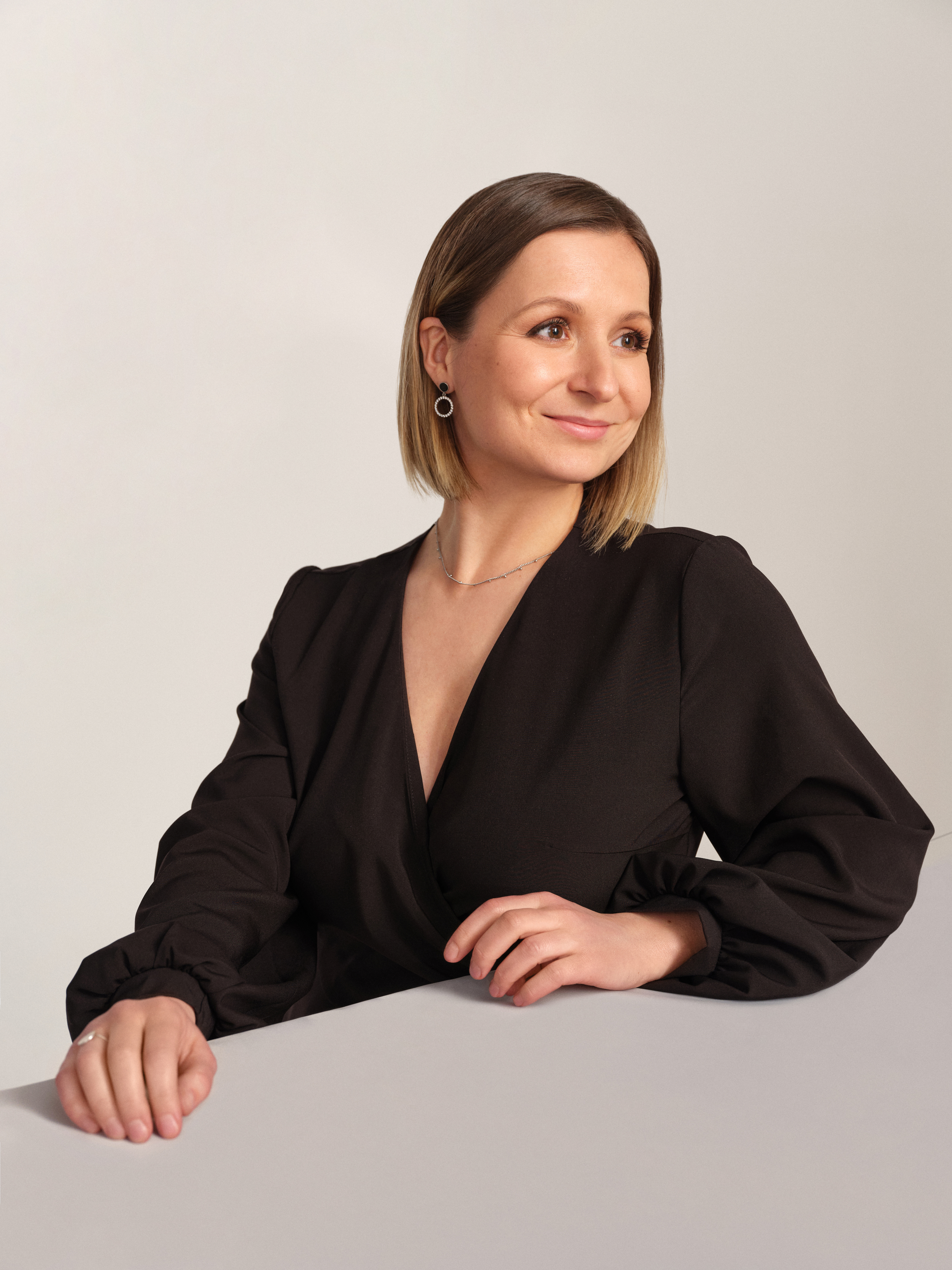
- Citizenship: Ukrainian
- Education: Ivan Karpenko-Kary Kyiv National University of Theater, Cinema and television
- Occupations: Director, screenwriter, creative producer

Victoria Trofimenko is Ukrainian / American filmmaker, scriptwriter and producer, based in, US. She is a member of the European Film Academy, the Union of Cinematographers of Ukraine, and the Ukrainian Film Academy. She is also one of the initiators of the creation of the Directors Guild of Ukraine.

According to Forbes magazine, in 2015, she was listed among the top 6 film directors in Ukraine.

== Professional activity ==
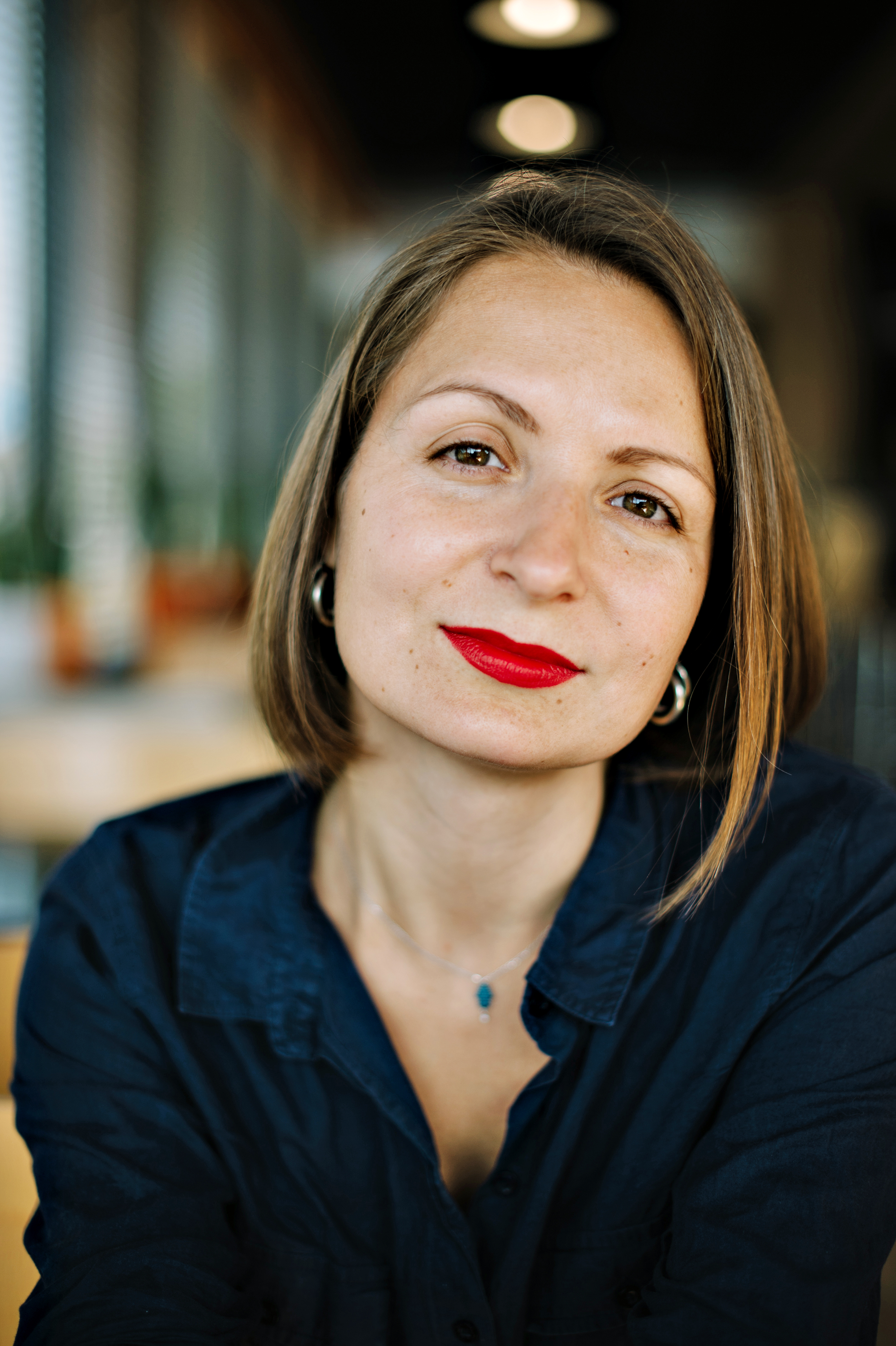
Victoria Trofimenko. Photographer: Kateryna Lashchykova

She was born in Novosibirsk and moved to Ukraine when she was one year old.

Trofimenko graduated from the Kyiv National University of Culture and Arts with a specialization in international tourism management. MA-qualification. She then studied at the Ivan Karpenko-Kary Kyiv National University of Theater, Cinema and Television, majoring in directing; MA-qualification; Diploma with honor.

Her first documentary film, "Back Home" (2005), was made in collaboration with the British company FIMP Ltd. It was screened at theaters: in London (Soho), and Cardiff (Chapter Cinema). She also co-directed the film "Mothersland" (2006). From 2006 to 2007, she worked as a director and journalist on the TV program "Parallel World" at Pilot Studio, which aired on STB. From 2008 to 2009, she worked as a director on STB's program "In Search of Truth" and created documentary telefilms such as "Professor Viktor Petrov"(2008), "Nine Lives of Terrorist Yakiv Blumkin" (2008) and "Nestor Makhno" (2009).

In 2008, she read the book "Sweetness" by the iconic Swedish writer Torgny Lindgren. Since then, she started looking for an opportunity to turn it into a film. She independently worked on the film's development, establishing the company ALBA FILM, to acquire the option for adapting the book. In 2011, she joined collaboration with Pronto Film. In 2011, her project "Brothers. The Final Confession" ranked first at the Ukrainian State Film Agency's first pitching event. The production process was launched.

In 2013, her film "Brothers. The Final Confession" became her debut feature film. The film was successful and received numerous awards at international film festivals. The film was the first Ukrainian movie since Ukraine's independence to be selected for three "class A" film festivals: the International Film Festival of India in Goa, the Shanghai International Film Festival, and the Moscow International Film Festival. Most of the actors, except for Viktor Demertash (the only experienced actor in full lengths), made their debut in cinema with this film. "Brothers. The Final Confession" was also the first Ukrainian film in which the actors spoke in the Hutsul dialect. This film marked the beginning of a new wave in Ukrainian auteur cinema.

When presenting the film at the Moscow Film Festival in 2014, the team undertook a mission of cultural diplomacy, giving interviews to the Russian press and calling for an end to the war. The film's representatives did not participate in the festival's parties and openings. After the screening, press conferences, and a series of interviews, they left Russia. Receiving the prizes on behalf of the team Serhiy Trymbach (the head of the Union of Ukrainian Cinematographers at the time) called from the stage for the release of Oleg Sentsov. At that moment, Nikita Mikhalkov, the head of the Union of Russian Filmmakers at that time, joined Serhiy Trymbach on stage. Unfortunately, the filmmakers' appeal did not yield positive results.

In 2016, the film "My Grandmother Fanni Kaplan" directed by Olena Demyanenko was released, in which Victoria Trofimenko played the role of a political convict.

In the same year, at the 9th pitching of the Ukrainian State Film Agency, Victoria Trofimenko advanced to the second round with the feature film project "Downshifting. It was the first Ukrainian project to be selected for the annual Screen + program (Andrzej Wajda's studio and school) in Warsaw to develop the screenplay. The script was co-written with Roman Horbyk, inspired by the book "Diary of Satan" by Leonid Andreyev.

During the pitching event, a discussion arose about supporting the project because the film was planned to be shot in English with foreign actors in the United Kingdom and India. This became the sole obstacle, leading to the lack of support for the project.

In 2017, at the tenth pitching of the Ukrainian State Film Agency, Victoria Trofimenko, along with Pronto Film company and producer Maxim Asadchy, presented the feature film project "Yakiv," based on the original script written by Victoria Trofimenko about the real life of Yakiv Drobot, a person who saved 2800 people from starvation in his village in Cherkasy region during the Holodomor. Despite "Yakiv" securing the second place in the initial round based on expert votes among all submitted projects, falling just a few fractions behind Agnieszka Holland's project "Mr. Jones," it was not supported due to the character of the main hero, who couldn't be a Communist collaborator. The same reason led to its rejection in 2018 during the Patriotic Cinema pitching at the Ministry of Culture.

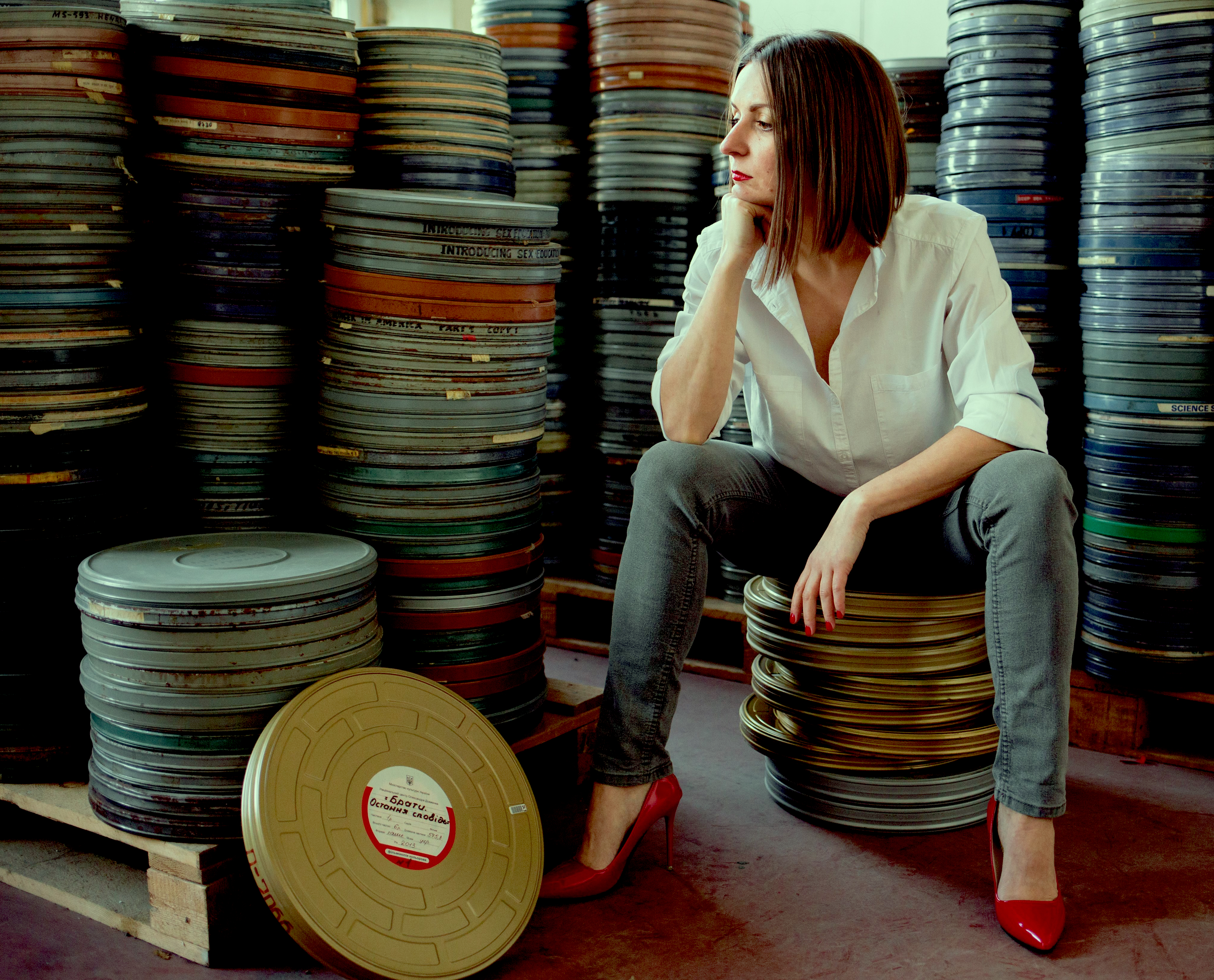
Victoria Trofimenko. Photographer: Tyma Myronenko

In 2019, the film "Yakiv" won the Ukrainian State Film Agency's pitching competition. However, the new Minister of Culture, Borodyansky, compelled the board overseeing the State Film Agency's support to reduce the number of funded projects due to the agency exceeding its annual budget. As a result, because of its high budget, "Yakiv" was excluded from the list of films eligible for support. Later on, the director released an online teaser for the movie "Yakiv", which triggered a storm of reactions from the press and the public, astonished by the absence of support.

In 2018, it was revealed that Victoria Trofimenko start producing development of the project The Road – joint collaboration of woman filmmakers: Victoria Trofimenko (segment "Virka»), Belgium director Delphine Noels (segment "The Love Supreme") and Indian director of Ukrainian origin Daria Gaikalova (segment "Two Roti") to work on a three-part anthology film where the main characters would be women who have endured tragedies. In July 2018, the project participated in the Odesa International Film Festival's pitching competition, and within three years, Afghan director Sahraa Karimi joined the team. Thus, it grown to a co-production involving the Belgium, India, Afghanistan, and Ukraine.

Since July 2022, Victoria Trofimenko has been working over the stage play based on the "Yakiv" screenplay, she started to compose theater adaptation at Ingmar Bergman's residence at Faro Island (Sweden) and continued at the University of Texas at Austin (US). On November 22, 2025, she directed the stage production Yakiv at the Ivano-Frankivsk National Academic Ukrainian Musical Drama Theater in honor of Ivan Franko, based on her own stage play.

Festivals and awards of the film "Brothers. The Final Confession"
Year	Film Award / Film Festival	Category / Award	Nominee	Result
2013	International Film Festival of India	"Golden Peacock" for Best the Picture	"Brothers. The Final Confession"	Nomination
2014	Shanghai International Film Festival	Best Picture (Panorama)	"Brothers. The Final Confession"	Nomination
2014	Moscow International Film Festival	"Golden St. George for Best Picture	"Brothers. The Final Confession"	Nomination
2014	Moscow International Film Festival	"Silver St. George for Best Actress	Natalia Polovynka	Winner
2014	Beijing International Film Festival	Best film in Panorama	"Brothers. The Final Confession"	Winner
2014	Romanian International Film Festival	Best movie	"Brothers. The Final Confession"	Nomination
2014	Romanian International Film Festival	Opera Prima Award for Best Debut	"Brothers. The Final Confession"	Winner
2014	"Kinoshok" Film Festival	Best movie	"Brothers. The Final Confession"	Nomination
2014	"Kinoshok" Film Festival	Best case scenario	Victoria Trofimenko	Winner
2014	Baghdad International Film Festival	Jury prize	"Brothers. The Final Confession"	Winner
2014	Kyiv International Film Festival "Molodist"	«The Scythian Deer» for the Best Picture	"Brothers. The Final Confession"	Nomination
2014	Truskavets International Film Festival "Crown of the Carpathians"	Best Cinematography	"Brothers. The Final Confession"	Winner

Festivals and awards for the screenplay of "Gulag Eros of the Russian Mind""Gulag Eros of the Russian Mind"
Year	Film Award / Film Festival	Category / Award	Nominee	Result
2024	Kerala International Film Festival	Best Script	Gulag Eros of the Russian Mind	Winner

Festivals and awards for the film "Bonding"
Year	Film Award / Film Festival	Category / Award	Nominee	Result
2026	Omaha International Film Festival	Best Feature Film	Bonding	Winner
2026	Vero Beach Film Festival	Audience Award	Bonding	Winner
2026	Sunscreen Film Festival	Best Narrative Feature	Bonding	Winner
2026	WorldFest-Houston International Film Festival	Platinum Remi Award – Suspense/Thriller	Bonding	Winner
2026	WorldFest-Houston International Film Festival	Gold Remi Award for Best Music (Diego De Pietri)	Bonding	Winner
2026	WorldFest-Houston International Film Festival	Gold Remi Award for Best Supporting Actor (Gefferson White for performance as Cam)	Bonding	Winner
2026	San-Antonio Film Festival	The Jury Prize for Best Actor (David Nordstrand for performance as Zach)	Bonding	Winner

== Filmography ==
=== Director ===
- 2026 – Bonding
- 2013 – Brothers. The Final Confession
- TBA – The Road
- TBA – Yakiv
- "Professor Viktor Petrov" (2008)
- "Nine Lives of Terrorist Yakiv Blumkin" (2008)
- "Nestor Makhno" (2009)

=== Screen writer ===
- 2024 - Gulag Eros of the Russian Mind

=== Actress ===
- 2016 – My Grandmother Fani Kaplan

== Theatre ==
=== Director/dramaturgist ===
- 2025 – Yakiv
