= People and Religions – Terni Film Festival =

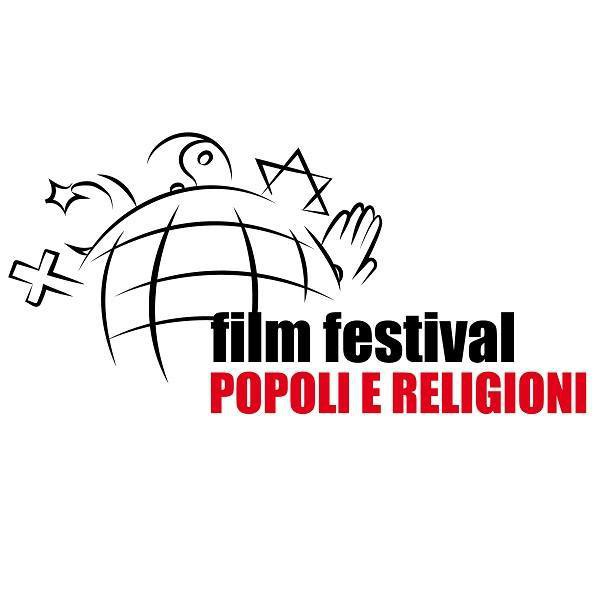
People and Religions - Terni Film festival

People and Religions – Terni Film Festival is an international film festival, which takes place annually in November at the CityPlex Politeama Lucioli in Terni, Italy and at many other venues around the town. It deals with interfaith dialogue, spirituality in cinema, immigrant integration, visual education and activities for prisoners. For two consecutive years, the festival was awarded the Medal of the President of the Italian Republic. It has been organized by ISTESS, Institute of Theological and Historical-Social Studies, directed by Stefania Parisi. Honorary president of the festival is Krzysztof Zanussi, Polish film director; the artistic director is Arnaldo Casali. Promoted by the diocese of Terni Narni Amelia (currently led by Bishop Giuseppe Piemontese) and by the Episcopal Conference of Umbria, the festival enjoys the patronage of the Municipality of Terni and the Pontifical Council for Culture, with the support of the Umbria Region, the Ministry of Cultural Heritage and Activities, as well as the Fondazione Cassa di Risparmio di Terni e Narni.

The festival oversees screenings for inmates of the Terni prison and matinee performances for students of elementary schools, middle and high schools, as well as universities; national and international premiers, meetings with authors, concerts, theatre performances, exhibitions and an international competition for feature films, short films and documentaries. One of the objectives of the festival is the integration of immigrants. Hence, every year the festival focuses on a selected region of the world, actively involving foreign communities in screenings, dance, musical performances, meetings and food tastings of typical regional products.

Since 2006 the Godmother of the festival is Maria Grazia Cucinotta. Among the many personalities who attended the first twelve events are Enzo Enzo Decaro, Ellen Stewart, Enrico Brizzi, Vincenzo Cerami, Lina Wertmuller, Roberto Citran, Renzo Rossellini, Guido Chiesa, Liliana De Curtis, Emanuela Aureli, Silvano Agosti, Arnaldo Colasanti, Angelo Longoni, Adelmo Togliani, the sand artist Gabriella Compagnone, Luis Bacalov, Philomena Lee (character of the film Philomena by Stephen Frears which is played by Judi Dench) as well as Dario Edoardo Viganò, prefect for the Vatican's Communications, who was president of the jury in 2008 and in 2011 and one of the authors of the book Tra cielo e terra [Between Heaven and Earth] and who received the career award in 2014. The festival is twinned with the Religion Today Film Festival in Trento and constitutes a network of European interfaith film festivals, including the Days of Cinema and Reconciliation of Notre-Dame de la Salette in France and the Sacrofilm Festival of Zamość in Poland.

It also constitutes a part of the network of film festivals of Umbria including the Perugia Social Film Festival, the Narni Cinema, the Montone Umbria Film Festival and the Spello Cinema Festival. In addition to the Best Film Award, Best Short Film and Best Documentary, the festival also awards the Jury Grand Prize, the Award for Best Film of Umbria and the awards for Best Director, Best Actor, Best Actress, Best Screenplay, Best Soundtrack, Best Photography, Best Effects, and the Angelo alla Carriera, work of art by the sculptor Fernando Dominioni.

Every year one evening of the festival is dedicated to St Francis of Assisi, the first Christian to peacefully convey a dialogue with another religion. All of this takes form of premiers, meetings, retrospectives and shows. The festival, now for the thirteenth consecutive year, has been gathering about 1000 spectators a day for over 9 days every year. Among the award-winning artists there are Alessandro D’Alatri, Krzysztof Zanussi, Paolo Consorti, Franco Battiato, Giuliano Montaldo, Lech Majewski, Jerzy Stuhr, Eugenio Barba, Amos Gitai, Ascanio Celestini, David Rondino, Nino Frassica, Elio Germano and the PFM Band. The festival has also produced two documentaries: Lo Spirito di Assisi in 2006 [The Spirit of Assisi] and Sarajevo Adesso in 2012 [Sarajevo Now], and a book: Tra Cielo e Terra [Between Heaven and Earth]. There is also another book related to the festival: Cinema, artisti e religione [Cinema, artists and religion] by Arnaldo Casali that constitutes a collection of interviews and opinions of, among others, Angelo Branduardi, Giobbe Covatta, Corrado Guzzanti, Sabrina Impacciatore, Neri Marcorè, Davide Rondoni, Carlo Verdone, Nanni Moretti and Alice Rohrwacher (Pendragon, 2011h).

== History ==
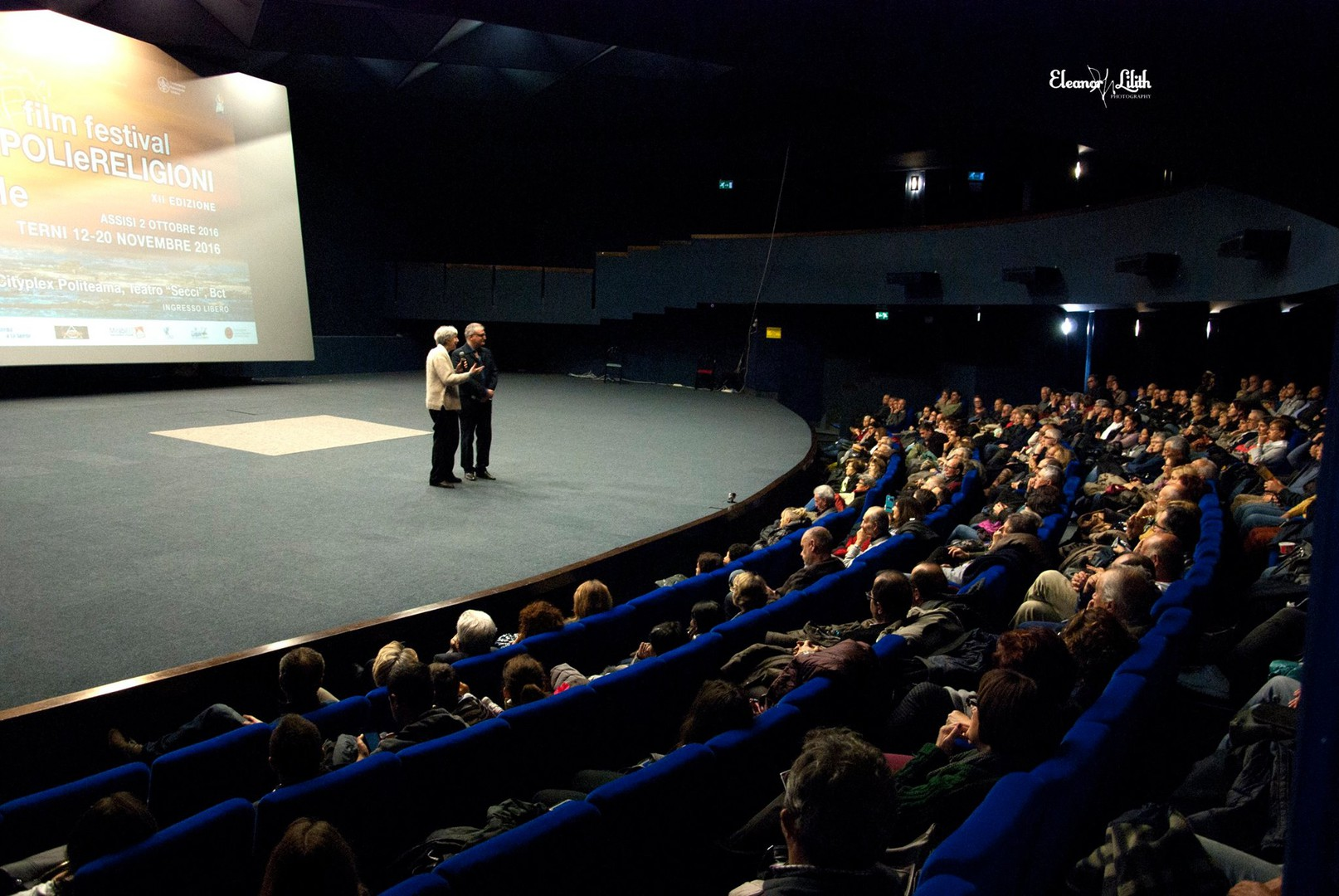
People and Religions - Terni Film festival "Babele"

The festival was conceived in 2005 by the then Bishop of Terni Vincenzo Paglia (spiritual counsellor of the community of Sant'Egidio, currently the president of the Pontifical Academy for Life) with the aim of creating a personal and religions dialogue through cinematographic art: a "meeting of civilizations" in response to the "clash of civilizations" raised after 11 September.

The first event was inaugurated on the Saturday, 19 November 2005 in the film studios of Papigno, at that time owned by Cinecittà and Roberto Benigni, who had used them for the filming of La Vita è Bella [Life Is Beautiful], Pinocchio, La Tigre e la Neve [The Tiger and the Snow] and the TV special L’ultimo del Paradiso.

The Godfather of the Festival was Carlo Fuscagni, founder of the Umbria Film Commission and then president of Cinecittà Holding. Artistic direction was done by Carlo Chatrian, who was then the deputy director of the Alba Film Festival and currently is the director of the Locarno Festival.

In 2006 the artistic direction responsibilities were handed down to Arnaldo Casali, Matteo Ceccarelli and Alessandro Minestrini. During that time the ‘friendship’ was initiated with Maria Grazia Cucinotta and Krzysztof Zanussi, who in 2011 became the Honorary President of the Festival. Zanussi was also the founder of the network of European film festivals. During the festival he met on stage Riccardo Leonelli, an actor who was later starring in his films: Interior Voices (2009) and Foreign Body (2015).

In 2009, in the context of the Focus on Africa, the project of the director Paolo Bianchini Il sole dentro [The Sun inside] was presented to the public for the first time. This film focused on the story of Yaguine and Fodè: two children from Guinea who died in 1999, hidden in the cargo compartment of an airplane heading to Brussels, where they wanted to deliver a letter "to the Rulers of Europe." This project was then still only in the stage of screenplay preparation: a scene was played live by Francesco Salvi (Italian actor) and two children from the Terni African community. In the following years, premiers of the film were shown and in 2012 the work was finally completed.

In 2010 the festival presented the show Il Giullare di Assisi [The Jester of Assisi] with an unprecedented San Francesco comedy (based on historical sources and studies) played by Francesco Salvi and Fabio Bussotti. On this special occasion, Fabio Bussotti played the role of Friar Leone (at the age of 21), just upon his return from winning the Silver Ribbon Award for Liliana Cavani's Film.

In 2011, Liliana Cavani, receiving the Angelo alla Carriera Award, announced her intention to shoot a third film on St Francis of Assisi, which was then released in 2014. In the same year, the screenwriter Pierluigi Frassineti joined the artistic direction and in 2013 he was joined by film director Oreste Crisostomi. Since 2014, the artistic direction has returned to Arnaldo Casali.

In 2015 the festival opened in the aftermath of the Paris bombings. A Polish video maker, Maria Lis, a student of the Paris Film School, who the lived in one of the areas affected, reported that she had luckily escaped the massacre because she had left Paris for the Terni Festival. The focus of that year's Festival was on Morocco and Islam, in response to the wave of racial hatred and Islamophobia following the attack on the "Charlie Hebdo" magazine and the murder of a Terni boy by a Moroccan drug dealer in the square right in front of the ISTESS centre.

This climate of tension led to special safety measures during the festival (in particular the inauguration day attended by the President of the Region, Catiuscia Marini, and the Cardinal Gualtiero Bassetti) and the controversy raised by the Italian newspaper "Libero" for the involvement of the Young Muslims of Italy Association.

In 2016, a short film focused on the Paris bombings: Salaam StDenis2015 by Federica Pacifico took part in the competition. Also in 2016, the festival was preceded by a special event at the Lyrick Theatre in Assisi, where the French film L’ami [The Dream of Francis] was given its world premiere. The film was also screened at the festival, introduced by a meeting with the medievalist historian Chiara Frugoni and the tenor Friar Alessandro Brustenghi who, for this occasion, performed the original melody of the Cantico delle creature [The Canticle of the Creatures], which he reconstructed himself.

== Awards ==
The award for Best Film was created in 2007, and for Best Short Film in 2012. The Award for Best Actor and Best Screenplay in 2014, Awards for Best Director, Best Photography, Best Soundtrack and Best Umbrian Film were established in 2016. From 2008 to 2010 the Prize awarded to Films outside of the competition was awarded by the public, while in 2016 the Jury Grand Prize was established among all categories in the competition. A special mention for production was set up inB. In 2016 special prizes were also awarded to Babele and Istess for the Jubilee of Mercy.

Best Film

2007 7km da Gerusalemme by Claudio Malaponti (Italy)

2008 Corazones de mujer by Davide Sordella & Paolo Benedetti (Italy-Marocco)

2009 Silent Wedding by Horatiu Malaele (Romania)

2010 Velma by Piero Tomaselli (Italy)

2011 The mill and the cross by Lech Majewski (Poland)

2012 When day breaks by Goran Paskaljevic (Serbia)

2013 The priest’s children by Vinko Bresan (Croatia)

2014 Il sole dei cattivi by Paolo Consorti (Italy)

2015 Histoire de Judas by Rabah Ameur Zamesche (France), Biagio by Pasquale Scimeca (Italy)

2016 Dough by John Goldschmidt (Great Britain – Hungary)

2017 La metamorfosi (England)

2018 Une saison en France by Mahamat Saleh Haorun (France)

Best Director

2016 Maria Rosaria Omaggio for the film Hey you! (Italy)

2017 Guglielmo Poggi for Siamo la fine del mondo (Italy)

2018 Alessandro D’Alatri for In punta di piedi (Italy)

2021 Kazem Mollaie for the film The Badger (Iran)

Career Award

2006 Krzysztof Zanussi

2007 Franco Battiato

2008 Alessandro D’Alatri

2009 Giuliano Montaldo

2010 awarded but not delivered to Luigi Magni

2011 Liliana Cavani and Pupi Avati

2012 Jerzy Stuhr

2013 Eugenio Barba, Ryszard Bugajski and Renato Scarpa

2014 Dario Edoardo Viganò and Amos Gitai

2015 Ascanio Celestini

2016 Elio Germano

2017 Franco Cardini and Religion Today

2018 Terence Hill

2019 Alice Rohrwacher

2020 SacroFilm Festival

2021 Giobbe Covatta

2022 Ninni Bruschetta

2023 Matteo Garrone and Abel Ferrara

Public Prize / Jury Grand Prize

2008 Pa-ra-da by Marco Pontecorvo (Italy)

2009 Interior Voices by Krzysztof Zanussi (Poland)

2010 Sul mare by Alessandro D’Alatri (Italy)

2016 L’ami by Arnaud Louvet & Renaud Fely (France)

Best Screenplay

2014 Le cauchon de Gaza by Sylvain Estibal (Palestine)

2015 Il giorno più bello by Max Nardari (Italy)

2016 Cambio di destinazione d’uso by Edoardo Siravo and Massimo Reale (Italy)

2017 Max Chicco for Amore grande (Italy)

2018 Eleonora Ivone and Angelo Longoni for Apri le labbra (Italy)

Best Actor

2014 Nino Frassica & Luca Lionello for Il sole dei cattivi (Italy) and Francesco Salvi for 10th & Wolf (USA)

2015 Roberto Herlitzka for Nell’ora che non immaginate (Italy)

2016 Emanuel Cohn for The little dictator (Israel)

2017 Paolo Graziosi for Amore grande (Italia) and Jerzy Stuhr for Il cittadino (Poland)

2018 Adriano Tardiolo for Lazzaro felice (Italy) and Wisodom Onoghemhenoser for Meshack (Nigeria)

Best Actress

2014 Celeste Casciaro for In grazia di Dio (Italy) and Emmanuelle Devos & Arenne Omari for Le fils de l’autre (France)

2015 Sara Serraiocco for Francesco (Italy)

2016 Charlotte Schioler for Slor (Denmark)

2017 Bianca Nappi for La mia famiglia a soqquadro (Italy)

2018 Marina Occhionero for L’età imperfetta (Italy)

Best Production

2015 Ore 18 in punto by Giuseppe Gigliorosso (Italy)

2016 Il nostro ultimo by Ludovico De Martino (Italy)

Moschin/Ubaldi Award - Best Cinema in Umbria

2016 My awesome sonorous life by Giordano Torreggiani

2017 In Arte Nino by Luca Manfredi

2018 Marialuna Cipolla

2019 Pietro Pulcini

2020 Gigi Proietti

2021 Marzia Ubaldi

2022 Emanuele Stracchi

2023 Barbara Petronio

2024 Fabio Bussotti

2025 Cecilia Miniucchi

Best Soundtrack

2016 PFM for Hey You! (Italy) 2017 Lucilla Galeazzi for Il contagio (Italy) 2018 Sergio Cammariere for Apri le labbra (Italy) and Marco Zurzolo for In punta di piedi (Italy)

Best Photography

2016 Daniele Poli for The Player (Italy) 2017 Alessia Scarso for Vasa Vasa (Italy) 2018 Antonio De Rosa for In the name of a god (Italy)

Best effects

2016 Le Tout Nouveau Testament by Jaco Van Dormael (Belgium)

Special Mentions

2014 Un minuto di silenzio by Matteo Ceccarelli (documentary)

2014 Chi fa Otello? by David Fratini (short film)

2016 Babilonia by Folco Napolini (Babel Award)

2016 Mariam by Faiza Ambah (film)

2016 Il potere dell’oro rosso by Davide Minnella (short film)

2016 Women in sink by Iris Zaki (documentary)

2016 Il mattino senza fine by Ciprian Mega (Istess Prize for the Jubilee of Mercy)

Best Short Film

2012 Babylon Fast Food by Alessandro Valori (Italy)

2013 Giù e su by Corina Zund (Switzerland)

2014 Acabo de tener un sueno by Javier Navarro (Spain)

2015 Nell’ora che non immaginate by David Gallarello (Italy)

2016 Adam & Eve by Bianca & Davey Morrison (USA) and Holy City by Imbal Bentzur and Mor Galperin (Israel)

2017 Siamo la fine del mondo by Guglielmo Poggi (Italy)

2018 Are you volleyball? by Mohammad Bakhshi (Iran)

Best Documentary

2005 Malgré la nuit by Marc Weymuller (France)

2006 Lettere dal Sahara by Vittorio De Seta (Italy)

2007 El misionero by Wojciech Staron (Poland)

2008 Sotto il cielo di Amedabad by Stefano Vignola & Stefano Ribechi (Italy)

2009 Il colore delle parole by Marco Simon Puccioni (Italy)

2010 (not assigned)

2011 Vera by Francesca Melandri (Italy)

2012 Quasi sposi by Fatma Bucak and Sergio Fergnachino (Italy-Turkey)

2013 Le cose belle by Agostino Ferrente and Giovanni Piperno (Italy)

2014 (not assigned)

2015 Uomini proibiti di Angelita Fiore (Italy)

2016 Il papa in versi by David Riondino (Italy-Cuba)

2017 Viaggio a Sud di Alessandro Seidita e Joshua Vahlen

2018 AMR – Storia di un riscatto di Maria Laura Moraci (Italia)

International Juries

2005 Popular Jury

2006 Popular Jury

2007 Popular Jury

2008 Dario Edoardo Viganò (critic), Enzo Decaro (actor), Marzia Ubaldi (actress)

2009 Paolo Bianchini (film director), Fabio Bussotti (actor), Andrzej Bubela (director of the Sacrofilm Festival of Zamość)

2010 Popular Jury

2011 Renzo Rossellini (producer), Guido Chiesa (film director), Deborah Young (director of the Taormina Film Fest)

2012 Angelo Longoni (film director), Luca Manfredi (film director), Roberto Zibetti (actor)

2013 Martine Brochard (actress), Claudio Gabriele (producer), Moreno Cerquetelli (journalist)

2014 Arnaldo Colasanti (critic), Mauro Cardinali (actor), Marek Lis (critic)

2015 Paolo Consorti (winner in 2014), Paola Rinaldi (actress), Giulio Guerrieri (director of the Corto Weekend Festival)

2016 Katia Malatesta (director of the Religion Today Festival of Trento), Angelita Fiore (winner in 2015), Marialuna Cipolla (musician)

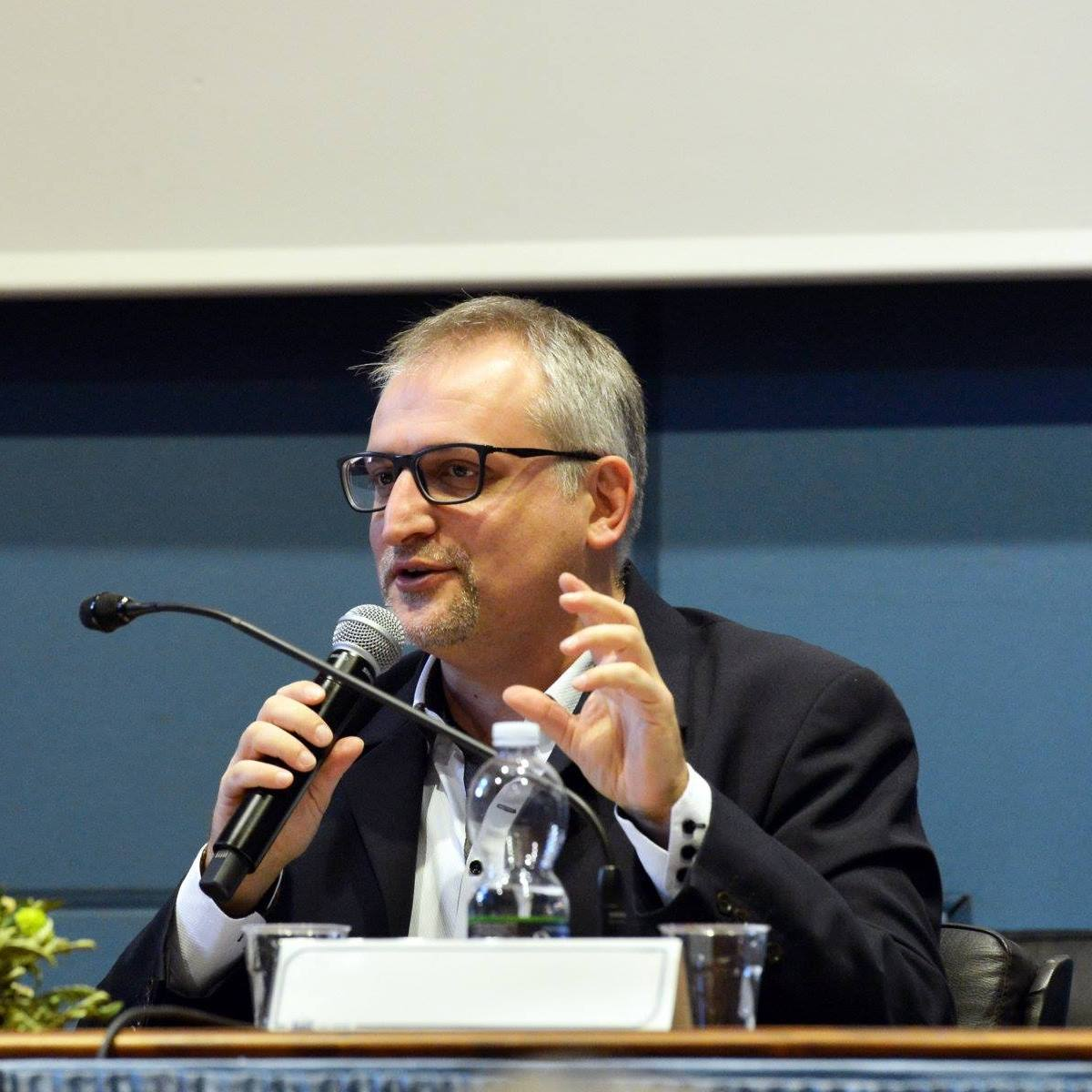
Arnaldo Casali - Artistic Director People and Religions - Terni Film Festival

Artistic directors

Carlo Chatrian (2005)

Arnaldo Casali, Monica Ceccarelli, Alessandro Minestrini & Matteo Ceccarelli (2006)

Alessandro Minestrini & Matteo Ceccarelli (2007–2010)

Pierluigi Frassineti (2011)

Arnaldo Casali (2012)

Oreste Crisostomi (2013)

Arnaldo Casali (2014–2020)

Riccardo Leonelli (2021)

Moni Ovadia (2022-2026)

== Franciscan Focus ==
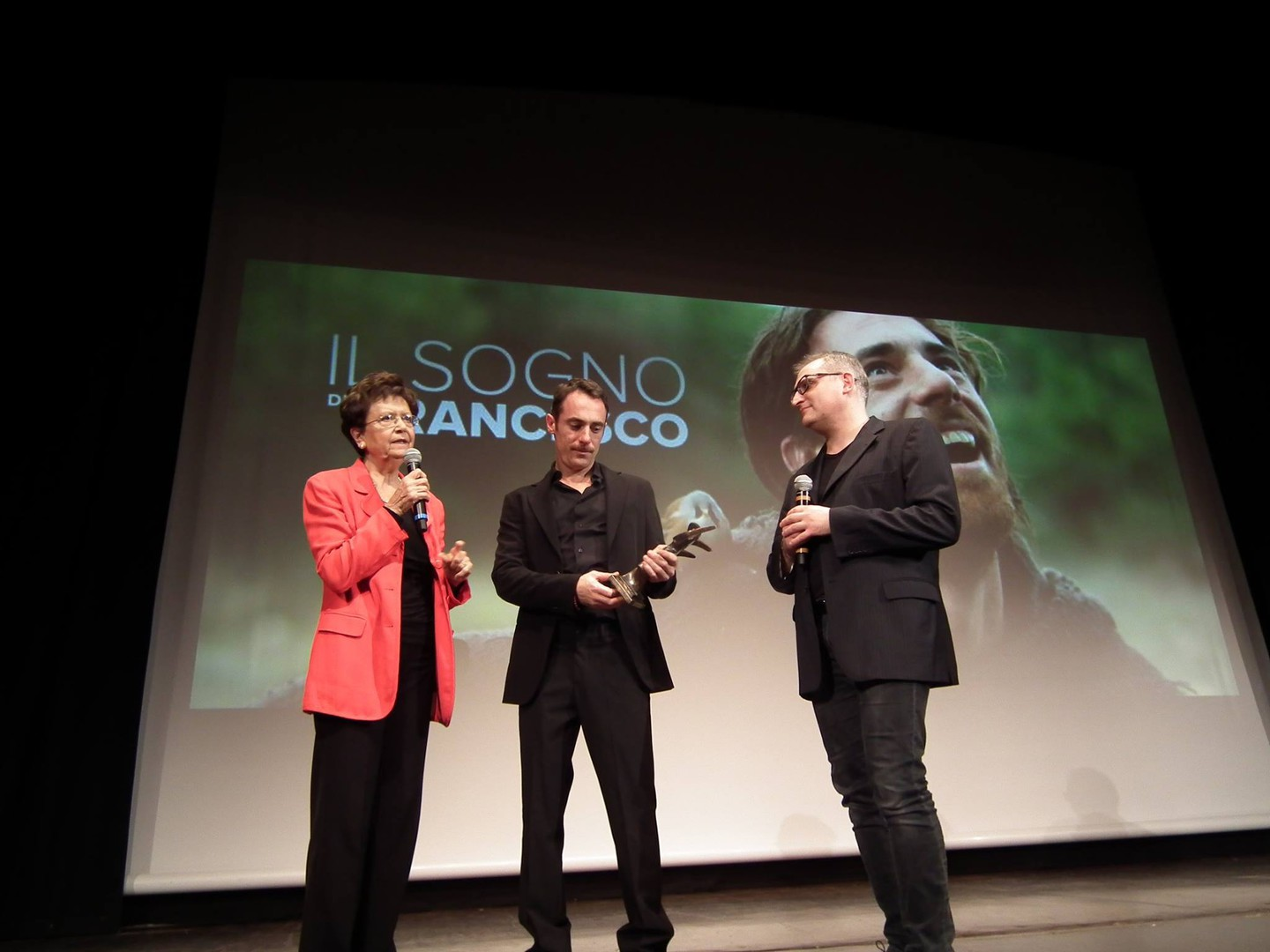
Il sogno di Francesco by Renaud Fely and Arnaud Louvet (2016); meeting with Renauld Fely, Arnaud Louvet, Fr. Enzo Fortunato, Marcello Mazzarella; Angelo alla Carriera Award to Elio Germano.

2006 – Screening of Francesco by Liliana Cavani (1989); Meeting with Liliana Cavani, Fabio Bussotti, Krzysztof Zanussi, Lilia Sebastiani (theologist).

2007 - Premiere of Il giorno, la notte. Poi l’alba by Paolo Bianchini (2007); meeting with Paolo Bianchini, screenwriter Marcello Sambati, Giorgio Cantarini and the rest of the cast of the film; Debate with Francesco Arlanch, screenwriter and for Clare and Francis (2007).

2008 - Presentation of the Umbrian Franciscan Ways with Bishop Vincenzo Paglia and the architect Paolo Leonelli. Debate with Andrea Armati, author of the book Lo stregone di Assisi; screening of Francis of Assisi by Michael Curtiz (1964); Eldar concert.

2009 – Screening of Frate Sole by Mario Corsi and Ugo Falena (1918) and the documentary/fiction San Francesco e frate Bernardo, il primo compagno by Fabrizio Benincampi. Meetings with Paolo Bianchini, Francesco Salvi, Vincenzo Paglia, Paco Reconti.

2010 - Screening of Francesco giullare di Dio by Roberto Rossellini (1950); premiere of the theatre performance Il giullare di Assisi by Arnaldo Casali with Francesco Salvi, Fabio Bussotti, Stefano de Majo and the Music group Eldar.

2011 - Screening of Francesco di Assisi by Liliana Cavani (1966); Angelo alla carriera Award to Liliana Cavani.

2012 – Screening of Uccellacci e uccellini by Pier Paolo Pasolini (1965) and of Clarisse by Liliana Cavani (2012); Exhibition of Friar Alessandro Brustenghi and Irene Boschi; meeting with Liliana Cavani.

2013 – Premiere of the short film Giro giro tondo by Giacomo Moschetti with Germano Rubbi and Giordano Agrusta (2013).

2014 – Screening of the film Il santo riluttante by Edward Dmytryk (1962); performance Francesco e il vescovo di Terni by Arnaldo Casali with Francesco Salvi, Fausto Tognini and the Eldar. Meeting with Fr. Giuseppe Piemontese, Bishop of Terni and the ex-Custodian of the Sacred Convent of Assisi.

2015 - Screening of Francesco by Liliana Cavani (2014); meeting with Liliana Cavani, Sara Serraiocco and Fr. Giuseppe Piemontese.

2016 - Assisi: World premiere of Il sogno di Francesco by Renaud Fely and Arnaud Louvet (2016); meeting with Renauld Fely, Arnaud Louvet, Fr. Enzo Fortunato, Marcello Mazzarella; Angelo alla Carriera Award to Elio Germano.

Terni – Screening of Il sogno di Francesco, meeting with Chiara Frugoni and musical performance of the original version of the Cantico delle creature by Friar Alessandro Brustenghi.

2017 – Screening of "Trzy Korony – Massimiliano Kolbe" and meeting with Festival Organizer of Niepokalanòw

2018 – Il Giullare di Dio – spettacolo, rigorosamente tratto dalle fonti francescane, con i testi di Arnaldo Casali affiancati dalle musiche di Fabrizio De Rossi Re è stato interpretato da Andrea Giuliano, Zoe Zolferino e Pavel Zelinskiy.

== Venues ==
The festival takes place at the Cinema Cityplex Politeama Lucioli inTerni, Umbria. The first two festivals were held at the film studios of Papigno, in the auditoriumO of Palazzo Primavera and in the cinema Fiamma, which closed in 2007.

In 2010 the festival took place entirely within the Caos Museum complex, while in 2014 and 2015 some events were hosted by the Diocesan Museum.

The Cenacolo San Marco, home of the Istess, every year hosts exhibitions, concerts, meetings and retrospectives. In 2013 the festival was in more than one place, and in addition to Terni, it was held in the cinemas of Narni and in the Sala Boccarini of Amelia. In 2016 the world premiere of the film Il sogno di Francesco was hosted by the Teatro Lyrick in Assisi.

== Other projects ==
In addition to the Terni Film Festival, the People and Religions Project oversees a series of ‘cineforum’ in schools, a prison and at the CityPlex Politeama cinema in Terni, and at the Cenacolo San Marco for immigrant community. On the occasion of celebration of Saint Valentine's Day, patron of Terni and lovers, special events are organized periodically: in 2008 - the premiere of the film Lezioni di cioccolato by Claudio Cupellin; in 2009 – a meeting with Alessandro D’Alatri and screening of Casomai; in 2011 – the theatrical performance Scene da un matrimonio by Ingmar Bergman starring Daniele Pecci and Federica Di Martino and directed by D’Alatri; also in 2016 – screening of Figli di Maam by Paolo Consorti and of the documentary San Valentino a Bussolengo produced by Istess, along with the showing of the short film Valentino con ghiaccio by Paolo Consorti in 2017.

== Focus On ==
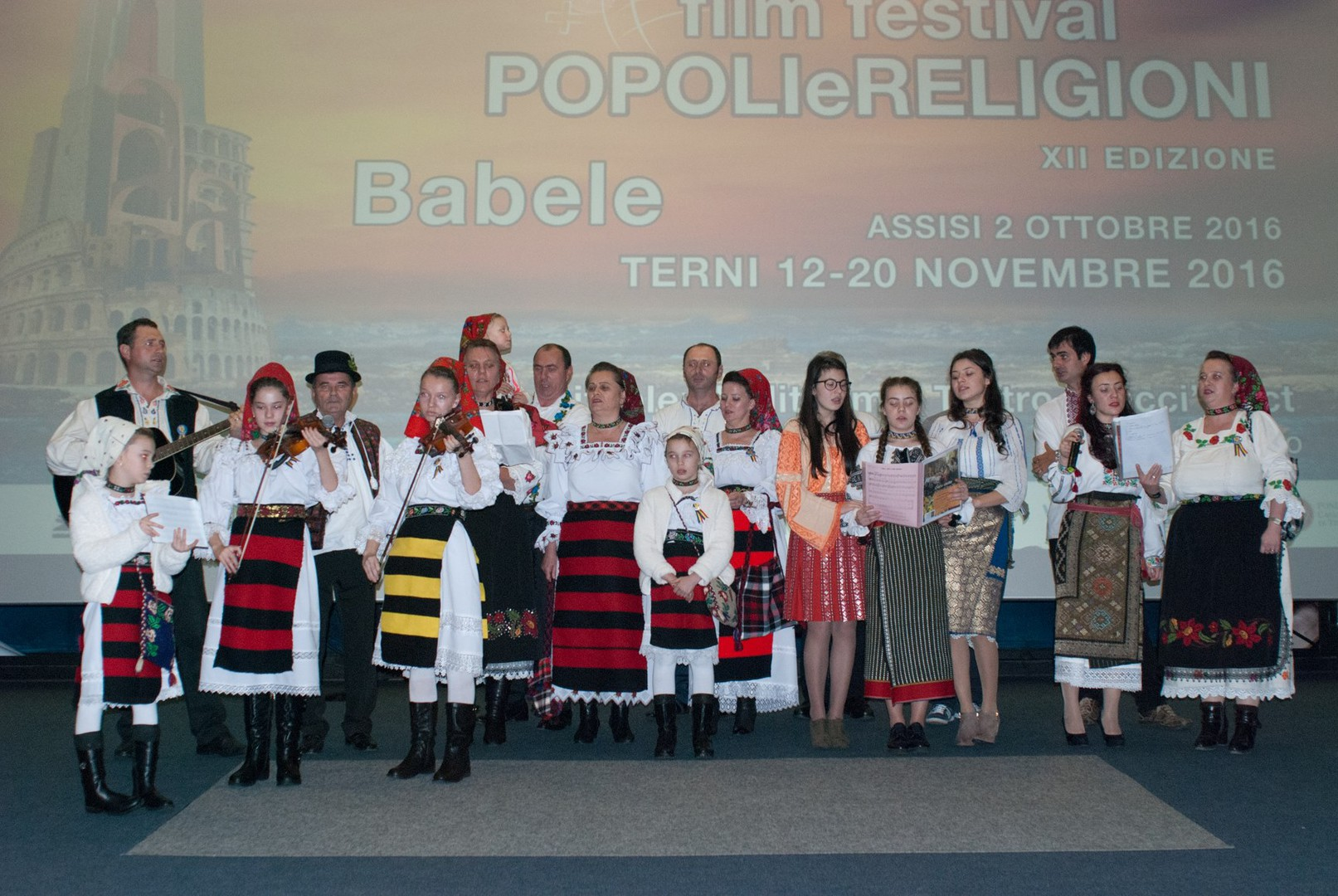
People and Religions - Terni Film Festival, Focus Romania 2017

2005 India

2006 Poland

2007 Latin America

2008 China

2009 Africa

2010 Bulgaria

2011 Maghreb

2012 Balkans

2013 Scandinavia

2014 Jerusalem

2015 Morocco

2016 Romania

2017 India

2018 Nigeria

2019 Italy

2020 Sabina

2021 Brazil

2022 Ukraine

2023 Israel&Palestina

2024 Bangladesh

2025 The New World

== Preview events ==
I event: Tra cielo e terra. From 19 to 22 November 2005.

II event: Popoli e Religioni. From 24 to 29 October 2006.

III event: Popoli e Religioni. From 3 to 11 November 2007.

IV event: Religioni e diritti umani. From 9 to 16 November 2008.

V event: Immigrazione e integrazione. From 7 to 15 November 2009.

VI event: Tra cielo, terra e mare. From 7 to 14 November 2010.

VII event: Donne d’oriente, donne d’occidente. From 20 to 27 November 2011.

VIII event: Primo: la famiglia. From 17 to 25 November 2012.

IX event: In cerca del padre. From 26 November to 1 December 2013.

X event: Ogni città è una Gerusalemme. From 8 to 16 November 2014.

XI event: Paradiso perduto. From 14 to 22 November 2015.

XII event: Babele. From 12 to 20 November 2016.

XIII event: Metamorfosi. From 11 to 19 November 2017.

XIV event: "L'Età imperfetta" from 10 to 18 November 2018

XV event: "First Man"from 9 to 17 November 2019

XVI event: "Contagion" from 7 to 15 November 2020 (Online) and from 23-30 May 2021 (On Theatre)

XVII event: "Cosa Sarà" from 6 to 14 November 2021

XVIII event: "All of Us" from 12 to 20 November 2022

XIX event: "Breaking Bread" from 11 to 19 November 2023

XX event: "The Big Blue" from 16 to 24 November 2024

XXI event "New World - Si vis pacem para pacem" from 6 to 16 November 2025

== Adesso ==
Since the first edition, the magazine Adesso (created in 1999, continuing the title and the legacy of the famous periodical of Don Primo Mazzolari) dedicates every year a whole edition to the festival. The magazine is distributed free of charge to all attendees and is published online.

Copies of "Adesso" on People and Religions are available online

2016 http://www.popoliereligioni.com/images/pdf/POPOLI_E-RELIGIONI_2016_small.pdf

2015 http://reteblu.altervista.org/wp-content/uploads/2015/11/adesso51.pdf

2014 http://reteblu.altervista.org/wp-content/uploads/2014/11/ADESSO50.pdf

2013 http://reteblu.altervista.org/wp-content/uploads/2013/11/ADESSO_2013_SMALL.pdf

2012 http://www.popoliereligioni.com/images/pdf/adesso_201_small.pdf

== Links ==
http://www.popoliereligioni.com/

http://www.ternifilmfestival.com/

http://www.istess.it/category/festival/

http://www.reteblu.org/

http://www.popoliereligioni.com/index.php/it/archivio
