= Nataliya Polovynka =

Ukrainian actress and singer (born 1965)

- Ната́лія Полови́нка
- Born: Nataliya Yukhymivna Polovynka; 27 July 1965 (age 61); Olhopil, Ukrainian SSR, Soviet Union (now Ukraine)
- Education: Lviv National Music Academy
- Occupations: Actress; singer; educator; director
- Years active: 1988–present
- Awards: see here

Nataliya Yukhymivna Polovynka (Note: Ukrainian: Наталія Юхимівна Половинка) (born 27 July 1965) is a Ukrainian soprano singer, actress in theater and movies, educator, and director of theater who won the Shevchenko National Prize in 2006, and founder and head of the Lviv Theater Center "Word and Voice". She plays classical music, old spiritual tunes from Ukraine, and traditional Ukrainian melodies.

== Early life and education ==
Born on 27 July 1965, in the Ukrainian village of Olhopil. Nataliya went to Mykola Leontovych Vinnytsia Music School from 1980 to 1984, and later took piano classes with professor Maria Tarnavetska at the Mykola Lysenko Lviv National Music Academy from 1984 to 1989. In Pontedera, she interned at the Jerzy Grotowski International Institute, in 1991.

== Career ==
Nataliya is the director of the theater center "Slovo i Holos" (Lviv) and has starring parts in movies of the filmsBrothers. She has collaborated with the International Jerzy Grotowski International Institute, the Lviv and Kyiv Philharmonic Symphony Orchestras, the Symphonic Orchestra of Lviv Opera, the State Male Choir Dudaryk, the State Men's M. Revutskyj Choir, the capella Dumka, and Cantus.

Pedagogy at the Jerzy Grotowski Institute's Atelier educational project, which took place in 2007 and 2008. She also became the actress and music director of the Les Kurbas Academic Theater in Lviv from 1988 to 2006. She created the Song Studio, which she led from 2003 until 2010 (Majsternia Pisni). She founds the Lviv Municipal Theater, Art, Research and Educational Center "Word and Voice" in 2010. She has been the author and director of the DREVO International Theater Festival since 2015.

Nataliya has authored several other musical and theatrical projects such as:

- ІРМОС, давні духовні наспіви України (2012)
- Пісні Вітру (2008)
- Квітка- невіста (2001)
- Вість літа (2001)
- По Рождеству (2009)
- Земля – Пісня (2023)
- Сад Божественних Пісень (2022)

== Other works ==
Nataliya has taught at Columbia University, University of Pennsylvania, Yale University (US), University of Wales (UK), and the Jerzy Grotowski International Institute (Poland).

== Filmography ==
Year	Title	Roles	Notes
2013	Brothers: The Final Confession	Writer	
2018	Unavailable	Lyuba	lead role
2018	Tera	Lyuba	lead role
2018	Eter	Mother of Taras	
2020	Mother of Apostles	Sofia Kulyk	
2023	Big Small War	Galya	main actors

== Awards and recognitions ==
Nataliya is a recipient of several honors, including the Shevchenko National Prize, and honors from several international film and theatrical festivals. Her accolades include the Silver George Award for Best Actress, which she received for her main performance in the 2013 film "Brothers: The Final Confession." She won five honors at major international film festivals in the US, Canada, Italy, and Ukraine for her leading performance in the movie "Mother of Apostles," which is based on the actual events of Russia's 2014 conflict with Ukraine.

- Shevchenko National Prize (2006)
- Merited Artist of Ukraine (2020)
- Theatrical Figure of the Year (2004)
- Lviv Theatrical Figure of the Year (1999)

Award	Year	Category	Nominated work	Result
Khersonese Games Festival	2001	Best Actress	Apocrypha	Won
Bosporan Agons Festival	2001	Best Actress	Apocrypha	Won
National Union of Theater Workers of Ukraine Award	2003	Vera Levytska Award	—N/a	Won
Moscow International Film Festival	2014	Silver George Award for Best Actress	Brothers: The Final Confession	Won
Kinokolo National Film Critics Award	2018	Best Actress	Tera	Nominated
Kinokolo National Film Critics Award	2021	Best Actress	Mother of Apostles	Nominated
National Union of Theater Workers of Ukraine Award	2019	Award for the best stage reproduction of the achievements of the Ukrainian people	—N/a	Won
New York Film Week	2021	Best Female Role	Mother of Apostles	Won
International Filmmaker Festival of New York	2021	Best Female Role	Mother of Apostles	Won
Ontario International Film Festival	2021	Best Female Role	Mother of Apostles	Won
Terni Film Festival	2021	Best Female Role	Mother of Apostles	Won
International Film Festival "Cinema and You"	2021	Best Female Role	Mother of Apostles	Won
Paris Film Awards	2022	Honorable Mention: Best Actress	Mother of Apostles	Won
Silk Road Film Awards Cannes	2022	March Award for Best Actress	Mother of Apostles	Won
Independent Film Festival in Cannes	2022	Best Acting	Mother of Apostles	Won
Five Continents International Film Festival	2022	Best Film Actress	Mother of Apostles	Won
