= Sweetness (novel) =

Book by Torgny Lindgren

- First edition
- Author: Torgny Lindgren
- Original title: Hummelhonung
- Language: Swedish
- Published: 1995
- Publisher: Norstedts förlag
- Publication place: Sweden
- Awards: August Prize of 1995

Sweetness (Swedish: Hummelhonung, lit. 'Bumblebee Honey') is a 1995 novel by Swedish author Torgny Lindgren. It won the August Prize in 1995.

== Adaptation ==
- Brothers: The Final Confession (Ukrainian: Брати. Остання сповідь) is a 2013 Ukrainian drama film directed by Viktoria Trofimenko is based on this novel.
