= Mother of Apostles =

- Directed by: Zaza Buadze
- Produced by: Dmytro Ovechkin
- Release date: 3 December 2020
- Running time: 122 minutes
- Country: Ukraine
- Languages: Russian, Ukrainian
- Budget: 21 million hrn.

Mother of Apostles (Ukrainian: «Мати Апостолів», romanized: Maty apostoliv) is a Ukrainian war drama directed by Zaza Buadze.

== History ==
The tragedy of war is shown through the story of one person — MOTHER. Before the viewer's eyes, a complete picture of the tragedy brought by war appears. The formerly prosperous region has turned into ruins not only of cities and villages, but what is much worse — into ruins of body and soul.

== Awards ==
List of awards and nominations
Award	Year	Category	Result	Ref.
III International Film Festival "Bukovyna" (Ukraine)	2020	"The best national feature film", "The best actor" (Aleksandr Pozharskyi)	Award Award	
10th International Filmmaker Festival of New York (США)	2021	"The best film", "The best actress" (Nataliya Polovynka), "Best Scenario"	Award Award Award	
7th Nevada Women's Film Festival	2021	"The best film"	Award	
11th Social World Film Festival	2021	"Special award of the professional jury", "Best Soundtrack"	Award Award	
Всеукраїнська премія у галузі культури і мистецтв	2021	"The best film of Ukraine", "The best director", "The best producer"	Award Award Award	
10-й МКФ «Кіно і ТИ	2021	"Best female role" (Nataliya Polovynka)	Award	
Berlin Film Week	2021	Semi-Finalist	Award	
6th Calella Film Festival	2021	"The best film", "The best director"	Award Award	
Ontario International Film Festival	2021	"The best director", "The best operator", "The best actress" (Nataliya Polovynka), "The best supporting actor" (Bohdan Beniuk)	Award Award Award Award	
New York Film Week	2021	"The best actress"	Award	
EFM кінофестивалю Berlinale	2020	Special screening		
24th Religion Today Film Festival	2021	"The best film"	Nominated	
Prishtina International Film Festival	2021	"The best film"	Nominated	
18 KYIV INTERNATIONAL FILM FESTIVAL	2021	"Golden frame"	Award	
17th Terni Film Festival	2021	«GRAND PRIX» « Award of the ecumenical jury of the Vatican" "The best actress" — Nataliya Polovynka "The best soundtrack" — Roman Hryhoriv and Ilya Razumeyko	Award Award Award Award	
The best artist	2021	Order "For the development of art of Ukraine"	Award	
Paradise Film Festival	2022	"The best movie"	Award	
Golden Wheat Awards	2022	"The best movie"	Award	International Cinema Community
Rome Prisma Film Awards	2022	"The best movie" "The best music" "Best Suits" "Best Trailer"	Award Award Award Award	
Cannes World Film Festival	2022	"The best film", "The best director", "The best composers", "The best producer"	Award Award Award Award	
ANATOLIAN FILM AWARDS	2022	"The best film"	Award	
High Tatras Film & Video Award	2022	"The best film"	Award	
Silk Road Film Awards-Cannes	2022	"Grand Prix", "The best director", "The best composers", "Best Actress", "The best operator"	Award Award Award Award Award	
Paris Film Awards	2022	"The best operator", "The best music", "The best montage", "The best film", "Special Award - Leading Female Role", "Special distinction - Screenplay", "Special distinction - Sound Design"	Award Award Award Award Award Award Award	
Hollywood Gold Awards	2022	«Silver Award»	Award	
"Echoes of Katyn» International Film Festival on Totalitarianisms	2022	«The best movie»	Award	
6th FIVE CONTINENTS INTERNATIONAL FILM FESTIVAL	2022	"Best Drama", "The best director", "The best music", "The best producer", "The best production designer", "Special distinction - Main female role"	Award Award Award Award Award Award	
Festival Internacional de Cine Independiente de Madrid	2022	"The best film"	Award	
	2022	«The best movie»	Nominated	
Monaco Streaming Film Festival	2022	«The best movie»	Nominated	
Golden FEMI Film Festival	2022	"The best film"	Nominated	
Asia Film Art International Film Festival	2022	"The best film"	Award	
Blacksphere festival	2022	"The best film"	Nominated	
Sofia Art Film Awards	2022	«The best movie»	Award	
Adolph Zukor International Film Festival	2022	"The best foreign film", "The best director", "Best Actress", "The best producer", «Special Award Starscron LTD»	Award Award Award Award Award	
Freedom Festival International	2022	"The best film" "The best operator"	Award	
Västerås Film Festival	2022	"Best International Feature Film", "The best director of an international feature film", "The best screenplay of an international feature film", "The best actor" Bohdan Benyuk "The best actor" Oleksandr Pozharskyi "The best actress" Nataliya Polovynka, «The best cinematographer»	Award Award Award Nominated Nominated Nominated Nominated	
BLASTOFF	2022	"The best film"	Award	
AFIN International Film Festival	2022	"The best actress"	finalist	
Adelaide Film Festival	2022		official selection	
Apulia Web Fest	2022		official selection	
Near Nazareth Festival	2022		finalist	
2022 ARFF Barcelona // International Awards	2022		official selection	
The International Film and Television Festival SIMFEST	2022		official selection	
Commffest Global Community Film Festival	2022		official selection	
Cannes 7th Art Awards 2022	2022		official selection	
Bayelsa International Film Festival	2022	"The best foreign film", "The best director", "Best Suits", "The best actor" Oleksandr Pozharskyi, "The best actress" Nataliya Polovynka, "The best cinematographer-director", "Best Scenario"	Nominated Nominated Nominated Nominated Nominated Nominated Nominated	
Cinematic European Film Festival	2022		official selection	
Sydney Women's International Film Festival	2022		official selection	
Kamianets-Podilskyi International Film Festival BRUKIVKA	2022		official selection	
Hollywood Florida Film Festival	2022		official selection	
Ukraina Festiwal Filmowy	2022		official selection	
