= Brothers: The Final Confession =

Brothers: the final confession
- International poster
- Braty. Ostannya spovid
- Directed by: Viktoria Trofimenko
- Written by: Victoria Trofimenko; Torgny Lindgren
- Screenplay by: Viktoria Trofimenko
- Based on: Sweetness by Torgny Lindgren
- Produced by: Maxim Asadchiy; Thom Palmen; Igor Savychenko; Victoria Trofimenko
- Starring: Nataliya Polovynka; Oleg Mosiychuk; Viktor Demertash
- Edited by: Tania Khodakivska
- Music by: Svyastolav Lunyov
- Production company: Pronto Film
- Distributed by: 86PROKAT
- Release date: 28 November 2013 (Goa)
- Running time: 120 minutes
- Country: Ukraine
- Language: Ukrainian
- Box office: $2 million

Brothers: The Final Confession (Ukrainian: «Брати. Остання сповідь», romanized: Braty. Ostannia spovid) is a 2013 Ukrainian drama film directed by Viktoria Trofimenko. The film based on Torgny Lindgren's novel Sweetness, which was published in 1995.

The film was presented at more than twenty film festivals, including three "A" class film forums in Goa, Shanghai and Moscow. On the last one it received the Film Crytics Prize and Best Actress Award for Natalka Polovynka.

The world premiere took place on 28 November 2013 in the main competition at the International Film Festival of India in Goa. In Ukraine, the film was presented at the international film festival "Molodist" on 18 September 2014, and come out in wide release on 24 September 2015.

== Plot ==
The film is a psychological drama developing on the highlands of the Carpathian Mountains. Two helpless old men, brothers, desperately trying to keep up competition with each other in order to prolong their lives. Even though their bodies are decaying and both are sick, the one still wants to outlive the other. But one day a woman enters their remote dwelling.

== Cast ==
- Mykola Bereza as Young Voytko
- Viktor Demertash as Old Stanislav
- Yuri Denysenkov as Saint Christopher
- Roman Lutskiy as Young Stanislav
- Oleg Mosijchuk as Old Voytko
- Nataliya Polovynka as Writer
- Veronika Shostak as Yvha
- Orest Yagish as Demiyon
