= Oreste Crisostomi =

Italian filmmaker

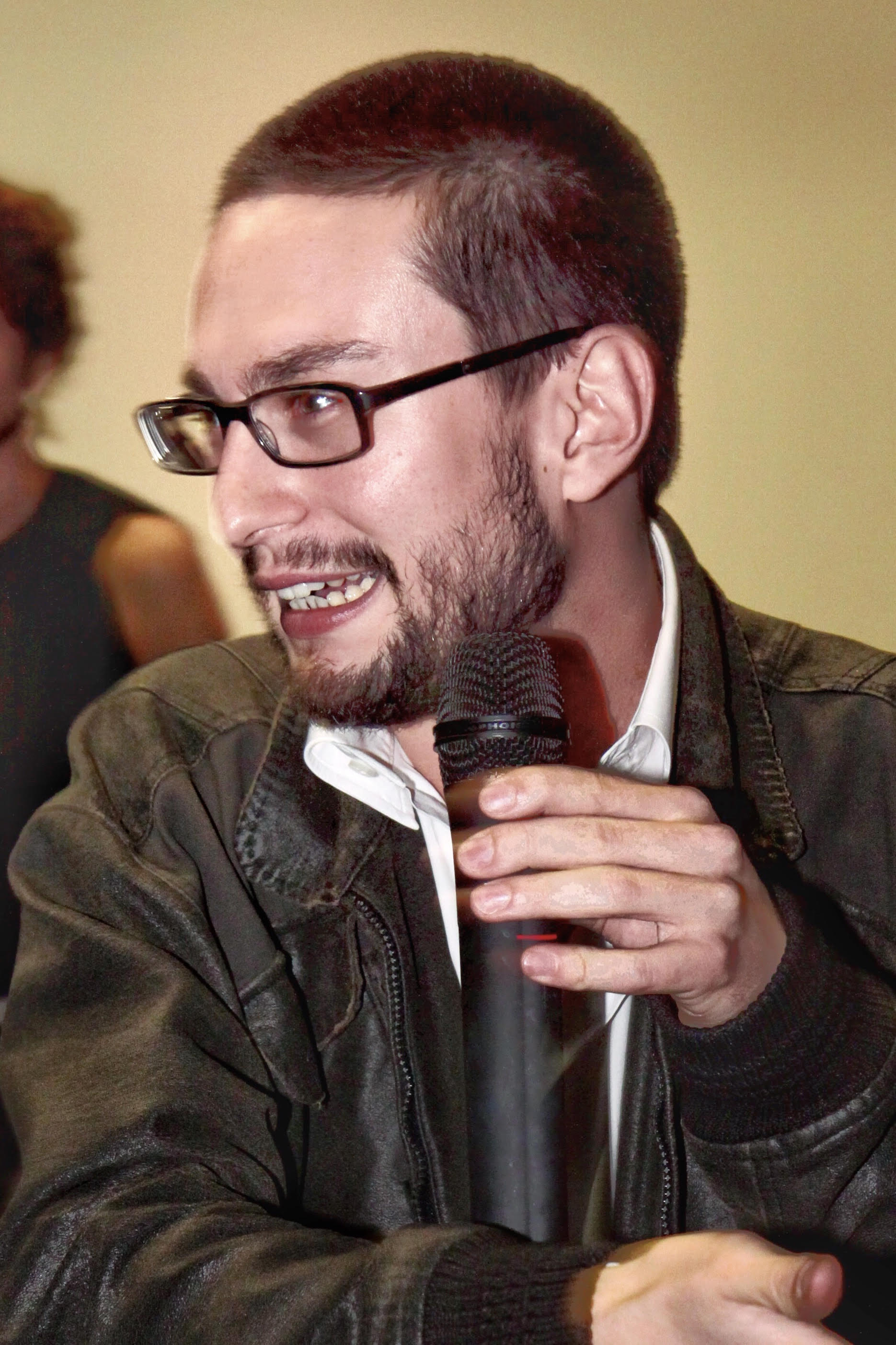
- Crisostomi in 2017
- Born: 21 August 1982 (age 44); Terni, Italy
- Occupations: Director, screenwriter
- Years active: 2010–present

Oreste Crisostomi (born 21 August 1982), is an Italian filmmaker. He is particularly known as the writer and artistic director of the critically acclaimed documentary Fuori fuoco (Out of focus).

== Personal life ==
He was born and raised in Terni. Since 2011, he has been carrying out constant cultural activities with the inmates from Terni penitentiary, where he made the documentary Fuori fuoco.

== Career ==
He made his debut as a director and screenwriter in 2010 with the feature film Alice, previewed at the Flaiano Prizes, starring Catherine Spaak. During the 2011/12 season, he made the play Io as an author and director. The play is inspired by Pierre Rivière's memoir, a case of parricide from the 19th century. In 2013, he was appointed director of the Film Festival Popoli e Religioni. In 2014 and 2015, he worked on the production of Asino, a documentary film by Anatoly Vasiliev. In 2018, his collective documentary project Fuori fuoco, made with the inmates from Terni penitentiary, was premiered at the Perugia International Journalism Festival, screened at the Chamber of Deputies and at the Festival dei Due Mondi. In 2021, he made the documentary Give Me the End You're At, a production of Associazione Museo Nazionale del Cinema, as a screenwriter and director.

== Filmography ==
Year	Film	Role	Genre
2010	Alice	Director, writer	First feature
2018	Fuori fuoco	Writer, artistic director	Documentary
2021	Give Me the End You're At	Writer, director	Documentary
