= Nevada Women's Film Festival =

Film festival

- Location: Las Vegas, Nevada, U.S.
- Started: 2015
- Founded by: Nikki Corda
- Most recent: 2024
- Website: nwffest.com

Nevada Women's Film Festival is an annual film festival in Las Vegas, Nevada.

== History ==
College of Southern Nevada film professor Nikki Corda founded the festival in 2015. In its inaugural year, 730 films from over 70 countries were submitted and 35 were selected, and the event was only for one day.

The festival held most screening events at the Origen Museum at Springs Preserve. Corda said the festival uses the Bechdel test when selecting narrative films. In 2019, the festival screened 45 films from 10 countries. In 2020, it went virtual because of the COVID-19 pandemic. In 2021, the festival screened 58 films from 20 countries and featured live stream and in person events. In 2023, over 100 films from 22 countries were selected.

=== Nevada Woman of Achievement Award ===
- Diana Eden (2018)
- Susan Anton (2019)
- Jemma Jones (2021)

=== Notable films ===
- A Girl Walks Home Alone at Night
- Dolores
- Electrick Children
- Mother of Apostles
- Move Me No Mountain
- The Mustang
- Night Comes On

=== Notable attendees ===
- Ana Lily Amirpour
- Ariann Black
- Alexis Krasilovsky
- Ry Russo-Young
