= Olhopil, Vinnytsia Oblast =

Village in Haisyn Raion, Ukraine

Olhopil Ольгопіль
- Village
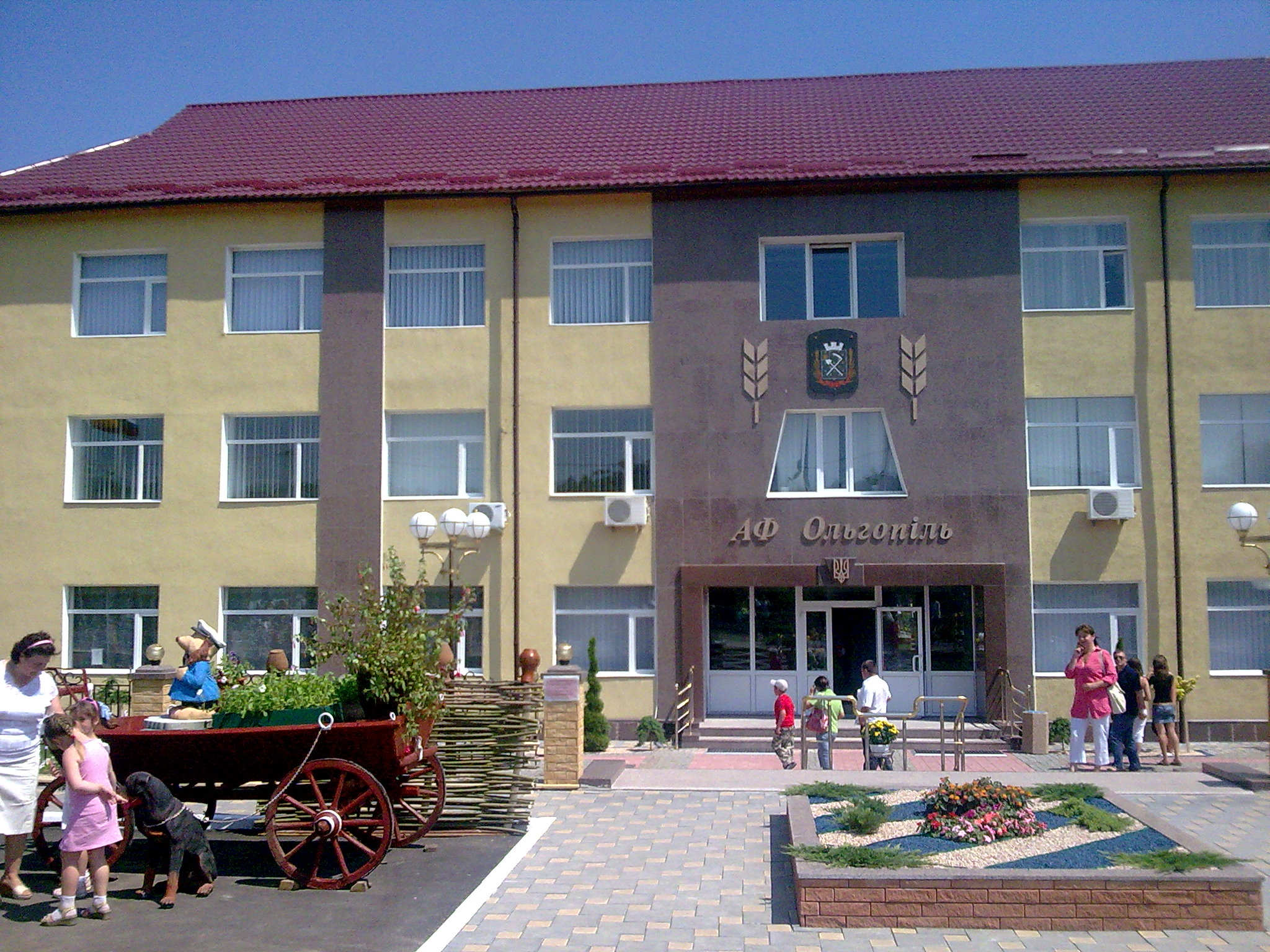

- Location in Ukraine Olhopil (Ukraine)
- Country: Ukraine
- Oblast: Vinnytsia Oblast
- Raion: Haisyn Raion
- Hromada: Olhopil rural hromada
- First mentioned: 1780

Population (1926)
  - Total: 2,172

Olhopil (Ukrainian: Ольгопіль) is a village in Haisyn Raion of Vinnytsia Oblast, Ukraine. It is located in the historic region of Podolia.

== History ==
In the area, local residents sought refuge during the Tatar and haydamak raids. Roguska Czeczelnicka (Ukrainian: Рогузка Чечельницька, Rohuzka Chechelnytska or Рогузки-Чечельницькі), a private village of the Lubomirski family, administratively located in the Bracław Voivodeship in the Lesser Poland Province of Poland, was first known since 1780. It was annexed by Russia in the Second Partition of Poland in 1793.

In 1795 it was renamed Olgopol (Russian: Ольгополь) by Catherine II in the name of her granddaughter, Olga Pavlovna. It was also known as Holopol. In 1797, the uyezd seat was moved from Chechelnik to Olhopil. It was administratively located in the Podolia Governorate. The Jewish population in 1847 was 247. As of 1876, the town was home to 176 nobles and 41 clergy. A distillery was established in 1876. In the 1880s, there were also a tallow candle factory and a brickworks. Several small annual fairs and a weekly market were held in the town.

Olhopil suffered heavily during the violence of the Russian Civil War. Jews in the town were attacked in 1919 by Ukrainian armed groups and by forces of Anton Denikin. In 1926, the Jewish population numbered 1,660, representing 76.4% of the town's population.

=== World War II and the Holocaust ===
Before the German invasion of the Soviet Union, approximately 650 Jews remained in Olgopol. German forces occupied the town on 26 July 1941; by that time, most of its Jewish residents had fled or been evacuated eastward. Approximately 100 to 150 Jews who remained were concentrated in a ghetto established in the town's Jewish quarter.

On 1 September 1941, Olgopol was incorporated into the Romanian-administered Transnistria Governorate. During September, several hundred Jews deported by the Romanian authorities from Bessarabia were brought to Olgopol and housed in the homes of local Jews and in the synagogue. Sources also record deportees from Bukovina in the ghetto. In May 1943, approximately 100 Romanian Jews who had previously been imprisoned as political prisoners at the Vapniarka concentration camp were transferred to the Olgopol ghetto. Among them was physician Arthur Kessler, who later described his imprisonment at Vapniarka and Olgopol in his memoir.

The Jews confined in Olgopol were required to wear a yellow Star of David and were subjected to forced labour. As elsewhere in Romanian-controlled Transnistria, the ghetto population lived under severe restrictions and depended largely on its own resources for food and shelter. Romanian authorities established approximately 150 improvised camps and ghettos across Transnistria, where Jews deported from Bessarabia and Bukovina were confined together with local Ukrainian Jews. Tens of thousands died from hunger, exposure, disease, maltreatment and violence.

The Olgopol ghetto remained under Romanian administration until the Soviet advance into the region in 1944.

== Demographics ==
Historical population
Year	Pop.	±%
1876	6,922	—
1897	8,134	+17.5%

=== Language ===
Distribution of the population by native language according to the 2001 census:

Language	Percentage
Ukrainian	98.5%
Russian	1.3%
other/undecided	0.2%

According to the 1897 census, the population was 59.5% Ukrainian, 30.3% Jewish, 7.7% Russian, 1.1% Tatar, 0.85% Polish, 0.21% Chuvash, 0.12% Latvian.

== Notable people ==
- Nataliya Polovynka (born 1965), singer and actress
