= Andy Siege =

Kenyan film director

- Born: Andreas Madjid Siege; 5 March 1985 (age 40); Nairobi, Kenya
- Education: Bachelor of Arts in Creative Writing from Vancouver Island University, Master of Arts in Contemporary European Politics from the University of Bath, Certificate in Motion Picture Production from Pacific Film And Media Academy
- Known for: Beti and Amare (2014)
- Notable work: Beti and Amare (2014)
- Awards: River Admiration Award; 2014

Andy Siege (born Andreas Madjid Siege, 1985, in Nairobi, Kenya) is a director and author. His debut feature film Beti and Amare (2014), which he directed, wrote, cinematographed, edited and acted in, was made with a 14,000 euro budget. So far, it has been nominated for the Golden St. George Award at the 36th Moscow International Film Festival and has been featured in the Official Selection of film festivals around the world.

== Beti and Amare at International Film Festivals ==
- World Premiere : 36th Moscow International Film Festival 19–28 June 2014, Nominated for "Golden St George" (Official Competition)
- African Premiere: 35th Durban International Film Festival 17–27 July 2014 (Official Competition)
- North American Premiere: 38th Montreal World Film Festival 25 August – 1 September 2014 Focus on World Cinema Section (Official Selection)
- European Premiere: 58th BFI London Film Festival 8–19 October 2014, DARE Category (Official Selection)
- American Premiere: 4th Silent River Film Festival (L.A) 17–20 October 2014 (Official Selection) Awarded the River Admiration Award.
- Nigerian Premiere: 4th African International Film Festival. 9 November–November 16 (Official Selection)
- Bahamas Premiere: 11th Bahamas International Film Festival 4 December–December 14 (Official Selection)
- Palm Springs: 26th Palm Springs International Film Festival 2 January–January 12 (Official Selection)
- Los Angeles: 24th Pan African Film Festival 5 February – 16 February (Official Selection)
- German Premiere: 7th International Lichter Film-fest 17 March – 22 March (Long Narrative Competition)
- Egypt Premiere: 4th Luxor International Film Festival 16 March – 21 March (Long Narrative Competition) Awarded the Artistic Achievement Award
- Dutch Premiere: 28th Imagine Film Festival 9 April – 18 April (First Feature Long Narrative Competition)
- Polish Premiere: 10th Afry Kamera African Film Festival 24 April – 29 March (Official Selection)
- Seattle Premiere: Seattle International Film Festival 2015 (Eligible to win Silver Space Needle)
- Hessen Premiere: Hessischer Filmpreis 2015 (Nominated for best Film)
- Berlin Premiere: Verband der Deutschen Filmkritik 2017 (Nominated for best Debutfilm and Best Score) Awarded Best Score.
