= Paolo Consorti =

Italian artist and film director

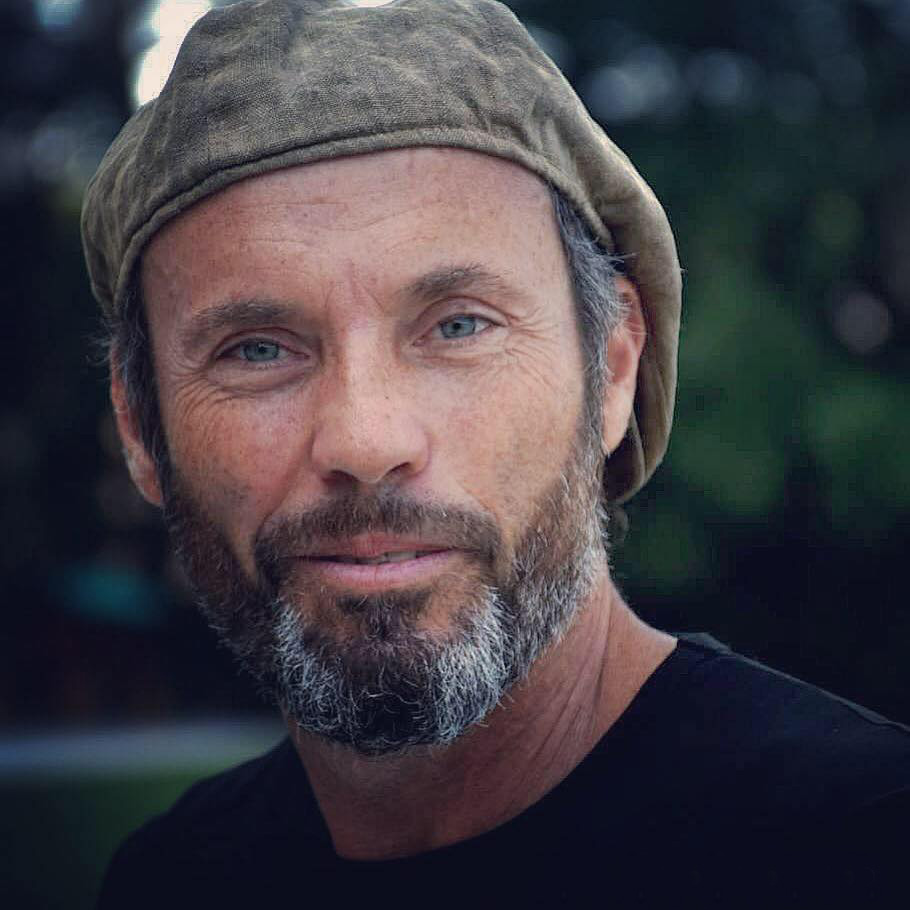
- Paolo Consorti in 2021
- Born: San Benedetto del Tronto, Macerata, Italy
- Education: School of Fine Arts, Italy

Paolo Consorti is an Italian artist and film director.

== Early life and education ==
Paolo Consorti was born in San Benedetto del Tronto, Macerata, Italy.

He attended the Academy of Fine Arts in Macerata, and while there, he participated in some cinematographic collaborations with Sergei Bondarchuk.

== Career ==
In 1991, Consorti debuted his first solo exposition at the Palazzo Ducale di Urbino. In 1992, the philosopher Hans-Georg Gadamer made a comparison between Consorti and Hieronymus Bosch on the basis of their shared "contrast between pictorial and dramatic balance of modern and post-modern". In 1994, the art critic Pierre Restany called Consorti's work the "emergence of a sublime post-modern style".

In 1996, he participated in the XII Quadrennial National Art exhibit at the Palazzo delle Esposizioni in Rome.

In 2003, he took part in the First Prague Biennale at the Veletrzni Palac in Prague, and the next year he participated in the XIV Quadrennial National Art exhibit at the Palazzo della Promotrice in Turin and was included in the Zanichelli Art encyclopedia. In 2006, Consorti took part in "Garten Eden – Der Garten in der Kunst seit 1900" in Emden, Germany, and was one of the Italian artists chosen to represent Italy in the nature and metamorphosis expositions at the Urban Planning Exhibition Center in Shanghai and the Millennium Art Museum in Beijing. In 2008, he showed his work at the World Olympic Fine Arts Museum in Beijing and was invited to the Moscow Biennial for Young Art at the Ruarts Foundation of Moscow. Also in 2008, he was picked for the Farnesiana Young Collection at the Italian Ministry of Foreign Affairs, exhibiting the works of young Italian artists most representative of the national scene, and he was included in the young Italian art Top 100 published by Flash Art. In 2009, Consorti created a large fresco of the nativity, electronically projected onto a public square in Assisi. In 2010, he created some music videos for the Italian edition of the TV show X Factor.

In 2011, he took part in the 54th Venice Biennale at the Italian Pavilion, where he presented the first performance in his Rebellio Patroni series. This was a work in progress that was composed of different performances in which the patron saints of Italian cities acted with paradoxical actions in the present time. The act included the participation of Elio, from the band Elio e le Storie Tese, who played the part of Francis of Assisi. He followed this by a performance at the Madre Museum in Naples, with actor Giobbe Covatta playing San Gennaro. He has also done solo expositions in Melbourne, Berlin, Amsterdam, Minneapolis, Hamburg, New York, Marshall and Tokyo. In June 2012, he was scheduled to bring "Rebellio patroni" in a major solo show with paintings, installations, video and performance at Palazzo Reale of Milan.

== Publications ==
- Gianluca Marziani, Paolo Consorti, Castelvecchi Arte, Rome, 1999
- Gianluca Marziani, Melting Pop, Castelvecchi Arte, Rome, 2001
- Luca Beatrice, Dizionario della Giovane Arte Italiana, Giancarlo Politi Editore, Milan, 2003
- Giancarlo Politi, Helena Kontova, Prague Biennale 1: Peripheries become the Center, Giancarlo Politi Editore, Milan, 2003
- Gianluca Marziani, Melting Pop, Palazzo delle Papesse, Siena, Silvana Editoriale, Cinisiello Balsamo, Milan, 2003
- Edigeo, Enciclopedia dell’Arte Zanichelli, Zanichelli, Bologna, 2004
- Marisa Vescovo, Natura e metamorfosi, Urban Planning Exhibition Center, Shanghai – Millenium Art Museum, Beijing, Damiani, Bologna, 2006
- VV.AA., Europäischer monat der fotografie Berlin, Kulturprojekte, Berlin, 2006
- VV.AA., Collezione Farnesina – Experimenta, Ministero Affari Esteri, Gangemi Editore, Rome, 2008
- VV.AA., In Opera, sulle orme di Matteo Ricci, Palazzo Buonaccorsi, Edizioni Artemisia, 2010
- Vittorio Sgarbi, L’Arte non è cosa nostra: The Italian Pavilion at the 54th International Art Exhibition of the Venice Biennale, Skira, Milan, 2011
- Antonio Arévalo, Rebellio Patroni, Sant'Ambrogio e il piccolo Duomo, Palazzo Reale Milan, Silvana Editoriale 2012
- Premio Marche, Biennale d'Arte contemporanea, Edizioni Artemisia, 2018
- Premio Vasto, Opere dalla collezione, Edizioni Martintype, 2020
