= Torgny Lindgren =

Swedish writer (1938–2017)

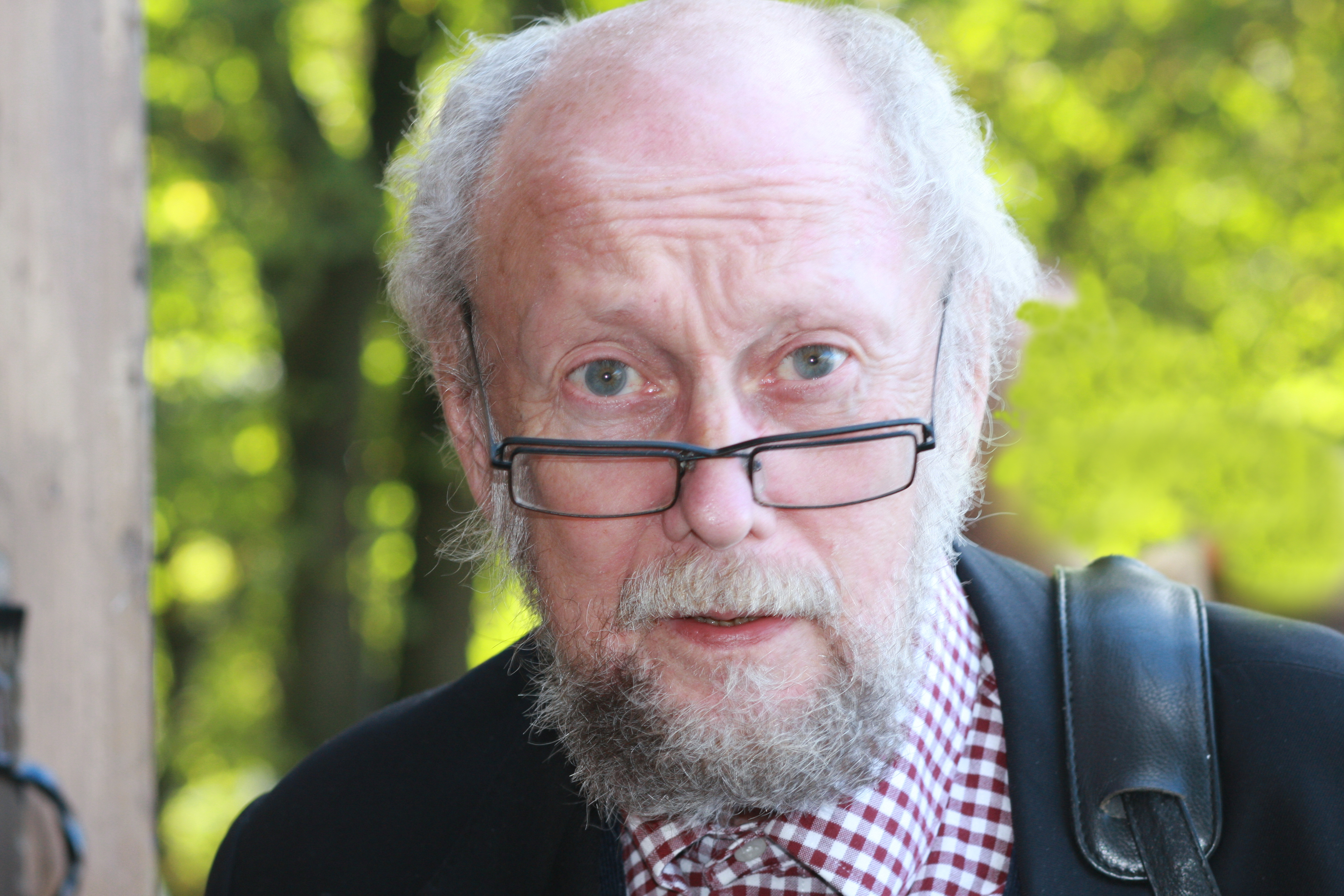
- Lindgren in Stavanger, Norway, in September 2009
- Born: Gustav Torgny Lindgren; 16 June 1938; Raggsjö, Norsjö, Västerbotten, Sweden
- Died: 16 March 2017 (aged 78); Rimforsa, Sweden
- Occupations: Poet, novelist
- Spouse: Stina
- Children: Aina; Ylva; Torgils
- Writing career
- Period: 1965–2017
- Notable works: The Way of a Serpent; Sweetness

Gustav Torgny Lindgren (16 June 1938 – 16 March 2017) was a Swedish writer.

Lindgren was the son of Andreas Lindgren and Helga Björk. He studied in Umeå to become a teacher and worked as a teacher until the middle of the 1970s. For several years he was active as a local politician for the Swedish Social Democratic Party. In the 1980s he converted to the Catholic faith.

Lindgren started out as a poet in 1965 but had to wait until 1982 for his breakthrough, with the novel The Way of a Serpent (Swedish: Ormens väg på hälleberget). Lindgren's work was translated into more than thirty languages and was one of Sweden's most internationally successful contemporary writers. He became a member of the Swedish Academy in 1991.

== The Way of a Serpent ==
The Way of a Serpent tells the story of a farmer family in a poverty-stricken region in the northern parts of Sweden in the nineteenth century. The family formerly owned its land but had to sell it cheap during a succession of years of famine. The new owner collects his rent as long as there is money in the household, and exploits the women when there is no money.

The novel was made into a film by Bo Widerberg in 1986.

== Bibliography ==
- Plåtsax, hjärtats instrument (1965)
- Dikter från Vimmerby (1970)
- Hur skulle det vara om man vore Olof Palme? (1971)
- Hallen (1975). ISBN 91-1-751161-5
- Brännvinsfursten (1979). A book about Lars Olsson Smith. ISBN 91-1-791042-0
- The Way of a Serpent (Ormens väg på hälleberget) (1982/1990). ISBN 91-1-811692-2 / ISBN 0-00-271817-0
- Merabs skönhet (1983). ISBN 91-1-831412-0
- Övriga frågor (1983). ISBN 91-7448-214-9
- Bathsheba (Bat Seba) (1984/1989). ISBN 91-1-841262-9 / ISBN 0-00-271271-7
- Legender (1986). ISBN 91-1-861122-2
- Skrämmer dig minuten (1986)
- Light (Ljuset) (1987/1992). ISBN 91-1-871472-2 / ISBN 0-00-271171-0
- Till Sanningens Lov (In Praise of Truth) (1991)
- Sweetness (Hummelhonung) (1995/2000). ISBN 91-1-912432-5 / ISBN 1-86046-656-7
- I Brokiga Blads vatten (1999). ISBN 91-7263-086-8
- Hash (Pölsan) (2002/2005). ISBN 91-1-301044-1 / ISBN 1-58567-651-9
- Dorés bibel (Doré's Bible) (2005).
- The Stories (Berättelserna) (2003). ISBN 91-1-301208-8
- Norrlands akvavit (2007)
- Minnen (2010)
- Klingsor (2014)

== Awards and honours ==
Lindgren received honorary doctorates from Linköping University (in 1990) and Umeå University (in 2000). He also received a number of other awards, including the following.

- 1986 – Prix Femina étranger (for Bathsheba)
- 1995 – The August Prize (for Sweetness)
- 2000 – The Selma Lagerlöf Prize
- 2001 – Ordre des Arts et des Lettres
- 2002 – Litteris et Artibus
- 2004 – De Nios Stora Pris

Cultural offices
Preceded by Ture Johannisson	Swedish Academy, Seat No 9; 1991-2017	Succeeded by Jayne Svenungsson
