= Gustav Sandgren =

Swedish writer

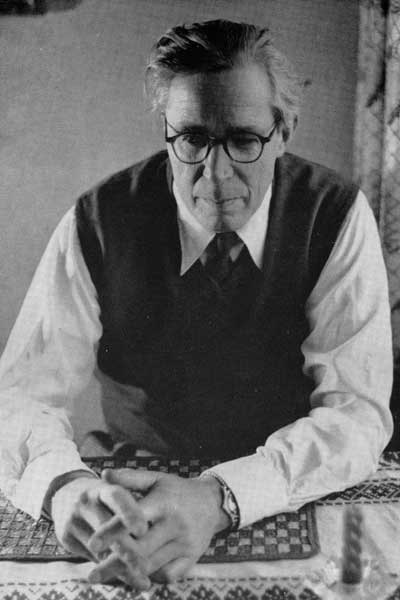
- Gustav Sandgren, 1960
- Born: August 20, 1904; Västra Stenby; Motala Municipality; Östergötland, Sweden
- Died: August 11, 1983 (aged 78); Lidingö, Stockholm County, Sweden
- Occupation: Author
- Spouse: Titti Lindstedt (m. 1935; div. 1945)
- Partner: Ria Wägner
- Writing career
- Pen name: Gabriel Linde

Gustav Sandgren (20 August 1904 – 11 August 1983) was a Swedish writer and translator. He was a member of the Fem unga group of proletarian writers.

== Early life ==
Sandgren was born in 1904 in Västra Stenby in Östergötland. Sandgren's parents were Oskar Jakobsson Sandgren and Karolina (born Adolfsson), who gave their son a poor but happy childhood. The father was a handyman and worked as a cooper, among other things, and was in addition to his work a musician and violin maker. The young Sandgren was surrounded by folk music and folk tales, becoming a skilled violinist over the years. He was fascinated by folklore, mystery and dreams.

After elementary school, Sandgren became an industrial worker and worked for five years at the Cloetta chocolate factory in Ljungsbro outside Linköping. From 1926 to 1929, he attended folk high school and then became a full-time writer. By the time of his death in 1983, he had written nearly 80 books. He married Titti Lindstedt in 1935 and lived in Björknäs near Hållsviken, west of Trosa in Södermanland, from 1937 until the early 1940s. He met Ria Wägner in Stockholm in 1944 and moved in with her the following year. They then lived for nearly forty years in an apartment on Lidingö in Stockholm County. He is buried in the memorial grove at Lidingö Cemetery.

== Writing ==
His debut came with the novel Gunnar (1929), which had previously been serialized in the newspaper Stormklockan. Gustav Sandgren preferred to write novels, four of which had autobiographical elements: Du bittra bröd (1935), David blir människa (1943), Liv ge oss svar (1949), and Ungdomens hunger (1960). But he also wrote poetry, travelogues (some together with Ria Wägner), fairy tales, short story collections, and books for children and young adults. He made his big breakthrough with Skymningssagor (Twilight Tales, 1936), a collection of stories with fairy tale motifs that was actually aimed at readers of all ages, but which the publisher chose to release as a collection of short stories for adults. As a translator, he has translated works by Tarjei Vesaas into Swedish, among others.

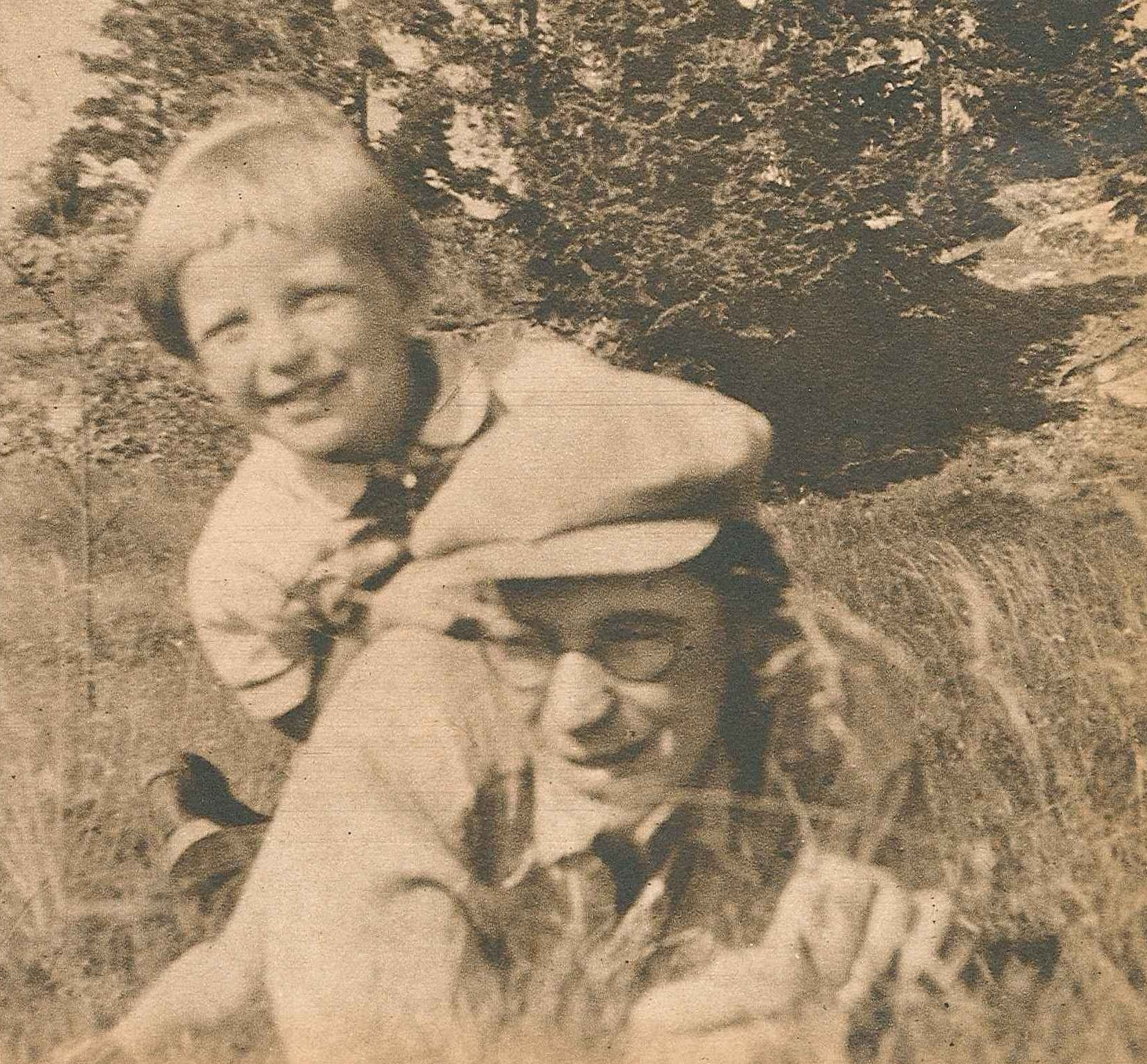
Gustav Sandgren with a son from his first marriage (1943)

Together with Harry Martinson, Artur Lundkvist, Erik Asklund and Josef Kjellgren, he formed the literary group Fem unga ("Five young ones"). During the 1950s and 1960s, Sandgren wrote a number of children's books that have become very popular; these are the books about Kajsa Rutlapp and Katten Jaum (Jaum the cat). It is also worth mentioning that Sandgren as early as the 1930s wrote two adventure books set in a science fiction environment: Den okända faran (The Unknown Danger, 1933) and Resan till Venus (The Journey to Venus, 1934). They were written under the pseudonym Gabriel Linde. Sandgren took the surname Linde from the cottage of the same name where he settled in the summer of 1933. It still exists today and is located just south of Edeby säteri (Edeby Manor) near the village of Norrvrå in Hölö parish, Södermanland.

== Personal life ==
Sandgren married Titti Lindstedt in 1935. They lived in Björknäs at Hållsviken west of Trosa in Södermanland. In 1945 he left his wife for Ria Wägner, with whom he lived for forty years at Lidingö, Stockholm County. The couple had a daughter, author Veronica Wägner, born in 1947.
