= Harry Martinson =

Swedish writer

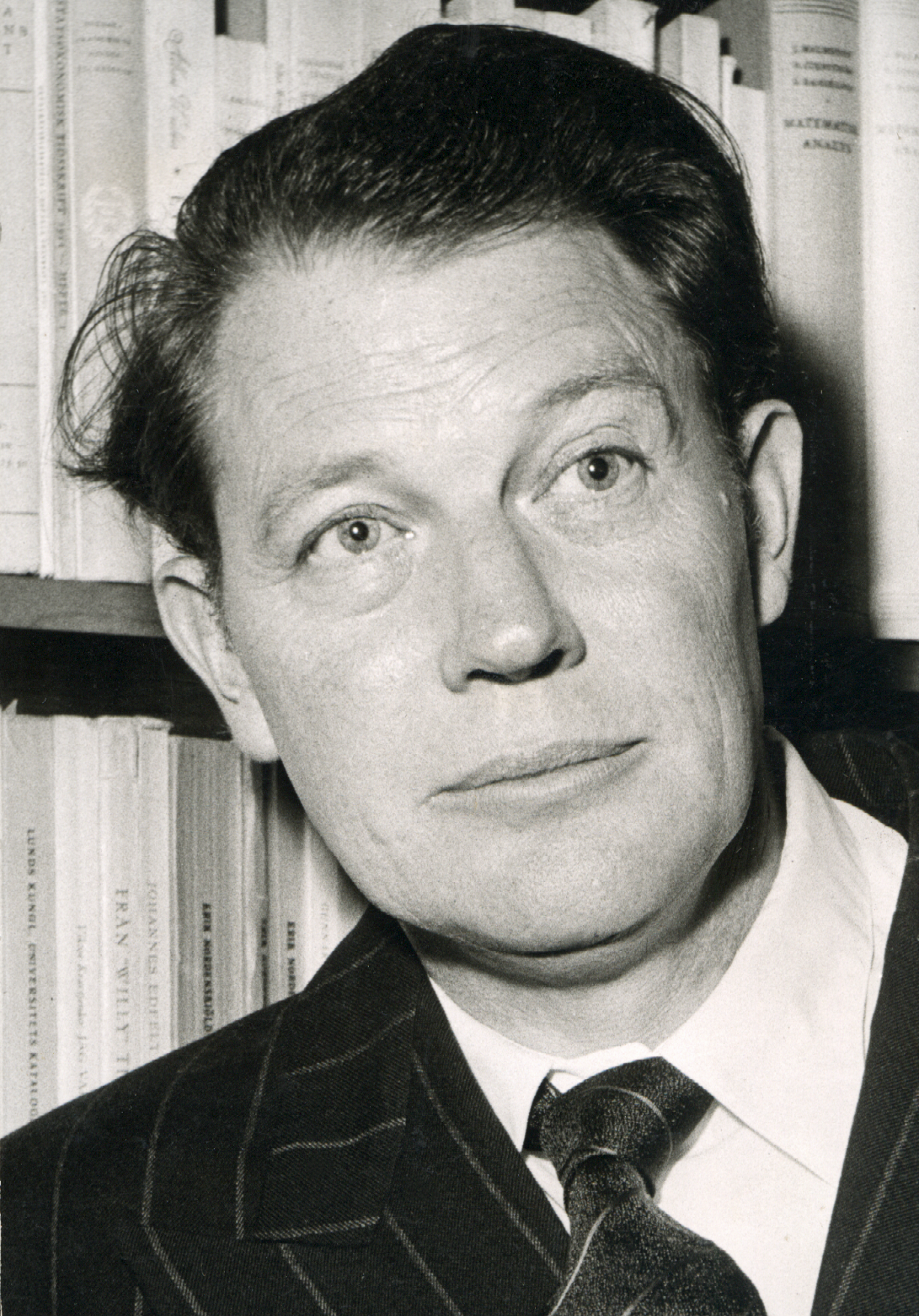
- Harry Martinson
- Born: 6 May 1904; Jämshög, Sweden
- Died: 11 February 1978 (aged 73); Stockholm, Sweden
- Spouses: Moa Martinson (1929–1940); Ingrid Lindcrantz (1942–1978)
- Writing career
- Notable awards: Nobel Prize in Literature; 1974 (shared with Eyvind Johnson)

Harry Martinson (6 May 1904 – 11 February 1978) was a Swedish writer, poet and former sailor. In 1949 he was elected into the Swedish Academy. He was awarded a joint Nobel Prize in Literature in 1974 together with fellow Swede Eyvind Johnson "for writings that catch the dewdrop and reflect the cosmos". The choice was controversial, as both Martinson and Johnson were members of the academy.

He has been called "the great reformer of 20th-century Swedish poetry, the most original of the writers called 'proletarian'." One of his most noted works is the poetic cycle Aniara, which is a story of the spacecraft Aniara that during a journey through space loses its course and subsequently floats on without destination. The book was published in 1956 and became an opera in 1959 composed by Karl-Birger Blomdahl. The cycle has been described as "an epic story of man's fragility and folly".

== Life ==
=== Childhood ===
Martinson was born in Jämshög, Blekinge County in south-eastern Sweden. Born Harry Edmund Olofsson, he was the fifth child of middle class parents who ran a small shop in the village Nyteboda and had four older and two younger sisters. At a young age he lost both his parents, his father died of tuberculosis in 1910 and a year later his mother emigrated to Portland, Oregon leaving behind her children, whereafter Martinson was placed as a foster child (Kommunalbarn) in the Swedish countryside. He was moved between different homes and alternated between working for his foster parents and attending elementary school, where he often received excellent grades. Martinson would later depict his childhood in the novel Flowering Nettle (1935), and its continuation Vägen ut ('The Way Out', 1936).

=== Years at sea and vagrancy (1920–1927) ===
At the age of sixteen Harry Martinson, as he now called himself, had run away and signed onto a ship in Gothenburg as an able seaman. The steam ship's journey reached France, Ireland and Scotland, but after returning to Stockholm Martinson signed off as he could not afford the necessary winter clothes. He then spent eighteen months as a vagrant, eventually reaching as far as Umeå in north-east Sweden and then Tromsø in northern Norway. In June 1921 he was arrested for vagrancy in Lundagård park, Lund. In March 1922 he signed on as a stoker on a steam ship that sailed to Norway and Iceland, but after two months he ran away in Belgium. He stayed in Antwerpen, Belgium for a while before signing on to a ship destined for the United States, where he hoped to meet his mother, and then to a Greek ship sailing to South America. He spent some time as a seaman in Brazil and then signed on to a ship that sailed from Rio de Janeiro to Cape Town, and then further to Bombay. In Bombay he again ran away, before signing on to another ship that sailed back to Europe.

Troubled by lung problems Martinson set ashore in Sweden on his 23rd birthday in May 1927. Martinson would later depict his years as a seaman in several acclaimed books, including Kap farväl! (1933), which was a critical and commercial success and the first of his books to be translated to English (Cape Farewell, 1934).

=== Literary career ===
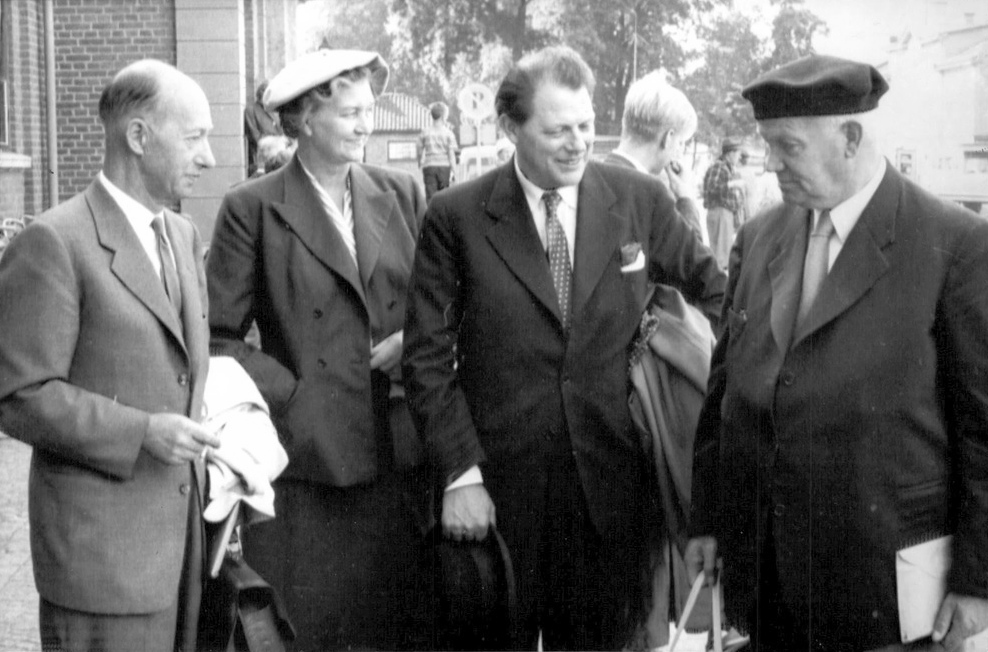
Harry Martinson (second from right) at a writers meeting in Karlstad in 1958, with authors Eyvind Johnson (left) and Gabriel Jönsson (right).

Around 1927, Martinson began his literary career and had several poems published in different publications. The same year he met Artur Lundkvist, who introduced him to modernist poets such as Elmer Diktonius, Carl Sandburg and Edgar Lee Masters. In September 1929, Martinson's first book of poems called Spökskepp ("Ghost Ship") was published by Albert Bonniers förlag. Together with Lundkvist, Gustav Sandgren, Erik Asklund and Josef Kjellgren he authored the anthology Fem unga (Five Youths), which introduced modernism in Swedish literature. His next collection of poems, Nomad (1931) featured a wide scope of themes and literary styles, including nature poems, impressions from his sea travels and childhood memories and mixed traditional rhymed verse with modernist free verse and epic prose poems. It was widely acclaimed by contemporary critics and is regarded as Martinson's literary breakthrough. It was followed by two prose books in which Martinson recalled his years as a seaman, Resor utan mål ("Aimless Journeys", 1932) and Kap farväl! (Cape Farewell, 1933) which further established Martinson as one of the leading Swedish authors of his generation.

After a poorly received collection of poems, Natur ("Nature", 1934), Martinson found great success as a novelist with the semi-autobiographical Nässlorna blomma (Flowering Nettle) in 1935, in which he depicted his childhood. It was a critical and widely read success that at the end of 1935 had been published in three editions, and has since been translated into more than thirty languages. The story was continued in the novel Vägen ut ("The Way Out") in 1936, which was another critical and commercial success.

The commercial success of his recent books and several scholarships awarded for his writing allowed Martinson to buy a farm in Södermanland, where he lived with his wife, the proletarian novelist Moa Martinson, and her sons. During this time he wrote a trilogy of essay books that focused on nature: Svärmare och harkrank (1937), Midsommardalen (1938) and Det enkla och det svåra (1939).

In late 1939, Martinson was engaged in the Finland Winter War as a representative of the Swedish Finland Committee. In winter 1940 he travelled in Sweden and Finland together with five other Swedish authors in a campaign to recruit volunteers to the Finnish army. Martinson himself took part as a volunteer in the war. In March 1940 he spent nine days at the heavily attacked front in Salla as a courier for the Finnish troops. Martinson wrote about his experiences in the book Verklighet till döds ("Reality to Death"), which was published in 1941.

Passad (1945), influenced by Chinese poetry, was Martinson's first collection of poems in eleven years, became a critical and commercial success and his most successful book of poems to date. The novel Vägen till Klockrike (The Road to Klockrike, 1948) was another huge success, and in 1949 Martinson became the first proletarian writer to be elected a member of the Swedish Academy.

In 1953 Martinson published Cikada ("Cicada"), a collection of poems which was another critical success and his best-selling poetry book to date. Much of the collection featured familiar themes in Martinson's writing such as nature, didactic poems and criticism of the modern society, but the last section in the book was something new. The cycle "Sången om Doris och Mima" ("The Song About Doris and Mima"), a science fiction like story of a spacecraft evacuating people from the destroyed earth which loses its course and subsequently floats on without destination. Martinson would later expand the cycle to his most famous work, Aniara.

Aniara was published in October 1956 to unanimous critical acclaim and much public interest. It was later adapted to an opera by Karl-Birger Blomdahl and Erik Lindegren, and the 2018 film Aniara.

Martinson worked on a follow-up to Aniara called Doriderna which was going to be about the people left on earth. In the meantime he published Gräsen i Thule ("The Grass in Thule", 1958), a collection of mainly nature poems that was also well received by contemporary critics and readers. His next book Vagnen ("The Wagon", 1960), a collection of poems which largely was a criticism of the modern society and its technology, was however not well received by contemporary critics. Sensitive to criticism, Martinson declared that no more of his poems would be published during his lifetime, but a few other works were published in the 1960s, such as the play Tre knivar från Wei ("Three Knives from Wei", 1964) set in 7th century China, which was staged by Ingmar Bergman in the Royal Dramatic Theatre in Stockholm in 1964. In 1971 Martinson returned as a poet with Dikter om ljus och mörker (Poems About Light and Darkness), which was followed by a collection of nature poems Tuvor (Tufts) in 1973.

=== Nobel Prize in Literature ===
On 3 October 1974 the Swedish Academy announced that the Nobel Prize in Literature that year should be awarded jointly to Harry Martinson and Eyvind Johnson. Harry Martinson was awarded with the citation "for writings that catch the dewdrop and reflect the cosmos." The prize decision sparked heavy criticism in the Swedish press against the Swedish Academy for awarding the Nobel Prize to two of its own members. Although there were also positive reactions to the prize decision, the sensitive Martinson took the negative comments aimed at the Academy personally and found it hard to enjoy the recognition.

=== Personal life ===
From 1929 to 1940, he was married to novelist Moa Martinson, prominent as a feminist and proletarian author, whom he met through a Stockholm anarchist newspaper, Brand. He travelled to the Soviet Union in 1934. He and Moa were divorced due to her criticism of his lack of political commitment. Harry married Ingrid Lindcrantz (1916–1994) in 1942.

=== Later life and death ===
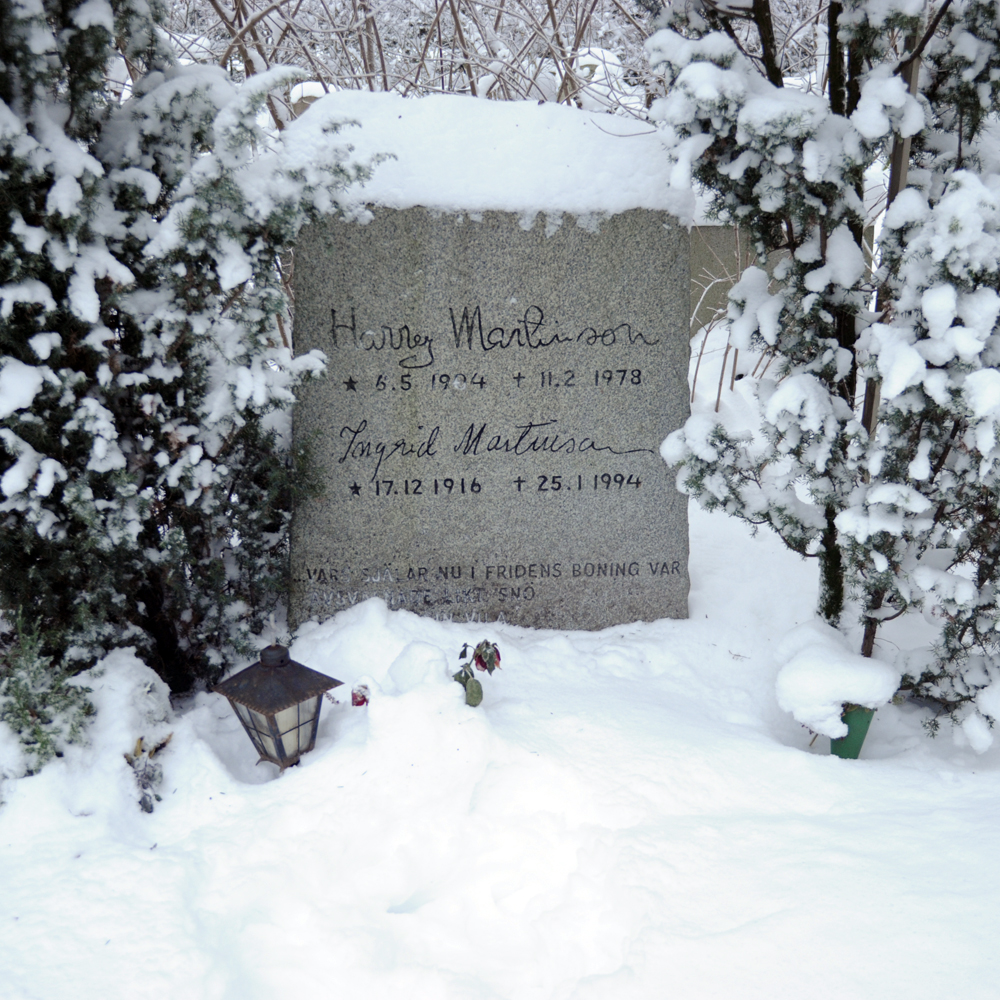
The headstone on Martinson's grave in Silverdal, Sollentuna – north of Stockholm

Throughout the 1960s Martinson suffered from bad health and depressions. He was generally seen as an old-fashioned author by the contemporary cultural world and became less productive as a writer. The sensitive Martinson found it hard to cope with the criticism following his 1974 Nobel Prize award in Literature, and died by suicide on 11 February 1978 at the Karolinska University Hospital in Stockholm after cutting his stomach open with a pair of scissors in what has been described as a "hara-kiri-like manner". He was buried in Sollentuna on 24 February 1978.

== Literary themes ==
Martinson's poetry, characterized by linguistic innovation and a frequent use of metaphors, combined an acute eye for, and love of nature, with a deeply felt humanism. His poetry was noted for rich imagery with precise observations that emphazised details. In his later writing nature and the earth became increasingly important motifs. During the 1930s he developed a mastery in describing nature in both prose and poetry and was especially noted for his short nature poems with precise observations. In the autobiographical novels Nässlorna blomma (Flowering Nettle, 1935) and Vägen ut (The Way Out, 1936) Martinson tells about his childhood. Martinson had a strong interest in science which was a prominent influence in his work. In his book Verklighet till döds (Reality to Death, 1940) written during World War II Martinson criticized contemporary social conditions and technological development. Criticism of modern culture is also a theme in Martinson's philosophical vagabond novel Vägen till Klockrike (1948; English translation The Road, 1950) and the collection of poems Passad (1945).

In his later writing Martinson developed a new major theme based on his increasing interest in outer space and the cosmic. This came to most distinct expression in Aniara (1956), a poetic space epic that became Martinson's best known work. In his late work criticism of modern life and its technology came to an even stronger expression in his 1960 poetry collection Vagnen (The Wagon).

== Legacy ==
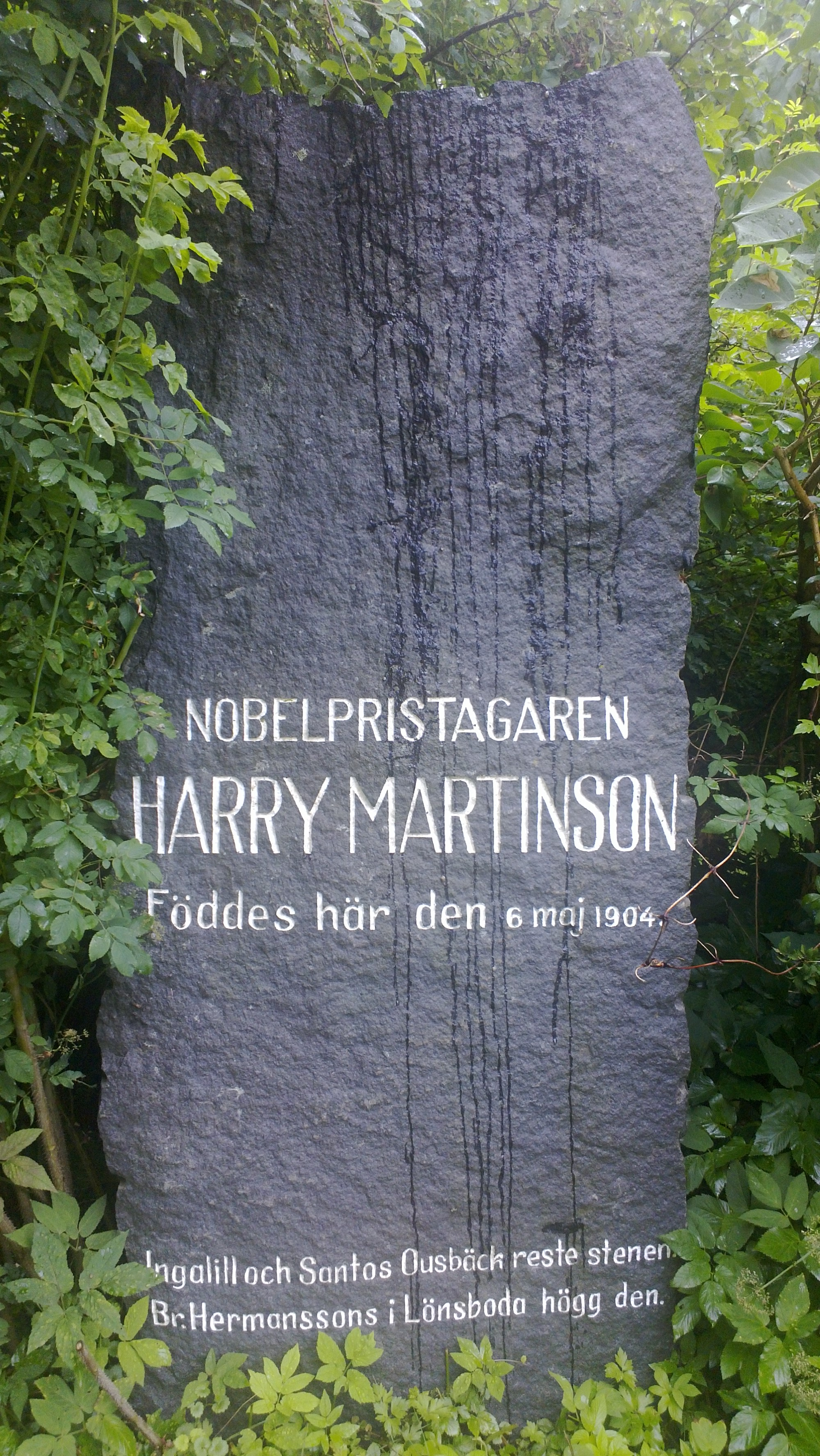
A stone monument at Harry Martinson's birthplace in Nyteboda. The text translated to English reads "The Nobel Prize laureate Harry Martinson was born here on 6 May 1904."

After his death, many hailed Martinson as one of the greatest Swedish authors since August Strindberg. His 1945 poem "Besök på observatorium" ("Visit to an Observatory") was included on the Voyager Golden Record, launched aboard the Voyager spacecraft in 1977. The poem was read by Sweden's ambassador to the United Nations, Anders Thunborg, as part of the record's greetings from UN delegates. His 1973 nature poem "De blomster som i marken bor" is included in the Swedish Book of Psalms.

The 100th anniversary of Martinson's birth was celebrated around Sweden in 2004, as were the 50th anniversary of Martinson receiving the Nobel prize and the 120th anniversary of his birth in 2024.

The international Cikada Prize is awarded in memory of Harry Martinson since that year. His best known works Aniara, Flowering Nettle and Vägen till klockrike have been translated to over a dozen different languages. The Harry Martinson Society was founded in 1984 and awards the Harry Martinson Prize to individuals or organisations working in the spirit of Harry Martinson. The Swedish Academy awards a scholarship in memory of Harry Martinson to an author writing in Swedish.

== Bibliography ==
Titles in English where known.

=== Novels ===
- Kap Farväl (Cape Farewell) 1933
- Nässlorna blomma (Flowering Nettle) 1935
- Vägen ut (The Way Out) 1936
- Den förlorade jaguaren (The Lost Jaguar) 1941
- Vägen till Klockrike (The Road) 1948

=== Essays ===
- Resor utan mål (Aimless Journeys) 1932
- Svärmare och harkrank 1937
- Midsommardalen (Midsommer valley) 1938
- Det enkla och det svåra (The easy and the hard) 1938
- Verklighet till döds (Reality to death) 1940
- Utsikt från en grästuva (Views From A Tuft of Grass) 1963

=== Poems ===
- Spökskepp 1929
- Nomad 1931. Illustrated edition 1943 with new poems and drawings by Torsten Billman
- Passad (Trade Wind) 1945
- Cikada 1953
- Aniara 1956
- Gräsen i Thule 1958
- Vagnen 1960
- Dikter om ljus och mörker 1971
- Tuvor 1973

=== Radio plays ===
- Gringo
- Salvation 1947
- Lotsen från Moluckas 1948

=== Stage play ===
- Tre knivar från Wei 1964

=== Psalms ===
- De blomster som i marken bor

=== Works in English ===
- Cape Farewell (Kap Farväl!), 1934 – translated by Naomi Walford
- Flowering Nettle (Nässlorna blomma), 1936 – translated by Naomi Walford
- The Road (Vägen till Klockrike), 1955 – translated by M.A. Michael
- Friends, you drank some darkness Three Swedish Poets: Harry Martinson, Gunnar Ekelöf and Tomas Tranströmer, 1975 – translated by Robert Bly
- Aniara, 1976 – translated by Hugh MacDiarmid and Elsepeth Harley Schubert
- Wild Bouquet Nature Poems, 1985 – translated by William Jay Smith and Leif Sjöberg
- Aniara, 1991 – translated by Stephen Klass and Leif Sjöberg
- Views From a Tuft of Grass (Utsikt från en grästuva), 2005 – translated by Lars Nordström and Erland Anderson

Cultural offices
Preceded by Elin Wägner	Swedish Academy; Seat No.15; 1949–78	Succeeded by Kerstin Ekman
