= Anna Greta Wide =

Swedish poet (1920–1965)

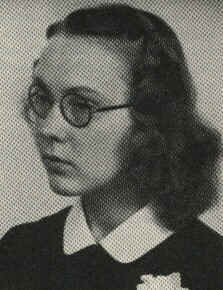
- Wide in 1942
- Born: Anna Greta Wide; 4 December 1920; Gothenburg, Sweden
- Died: 28 August 1965 (aged 44); Gothenburg, Sweden
- Education: University of Gothenburg
- Occupation: Poet

Anna Greta Wide (4 December 1920 – 28 August 1965) was a Swedish poet. One of the greatest Swedish poets of the 1940s, she was known for her style of lyrical poetry, which was distinctive to her contemporaries.

== Early life and education ==
Anna Greta Wide was born on 4 December 1920 in Gothenburg, Sweden. She was the only child of Otto Wide, a teacher, and his wife Annie Kjellmer. She attended the Gothenburg Girls' School, where she undertook the Latin programme and graduated in 1940. After the completion of her secondary education, she was admitted to the University of Gothenburg. She received her Bachelor of Arts degree in 1949, and her Master of Arts degree in Nordic languages, English, literary history, and pedagogy in 1951. She became an assistant instructor in Swedish at the Gothenburg Lower Secondary School, and later at Kungsbacka Coeducational Lower Secondary School.

== Career ==
Wide developed an early interest in writing poetry; she wrote the poem "Aphrodite" while she was at high school, which earned her the national literature prize Eckersteinska litteraturpriset in 1956. She published her first poetry collection Nattmusik in 1942, and followed it with Orgelpunkt that appeared two years later. Both works visited retrospective themes such as the origin of mankind and the meaning of life. Wide's next poetry collection brought her sudden acclaim. Dikter i juli, published in 1955, was heavily inspired by her faith in Christianity. Arranged in the form of a requiem and devoid of rhyme, it shows the use of modern language in a fragmented style. Wide wrote it to reflect the voices of those who survived and those who were abandoned. Her lyrical style of poetry, characterised by rhythmic flow and traditional religious restraint, was strikingly distinctive to her contemporaries. Most of her works have a premise drawn from the feelings of humanity, as well as the landscape of Bohuslän. Examples include her later writings, such as Broar (1956) and Kyrie (1960), and particularly her final work, Den saliga osäkerheten (1964).

== Death ==
Wide discovered that she had cancer in 1963, and died in Gothenburg, on 28 August 1965.
