= Modernist Swedish literature =

The period of Modernistic Swedish literature started in the 1910s. Some regard 1910 itself as the beginning, when August Strindberg published several critical newspaper articles, contesting many conservative values. Several other years are also possible. What is undisputed is that with the advent of social democracy and large labor strikes, the winds of the 1910s blew in the direction of a working class reformation.

After World War I (1914-1919), literature was marked by despair, depicted in works of Pär Lagerkvist, Hjalmar Bergman and Birger Sjöberg. Literature moved in the direction of proletariat writings during the interwar years, and the remainders of folklore had been reduced to virtual insignificance.

Proletarian writing had its strongest period in 1920–1940. Artur Lundkvist and the literary group Fem unga played a key role in introducing literary modernism with an anthology published in 1929. Notable proletarian writers were Moa Martinson (1890-1964), who wrote about the difficulties women had in factory and farm work; and her husband, Harry Martinson (1904-1978), who wrote about the fragility of human beings. But the most distinguished proletarian writer of the time was Ivar Lo-Johansson (1901-1990), writing about the Swedish land-workers in novels, short stories and journalism, and also engaging in public debates about many other topics.

In the late 1930s, the political developments in Germany had their effects on Swedish literature. Taking a stand against National Socialism, Pär Lagerkvist wrote the novels Bödeln (1933) and Dvärgen (The Dwarf) (1944), both investigating human evil. A stand against National Socialism was also made by Karin Boye in the novel Kallocain (1940) set in a future totalitarian world; the novel has since been translated into ten languages. During the war, Eyvind Johnson also took a recognized stand with his The Krilon Group series (1941-1943), a massive work speaking strongly in favour of democratic values, condemning dictatorship and worship of power.

In the mid- to late 1940s, the literary movement fyrtiotalism with writers such as Erik Lindegren, Stig Dagerman and Lars Ahlin definitely established the modernist literature in Sweden.

== Notes and references ==
- Algulin, Ingemar, A History of Swedish Literature, published by the Swedish Institute, 1989. ISBN 91-520-0239-X
- Gustafson, Alrik, Svenska litteraturens historia, 2 volums (Stockholm, 1963). First published as A History of Swedish Literature, (American-Scandinavian Foundation, 1961).
- Lönnroth, L., Delblanc S., Göransson, S. Den svenska litteraturen (ed.), 3 volumes (1999)
- Swedish Institute, Modern Literature, accessed October 17, 2006
- Tigerstedt, E.N., Svensk litteraturhistoria (Tryckindustri AB, Solna, 1971)
