= Swedish realism =

Swedish realism is the period in Swedish literature that encompassed the last two decades of the 19th century. It is generally considered to have ended in the 1910s but the exact year is a matter of debate.

== Novelists ==
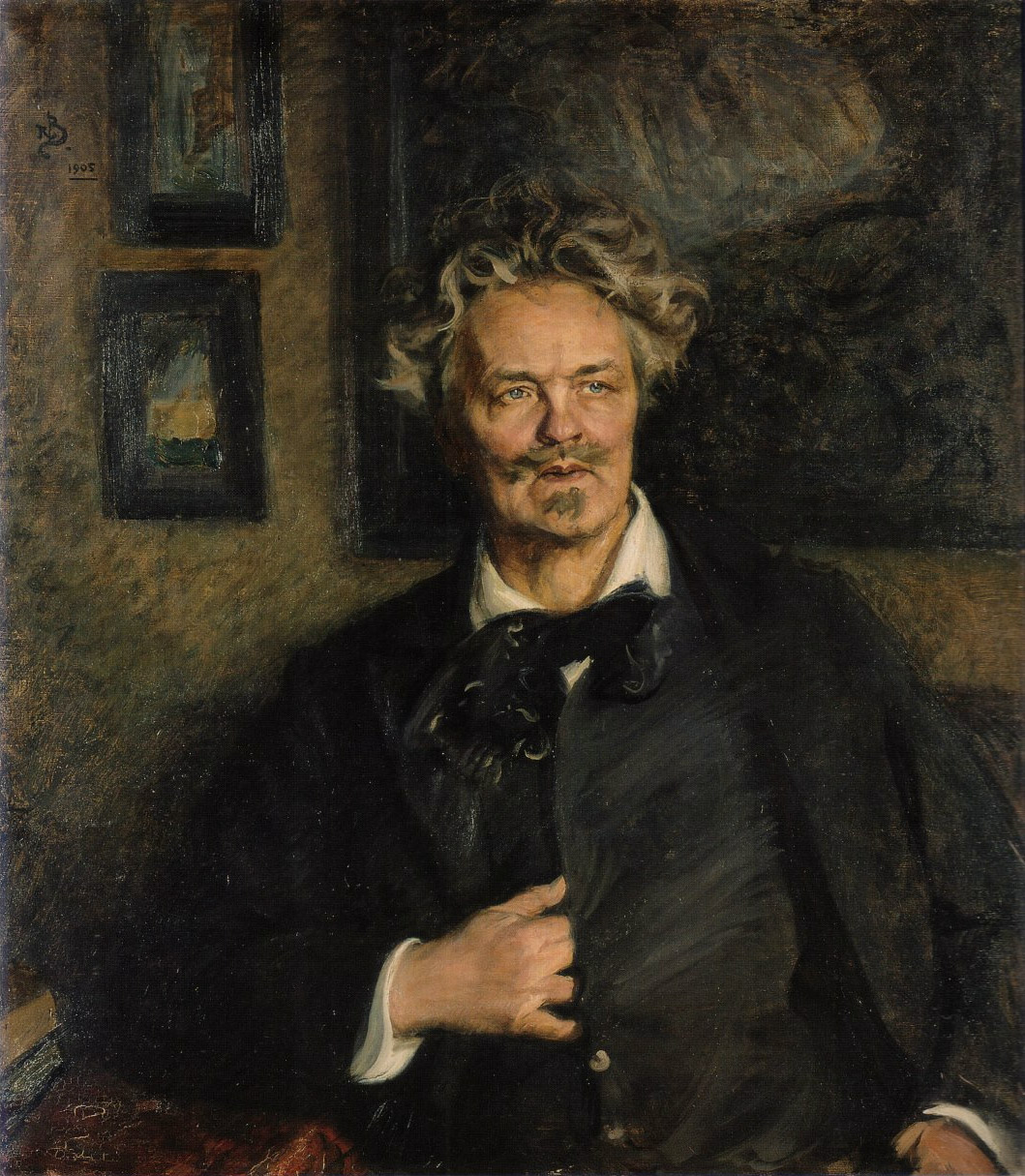
Strindberg, painted by Richard Bergh, 1906

=== August Strindberg ===
August Strindberg (1849–1912) was a writer world-famous for his dramas and prose, noted for his exceptional talent and complex intellect. In 1879 he published The Red Room (Röda Rummet), which brought him immediate fame. The Red Room was a satirical novel that relentlessly attacked the political, the academic, the philosophical and the religious worlds.

After several harsh disputes, Strindberg left Sweden in 1883. In 1884, he briefly returned to Stockholm to stand trial in a blasphemy case against his collection of short stories Married (Giftas). He was acquitted, but the trial sparked a psychological turmoil that lasted for some 10 years, during which he wrote some of his internationally best known works: the self-examinatory Tjänstekvinnans son (1886–87), En dåres försvarstal (1887–87); and also plays Fadren, Fröken Julie and Mäster Olof (1886–88).

In 1897 Strindberg engaged himself in occultism, in particular alchemy, leading to a mental breakdown known as his Inferno-crisis. The following year (1897), Strindberg moved back to Sweden and settled in the city Lund. There, he resurrected his literary production by publishing Inferno.

In 1898, Strindberg moved back to Stockholm. He continued writing but also engaged himself energetically in debates in a wide range of subjects. His most notable writings during this period were his dramas, such as The Dance of Death (1900) and A Dream Play (1901).

=== Victoria Benedictsson ===
Victoria Benedictsson is regarded as one of the greatest writers of the Swedish realist style, with her most notable works including Pengar ("Money")(1885) and Fru Marianne ("Mrs. Marianne")(1887). In her novels she described the inequality of marriage and often debated women's rights issues in her writings. Current critics see her as an early feminist; earlier the focus was on her love affair with Danish literature critic Georg Brandes. She also wrote plays, one of which, entitled I Telefon (Swedish: On Telephone), was highly successful, being performed 27 times at the Royal Dramatic Theatre in Stockholm. The play was serialized in Familie Journalen in 1887.

== The 90s poets ==
The Swedish 1890s is noted for its poetic neo-romanticism, a reaction to the socio-realistic literature of the 1880s. The first literary key figure to emerge was Verner von Heidenstam (1859–1940), and his literary debut in 1887 with the collection of poetry Vallfart och vandringsår (Pilgrimage and Wander-Years).

Selma Lagerlöf (1858–1940) was the arguably brightest star of the 1890s, and her impression has lasted up to modern times. She wrote several highly regarded works which are still among the toplists on Swedish libraries, such as Gösta Berlings saga (1891), an epic tale of the unmoral Gösta Berling who gets haunted by the Devil, and The Wonderful Adventures of Nils (1906–1907), a geographical adventure of Nils who travels Sweden on the back of a goose. Lagerlöf was awarded the Nobel Prize in Literature in 1909 for the imagination and spiritual perception that characterized her writings.

Gustaf Fröding (1860–1911) was another key figure of the 1890s. His active literary period only spanned between 1891 and 1898, because of mental problems. Fröding was above all renowned for his flowing poetry. His popularity was at first based on his bubbling sense of humor and free treatment of the poetic verse; but later readers also found in it a profound humanism and imaginative depth.

Erik Axel Karlfeldt (1864–1931) was, like Fröding, a depictor of rural life in his native province (in Karlfeldt's case, Dalarna). His poetry had the intention of sparking a cultural identity within Dalarna, and spoke warmly of traditions, family values, and so on. Although his poetry was narrow, Karlfeldt was awarded the Nobel Prize in Literature in 1931 (posthumously), possibly as a result of internal politics within the Swedish Academy.

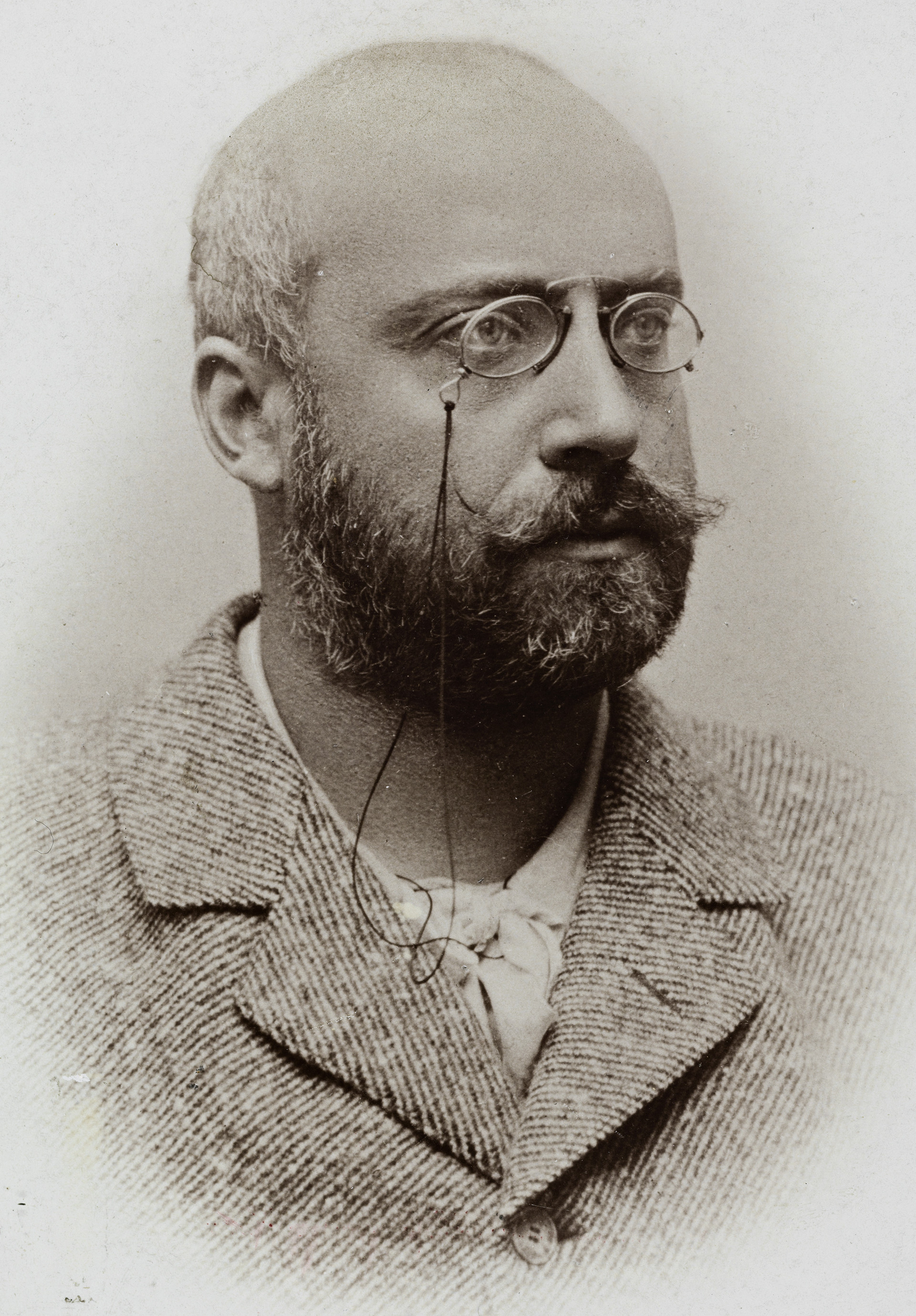
Fröding, 1896

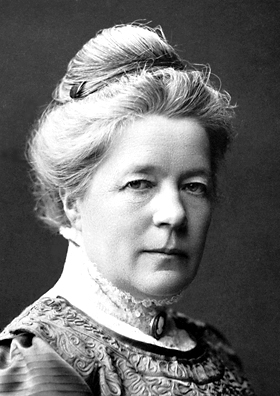
Lagerlöf, 1909
