= Then Swänska Argus =

Defunct Swedish literary periodical (1732–1734)

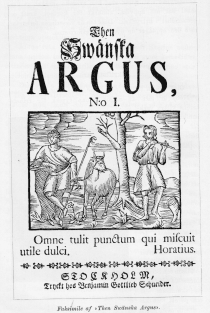
Den Svenska Argus December 13, 1732

Then Swänska Argus (modern Swedish: Den Svenska Argus, IPA: [dɛn ˈsvɛ̂nːska ˈârːɡɵs], "The Swedish Argus") was an 18th-century periodical written entirely by Olof von Dalin, an influential Swedish poet.

It was published weekly from 1732 to 1734 and contained short stories, poems, plays and editorials, totalling between 6 and 10 printed pages. Its first issue, published on December 13, 1732, is commonly considered to be the dividing line between Older New Swedish and Younger New Swedish (äldre nysvenska and yngre nysvenska). Dalin wrote the periodical in a free and lively conversational tone that contrasted with other influential Swedish writers of the time, such as Carl Gyllenborg. The publication also had an important influence on the development of Swedish orthography. Dalin was only 25 at the time of publication, and had yet to travel abroad.

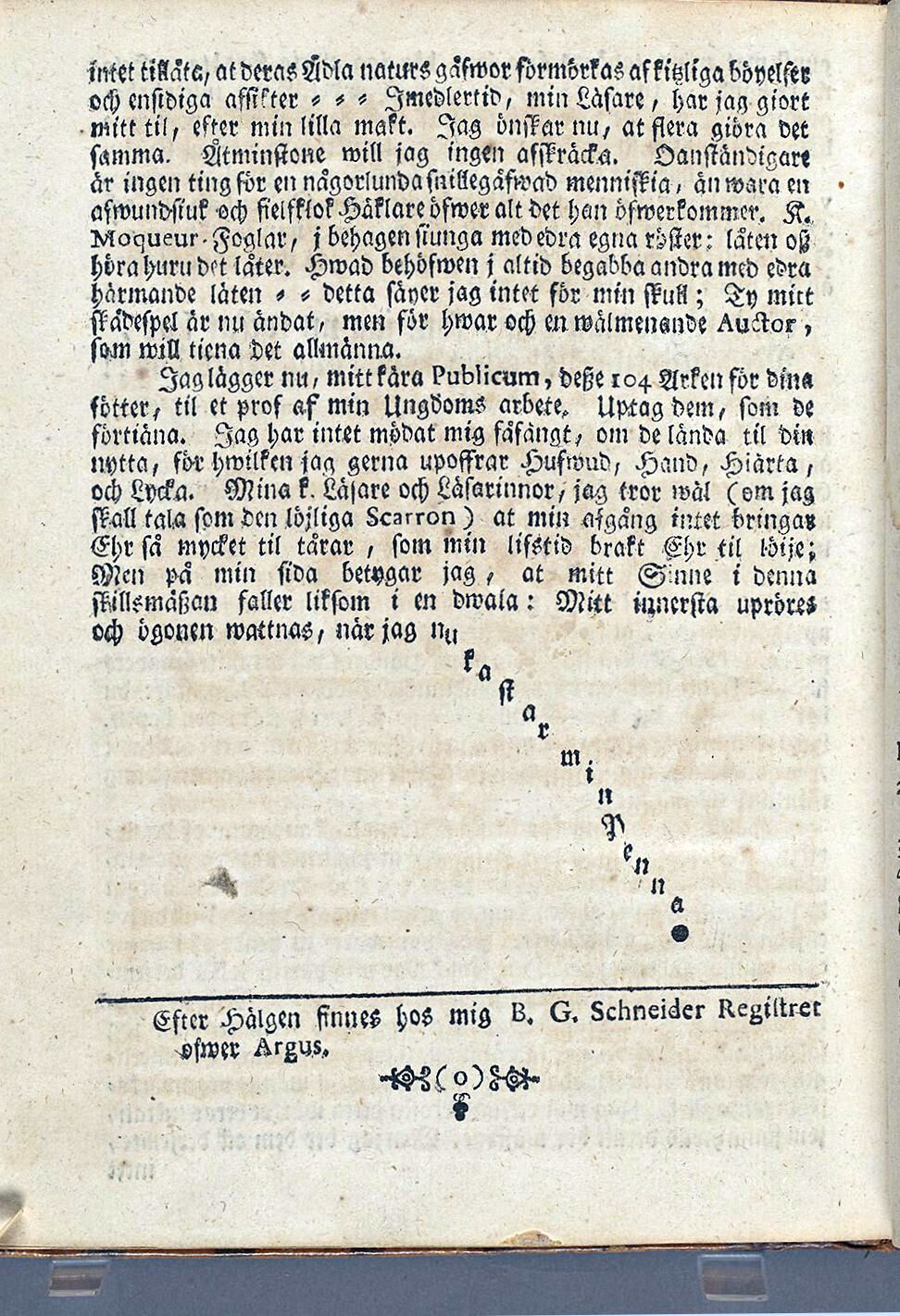
Very last page of Then Swänska Argus in 1734.

Then Swänska Argus fit into a wider literary trend in Europe, represented by light and lively English periodicals such as The Tatler and The Spectator. The only direct Swedish predecessor of Den Svenska Argus was the more formal and less successful Sedolärande Mercurius. Dalin was a keen student of language, combining linguistic influences from his childhood in the southern Swedish province of Halland, his school years at the Lund University and his later employment at the Royal Court of Sweden. Den Svenska Argus proved to be so popular that it was reprinted in its entirety in 1754. Its popularity also propelled Dalin's career, as he rose from royal librarian in 1737, through the noble ranks, to privy councillor in 1753.
