= Flowering Nettle =

1935 novel by Harry Martinson

- Author: Harry Martinson
- Original title: Nässlorna blomma
- Translator: Naomi Walford
- Language: Swedish
- Set in: California, United States; Sweden
- Published: 1935
- Publication place: Sweden
- English publication date: 1936

Flowering Nettle (Swedish: Nässlorna blomma) is a semi-autobiographical novel by the Swedish Nobel laureate Harry Martinson published in 1935 and first translated into English by Naomi Walford in 1936. The English translation altered the titles' plural form of "Nässlorna" to singular form, a correct translation of the title would be "Nettles flowering".

The book tells the story of the orphan child Martin, who is Harry Martinson's alter ego, and is written from the perspective of the child. Martin's father dies, and his mother leaves her children for a new life in California. Everything he holds dear disappears at a very early age, and he grows up working at several farms and being sent away, or going away himself, as he faces the harsh working life of the farmhand. Martin is described as selfish, stupid, childish, self-pitying, obsequious, cowardly and false. Thus, there is no idealisation of the child.

The language in the novel has been described as intentionally childlike.

Flowering Nettle and its continuation The way out are partly autobiographical and depict the hard and insecure existence of an orphan child among the destitute in Sweden at the beginning of the 20th century.
