= Fem unga =

Swedish anthology of modernist literature

5 unga
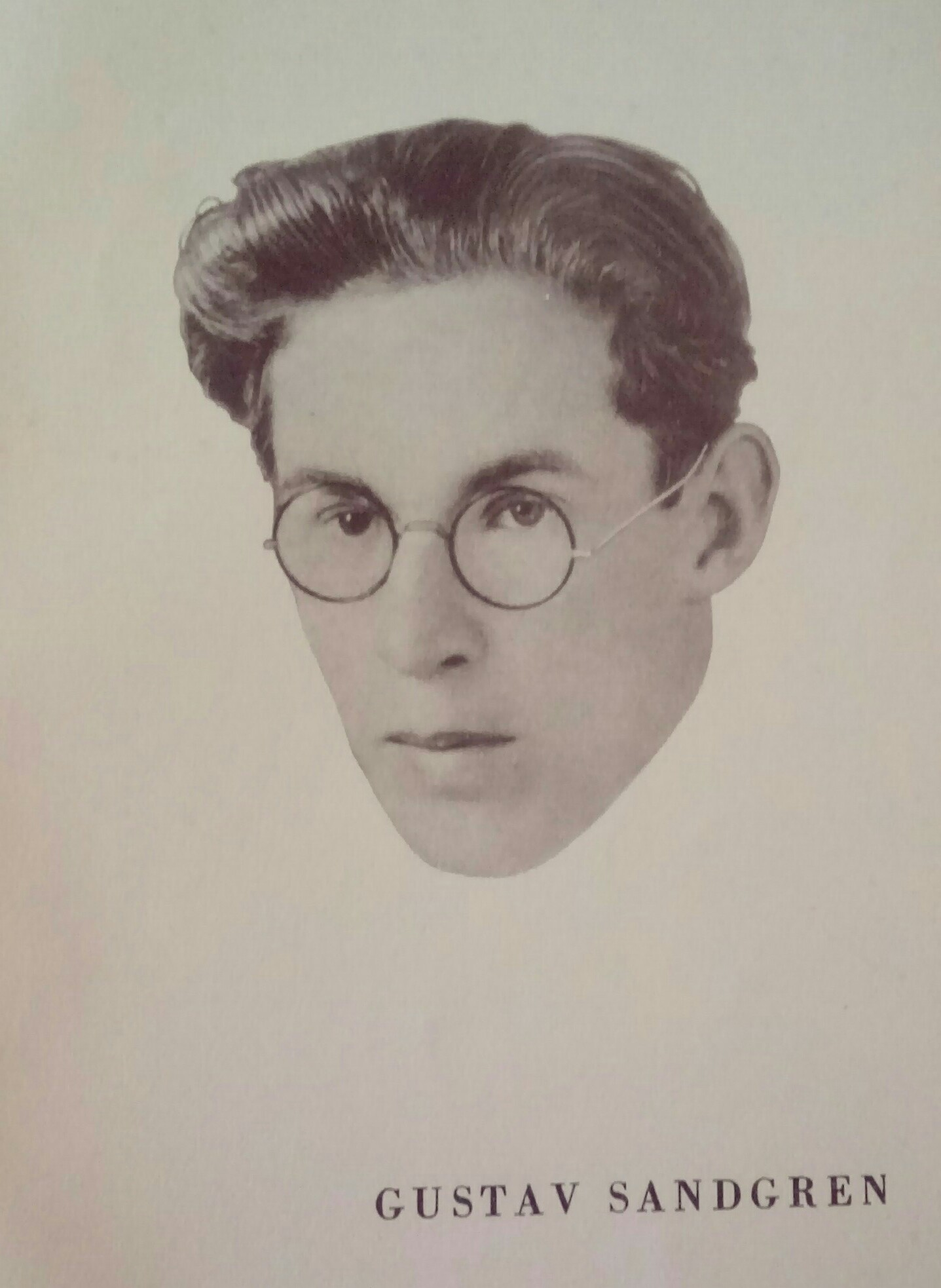
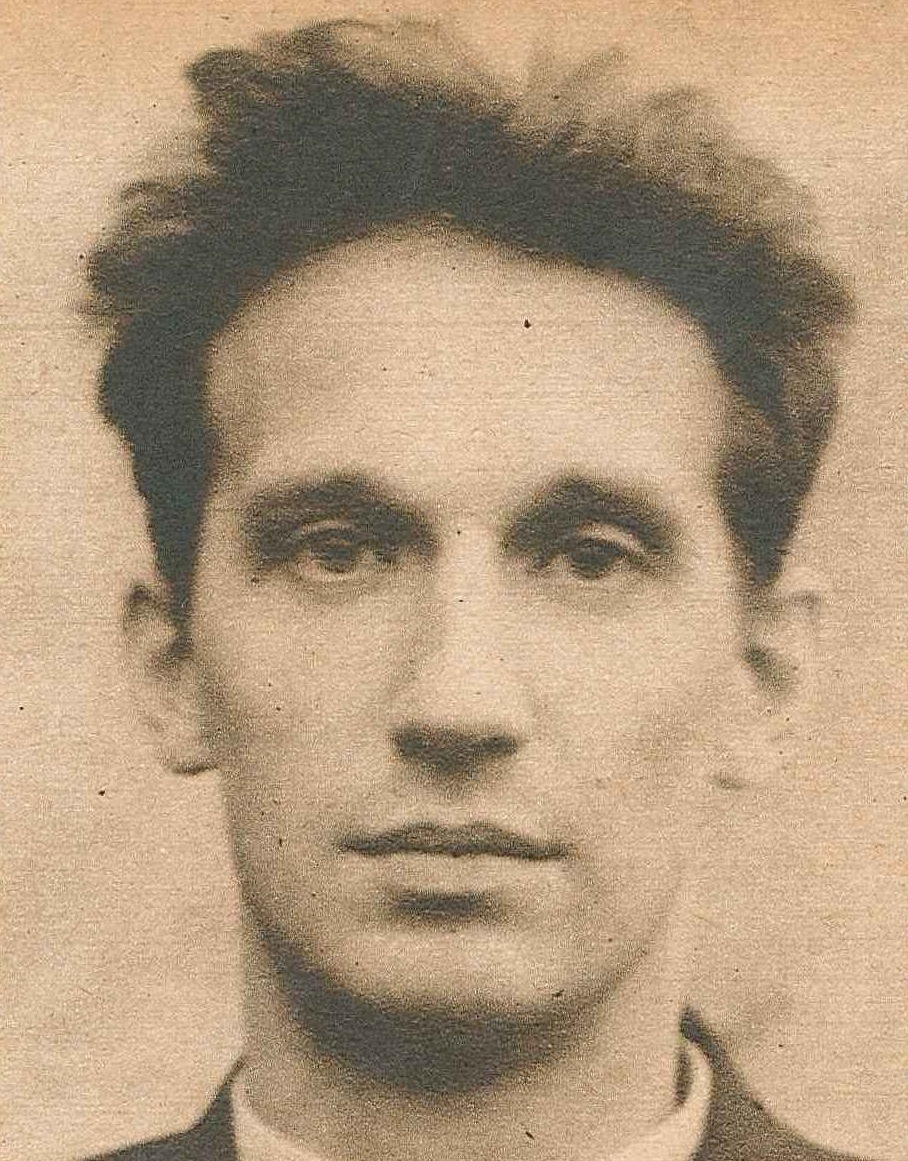
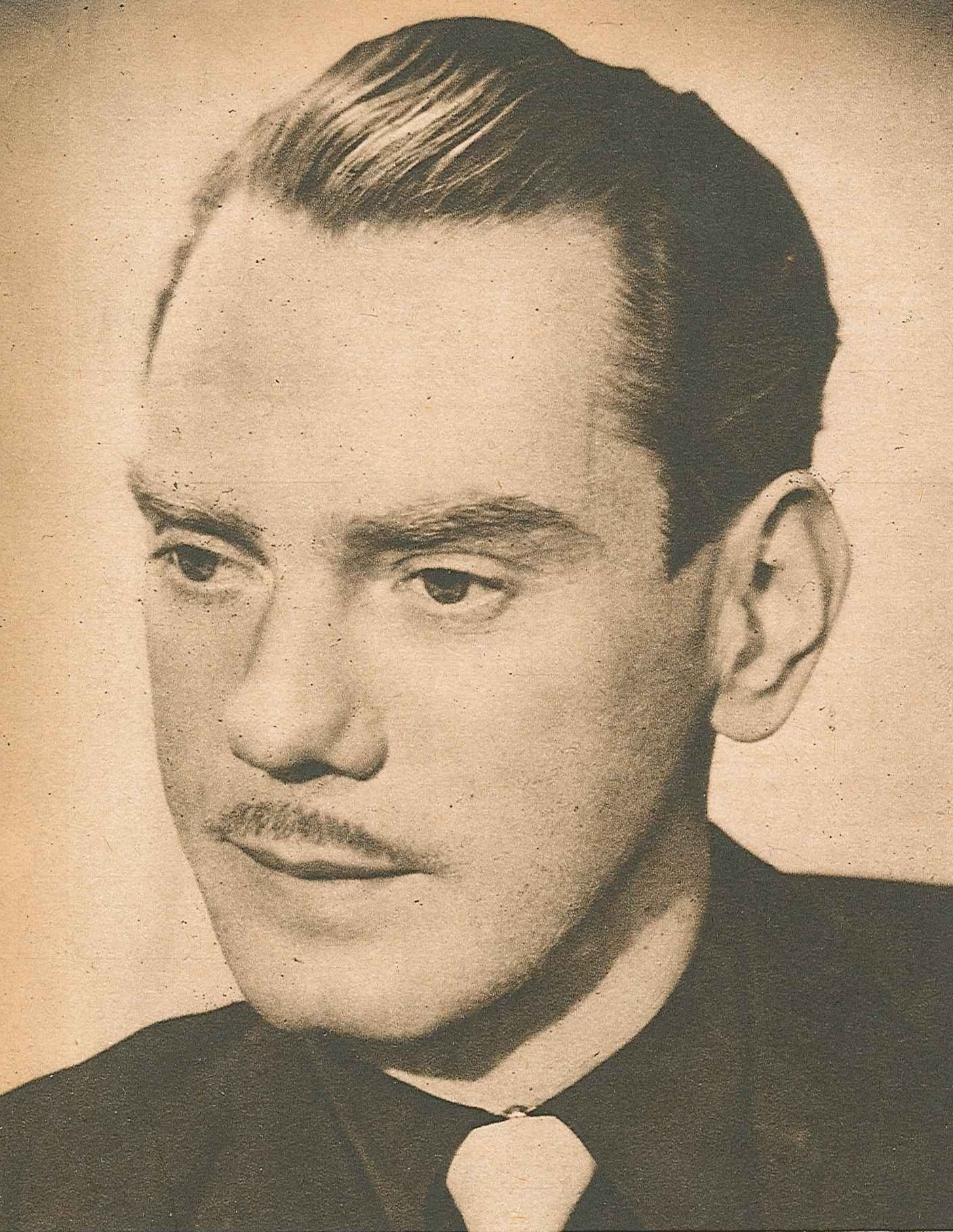
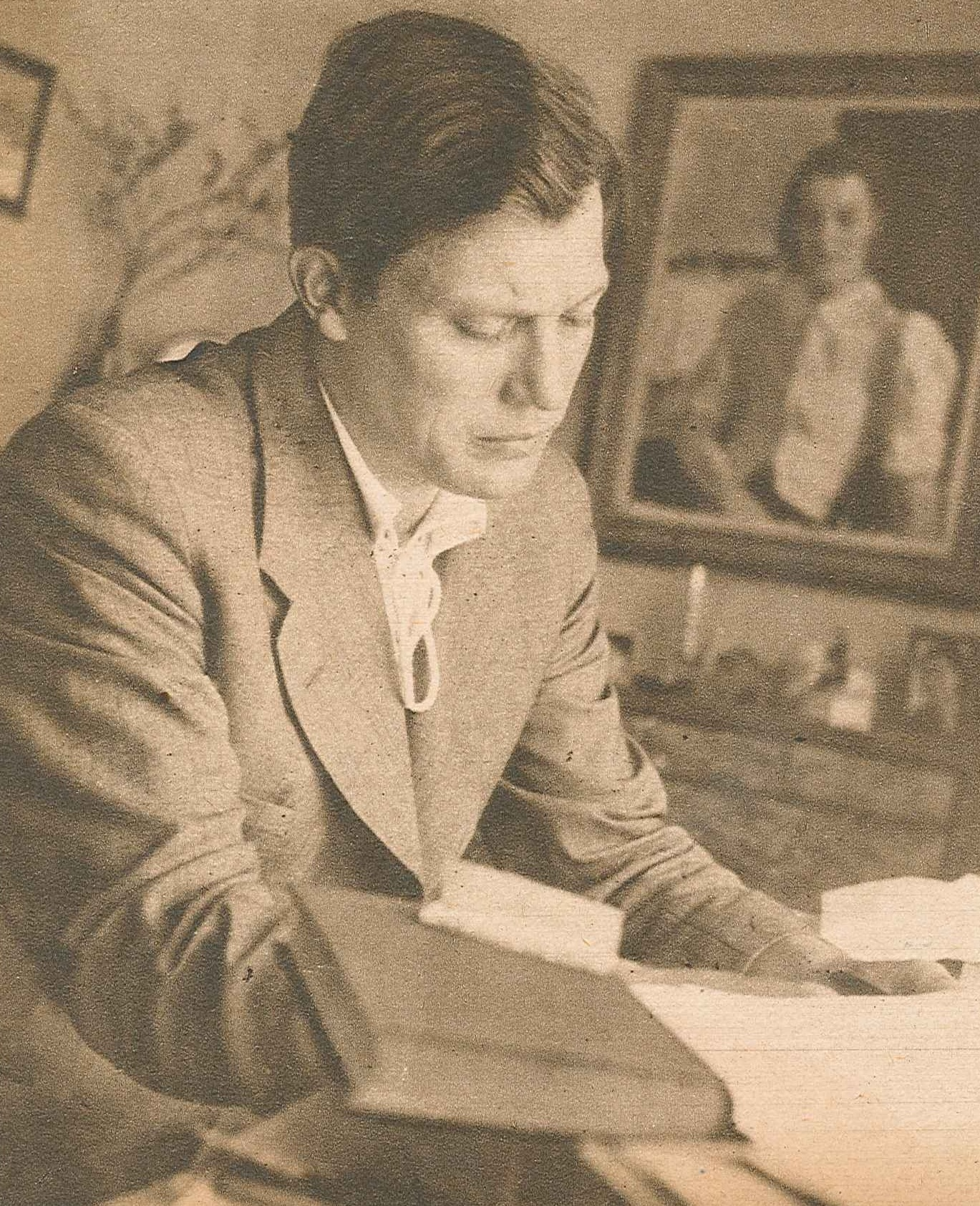
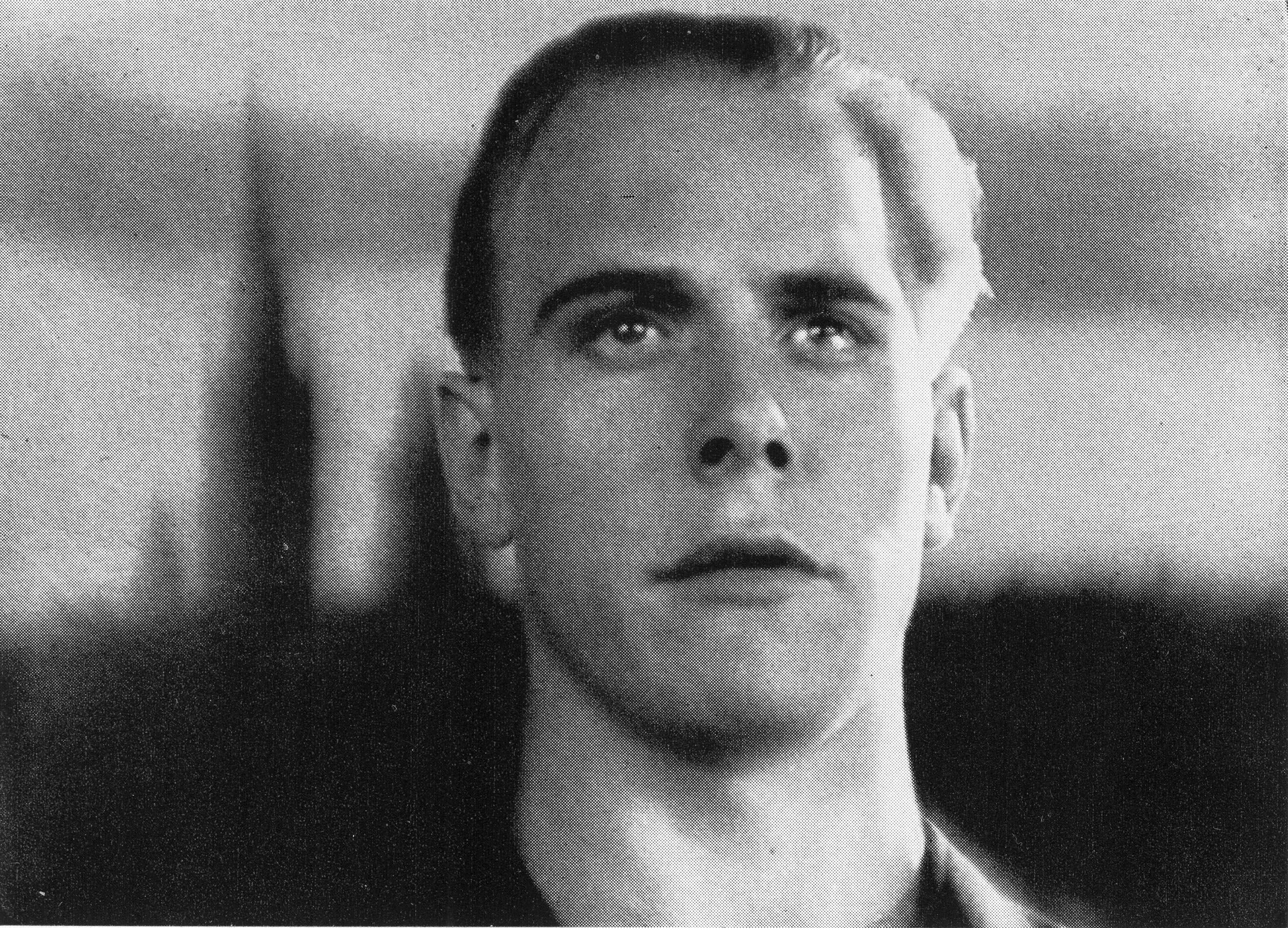
- Top row: Gustav Sandgren, Josef Kjellgren, Artur Lundkvist. Bottom row: Harry Martinson and Erik Asklund.
- Authors: Erik Asklund; Josef Kjellgren; Artur Lundkvist; Harry Martinson; Gustav Sandgren
- Language: Swedish
- Published: 1929
- Publisher: Bonniers
- Publication place: Sweden

Fem unga or 5 unga ("Five Young People" or "Five Young Men") is a Swedish anthology published in 1929 and the name of the literary group formed by the five young proletarian writers who contributed to it: Erik Asklund, Josef Kjellgren, Artur Lundkvist, Harry Martinson and Gustav Sandgren. Fem unga played a key role in introducing literary modernism in Swedish literature.

== Background ==
Asklund and Kjellgren were childhood friends who grew up together in the Södermalm district of Stockholm. Lundkvist, who moved to Stockholm in 1926, became acquainted with them and later described Asklund as his closest friend at the time. Together, they formed the core of the group and began to make plans for a joint appearance in an anthology of young writers with a modernist orientation.

Fem unga were not originally a unified group; they came from different backgrounds and did not all even know each other when they were brought together in the anthology by Lundkvist in 1929. He had met Martinson in 1927. Lundkvist started writing to Sandgren after noticing his contributions in the political youth magazine Stormklockan. Soon, Asklund and Kjellgren were also in correspondence with Sandgren. In 1928, a first version of the anthology, then called Sex unga (Six Young People), was sent to the publisher but was rejected. The sixth author in the circle was Olle Wedholm. However, he was excluded after Sex unga was rejected and the publisher had particularly strong reservations about Wedholm's contribution.

== Style ==
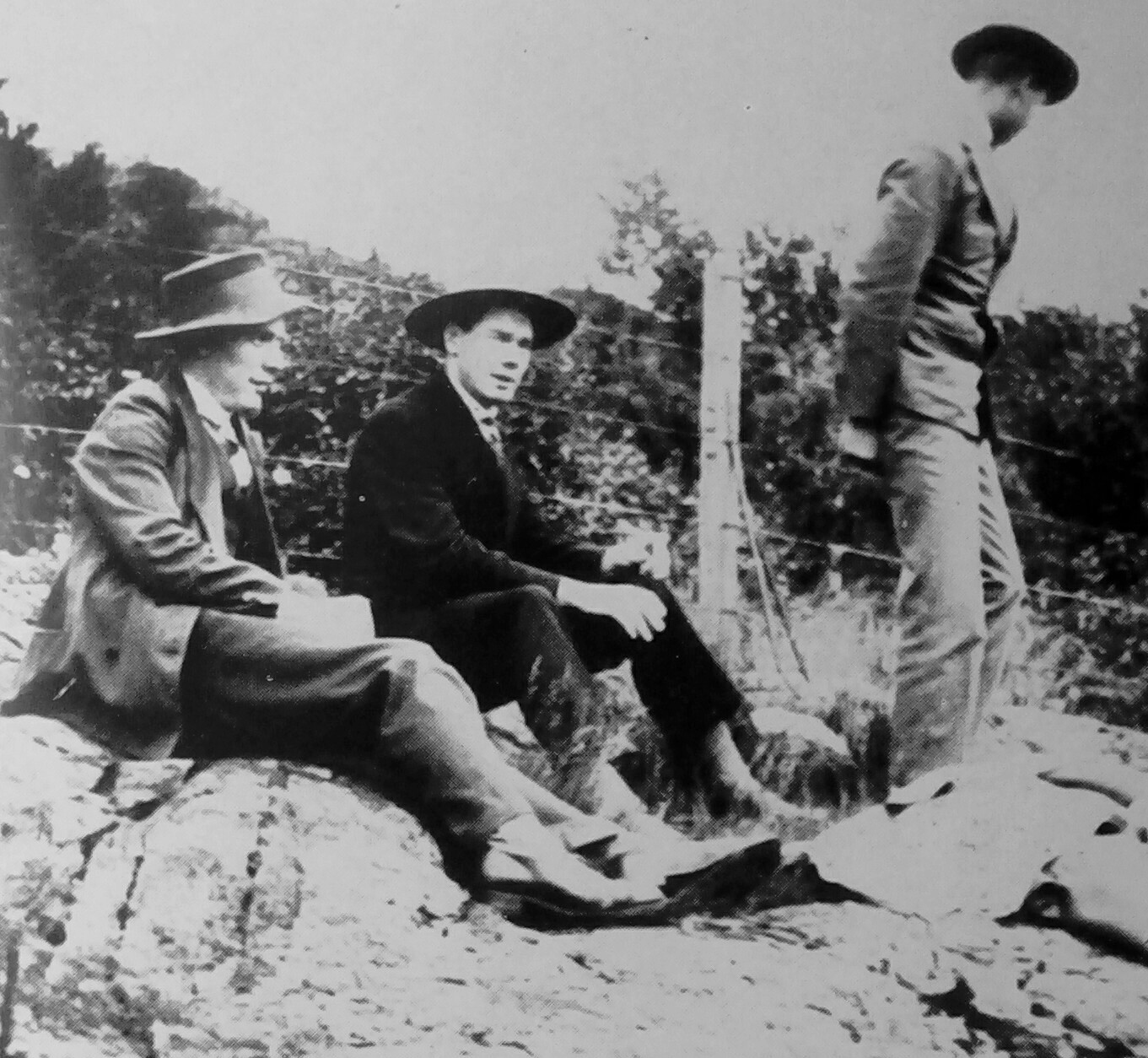
Erik Asklund, Artur Lundkvist and Josef Kjellgren

The anthology challenged prevailing literary conventions with its free verse forms, and the authors' advocacy of primitivism and "worship of life" in all its aspects caused a sensation. The young authors were influenced by poets such as Walt Whitman, Carl Sandburg, Langston Hughes, and Elmer Diktonius, and drew inspiration from futurism. With strong optimism for the future, they wrote about machines and physical labor, modern city life, jazz, and eroticism, which was something completely new in Swedish literature. Some critics dismissed them as "asphalt poets" and "sexual romantics."

With Lundkvist as the initiator and driving force behind the group and Asklund as the organizer, the authors appeared for a time as a group in various literary contexts, including radio readings. However, the group only remained together for a few years, as the authors soon went their separate ways.

It was mainly Lundkvist, Kjellgren, and Asklund who embraced the literary ideology, while Martinson and Sandgren were more independent from the outset and took a wait-and-see approach to parts of it. Gustav Sandgren, who with his romantic prose pieces in the anthology appeared to be perhaps the most divergent of the five, ultimately became the only one who remained committed to primitivism and the worship of life for a long time.

== Publication and influence ==
Fem unga was published in the fall of 1929 and was met with condescension by critics. Later, however, Fem unga was recognised as an important milestone in Swedish literary studies, as it paved the way for the breakthrough of working-class literature in the 1930s with names such as Vilhelm Moberg, Moa Martinson, Ivar Lo-Johansson, Jan Fridegård, Folke Fridell and others, as well as modernist poets such as Erik Lindegren.

In 1931, members of the circle around Fem unga made the short film Gamla stan, a depiction of Stockholm's Gamla Stan, which stands out for its oblique angles and montage technique.
