= Olof von Dalin =

Swedish nobleman, poet, historian and courtier (1708–1763)

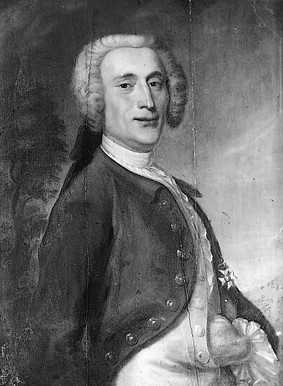
Portrait by Johan Joachim Streng, 1732

Olof von Dalin (29 August 1708 – 12 August 1763) was a Swedish nobleman, poet, historian and courtier. He was an influential literary figure of the Swedish Enlightenment.

== Background ==
Olof Dalin was born in the parish of Vinberg in Halland. His father was the parish minister. His birth name prior to knighthood was Dahlin. Olof Dalin's father had taken his name from his hometown, Dalstorp in the County of Älvsborg. He was closely related to Andreas Rydelius (1671–1738), Bishop of Lund, and he was sent at a very early age to be instructed by him. Carl Linnaeus was one of his fellow-pupils.

== Career ==
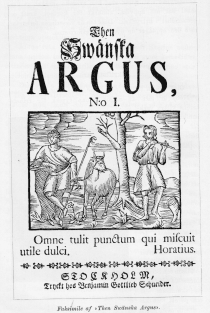
Den Svenska Argus 13 December 1732

In 1723, while studying at Lund University, he first accompanying his stepfather, Severin Böckman, to Stockholm and in 1726 he entered into public office there. Under the patronage of Baron Claes Rålamb (1682–1751) he rapidly rose to favor, and his skill and intelligence won him a golden reputation. In the 1730s, Dalin wrote plays for the theatre, inspired by French dramas and much admired by his contemporaries. In 1733 he started the weekly Svenska Argus, on the model of Joseph Addison's The Spectator, writing anonymously until 1736. Svenska Argus was a champion of the Enlightenment and aimed to raise the level of culture in Sweden . His next work was Tankar öfver Critiquer (1736).

He became Royal Librarian (1737–39) and was later appointed Rikshistoriograf (National Historiographer) (1755–56). With the avowed purpose of enlarging the horizons of his cultivation and tastes, Dalin set off, in the company of his pupil, Baron Rålamb's son, on a tour through Germany and France, in 1739-1740. Upon his return, the shifting political life at home caused him to write his famous satirical allegories, Sagan om Hästen and Aprilverk (1738), that were very popular and inspired countless imitations.

During the early part of his life, he was universally admitted to be facile princeps among the Swedish poets of his time. His dramas were also of interest, particularly his comedy of Den afvundsjuke (1738). He also wrote a tragedy, Brynilda (1759), and a pastoral in three scenes upon King Adolphus Frederick's return from Finland.

His didactic epos of Svenska Friheten appeared in 1742. Hitherto, Addison and Alexander Pope had been his models. In this work he draws his inspiration from Thomson, whose poem, Liberty, he emulated. In 1742, he was made a member of the Royal Swedish Academy of Sciences. Dalin started publishing his Swedish history, Svea Rikes Historia in 1747. He would die before this work was complete.

On the accession of King Adolphus Frederick of Sweden in 1751, Dalin received the post of Tutor to the crown prince – afterwards Gustavus III. He had enjoyed the confidence of Queen Louisa Ulrika, sister of Frederick the Great of Prussia, while she was crown princess, and she now made him secretary of the Swedish Academy of Letters, founded by her in 1753.

His position at court involved him in the queen's political intrigues, and separated him to a vexatious degree from the studies wherein he had hitherto been absorbed. He held the post of Tutor to the crown prince until 1756, when he was arrested on suspicion of taking part in the attempted coup d'état that year, and was tried for his life before the diet. He was acquitted, but was forbidden to show himself at court on any pretense. This period of exile, lasting until 1761, Dalin spent in the preparation of the third volume of his great historical work, the Svea Rikes historia, that related events up to the death of King Charles IX of Sweden in 1611. The first two volumes appeared in 1746-1750; the third, in two parts, in 1760-1762.

Dalin had been made a noble in 1751, and made privy councillor in 1753. In 1761, he once more took his place at court. During his exile, however, his spirit and his health had been broken. In a fit of panic, he had destroyed some manuscripts of his best unpublished works, and this he constantly brooded over. In 1763, he died at his house in Drottningholm.

== Posthumous works ==
In the year 1767, his writings in belles lettres were issued in six volumes, edited by his half brother, J. C. Bökman. Amid an enormous mass of occasional verses, anagrams, epigrams, impromptus and the like, his satires and serious poems were almost buried. But some of these former, even, are found to be songs of remarkable grace and delicacy, and many display a love of natural scenery, and a knowledge of its forms.

== Selected works ==
- Brynilda (1738)
- Den afwundsiuke (1738)
- Sagan om hästen (1740)
- Swenska friheten (1742)
- Svea rikes historia (Volume 1-4, 1747–1762)
- Witterhets-Arbeten (Volume 1-6, 1767; postumt)

== Olof von Dalin Society ==
The Olof von Dalin Society was founded in 1995 at Dalin's native Vinberg near Falkenberg, Sweden. Its mission is to encourage the study, appreciation and understanding of Olof von Dalin, his works, his life and his times.

== Other sources ==
- Carlsson, Ingemar Olof von Dalin - Samhällsdebattör, Historiker, Språkförnyare (CAL-förlaget. Falkenberg 1997)
- Carlsson, Ingemar Olof von Dalin som tecknare (Förlag Utsikten, Falkenberg 2003)
- Warburg, Karl Johan, Olof Dalin: Hans life och gerning: Litterturhistorisk Avhandling (Stockholm : Norstedt, 1884)
- Wikander, Ruth Studier över stil och språk i Dalins Argus (Uppsala : Appelberg, 1924)
