= Josef Kjellgren =

Swedish writer

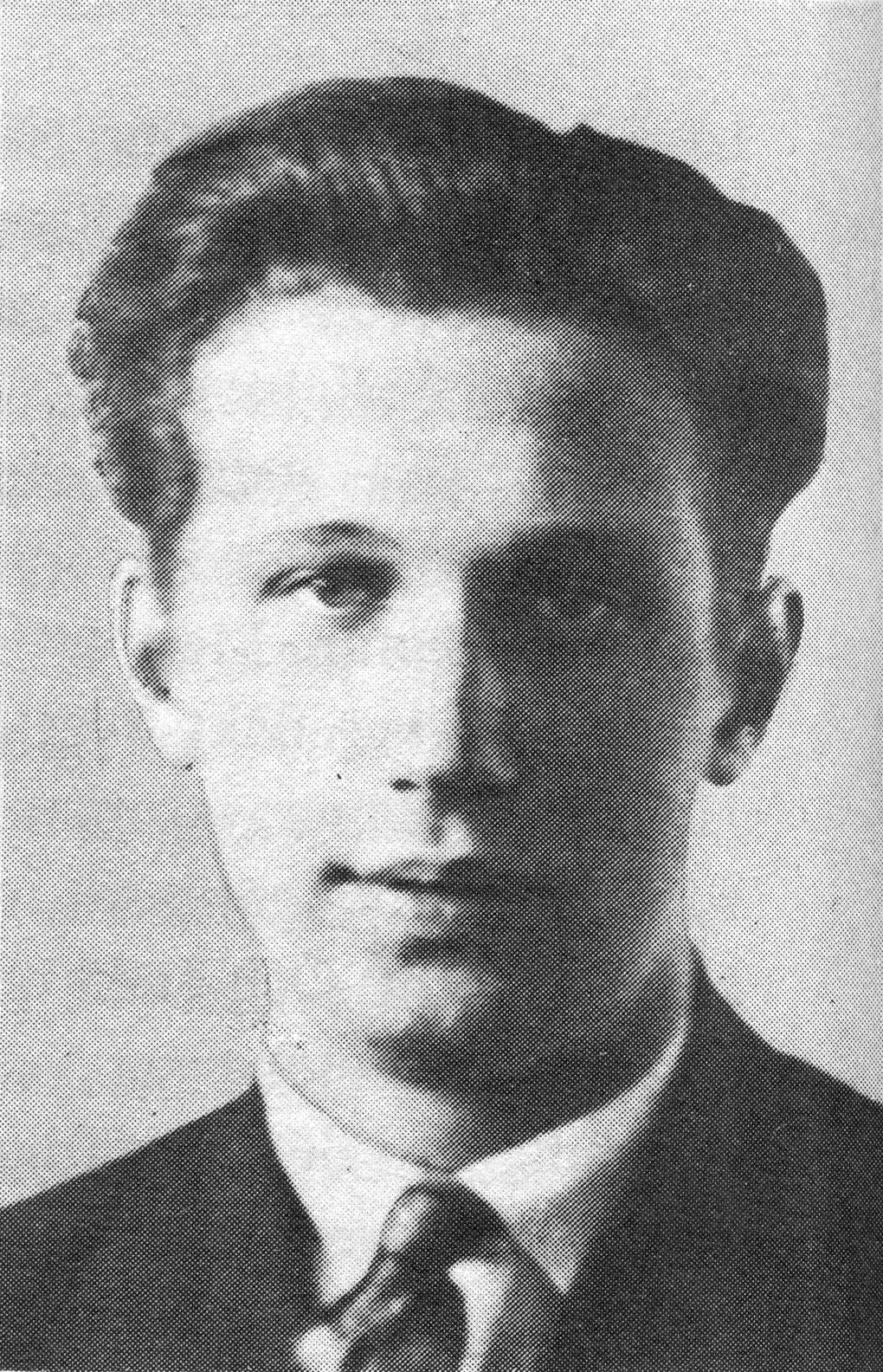
- Born: 13 November 1907; Mörkö, Sweden
- Died: 8 April 1948 (aged 40); Stockholm, Sweden
- Occupations: Writer, playwright
- Writing career
- Period: 1929–48
- Literary movement: Modernism

Josef Kjellgren (13 November 1907 – 8 April 1948) was a Swedish writer and playwright.

== Biography ==
Kjellgren was born and grew up on the island of Mörkö south of Södertälje. Later, his family moved to a residence near Hornstull on Södermalm in Stockholm.

Kjellgren was a proletarian writer and a member of the influential modernist literary group Fem unga (Five young ones) who published an anthology of the same name in 1929. Kjellgren's main theme was proletarian internationalism and solidarity within the working class. He published modernist proletarian poetry and books about his travels in Europe in the early 1930s, such as På snålskjuts genom Europa (Across Europe without a penny in my pocket; 1930). He was a journalist and editor of the magazine Kulturfront from 1942 to 1944.

Kjellgren is best known for his later novels, including Människor kring en bro (People around a bridge; 1935), about the building of Västerbron in Stockholm, and Smaragden (The emerald; 1939). Kjellgren also wrote a play, Okänd svensk soldat (Unknown Swedish soldier; 1938), which was the basis for the 1948 movie Foreign Harbour (Främmande hamn), directed by Hampe Faustman.

Kjellgren died of tuberculosis in 1948 and was buried at Högalids kolumbarium in Stockholm.
