= Erik Asklund =

Swedish writer

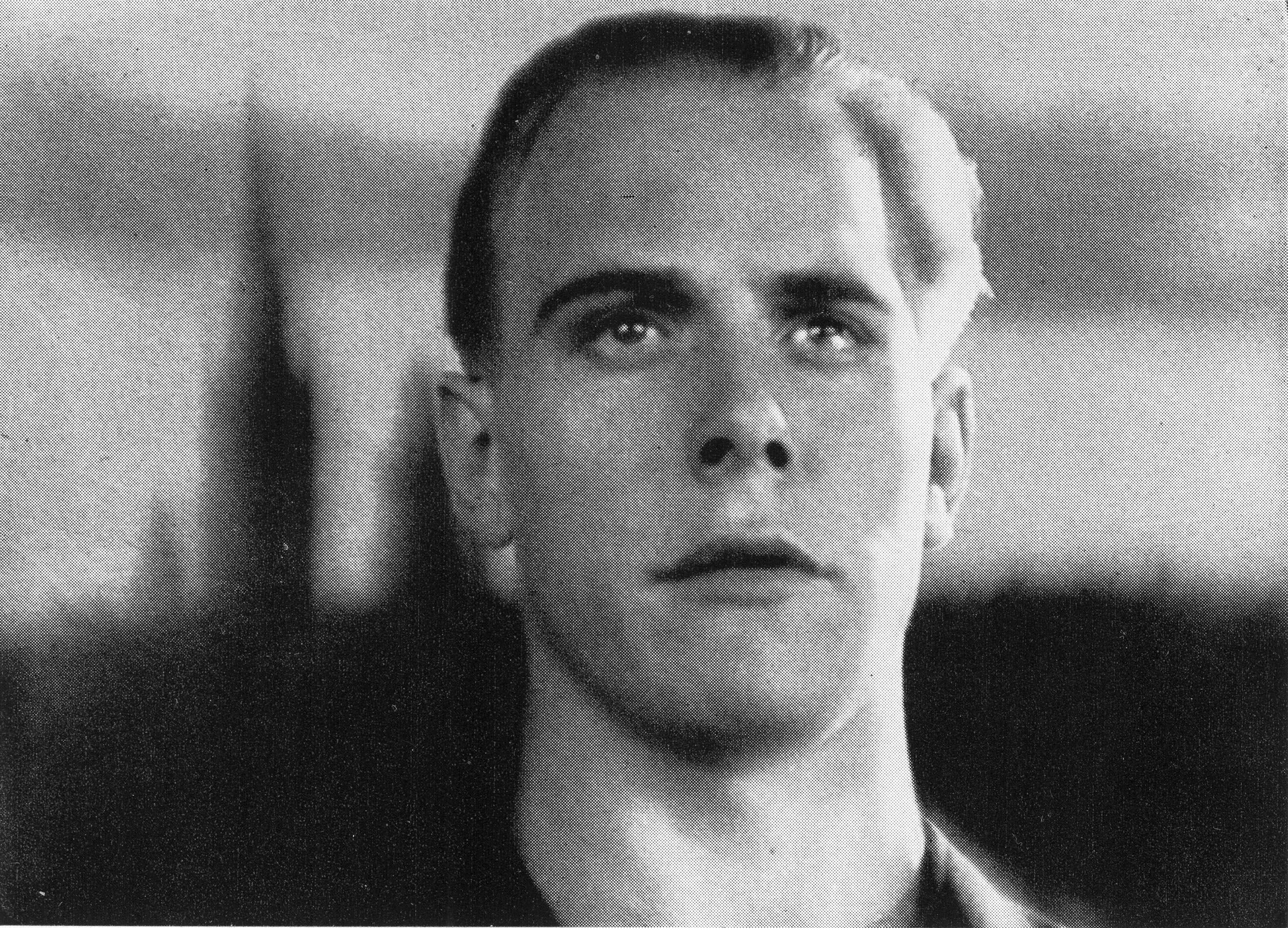
Erik Asklund 1931.

Erik Asklund, born 20 June 1908 in Södermalm, Stockholm, died 6 November 1980 in Stockholm, was a Swedish writer.

Asklund grew up in the working class area Södermalm in Stockholm. He was a proletarian writer and published his first novel Bara en början ("Just a beginning") in 1929. The same year he contributed to the influential modernist anthology Fem Unga ("Five Young Ones"). Most of his books - novels, stories and non-fiction - are set in his native Stockholm. Asklund is best known for Manne, a series of autobiographical novels published in the 1950s.
