= August Atterström =

Swedish architect (1865–1930)

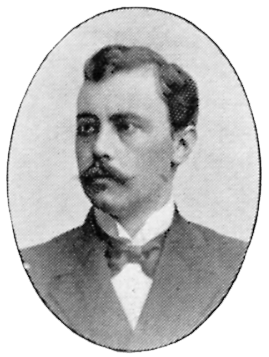
- August Atterström in 1901
- Born: 2 May 1865; Ransäter, Sweden
- Died: 16 April 1930 (aged 64); Jönköping, Sweden
- Education: KTH Royal Institute of Technology; Royal Swedish Academy of Fine Arts
- Occupation: Architect
- Buildings: Per Brahe Secondary School; Grand Hotel, Jönköping; Torpa school, Jönköping; Kruckenbergska house

August Atterström was a Swedish architect. He studied at KTH Royal Institute of Technology (1886–1890) as well as Royal Swedish Academy of Fine Arts (1891–1894) and did multiple study trips to Germany, Austria, Switzerland and Italy.

August was employed by Riksbyggnadskontoret (National Building Agency) when it designed Riksdagshuset. He worked at various private practices before becoming Jönköping's city architect from 1901 to his death in 1930.

== Notable works ==
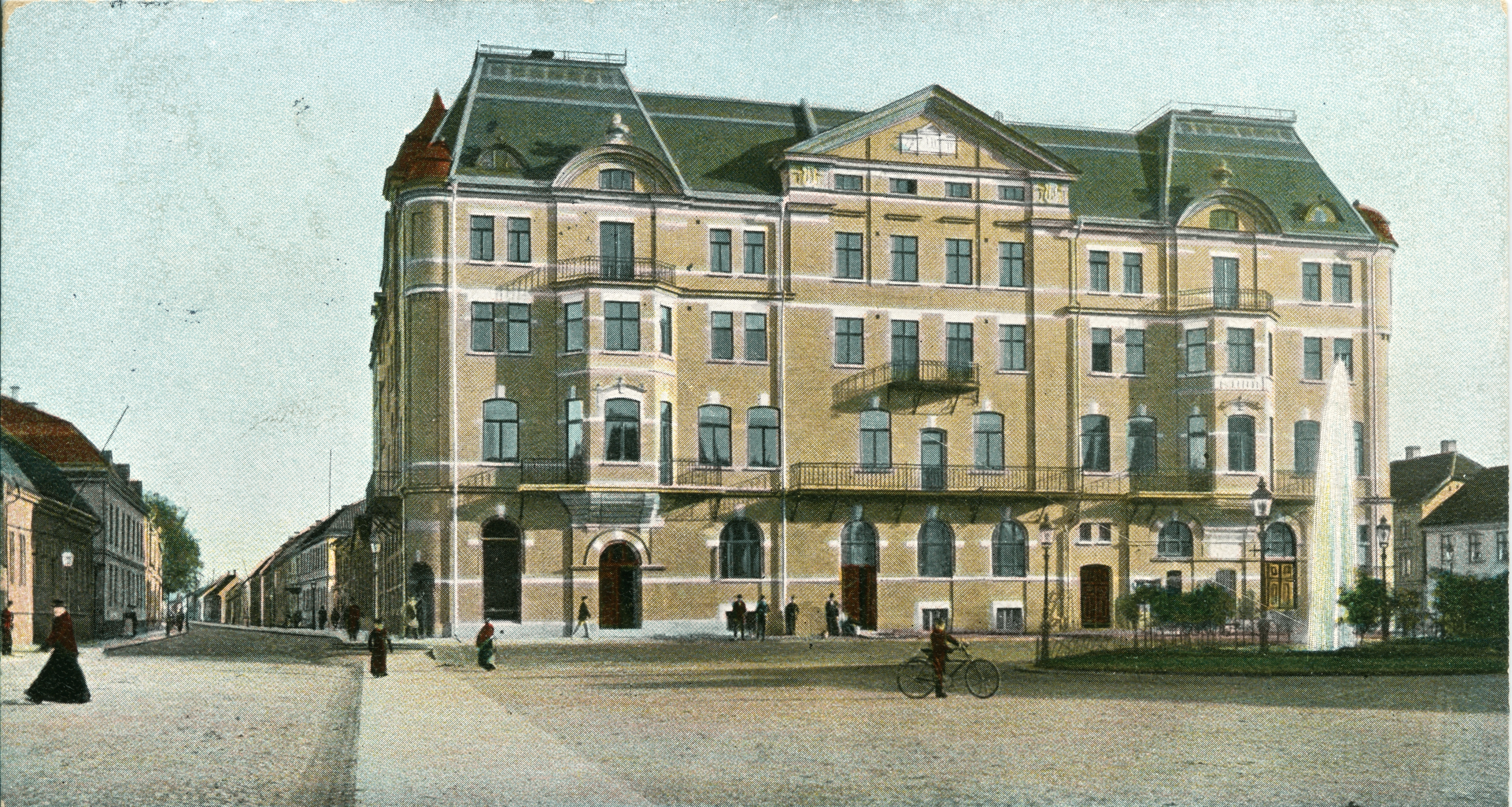
Grand Hotel Jönköping

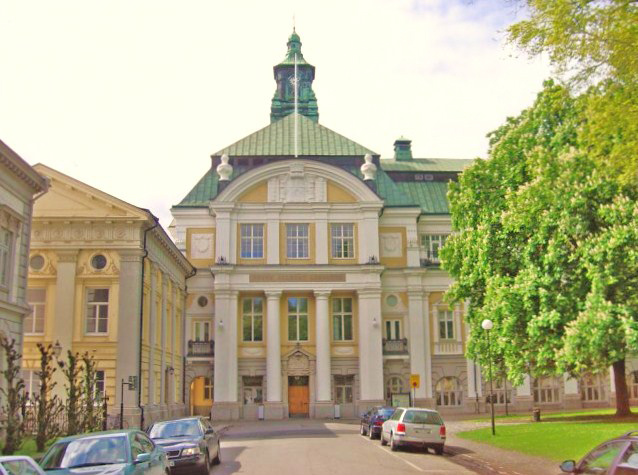
Per Brahe Secondary School

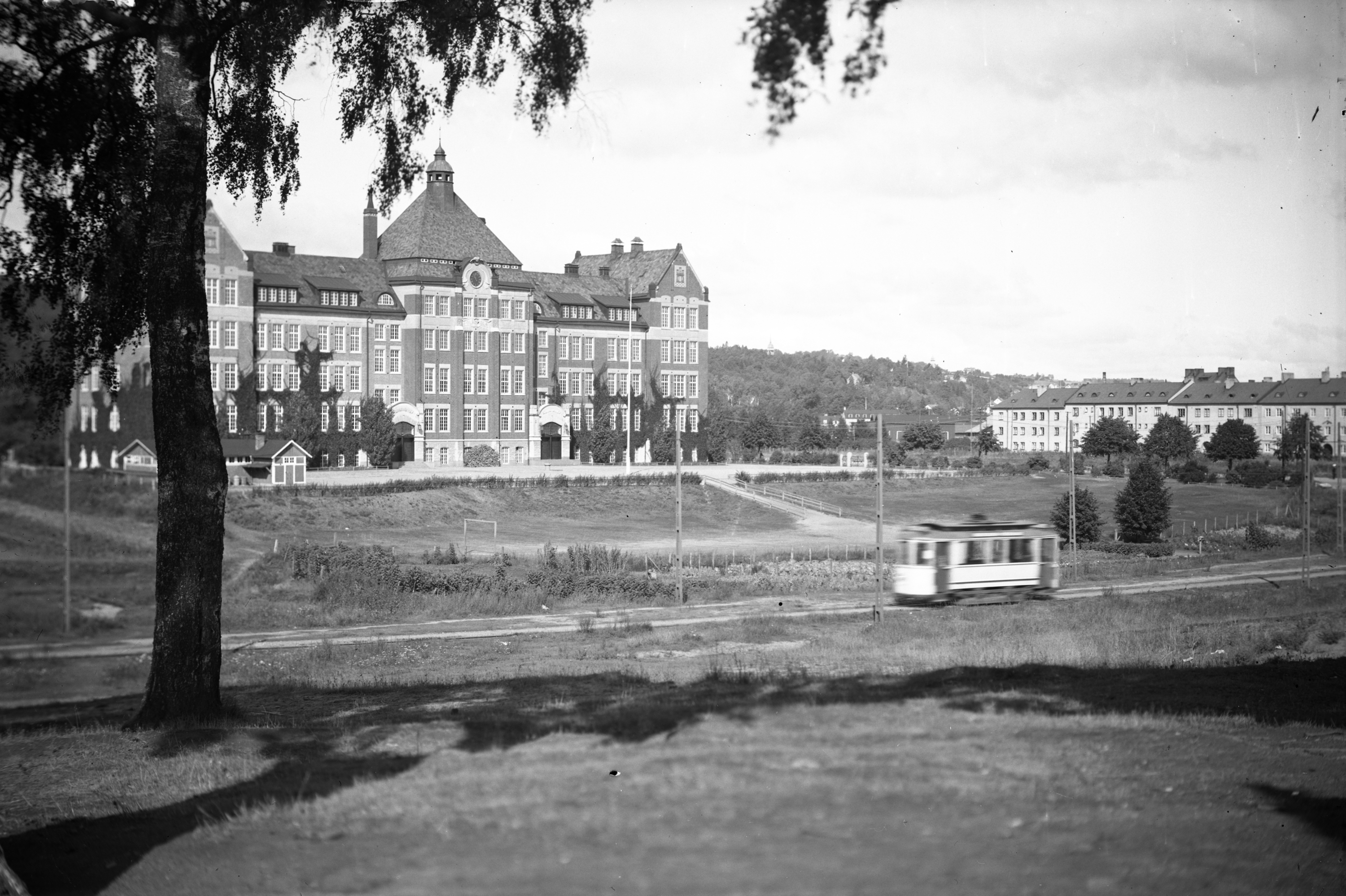
Torpa school

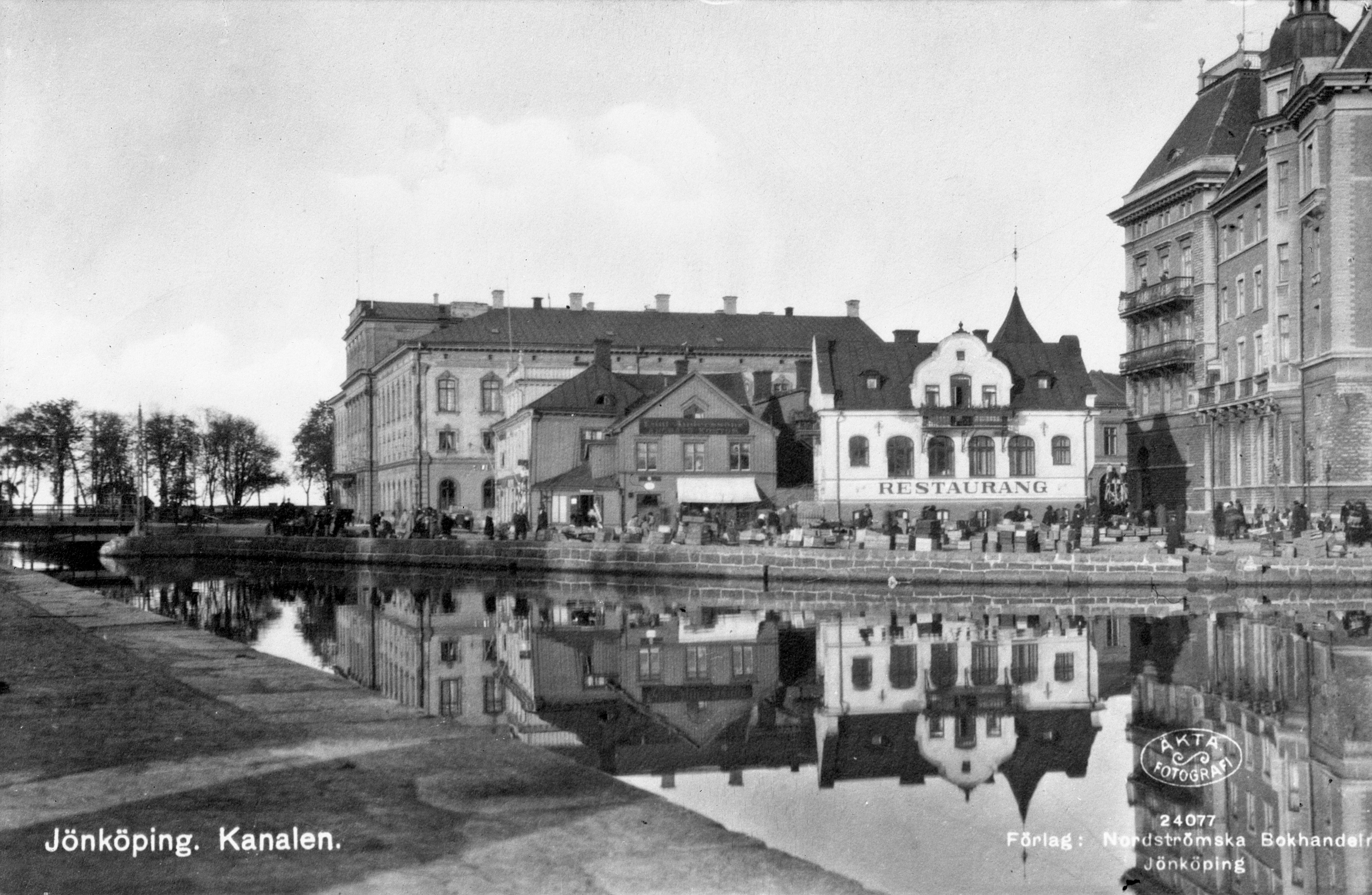
Kruckenbergska house
