= Listed buildings in Jönköping County =

There are 122 listed buildings (Swedish: byggnadsminne) in Jönköping County.

== Aneby Municipality ==
Image	Name	Premises	Number of buildings	Year built	Architect	Coordinates	ID
	Degla gård	Degla 1:1	1			57.93917°N 14.74533°E	21300000012624
	Idelunds möbelfabrik	Nöbbele 1:2, 1:4, 1:18	1			57.88552°N 14.76158°E	21300000012269

== Eksjö Municipality ==
Image	Name	Premises	Number of buildings	Year built	Architect	Coordinates	ID
	Albert Engström-museet, Eksjö museum|Husarmuseet (Eksjö museum)	Kopparslagaren 2 previously 4	3			57.66949°N 14.97061°E	21300000012357
	Apotekarvillan	Magistern 6	1			57.66926°N 14.97341°E	21300000012581
	Aschanska gården (Pukagården)	Guldsmeden 2	4			57.66768°N 14.97096°E	21300000012584
	Aschanska stallet	Vaxblekaren 11 previously Vaxblekaren 4 Vaxblekaren 7	2			57.66778°N 14.97139°E	21300000019905
	Biografbyggnaden	Boktryckaren 15	1			57.66740°N 14.96995°E	21300000012327
	Boktryckaren 1	Boktryckaren 1	2			57.66723°N 14.96991°E	21300000012294
	Boktryckaren 2	Boktryckaren 2	1			57.66753°N 14.96989°E	21300000012305
	Boktryckaren 4	Boktryckaren 4	1			57.66781°N 14.96973°E	21300000012308
	Boktryckaren 9	Boktryckaren 9	1			57.66837°N 14.96938°E	21300000012322
	Boktryckaren 10	Boktryckaren 10	1			57.66843°N 14.96933°E	21300000012325
	Boktryckaren 13	Boktryckaren 13	1			57.66830°N 14.96942°E	21300000012326
	Brännerigården	Brännerigården 7	1			57.66858°N 14.97058°E	21300000012346
	Brännerigården 1	Brännerigården 1	4			57.66903°N 14.97040°E	21300000012283
	Brännerigården 6	Brännerigården 6	1			57.66845°N 14.97072°E	21300000012344
	Cicelör Lundins gård	Ciselören 2 previously Cicelören 2	4			57.66860°N 14.97011°E	21300000012350
	Ciselören 3	Ciselören 3 previously Cicelören 3	4			57.66871°N 14.97000°E	21300000012351
	Ciselören 4	Ciselören 4 previously Cicelören 4	4			57.66883°N 14.96990°E	21300000012352
	Johan Björns gård	Ciselören 5 previously Cicelören 5	4			57.66894°N 14.96980°E	21300000012354
	Ciselören 6	Ciselören 6 previously Cicelören 6	1			57.66905°N 14.96960°E	21300000012356
	Eksjö Garnison med Officerspaviljongen Trianon	Lunnagård 1:1	20			57.67857°N 14.96713°E	21300000012747
	Flathult 1:4	Flathult 1:4	3			57.70646°N 15.05125°E	21300000012579
	Fornminnesgården	Kopparslagaren 2	1			57.66920°N 14.96977°E	21300000012416
	Forssellska gården	Ciselören 1 previously Cicelören 1	4			57.66844°N 14.97027°E	21300000012348
	Gamla Färgeriet, Färgaregården	Färgaren 3 [del av] Stadsäga 400	2			57.66904°N 14.96874°E	21300000012419
	Färgaren 3 fd. magasinbyggnad	Färgaren 3	none				21300000012361
	Peder Skomakares gård (Falleniuska gården)	Färgaren 3 [del av]	1			57.66876°N 14.96903°E	21300000012420
	Gatumarken i den norra stadskärnan i Eksjö	Gamla stan 1:1	none				21300000020453
	Gelbgjutaren 3	Gelbgjutaren 3	3			57.67027°N 14.96926°E	21300000012364
	Guldsmeden 3	Guldsmeden 3	4			57.66791°N 14.97073°E	21300000012366
	Guldsmedsgården	Guldsmeden 1	3			57.66750°N 14.97112°E	21300000012365
	Handskmakaren 5	Handskmakaren 5 previously 3	1			57.67057°N 14.96867°E	21300000012367
	Heidemanska gården	Boktryckaren 5	2			57.66793°N 14.96948°E	21300000012310
	Hässleby sanatorium	Hässleby 2:2	7			57.62886°N 15.56939°E	21300000012461
	Julles gjuteri, mekaniska verkstad	Åsmedjan 1 previously Mariannelund 9:1 m fl	5			57.61618°N 15.57517°E	21300000012787
	Komministern 1	Komministern 1	1			57.66804°N 14.97061°E	21300000012369
	Komministern 2	Komministern 2	4			57.66821°N 14.97045°E	21300000012370
	Kopparslagaren 2	Kopparslagaren 2 previously Brännerigården 2	1			57.66919°N 14.97081°E	21300000012424
	Kopparslagaren 3	Kopparslagaren 3	2			57.66905°N 14.97004°E	21300000012372
	Krukmakaregården	Boktryckaren 7	2			57.66818°N 14.96936°E	21300000012318
	Krusagården	Färgaren 4	1			57.66914°N 14.96933°E	21300000012412
	Melanderska gården	Vaxblekaren 11	2			57.66766°N 14.97166°E	21300000012392
	Nordströmska gården	Boktryckaren 6	3			57.66805°N 14.96938°E	21300000012314
	Rektorsgården	Rektorn 1	2			57.66816°N 14.96987°E	21300000012373
	Societeten 2	Societeten 2	1			57.66834°N 14.96961°E	21300000012374
	Societetshuset Societeten 1	1			57.66872°N 14.96947°E	21300000012377	
	Stora Torget; Banken 2	Banken 2	2			57.66652°N 14.97215°E	21300000012696
	Stora Torget; Borgen 1	Borgen 1	1			57.66646°N 14.97148°E	21300000012692
	Stora Torget; Borgen 2	Borgen 2	4			57.66636°N 14.97102°E	21300000012329
	Stora Torget; Borgen 3	Borgen 3	2			57.66637°N 14.97057°E	21300000012339
	Stora Torget; Borgen 4	Borgen 4	2			57.66622°N 14.97043°E	21300000012689
	Stora Torget, Eksjö Rådhus|Rådhuset 1	Rådhuset 1	1			57.66684°N 14.96994°E	21300000012698
	Stora Torget; Torget	Gamla stan 1:2	none				21300000021667
	Tigern 1	Tigern 1	3			57.66610°N 14.97325°E	21300000012381
	Tigern 2	Tigern 2	3			57.66586°N 14.97344°E	21300000012385
	Trollegården	Boktryckaren 3	1			57.66768°N 14.96982°E	21300000012342
	Vaxblekaren 1 (Fagerbergska gården)	Vaxblekaren 1	2			57.66832°N 14.97096°E	21300000012390
	Vaxblekaren 10	Vaxblekaren 10	1			57.66840°N 14.97125°E	21300000012394
	Vaxblekargården	Vaxblekaren 2,12, 13	4			57.66814°N 14.97111°E	21300000012386
	Villa Lustigkulle	Lustigkulle 5 previously Stg 587	1			57.65753°N 14.97337°E	21300000012405
	Vinskänken 2	Vinskänken 2	1			57.66748°N 14.97065°E	21300000012401
	Vinskänken 3	Vinskänken 3	1			57.66733°N 14.97046°E	21300000012398
	Winrothska gården	Garvaren 5	2			57.66950°N 14.96960°E	21300000012362
	Ägergöls skola	Ägersgöl 1:11	2			57.67771°N 15.13032°E	21300000012455

== Gislaved Municipality ==
Image	Name	Premises	Number of buildings	Year built	Architect	Coordinates	ID
	Hökabo soldattorp	Häljarp 1:7	1			57.11482°N 13.61333°E	21300000012537
	Norra Hestra hembygdsgård	Norra Hestra Kyrkobol 1:7	3			57.43831°N 13.58731°E	21300000012519
	Reftele tingshus	Ölmestad 8:9	1			57.17528°N 13.59147°E	21300000012548
	Nybron över Nissan	Båraryd by	1			57.34129°N 13.55409°E	21000001660561

== Gnosjö Municipality ==
Image	Name	Premises	Number of buildings	Year built	Architect	Coordinates	ID
	Bårebo missionshus	Bårebo 1:18	1			57.30940°N 13.75344°E	21300000012494
	Hylténs metallvarufabrik	Gårö 1:270	11			57.34121°N 13.73551°E	21300000012497

== Habo Municipality ==
There are no listed buildings in Habo Municipality.

== Jönköping Municipality ==
Image	Name	Premises	Number of buildings	Year built	Architect	Coordinates	ID
	Gamla Countysresidenset, Jönköping	Blixten 7 previously Blixten 1	1	after 1790		57.78162°N 14.18283°E	21300000012570
	Brahe 10 i Gränna	1			58.02088°N 14.46556°E	21300000012428	
	Museigatan 3, 5 Jönköping	Dolken 11	2			57.78080°N 14.17667°E	21300000012479
	Gamla Polishuset, Jönköping	Götaland 5 previously Guvernören 1	1	1937	Göran Pauli	57.77998°N 14.16597°E	21300000012753
	Automobilpalatset; Jönköping	Harpan 2	1			57.78261°N 14.16129°E	21300000012446
	Björnebergs gård	Björneberg 1:1; Siggarp Södergård 1:1; Norrgård 2:1	9			57.81026°N 14.12627°E	21300000012576
	Eklundshovs vattenverk (Kortebo 2:4	del av), 2:171	2			57.81829°N 14.15548°E	21300000012450
	Franckska gården i Gränna	Hjorten 3	1			58.02191°N 14.46675°E	21300000012434
	Fågelmuseet	Skänkeberg 1:1 previously stadsäga 825	1			57.78144°N 14.14468°E	21300000012491
	Gamla Braheskolan	Kumlaby 10:1	1			58.05355°N 14.34653°E	21300000012740
	Gamla Rådhuset, Jönköping	Antiken 1	1			57.78173°N 14.17567°E	21300000012465
	Gränna pedagogi	Brahe 2	1			58.02098°N 14.46568°E	21300000012426
	Gränna prästgård	Biskopen 10 previously stadsägoområde 37, 38	13			58.02125°N 14.46365°E	21300000012627
	Gunillabergs herrgård	Gunillaberg 1:7 previously Gunillaberg med Tykåsen 1:7	4			57.75704°N 13.81847°E	21300000012620
	Göta hovrätt	Arkivet 1	2			57.78105°N 14.17598°E	21300000012472
	Hallska gården i Gränna	Välviljan 6	7			58.02188°N 14.46560°E	21300000012438
	Hotell Brahe	Välviljan 4	1			58.02133°N 14.46547°E	21300000012567
	Residenset, Jönköping	Gullvivan 17	2	1884–86	Johan Fredrik Åbom; Herman Holmgren	57.78164°N 14.16609°E	21300000012511
	Klockaregården, Jönköping	Bikten 1 previously Björnen 1	5			57.78194°N 14.18035°E	21300000012786
	Ängsfors vattenkraftverk	Röret 1:20	1			57.72815°N 14.11715°E	21300000012701
	Kungsladorna i Visingsö kronopark	Visingsborg 3:1 (del av	3			58.03609°N 14.34627°E	21300000012631
	Lyckås herrgård	Lyckås 2:1, 2:5	5			57.88043°N 14.34929°E	21300000012551
	Millqvistska gården, klockgjutaregården	Bikten 10 previously Björnen 10	3			57.78174°N 14.18083°E	21300000012501
	Remma by	Remma 1:2	4			57.58861°N 13.77443°E	21300000013009
	Slottsvillan, Huskvarna	Herrgården 2 Stg 62 V	1			57.78584°N 14.28633°E	21300000012458
	Visingsö sockenmagasin	Tunnerstad 26:1	1			58.04801°N 14.34107°E	21300000012563
	Strömsbergs gård	Strömsberg 3:3, 3:4 previously stadsäga 183 P	1			57.75238°N 14.18303°E	21300000012515
	Tändsticksmuseet	Jönköpings tändsticksfabrik 1 previously Stg 1212	1			57.78466°N 14.15961°E	21300000012490
	von Otterska villan i Gränna	Föreningen 1	1			58.01975°N 14.46423°E	21300000012431
	Örserums gamla skola	Örserum 7:1	1			58.00928°N 14.57146°E	21300000012444
	Östanå gård	Östanå 1:6, 1:36	5			57.96316°N 14.50317°E	21300000012741

== Mullsjö Municipality ==
Image	Name	Premises	Number of buildings	Year built	Architect	Coordinates	ID
	Bönareds komministerboställe	Bönared 1:1	3			57.83547°N 13.85077°E	21300000012783
	Näs gård	Näs 4:6	9			57.86186°N 13.77907°E	21300000012539

== Nässjö Municipality ==
Image	Name	Premises	Number of buildings	Year built	Architect	Coordinates	ID
	Bröderna Karlssons köpmansgård	Kungsörnen 7 previously stg 204–207	4			57.50528°N 14.69809°E	21300000012523
	Knutstorps herrgård	Knutstorp 2:1	1			57.75953°N 14.86291°E	21300000012492
	Nässjö lokstall	Nässjö 13:5	1			57.66114°N 14.68395°E	21300000023110
	Nässjö stadshus	Örnen 1	1			57.65343°N 14.69742°E	21300000012546
	Villa Sola	Södra Äng 2:2	6			57.67407°N 14.85592°E	21300000012542

== Sävsjö Municipality ==
There are no listed buildings in Sävsjö Municipality.

== Tranås Municipality ==
Image	Name	Premises	Number of buildings	Year built	Architect	Coordinates	ID
	Adelövs marknadsbodar	Nostorp 5:1	1			58.01425°N 14.66831°E	21300000012608
	Gripenbergs slott	Gripenberg 4:2	5			57.99803°N 14.89498°E	21300000012612
	Göberga herrgård	Göberga 1:34 previously Göberga 1:2	3			58.01029°N 14.84682°E	21300000012616
	Sionskapellet i Sommen	Rockebro 7:75	1			58.13813°N 14.96511°E	21300000012553
	Tranås stadshus	Stadshuset 1(previously Lövstad 1	1			58.03286°N 14.97866°E	21300000012606

== Vaggeryd Municipality ==
Image	Name	Premises	Number of buildings	Year built	Architect	Coordinates	ID
	Kvarnabergs fd vagnhjulsmakeri	Kvarnaberg 2:1	1			57.53380°N 14.06472°E	21300000012602
	Skillingarydslägren	Lägret 1:1	40			57.42816°N 14.10412°E	21300000012636
	Ståha-stugan	Mörkhult 1:9	2			57.37096°N 14.17900°E	21300000012506

== Vetlanda Municipality ==
Image	Name	Premises	Number of buildings	Year built	Architect	Coordinates	ID
	Noaks ark, previously Borohus virkesmagasin	Trishult 5:1	1			57.36196°N 14.90390°E	21320000018998
	Sollinska huset	Trasten 5	1			57.42499°N 15.08210°E	21300000012560
	Stenmagasinet i Ädelfors	Repperda 3:22	1			57.41386°N 15.31949°E	21300000012601
	Svedbomska villan	Felsteget 8	1			57.42768°N 15.08859°E	21300000012555
	Wallby säteri	Vallby 1:1	2			57.36081°N 15.37528°E	21300000012550

== Värnamo Municipality ==
Image	Name	Premises	Number of buildings	Year built	Architect	Coordinates	ID
	Bruno Mathssons villa	Rolstorp 5:4	1			57.06516°N 14.03980°E	21000001107600
	Eds herrgård	Ed 1:33	7			57.08476°N 14.16957°E	21300000012587
	Hörle herrgård	Hörle 2:1	1			57.26384°N 14.05779°E	21300000012593
	Moens gård	Hindsekind 1:13	6			57.17600°N 14.25315°E	21300000012594
	Åminne bruk	Helmershus 6:52, 6:53	5			57.12456°N 14.01055°E	21300000022398
