= Jönköping Theatre =

Theatre in Jönköping, Sweden

Coordinates: 57.7817°N 14.1711°E

- Jönköpings teater
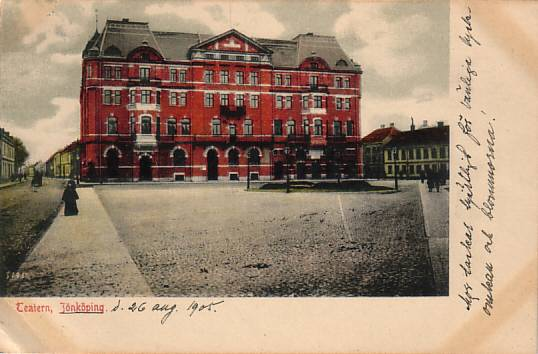
- Jönköping Theatre (postcard sent in 1905)
- Interactive map of Jönköping Theatre

Construction
- Opened: 2 December 1904

The Jönköping Theatre (Swedish: Jönköpings teater) is a theatre in Jönköping, Sweden, with a seating capacity for 356. The theatre is also used for concerts. The theatre is located in the same building as Grand Hotel.

== History ==
Theater in Jönköping dates back to 1600s, performances were initially held in temporary buildings. Jönköping got its first theater building in 1770s. The current building, which was inaugurated on 2 December 1904, replaced a wooden theater building that stood in this location since 1825.
