= Hovrättstorget =

Town square in Jönköping

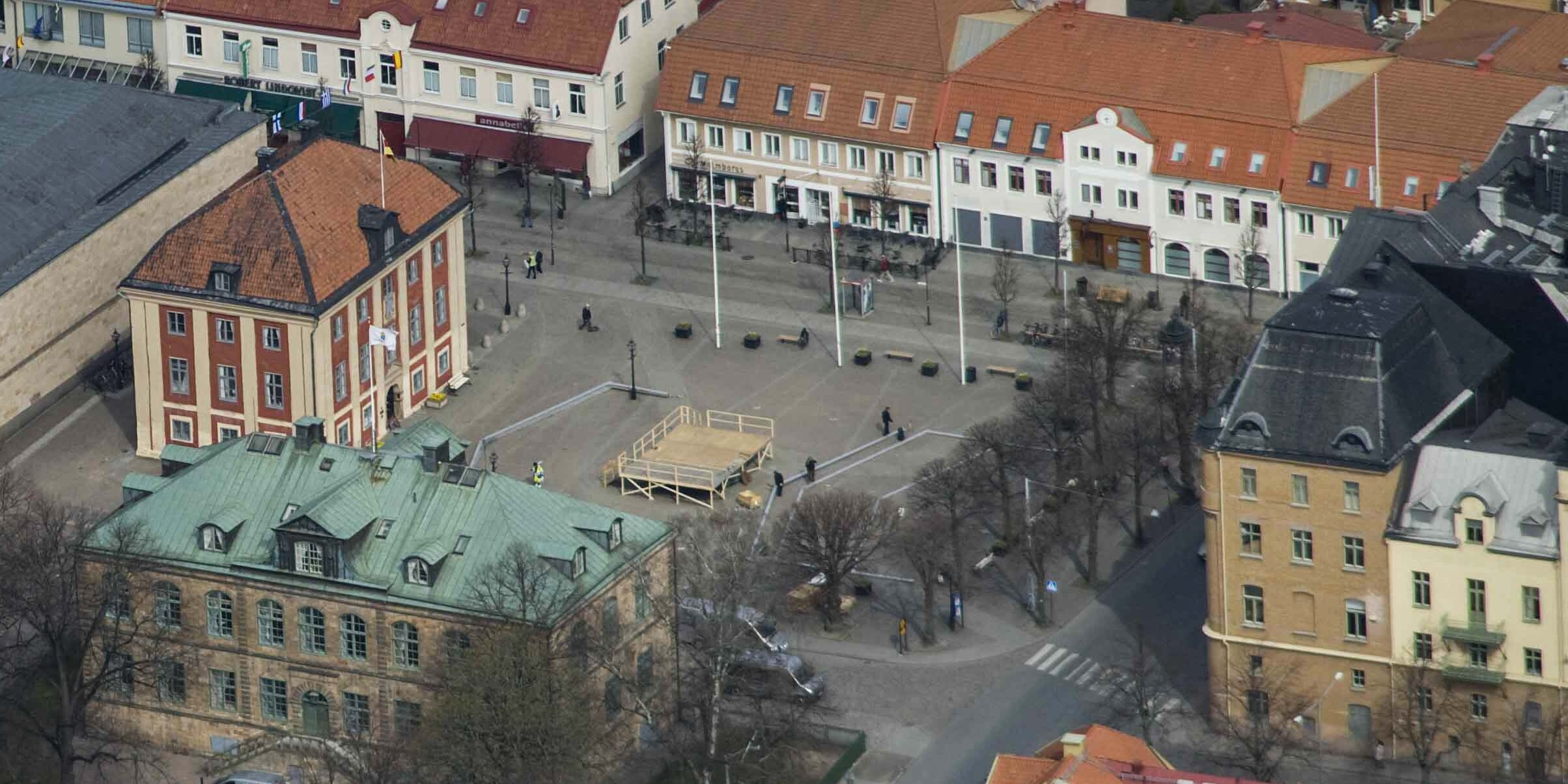
- Interactive map of Hovrättstorget
- Native name: Hovrättstorget (Swedish)
- Former names: Stora torget Stortorget; Torget
- Location: Jönköping, Sweden
- Postal code: 553 21
- Coordinates: 57°46′54″N 14°10′34″E

Hovrättstorget, (Swedish for Square of The Court of Appeals) is a town square in central Jönköping. Hovrättstorget was created in 1612 and soon became the city's main market place. It was initially called Stora torget (Swedish for The Big Square).

The Court of Appeals building was constructed next to the square and inaugurated in 1665. Some of Jönköping's oldest still surviving buildings are located around the square.

== Gallery ==
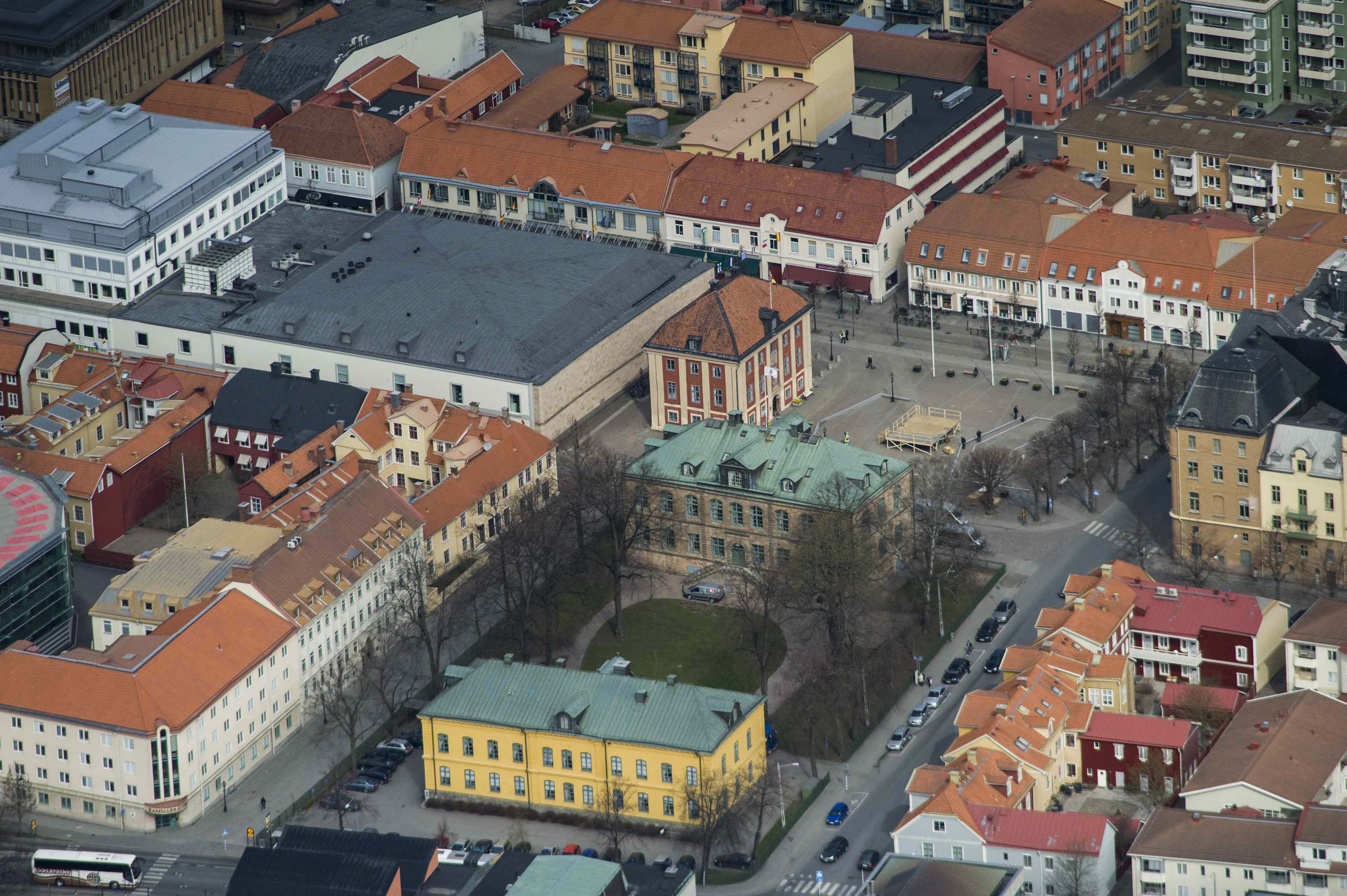
Wider area from air

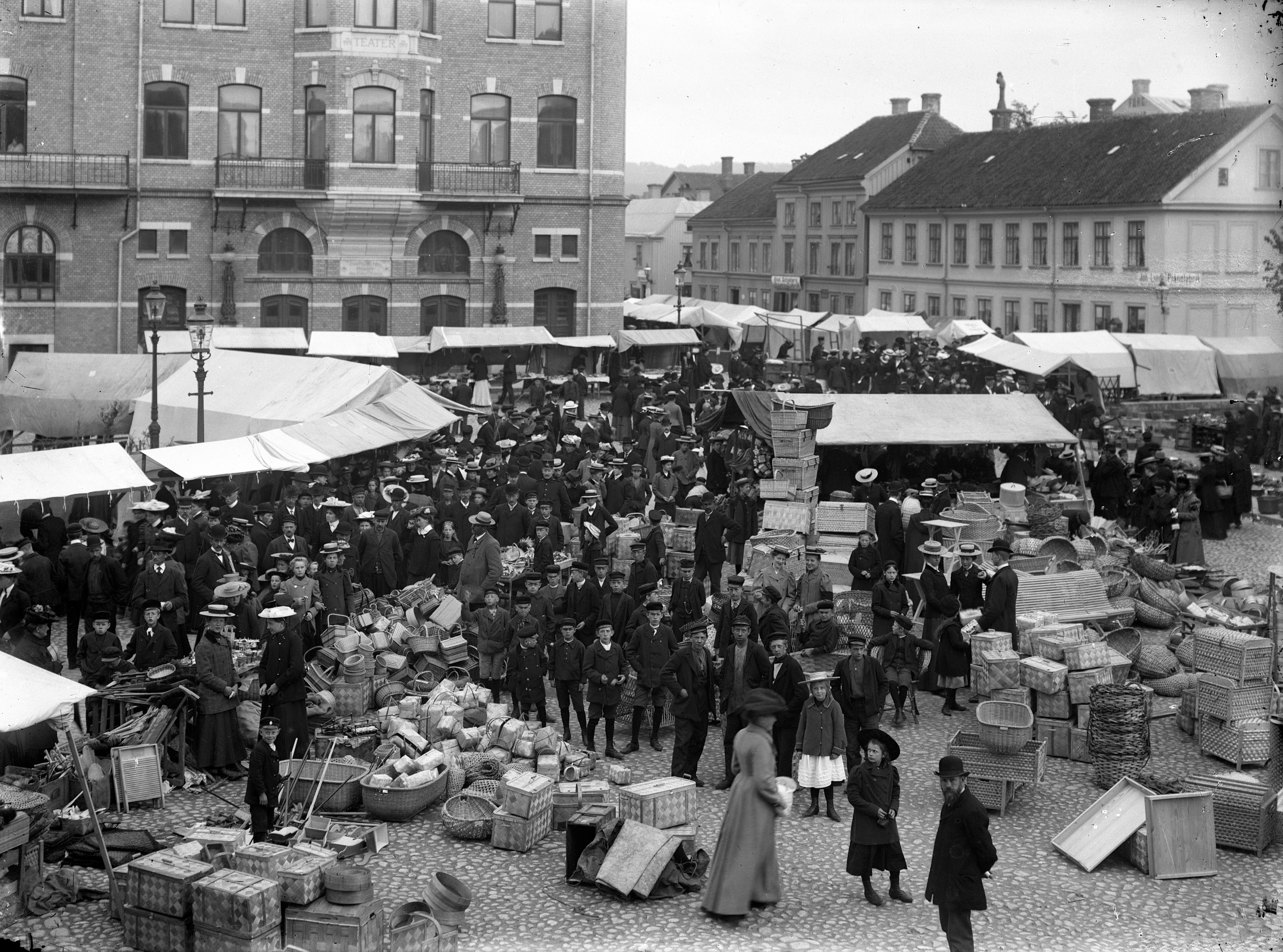
Market at Hovrättstorget, early 20th century

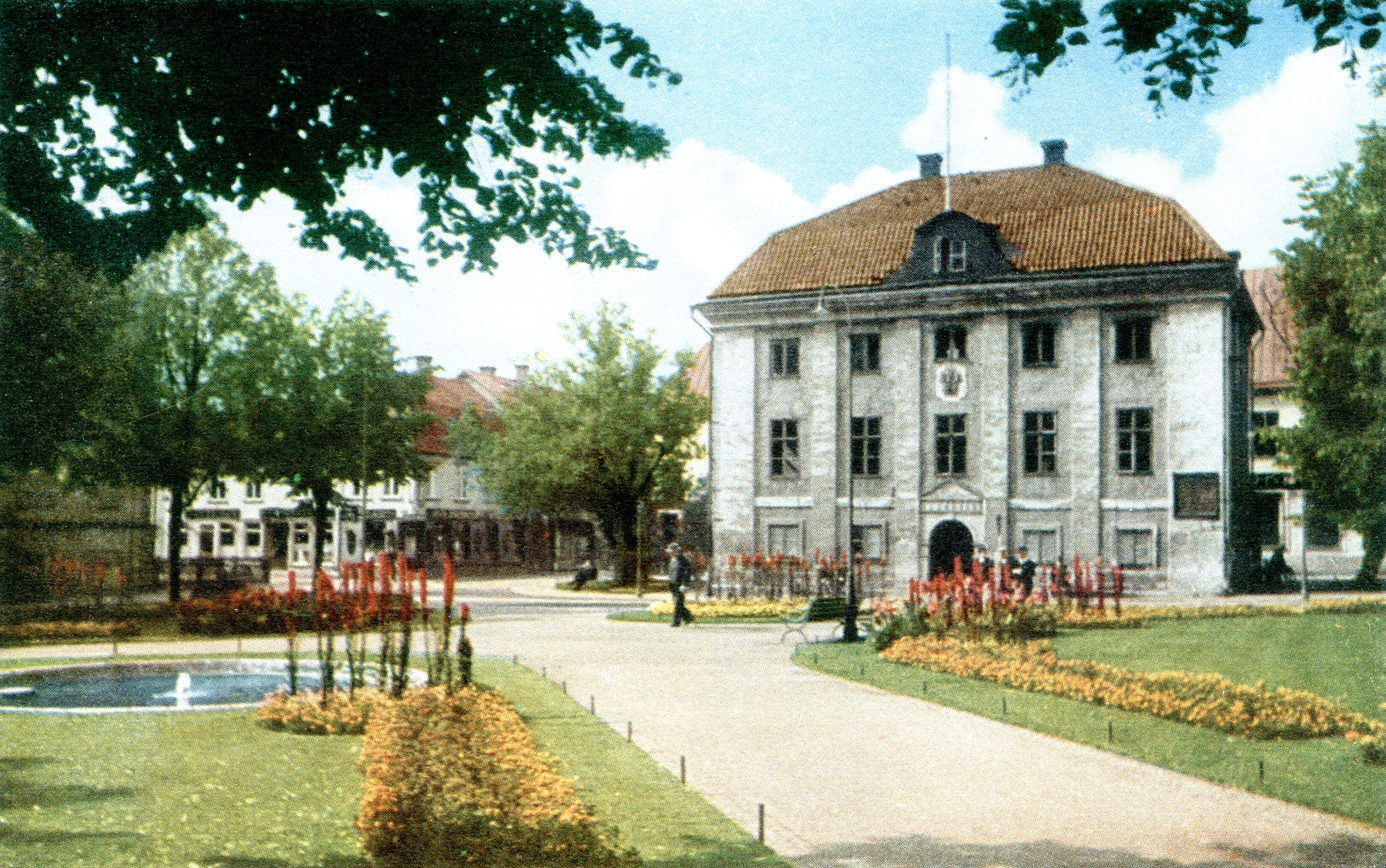
Hovrättstorget as a park, first half of the 20th century

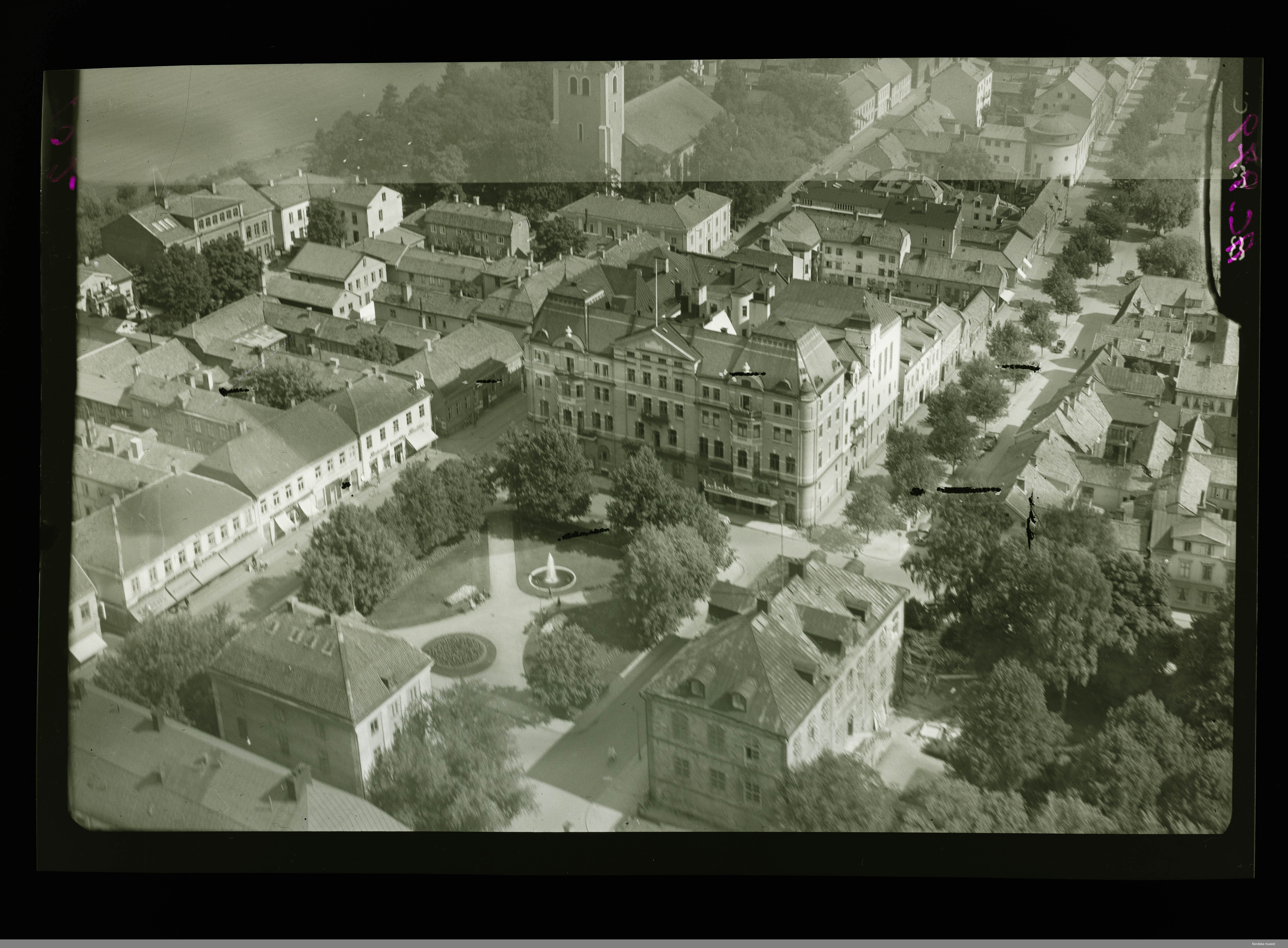
Hovrättstorget with Grand Hotel in the center (photographed from the air in 1948)
