= Eastern Chapel =

- Östra Kapellet
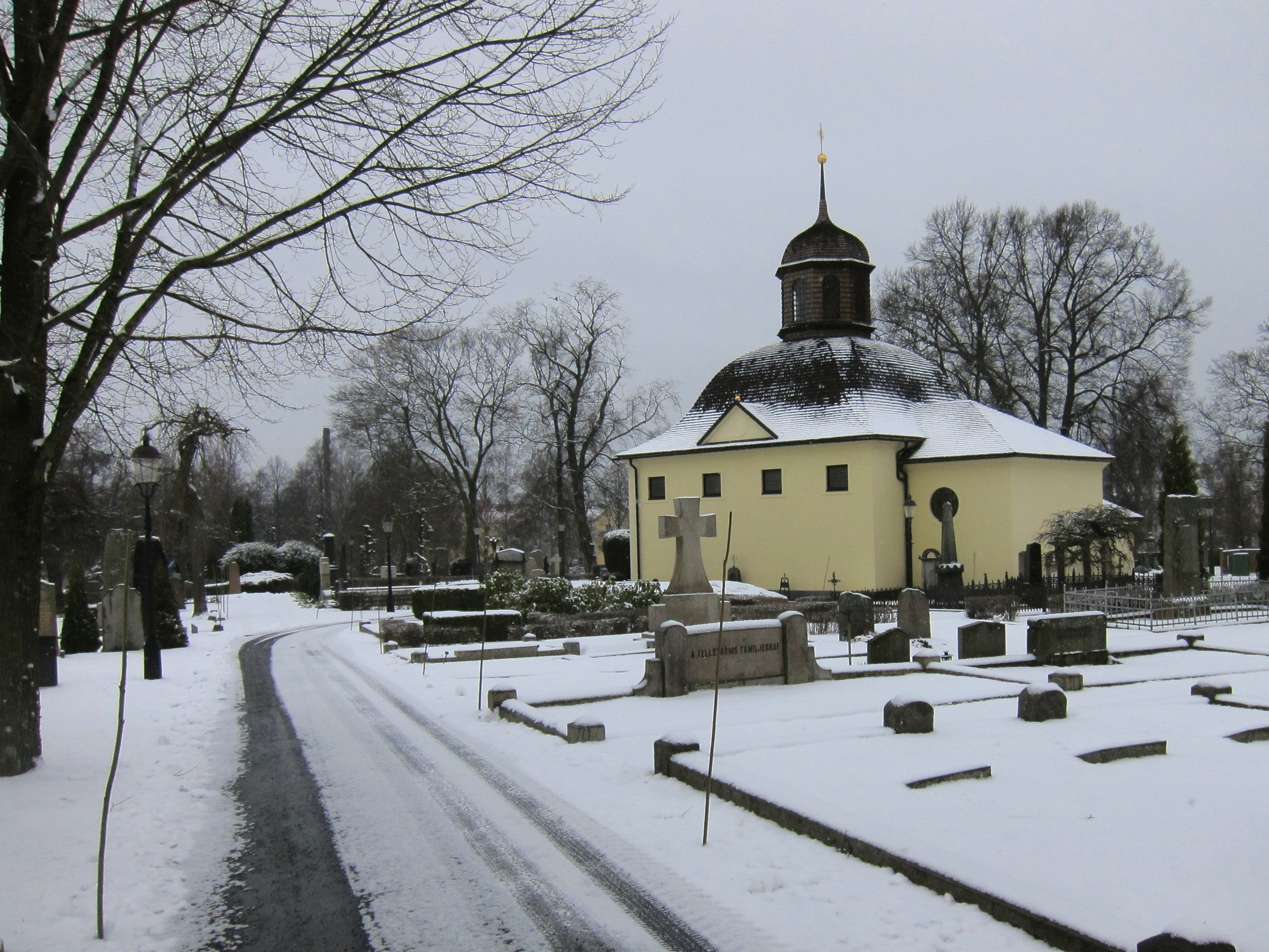
- Eastern Chapel (winter of 2015)
- Eastern Chapel
- 57°46′41″N 14°11′55″E
- Location: Hermansvägen 14, 554 53, Jönköping
- Country: Sweden
- Denomination: Church of Sweden

History
- Consecrated: 1937

Specifications
- Capacity: 80 people

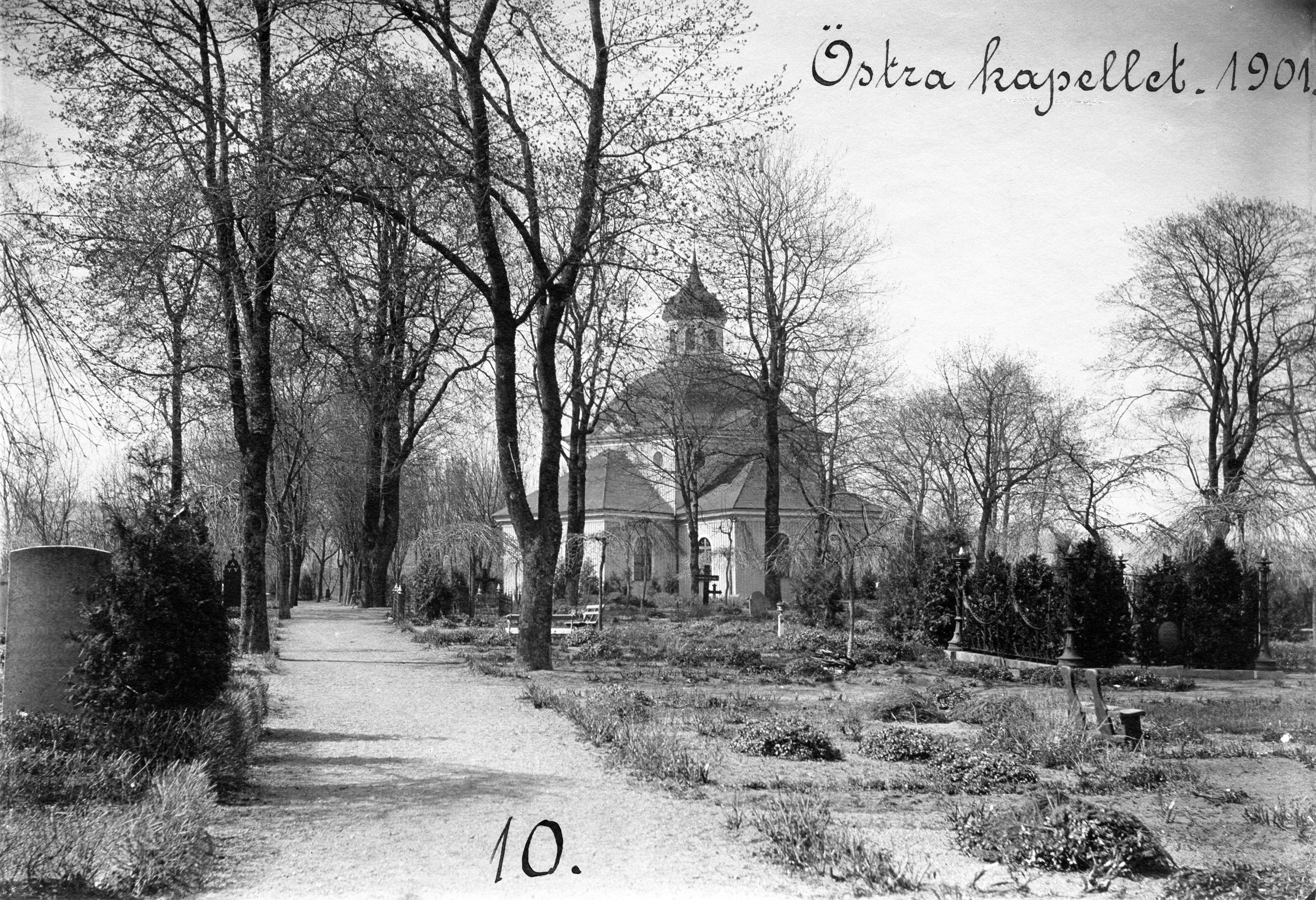
Earlier church that burnt down, photographed in 1901

Eastern Chapel (Swedish: Östra Kapellet) is a church building in Jönköping in Sweden. Belonging to the Church of Sweden, the current building was opened in 1937. Throughout history, several wooden churches stood in this location, which were destroyed by fires. The earliest known mention of a church on this location dates back to 1644 and the earliest known mention of a graveyard dates back to 1636.
