= Grand Hotel, Jönköping =

Coordinates: 57.7816°N 14.1770°E

Grand Hotel Jönköping
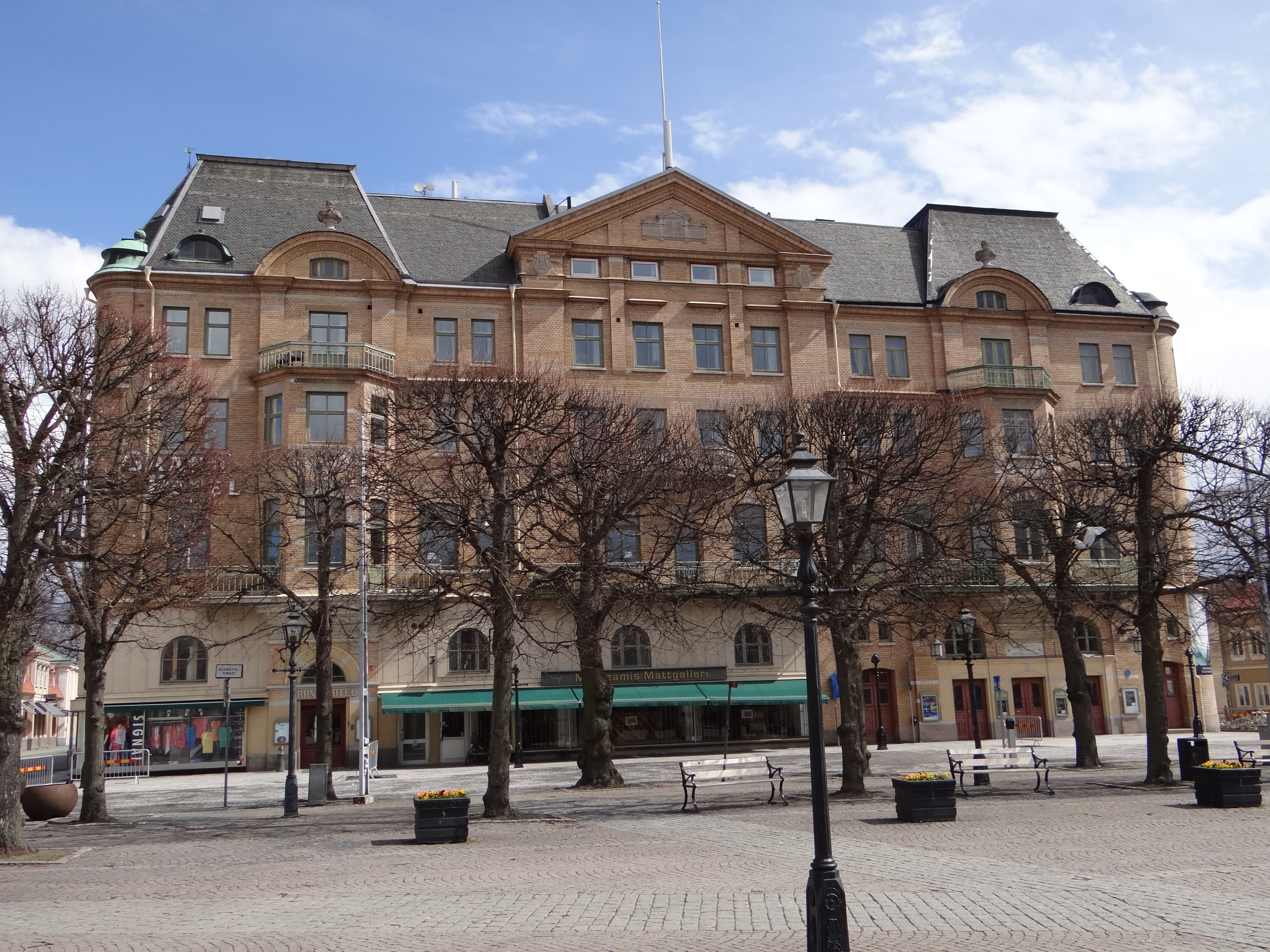
- Grand Hotel in Jönköping
- Interactive map of the Grand Hotel Jönköping area
- Hotel chain: Best Western Signature Collection (2025)

General information
- Location: Hovrättstorget 1 SE 553 21, Jönköping, Sweden
- Completed: 1905

Technical details
- Floor count: 5

Design and construction
- Architect: August Atterström

Other information
- Number of units: 53
- Number of restaurants: 1
- Number of bars: 1

Website
- Official website

Grand Hotel is a historic hotel in central Jönköping, housed in a culturally protected building, that it shares with the Jönköping Theatre.

The hotel is located near the shores of Lake Vättern, on Hovrättstorget — a square that has some of Jönköping’s oldest surviving buildings.

Designed by August Atterström, the city architect at the time, the Grand Hotel opened in 1905. It has been renovated and upgraded several times since its construction more than 100 years ago. The hotel initially didn't have a gym or fitness center and now offers a full size gym 150 meters away from the main building.

At the end of 2024, the hotel was sold to entrepreneurs who manage several Best Western hotels in Småland.

== Gallery ==
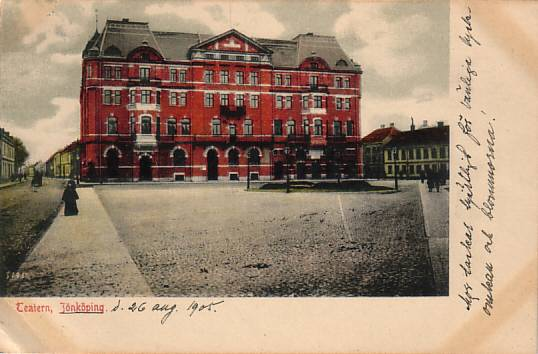
Grand Hotel Jönköping on a postcard from 1905

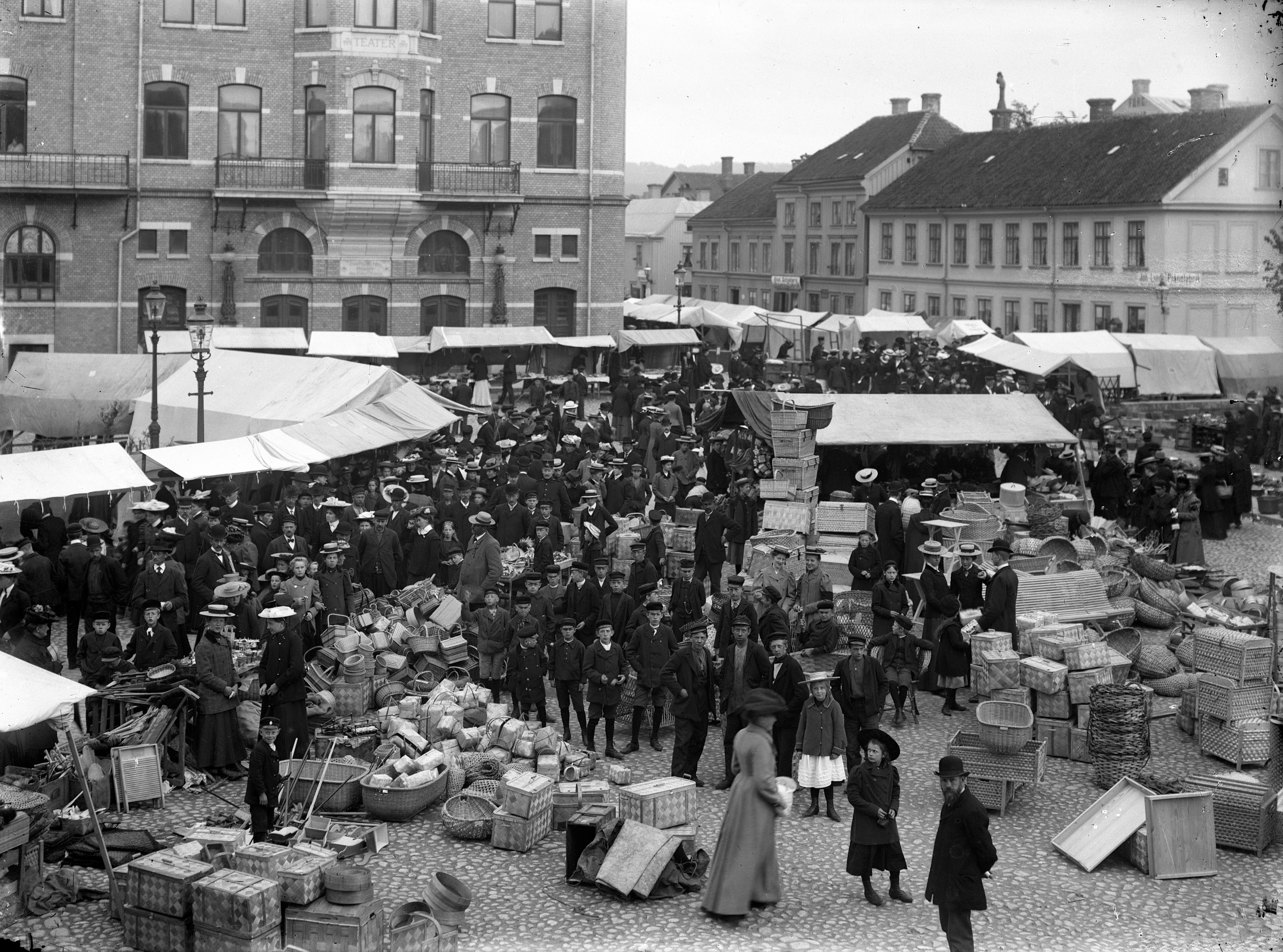
Market at Hovrättstorget with Grand Hotel in the background, early 20th century

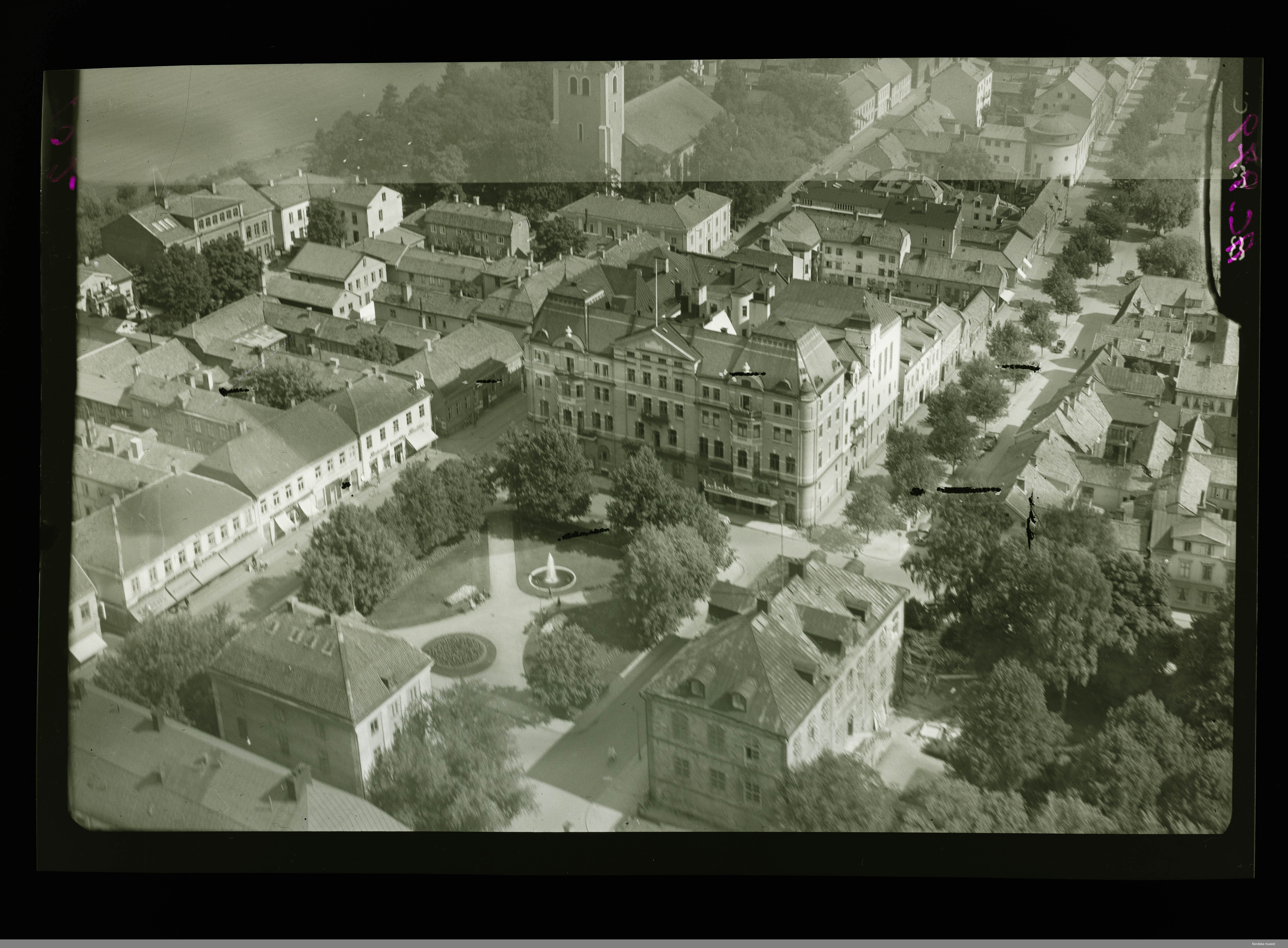
Grand Hotel photographed from the air in 1948
