= Ekhagen Church =

Coordinates: 57.7778°N 14.2241°E

- Ekhagskyrkan
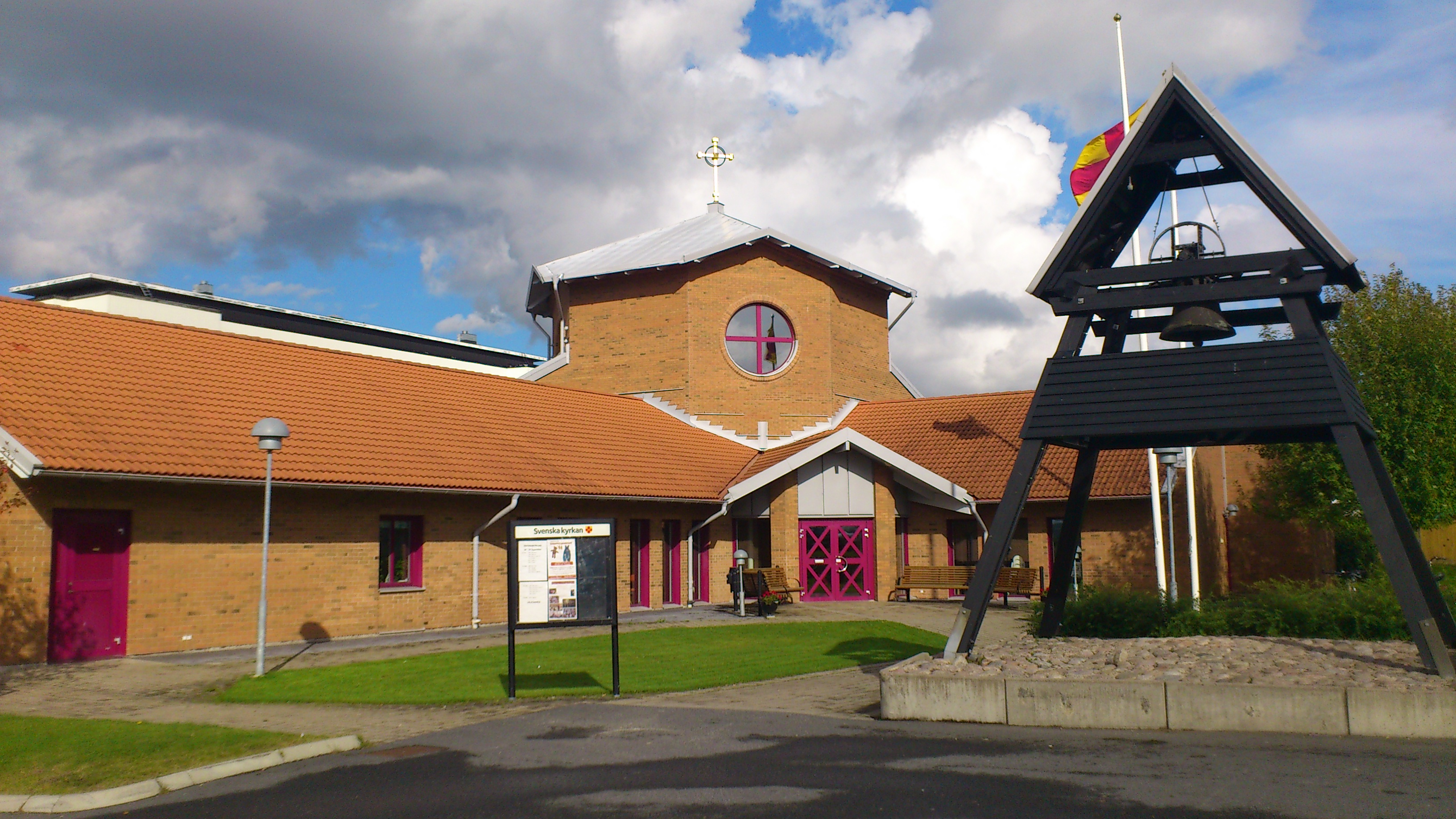
- Ekhagen Church in September 2012
- Ekhagen Church
- Location: Ekhagen
- Country: Sweden
- Denomination: Church of Sweden

History
- Consecrated: 12 May 1996

Administration
- Diocese: Växjö
- Parish: Kristina-Ljungarum

Ekhagen Church (Swedish: Ekhagskyrkan) is a church building at Ekhagen in Jönköping in Sweden, belonging to the Kristina-Ljungarum of the Church of Sweden. It was inaugurated on 12 May 1996 by Bishop Anders Wejryd, replacing the former temporary church that stood in Ekhagen between 1968 and mid 1995.
