= Sofia Church, Jönköping =

Coordinates: 57.7819°N 14.1597°E

Sofia Church
- Sofiakyrkan
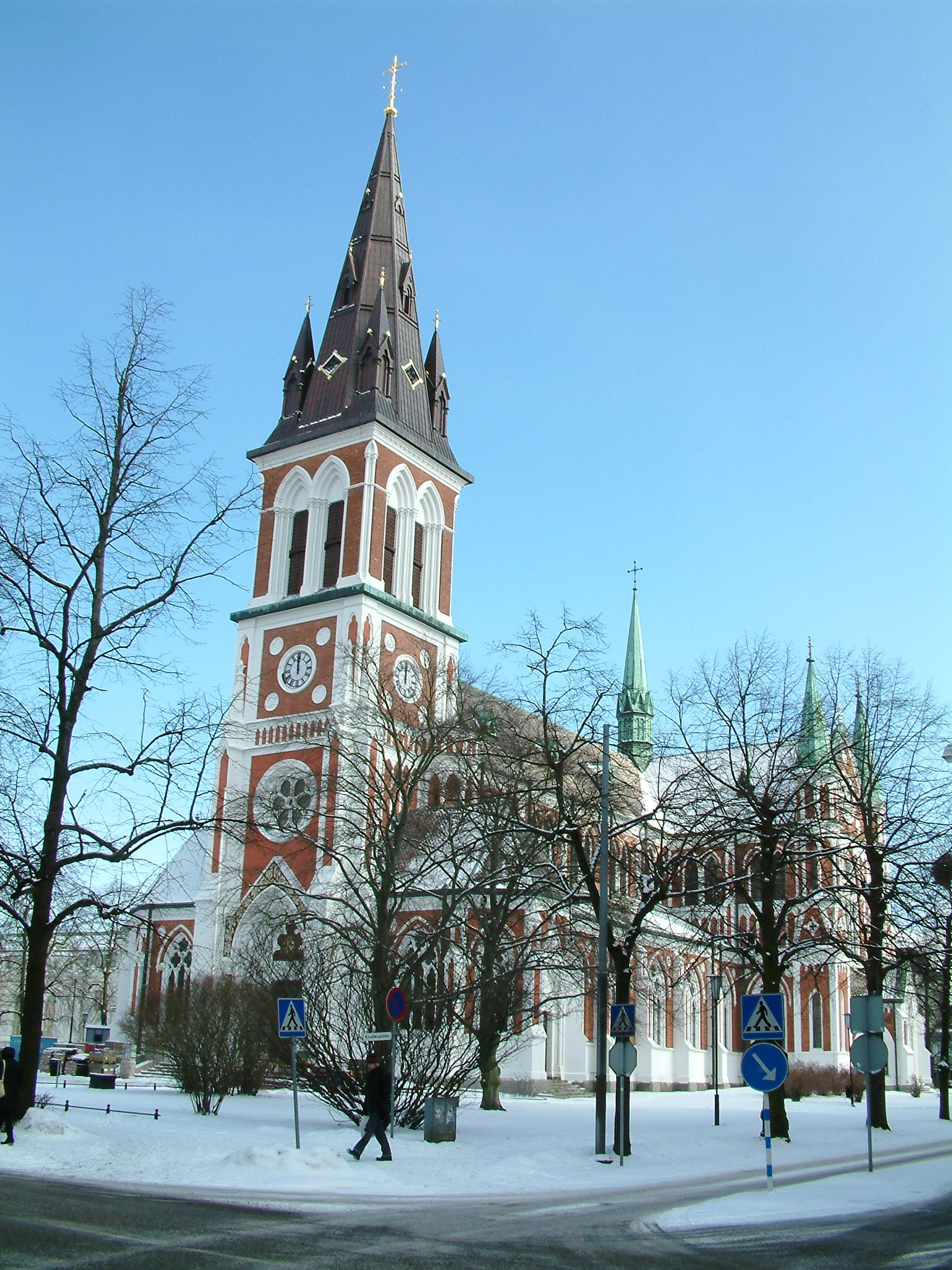
- Sofia Church
- Sofia Church
- Location: Jönköping
- Country: Sweden
- Denomination: Church of Sweden

History
- Dedication: Queen Sofia of Sweden
- Consecrated: 8 April 1888

Administration
- Diocese: Växjö
- Parish: Sofia-Järstorp

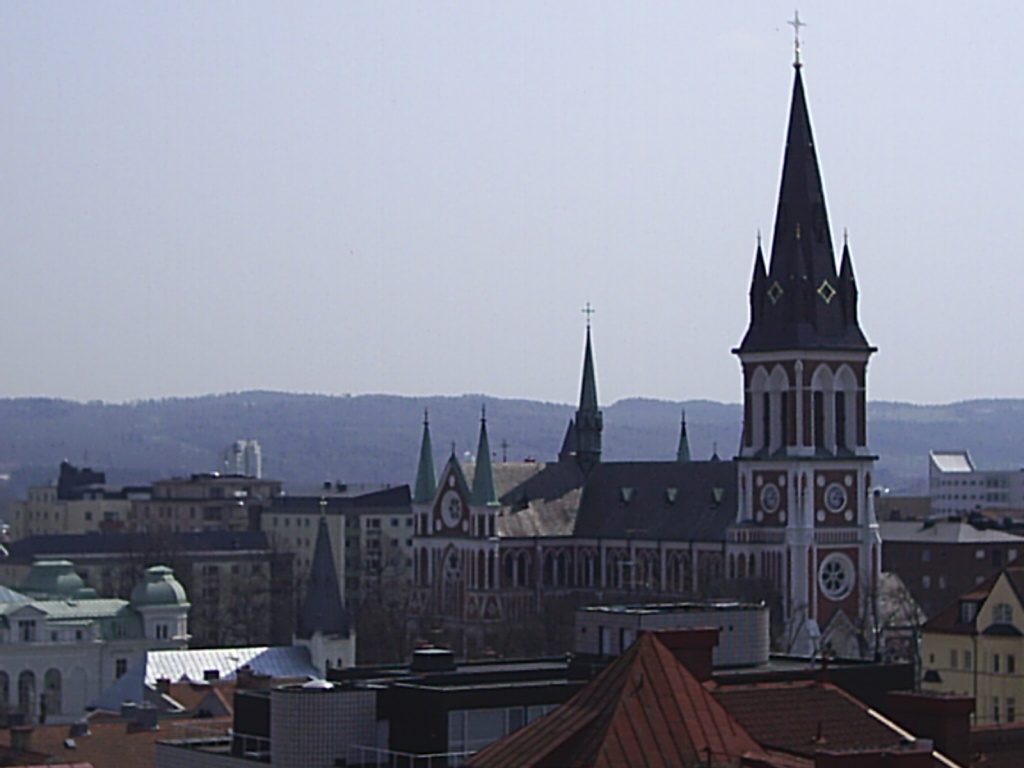
Sofia Church

Sofia Church (Swedish: Sofiakyrkan) is a church building in western Jönköping in Sweden. Belonging to Sofia-Järstorp Parish of the Church of Sweden, it was opened on 8 April 1888, on Octave of Easter.
