= Österängen Church =

Coordinates: 57.7858°N 14.2443°E

- Österängskyrkan
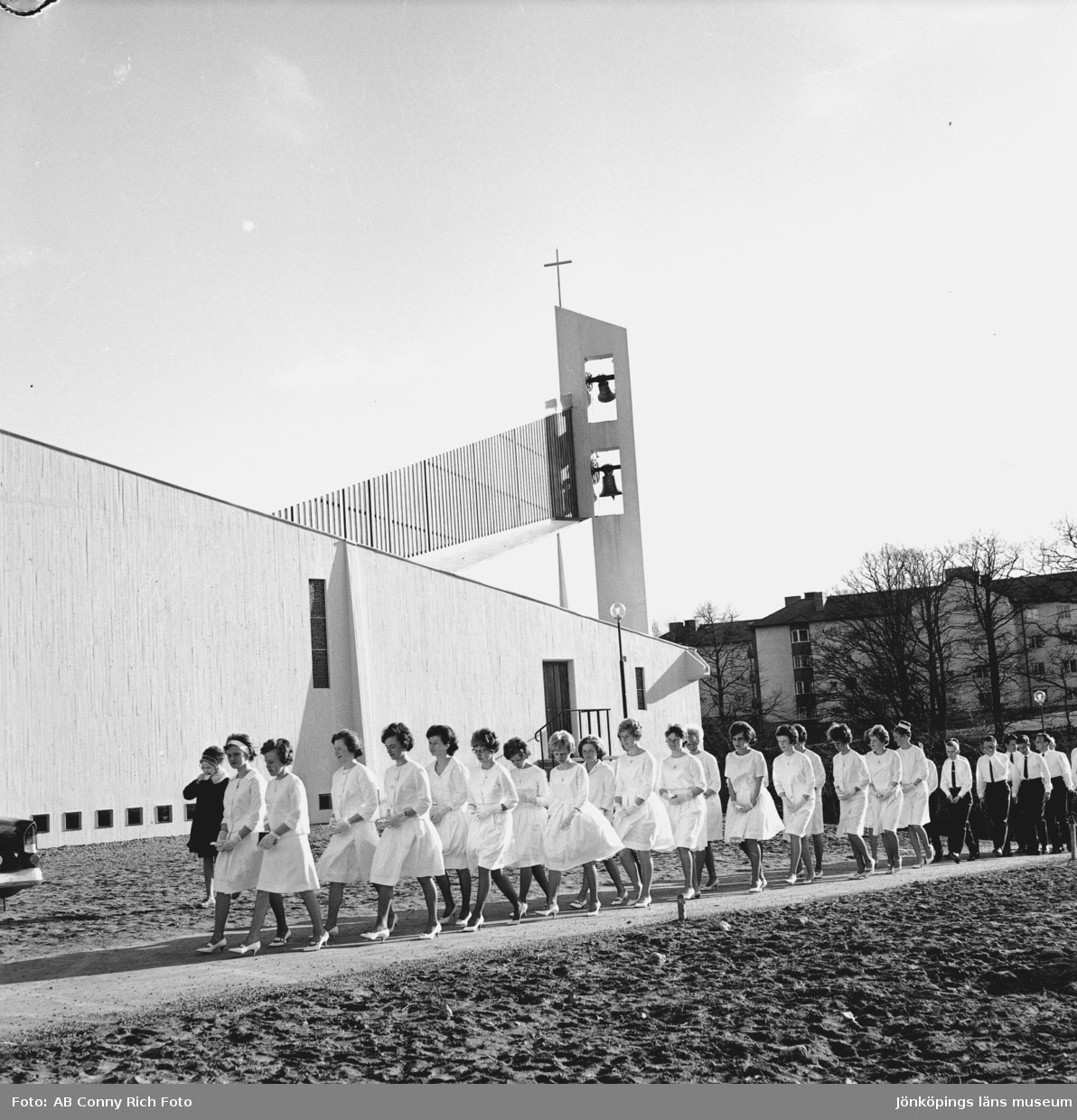
- Confirmands outside the Österängen Church by the mid 1960's
- Österängen Church
- Location: Österängen
- Country: Sweden
- Denomination: Church of Sweden

History
- Consecrated: 3 December 1961

Administration
- Diocese: Växjö
- Parish: Christina-Ljungarum

Österängen Church (Swedish: Österängskyrkan) is a church building at Österängen in Jönköping in Sweden. Belonging to the Christina-Ljungarum Parish of the Church of Sweden, it was inaugurated on First Advent Sunday 1961.
