= City Architect =

City Architect is a public official responsible for planning and shaping the physical layout and design of a city. City architect manages building permits, approvals, detailed plans, infrastructure development and other matters relating to construction in the city. This profession has existed for hundreds of years, – Stockholm's first city architect was appointed in 1661. In earlier times, the role of city architect often also included the responsibility of designing public buildings.

== Sweden ==
Stadsarkitekt is the Swedish name for city architect, but various other names have been used historically, e.g. stadsbyggmästare (city's master builder) and stadsingenjör (city's engineer). Sweden's first city architect was Nicodemus Tessin the Elder in Stockholm, appointed in 1661. Sweden's second city architect was appointed in Gothenburg in 1717. By 1900s, most Swedish cities had a city architect, but qualifications, education background and job descriptions varied a lot. In an attempt to standardize and improve the profession, August Atterström founded the Association of Swedish City Architects (Föreningen Sveriges Stadsarkitekter, FSS) in 1924.

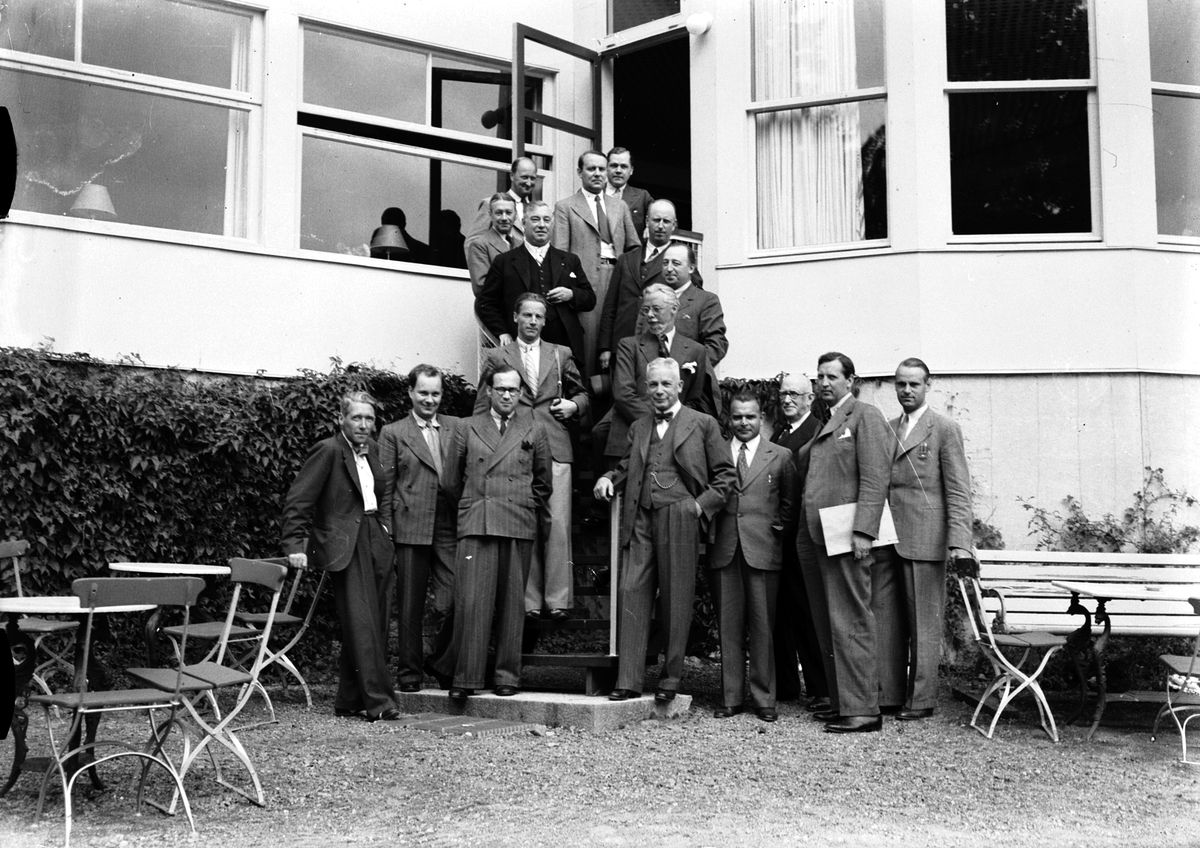
Sweden's city architects in Aug 1939

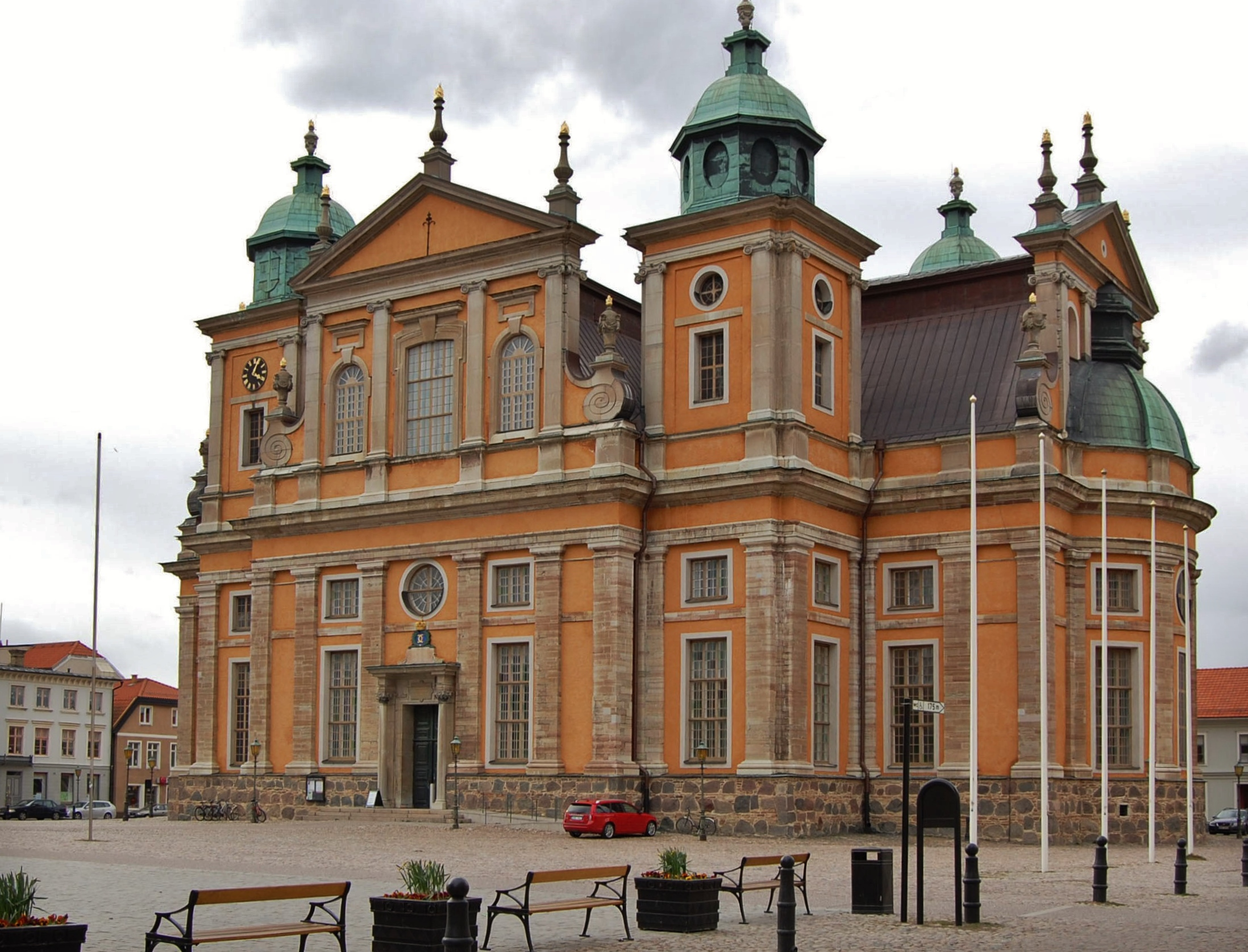
Kalmar Cathedral was designed by Nicodemus Tessin the Elder who later became Sweden's first city architect in Stockholm

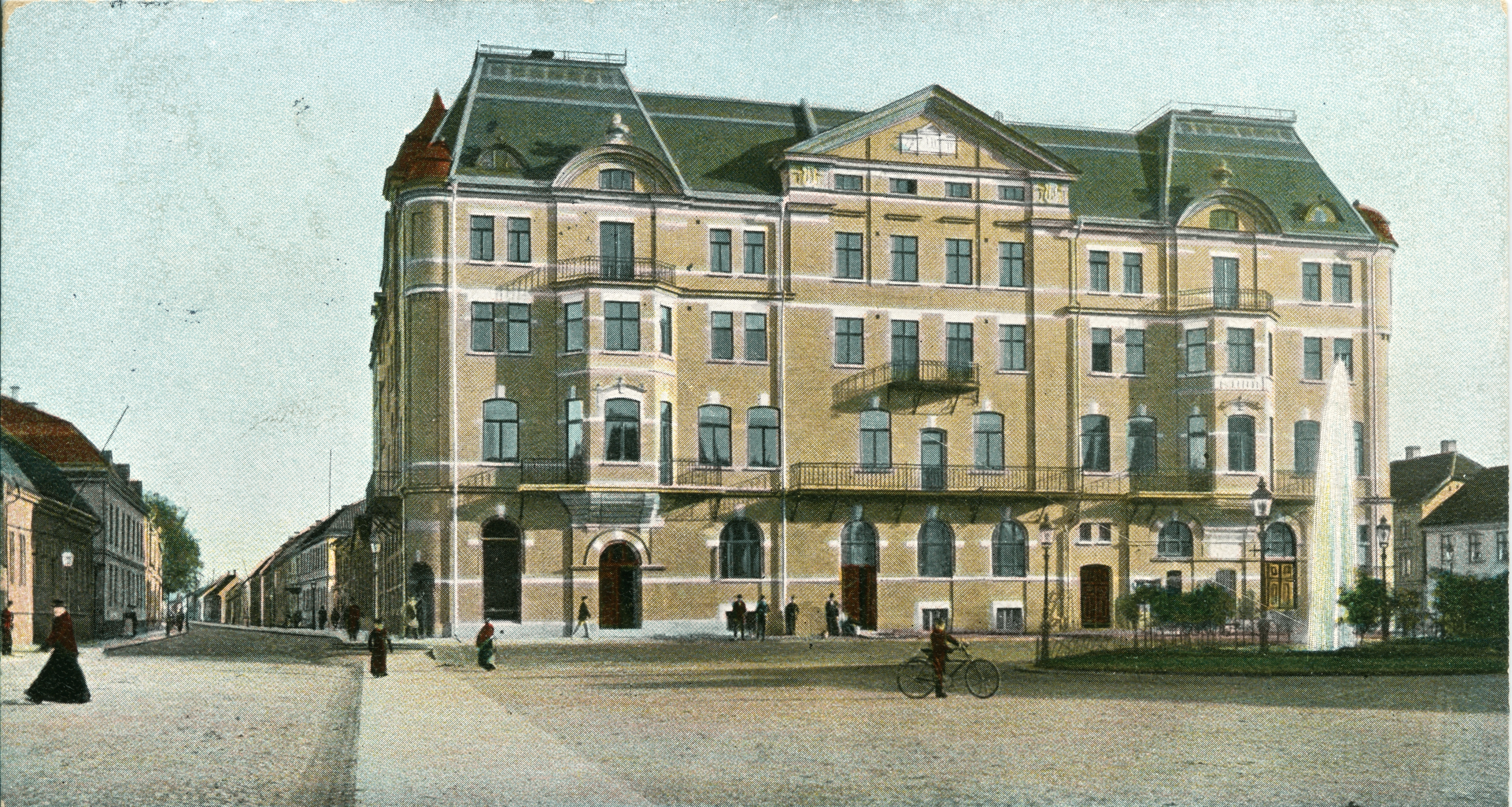
Jönköping's Grand Hotel was designed by Jönköping's city architect August Atterström

== UK ==
It is a form of council architect in the United Kingdom.

- Bath City Architect
- City Architect of Birmingham
