= Råslätt Church =

Coordinates: 57.7394°N 14.1505°E

- Råslätts kyrka
- Råslätt Church
- Location: Råslätt
- Country: Sweden
- Denomination: Church of Sweden

History
- Consecrated: 1975

Administration
- Diocese: Växjö
- Parish: Kristina-Ljungarum

Råslätt Church (Swedish: Råslätts kyrka) is a church building at Råslätt in Jönköping in Sweden. Belonging to the Kristina-Ljungarum of the Church of Sweden, it is dated back to the 1970s, and the architect was Per Rudenstam.
