= Kungsporten Church =

Coordinates: 57.7825°N 14.2600°E

- Kungsportskyrkan
- Kungsporten Church
- Location: Öxnehaga
- Country: Sweden
- Denomination: Evangelical Free Church in Sweden

History
- Consecrated: November 2001

Administration
- Parish: Huskvarna

The Kungsporten Church (Swedish: Kungsportskyrkan) is a church building in Öxnehaga in Huskvarna, Sweden. Belonging to the Evangelical Free Church in Sweden, the building was opened in November 2001.

The congregation itself was founded in Huskvarna in 1956 under the name Smyrnaförsamlingen, with about twenty members. In 1999 the congregation, which then had about 200 members, purchased a former iron factory, and changed its name to Kungsportskyrkan.
