= The Motorhomes =

Swedish rock band

The Motorhomes was a Swedish rock band from Jönköping that was created in 1997. They released two albums: Songs For Me (And My Baby) (1999) and The Long Distance Runner (2002).

Their biggest hit was “Into the Night” from the first album. This song was played very frequently on Swedish radio stations. The Motorhomes got to feature as the warmup band for Suede (band) on their Scandinavian tour. They also played famous festivals in England such as the Reading Festival.

The band split up in 2004 after the singer Mattias Edlund decided to quit for personal reasons.

== Members ==
- Mattias Edlund - vocals (1997-2004)
- Adam Starck - guitar (1997-2004)
- Peder Claesson - drums (1997-2002)
- Petur Mogensen - bass (1997-2004)
- Daniel Skaar - guitar (1997-2000)
- Niklas Korssell - drums (2002-2004)
- Henrik Carlsson - keyboards (2002-2004)

== Discography ==
=== Albums ===
- Songs For Me (And My Baby) (1999)
- The Long Distance Runner (2002)

=== Singles ===
- "It's Alright" (1999)
- "Into The Night" (1999)
- "For Whom It May Concern" (2000)
- "For Tomorrow" (2000)
- "The Man" (2001)
- "I Wanna Make You Sing" (2002)
