= Match Museum =

Museum about matches in Jönköping, Sweden

Coordinates: 57°47′05″N 14°09′35″E

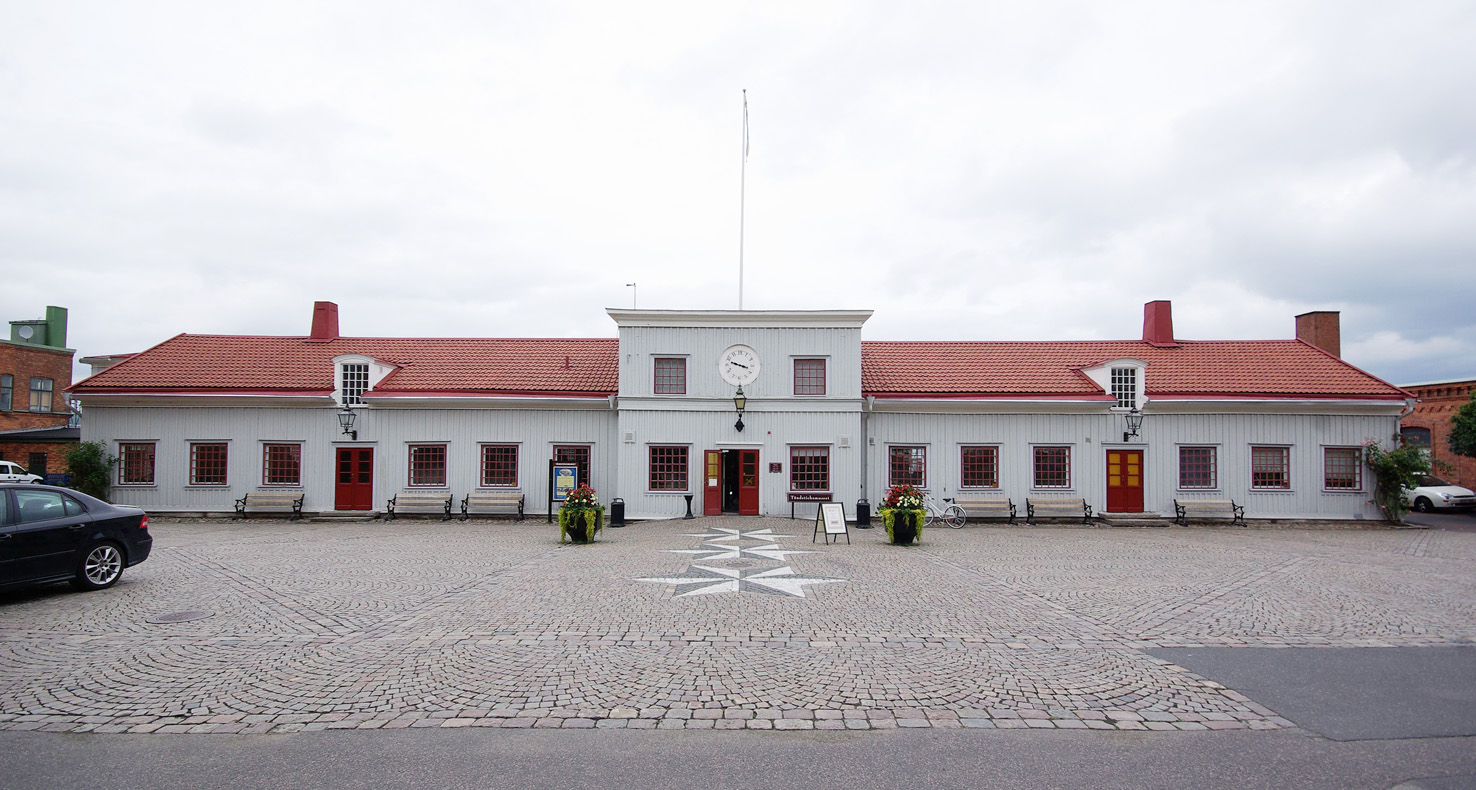
The former match factory housing the Match Museum

The Match Museum (Swedish: Tändsticksmuseet) in Jönköping, Sweden is one of the few museums of matches in the world. It is located at the Tändsticksområdet, housed in Jönköping's first match factory. The museum highlights the people that worked in the factory and how the factory functioned.
