= Huskvarna =

Municipality of Jönköping, Sweden

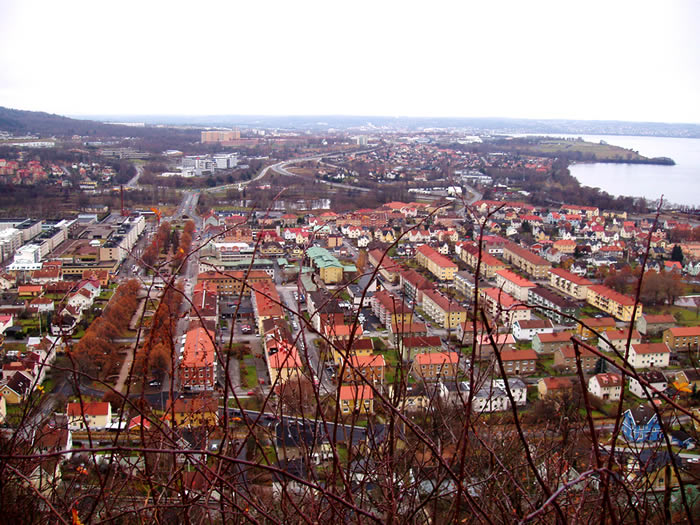
- View over Huskvarna

- Coat of arms

- Location within Sweden Location within Jönköping
- Coordinates: 57°48′N 14°16′E
- Country: Sweden
- Municipality: Jönköping Municipality
- County: Jönköping County
- Province: Småland

Population
  - Total: 24,058
- Time zone: UTC+1 (CET)
  - Summer (DST): UTC+2 (CEST)

Huskvarna (Swedish pronunciation: [ˈhʉ̂ːsˌkvɑːɳa]; formerly spelled Husqvarna) constitutes the eastern part of Jönköping, a city in the Swedish province of Småland, and has a population of about 24,000. The distance to central Jönköping is about 5 km. The name Huskvarna translates to "house mill".

Between 1911 and 1970, it was a city municipality of its own. It geographically grew together with Jönköping in the 1950s. Since the local government reform in 1971, it is administratively within Jönköping Municipality.

== History ==
A royal rifle manufacturer was established in Husqvarna, as it was originally spelled, in 1689, and lasted until 1757, when it was sold to private owners. It continued to supply the Swedish and Norwegian armies with rifles (for example, in 1870, some 10,000 rifles were finished), but the company later switched to the production of sewing machines and bicycles. Today, it is known as Husqvarna AB, a multinational company with a focus on gardening and outdoor tools.

== Coat of arms ==
The arms (1911) depict rifles and their ignition.

== Sport ==
The International Floorball Federation was founded in Huskvarna in 1986.

== Notable residents ==
- Mona Johannesson, model
- Denni Avdić, association football player
- Emma Sjöberg, model
- Karin Alvtegen, author
- Gustaf Ankarcrona, painter
- Björn Afzelius, singer-songwriter
