= Mona Johannesson =

Swedish model (born 1987)

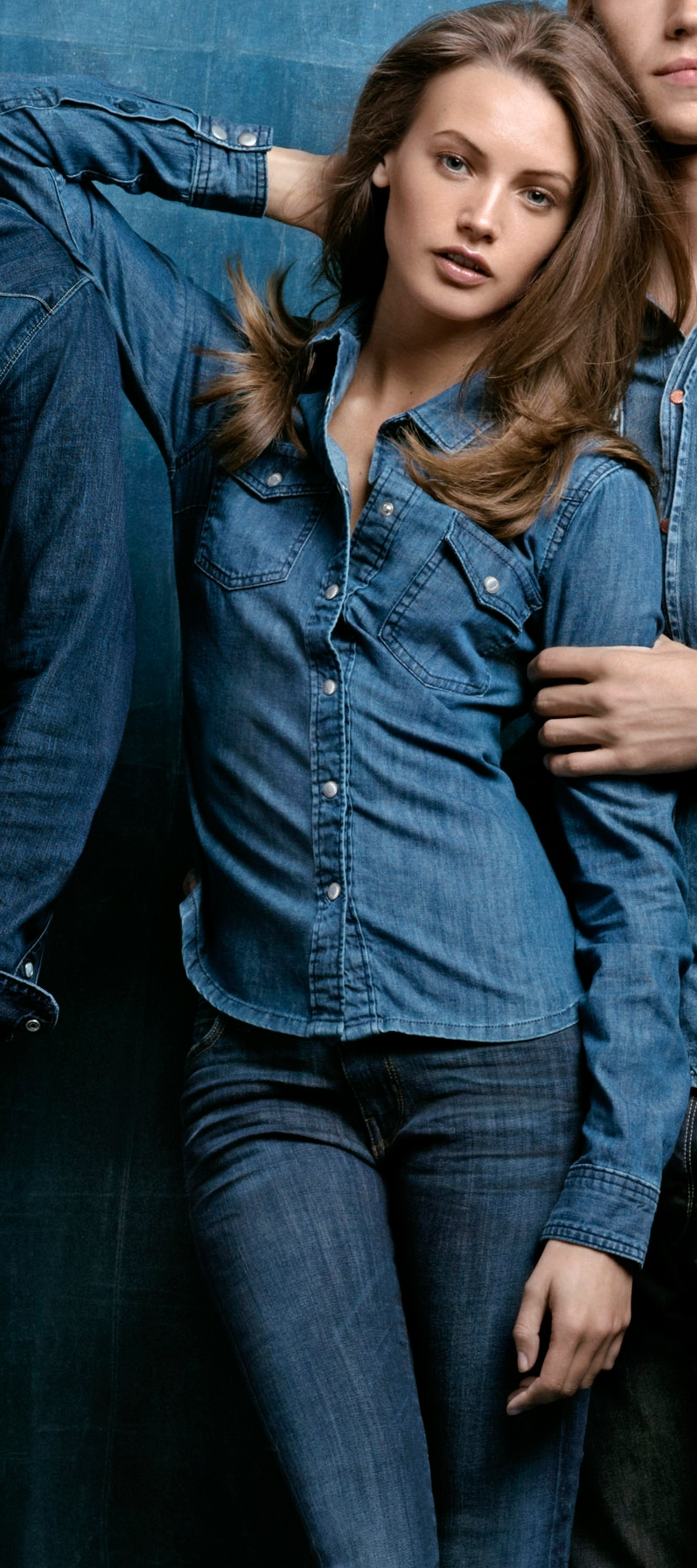
- Johannesson in 2011
- Born: September 18, 1987 (age 39); Huskvarna, Sweden
- Modeling information
- Height: 5 ft 8 in (1.73 m)
- Hair color: Dark blonde
- Eye color: Blue
- Agency: Next Model Management (New York, Paris, Milan, London); Model Management (Hamburg); MIKAs (Stockholm); Elite Model Management (Toronto)

Mona Johannesson (born September 18, 1987) is a Swedish model. In Sweden, she is considered to be one of the top models in the country.

Johannesson was discovered at the age of 14 by an IMG Models scout while she was at a horse trials event in Gothenburg, Sweden. She modeled only part-time until she finished school. Once she finished her education, she moved to London. Her big break came when an editorial in Fjords magazine re-created some of model Kate Moss's most famous poses, and Johannesson was quickly dubbed "The Next Kate Moss", including by Vogue. The nickname "Baby Kate" has stuck with her ever since. By January 2005, she had already appeared in British Vogue, Pop, Italian Vanity Fair and Italian Vogue.

Johannesson has walked in numerous fashion shows including Chanel, Dolce & Gabbana, Nina Ricci, Miu Miu and Burberry. Her list of advertising campaigns includes Armani Exchange, Boucheron Jewelry, Bulgari, Burberry Blue, Cacharel, Costume National, Filippa K, Hogan, Hugo by Hugo Boss, H&M Divided, iBlues, J.Crew, Kurt Geiger, Le Printemps, Nina Ricci, Tse Cashmere, Ungaro Fuchsia and Valentino RED.
