= Jönköping =

Place in Småland, Sweden

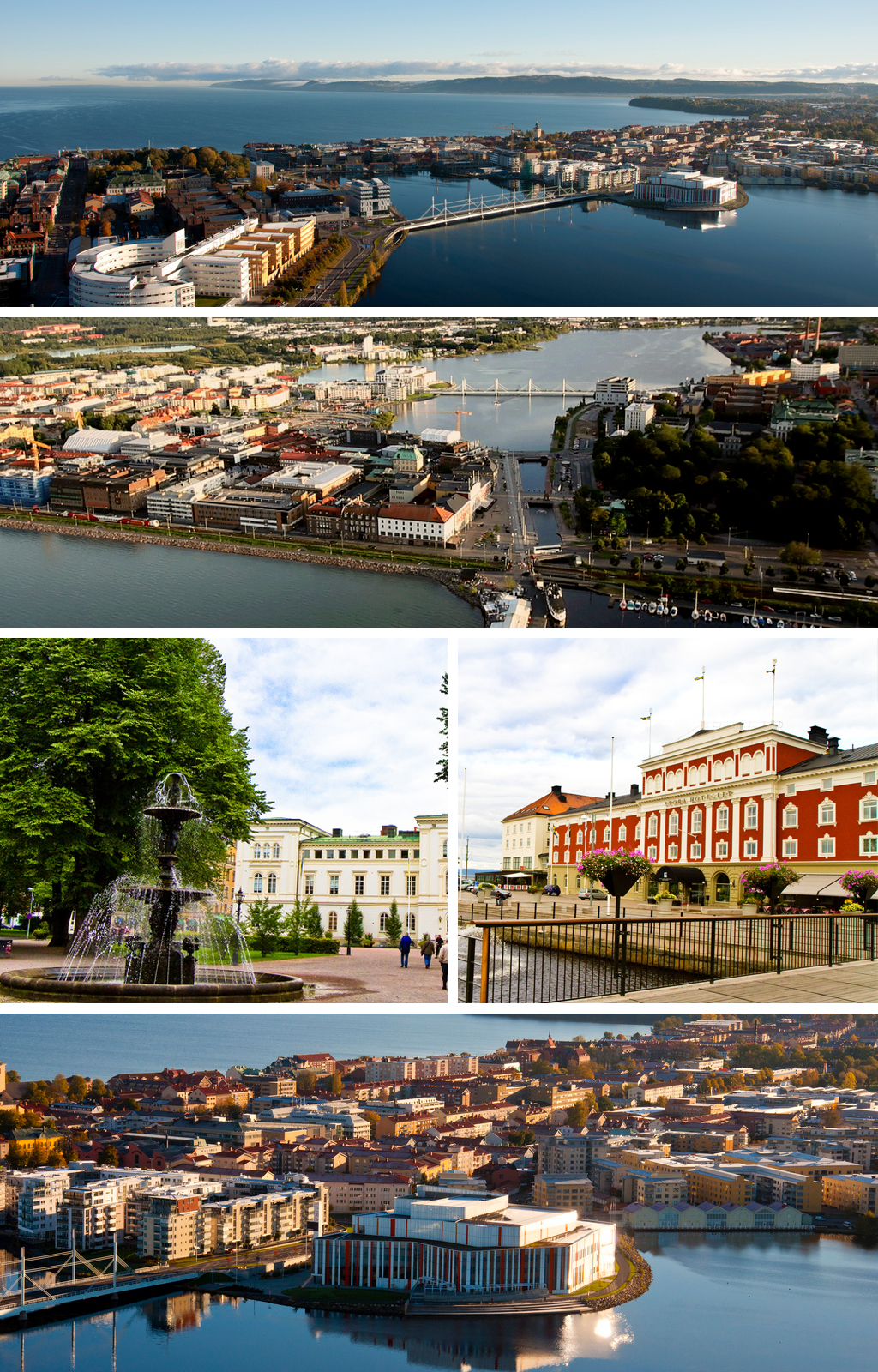
- Collage of Jönköping

- Flag Coat of arms

- Location within Jönköping Location within Sweden
- Coordinates: 57°46′58″N 14°09′38″E
- Country: Sweden
- Province: Småland
- County: Jönköping County
- Municipality: Jönköping Municipality
- City status: 1284

Area
  - City: 44.82 km^{2} (17.31 sq mi)
- Elevation: 104 m (341 ft)

Population (31 May 2022)
  - City: 112,766
  - Density: 2,516/km^{2} (6,516/sq mi)
  - Metro: 144,699
- Time zone: UTC+1 (CET)
  - Summer (DST): UTC+2 (CEST)
- Postal code: 555 xx
- Area code: (+46) 36
- Vehicle registration: 1544
- Climate: Dfb
- Website: www.jonkoping.se

Jönköping (/ˈjɜːn(t)ʃɜːpɪŋ/, Swedish: [ˈjœ̂nːˌɕøːpɪŋ]) is a city in southern Sweden with 112,766 inhabitants (2022). Jönköping is situated on the southern shore of Sweden's second largest lake, Vättern, in the province of Småland.

The city is the seat of Jönköping Municipality, which has a population of 144,699 (2022) and is Småland's most populous municipality. Jönköping is also the seat of Jönköping County which has a population of 367,064 (2022). Jönköping is the seat of a district court and a court of appeal as well as the Swedish National Courts Administration. It is also the seat of the Swedish Board of Agriculture.

== City government ==
The headquarters of the Jönköping municipality are located in a city hall (rådhuset). The Rådhuset is an important component of the municipality, serving as a state office for different departments of and in Jönköping. It is dependent on the municipality, but is also its own entity and therefore its head is not the head of the entire municipality. The head of Jönköping is the kommunfullmäktige.

== History ==
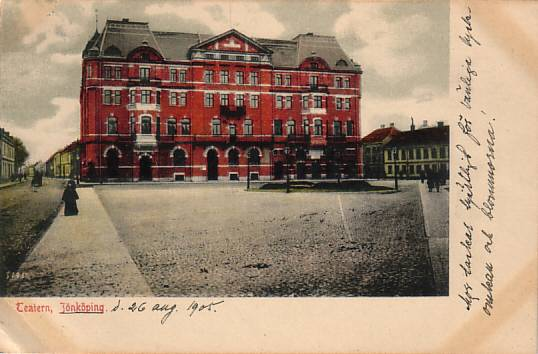
Jönköping Grand Hotel, one of city's oldest hotels, on a postcard from 1905

Jönköping is an old trading centre (Köping) situated at a natural crossroads for routes following the rivers Nissan and Lagan, and the road connecting the provinces of Östergötland and Västergötland, a result of the town's geographical position at the southern end of lake Vättern, which divides the two provinces.

On 18 May 1284 Jönköping became the first City in Sweden to be granted its rights by king Magnus Ladulås, who ruled mostly from Vättern's largest island Visingsö. The first part of the city's name, "Jön", is derived from a creek, "Junebäcken", in Talavid, in what is now the western part of the city. The second part of the name "köping", is, as mentioned above, an old word for a trading centre or market place.

The geographical position of the city also left it vulnerable to attack via the river routes that led south, mainly from Danes. At that time the provinces of what is today southern Sweden – Scania, Halland and Blekinge – belonged to Denmark. The city was plundered and burned several times until it was fortified during the 16th and 17th centuries.

Jönköping was known for its matchstick industry between 1845 and 1970. The phosphorus match was invented in 1831, and these matches became very popular because one could strike it against any surface to ignite it. However, the problem was that they ignited too easily, caused a lot of accidents and were toxic. In 1844, Swedish professor Gustav Erik Pasch patented a new invention, "Safety matches – Strike against the box only". To prevent the matches from igniting so easily, Gustav Erik Pasch separated the chemicals in the match head and placed the phosphorus on a separate surface on the outside of the box for striking ignition. Johan Edvard and Carl Frans Lundström took Pasch's patent and improved it. Later, they manufactured their new Safety matches in their factory in Jönköping. Today, the Match Museum is located in Jönköping's first match factory.

== Present ==
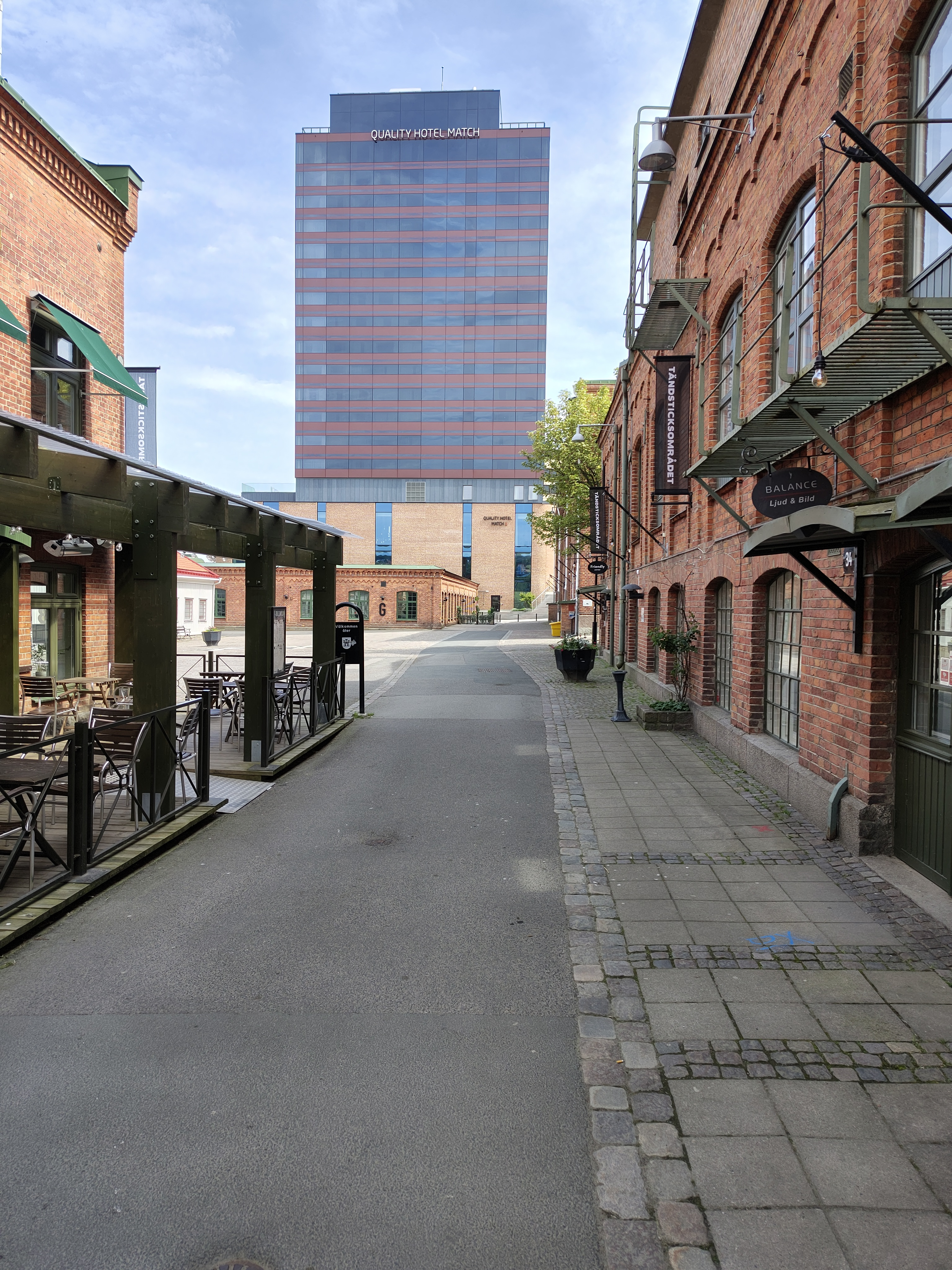
Tändsticksmrådet, a historic area with Jönköping's tallest building in the background

The urban area of Jönköping today includes the eastern industrial town of Huskvarna, with which it has grown together.

Elmia, a major trade fair and exhibition centre, is situated in Jönköping. Elmia Wood is the world's largest forestry fair, and fairs for subcontractors, trucks, caravans and railways are the biggest of their kind in Europe. From 2001 to 2023, Elmia was the site of the world's largest LAN party, DreamHack, with two events every year, Dreamhack Summer and Dreamhack Winter, until the convention was moved to Stockholm.

The city is an important Nordic logistical center, with many companies' central warehouses (such as Elgiganten, IKEA, Electrolux and Husqvarna) situated there. Jönköping has one of the highest hotel and restaurant densities in Sweden.

In late 2019, Jönköping was seen as the city with best future prospects in Sweden by WSP.

== Demography ==
=== Population ===
As of 2018, Jönköping has a total population of 139,222.

Gender	2014	2015	2016	2017	2018	2019
Female	66,404	66,987	67,823	68,722	69,426	70,265
Male	65,736	66,323	67,474	68,759	69,796	70,816
Total	132,140	133,310	135,297	137,481	139,222	141,081

=== Population changes ===
	2014	2015	2016	2017	2018	2019
Population increase	1,342	1,170	1,987	2,184	1,741	1,859
Born	1,677	1,662	1,715	1,615	1,688	1,644
Deceased	1,169	1,217	1,101	1,202	1,253	1,100

=== Average age 2019 ===
Area	Female	Male	Female and Male
Jönköping	41.3	39.2	40.3

== Notable people ==
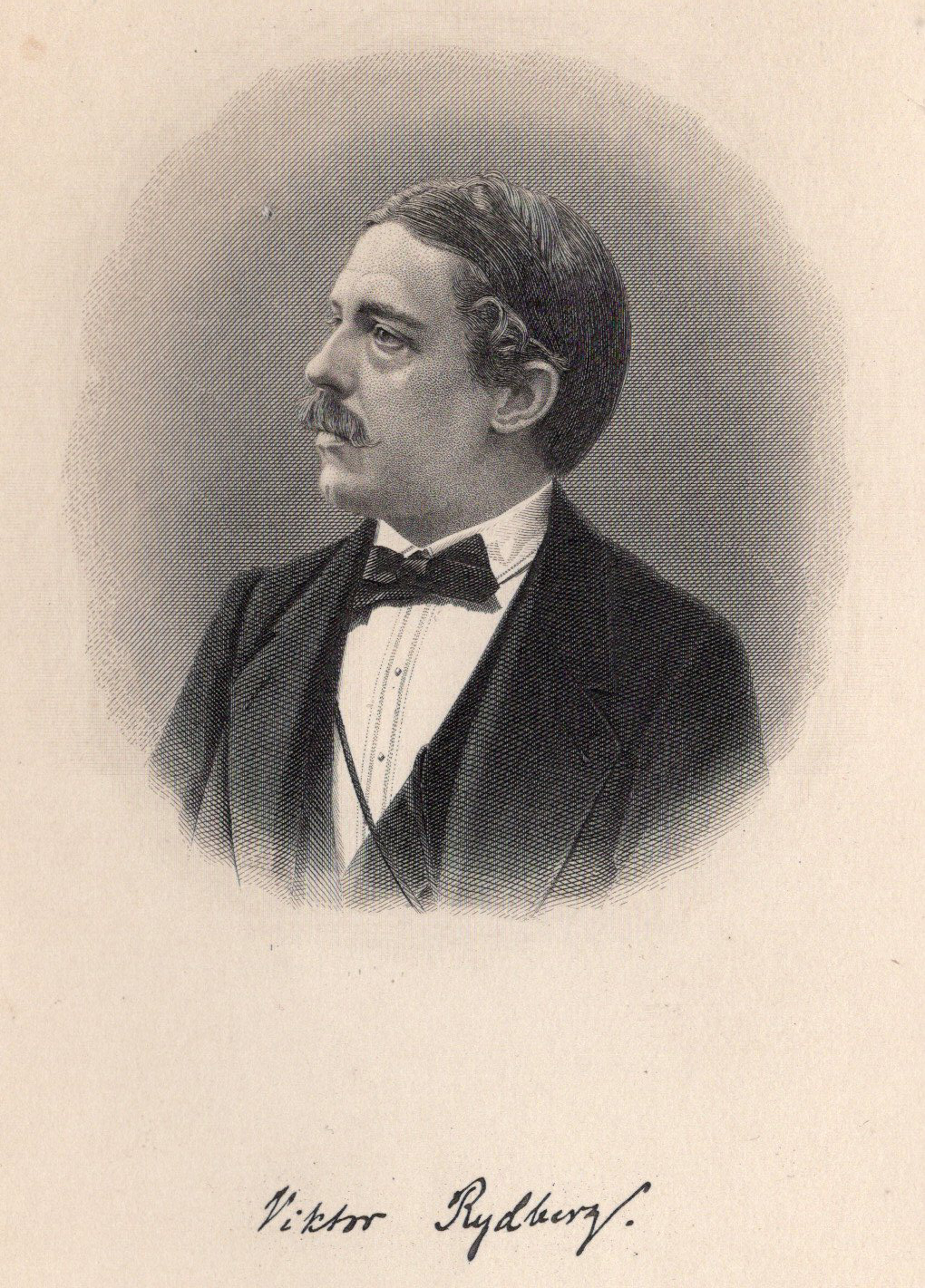
Viktor Rydberg, 1877

- Johan Björnsson Printz (1592–1663), governor of the Swedish colony of New Sweden
- Carl Peter Thunberg (1743–1828), botanist
- Aurore Storckenfeldt (1816–1900), educator
- Swante M. Swenson (1816–1896), founder of the SMS ranches in Texas
- Viktor Rydberg (1828–1895), author
- Carl Lotave (1872–1924), artist, portrait painter
- John Bauer (1882–1918), illustrator, painter
- Bernhard Karlgren (1889–1978), sinologist and linguist
- Dag Hammarskjöld (1905–1961), former United Nations Secretary-General
- Martin Allwood (1916–1999), educator, writer, sociologist, translator, professor
- Per G. Malm (1948–2016), leader in The Church of Jesus Christ of Latter-day Saints
- Carl Henrik Fredriksson (born 1965), editor-in-chief and co-founder of Eurozine
- Vladimir Oravsky (born 1947), author and film director
- Kenneth Breslauer (born 1947), chemist and chemical biologist
- Jacob Karlzon (born 1970)
- Fredrik Neij (born 1978), founder of The Pirate Bay BitTorrent-tracker
- David F. Sandberg (born 1981), film director
- Mona Johannesson (born 1987), model

=== Music ===
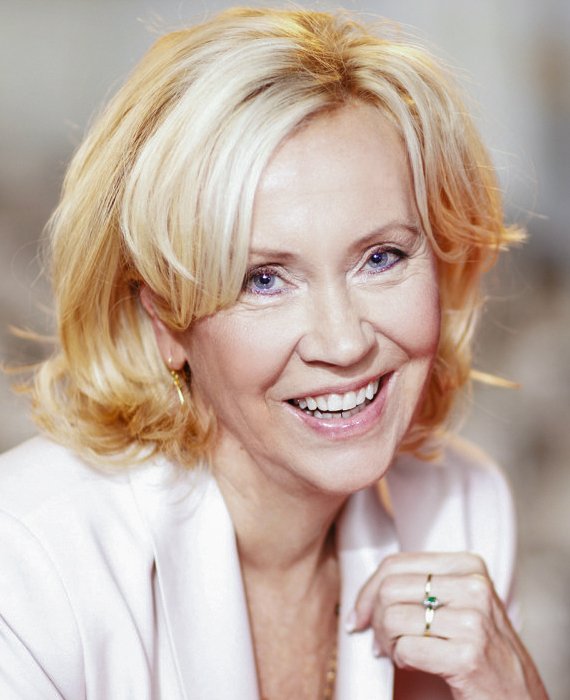
Agnetha Fältskog, 2013

- Agnetha Fältskog (born 1950), singer/songwriter and member of ABBA
- Nina Persson (born 1974), vocalist with The Cardigans
- Amy Diamond (born 1992), singer
- The Motorhomes (formed in 1997), rock band
- The Mary Onettes (formed in 2000), indie rock band
- I'm from Barcelona (formed in 2005), 29-piece indie pop band
- Aril Brikha (born 1976), techno musician
- Nadia Tehran (born 1990), rapper and singer
- Olle Widestrand (1932–2018), pianist–composer
- Joakim "Jolly" Karlsson (born 1988), member of Bad Omens and former member of Her Bright Skies

=== Sport ===
- Gunhild Larking (born 1936), high jumper
- Göran Kropp (1966–2002), mountaineer
- Anders Gustafsson (born 1979), Olympic kayaker
- Sofia Paldanius (born 1979), Olympic kayaker
- Stefan Liv (1980–2011), Olympic ice hockey goaltender
- Enzo Hallman (born 2007), racing driver
- Jakob Leander (born 2007), Hockey Player

== Education ==
=== High schools ===
- Bäckadalsgymnasiet
- Erik Dahlbergsgymnasiet
- Per Brahegymnasiet
- Sandagymnasiet
- Thoren Business School
- LBS: High School of Creativity

=== Tertiary education ===
- Jönköping University Foundation
- Södra Vätterbygdens Folkhögskola
- The Institute for Postgraduate Dental Education

== Climate ==
Between 1961 and 1990, Jönköping's climate was humid continental (Köppen Dfb) with long, cold winters and short, warm summers. However, the window between subarctic and oceanic is very small in this marine-influenced climate type, and in recent years the climate has more resembled very cold oceanic. Figures are slightly skewed because the weather station is at the airport, which is at an elevation of 228 metres (748 ft); the city centre is at 100 metres (330 ft). Temperatures in the urban centre are likely milder, with a difference between half a degree and a full degree.

Climate data for Jönköping Airport 2002–2018; extremes since 1901
Month	Jan	Feb	Mar	Apr	May	Jun	Jul	Aug	Sep	Oct	Nov	Dec	Year
Record high °C (°F)	11.8 (53.2)	16.1 (61.0)	21.1 (70.0)	28.0 (82.4)	31.3 (88.3)	34.5 (94.1)	36.7 (98.1)	34.2 (93.6)	29.5 (85.1)	22.4 (72.3)	17.0 (62.6)	12.7 (54.9)	36.7 (98.1)
Mean maximum °C (°F)	8.7 (47.7)	10.8 (51.4)	15.3 (59.5)	21.3 (70.3)	25.9 (78.6)	30.3 (86.5)	31.1 (88.0)	29.6 (85.3)	24.2 (75.6)	18.8 (65.8)	14.0 (57.2)	9.4 (48.9)	32.2 (90.0)
Mean daily maximum °C (°F)	1.7 (35.1)	2.9 (37.2)	7.0 (44.6)	11.8 (53.2)	17.3 (63.1)	21.1 (70.0)	23.3 (73.9)	22.5 (72.5)	18.2 (64.8)	12.9 (55.2)	7.6 (45.7)	4.0 (39.2)	12.5 (54.5)
Daily mean °C (°F)	−0.5 (31.1)	−0.2 (31.6)	2.9 (37.2)	5.8 (42.4)	11.5 (52.7)	16.0 (60.8)	17.9 (64.2)	17.1 (62.8)	13.4 (56.1)	9.3 (48.7)	4.8 (40.6)	2.2 (36.0)	8.4 (47.0)
Mean daily minimum °C (°F)	−2.6 (27.3)	−3.3 (26.1)	−1.3 (29.7)	1.7 (35.1)	6.3 (43.3)	11.1 (52.0)	13.2 (55.8)	12.9 (55.2)	9.4 (48.9)	6.0 (42.8)	2.5 (36.5)	0.0 (32.0)	4.7 (40.4)
Mean minimum °C (°F)	−10.7 (12.7)	−12.2 (10.0)	−8.0 (17.6)	−5.1 (22.8)	−0.1 (31.8)	4.8 (40.6)	7.7 (45.9)	7.3 (45.1)	3.2 (37.8)	−2.2 (28.0)	−6.4 (20.5)	−8.9 (16.0)	−14.6 (5.7)
Record low °C (°F)	−31.8 (−25.2)	−34.2 (−29.6)	−29.1 (−20.4)	−16.9 (1.6)	−5.8 (21.6)	−3.2 (26.2)	1.7 (35.1)	0.6 (33.1)	−5.3 (22.5)	−11.6 (11.1)	−19.5 (−3.1)	−25.8 (−14.4)	−34.2 (−29.6)
Average precipitation mm (inches)	43.2 (1.70)	29.5 (1.16)	20.4 (0.80)	27.7 (1.09)	38.4 (1.51)	52.9 (2.08)	77.5 (3.05)	70.6 (2.78)	73.1 (2.88)	58.0 (2.28)	56.2 (2.21)	53.8 (2.12)	601.3 (23.66)
Source 1: SMHI Average Data 2002–2018
Source 2: SMHI Open Data

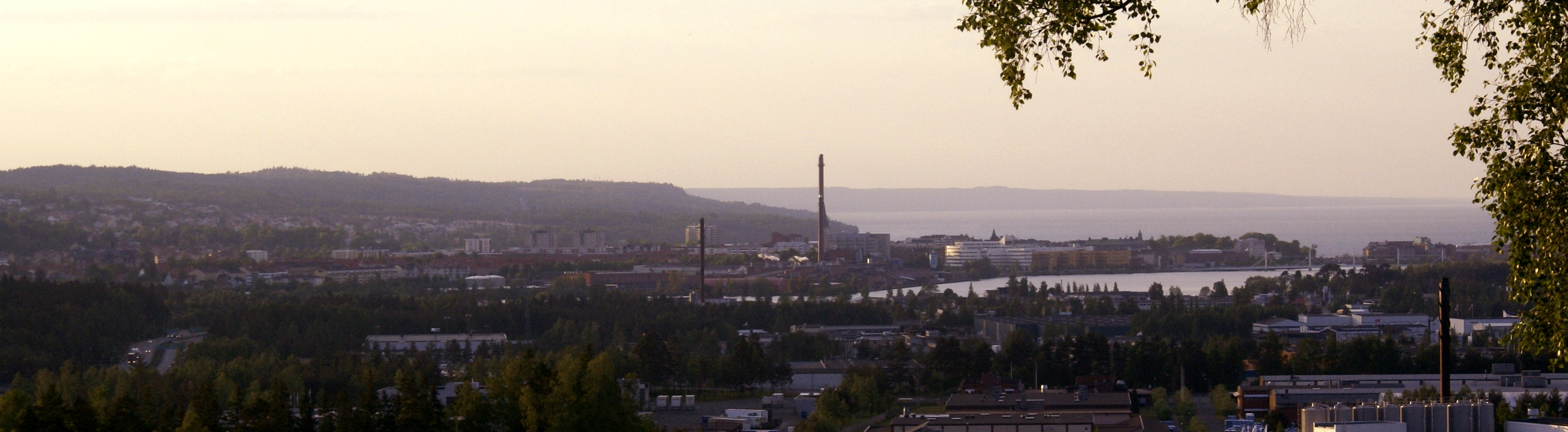
Panorama of central Jönköping

== Sport ==
- HV71, men's ice hockey team currently playing in the SHL.
- HV71 Dam, women's ice hockey team in the SDHL
- Jönköpings IK (JIK), floorball team who has played several season in the men's Swedish Super League.
- Jönköpings Södra IF, football (soccer) team in Superettan (second-tier league of Sweden).
- Husqvarna FF, football (soccer) team in Division 1 (third-tier league of Sweden).
- IK Tord, football (soccer) team in Division 2 Västra Götaland (fourth tier league of Sweden).
- Jönköping Bandy IF, bandy team in Allsvenskan (second-tier league of Sweden).
- Jönköpings SS, swimming society, with Swedish champions in both swimming and diving. There are also three other water disciplines in the club, lifeguarding and synchronized swimming.
- ATP Challenger Tour event, starting in 2016.
- Jönköping hosted the 1984 World Rowing Junior Championships and the 2019 European Universities Rowing Championships.
- Jönköping hosted the 2011 League of Legends World Championship.

== Churches ==
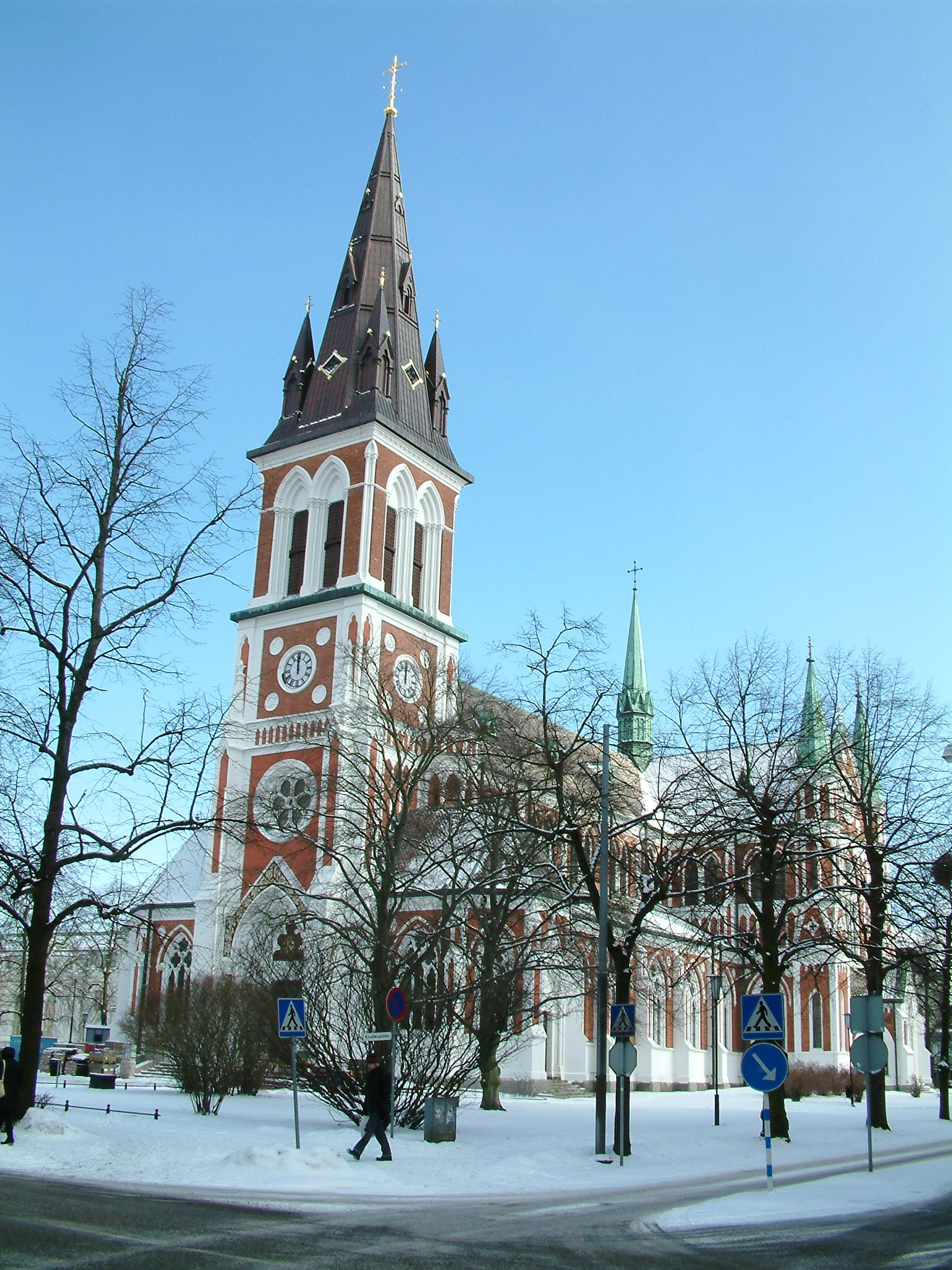
Sofia Church

- Sofia Church
- Eastern Chapel
- Ekhagen Church
- Österängen Church
- Råslätt Church
- Kungsporten Church

== See also ==
- Jönköping Municipality
- Swedish National Board of Agriculture
- International Ice Hockey Federation World Championships (2002, held in Jönköping)
- Tranhult
