= Per Brahe Secondary School =

Historic secondary school in Jönköping, Sweden

Coordinates: 57.7811°N 14.1656°E

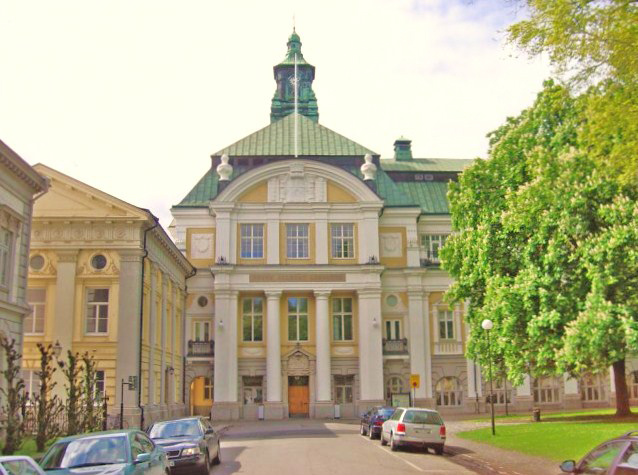
- Per Brahe Secondary School
- Jönköping; Sweden

Information
- Type: secondary school

The Per Brahe Secondary School (Swedish: Per Brahegymnasiet) is a secondary school in Jönköping, Sweden with traditions back to the 17th century. The current building was opened on 18 October 1913.

Since 2007, the school has UN certification.
