= Gerda Tirén =

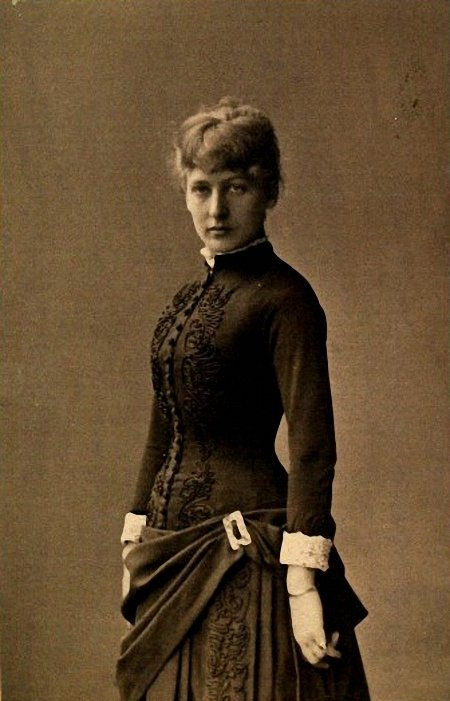
Gerda Tirén (1880)

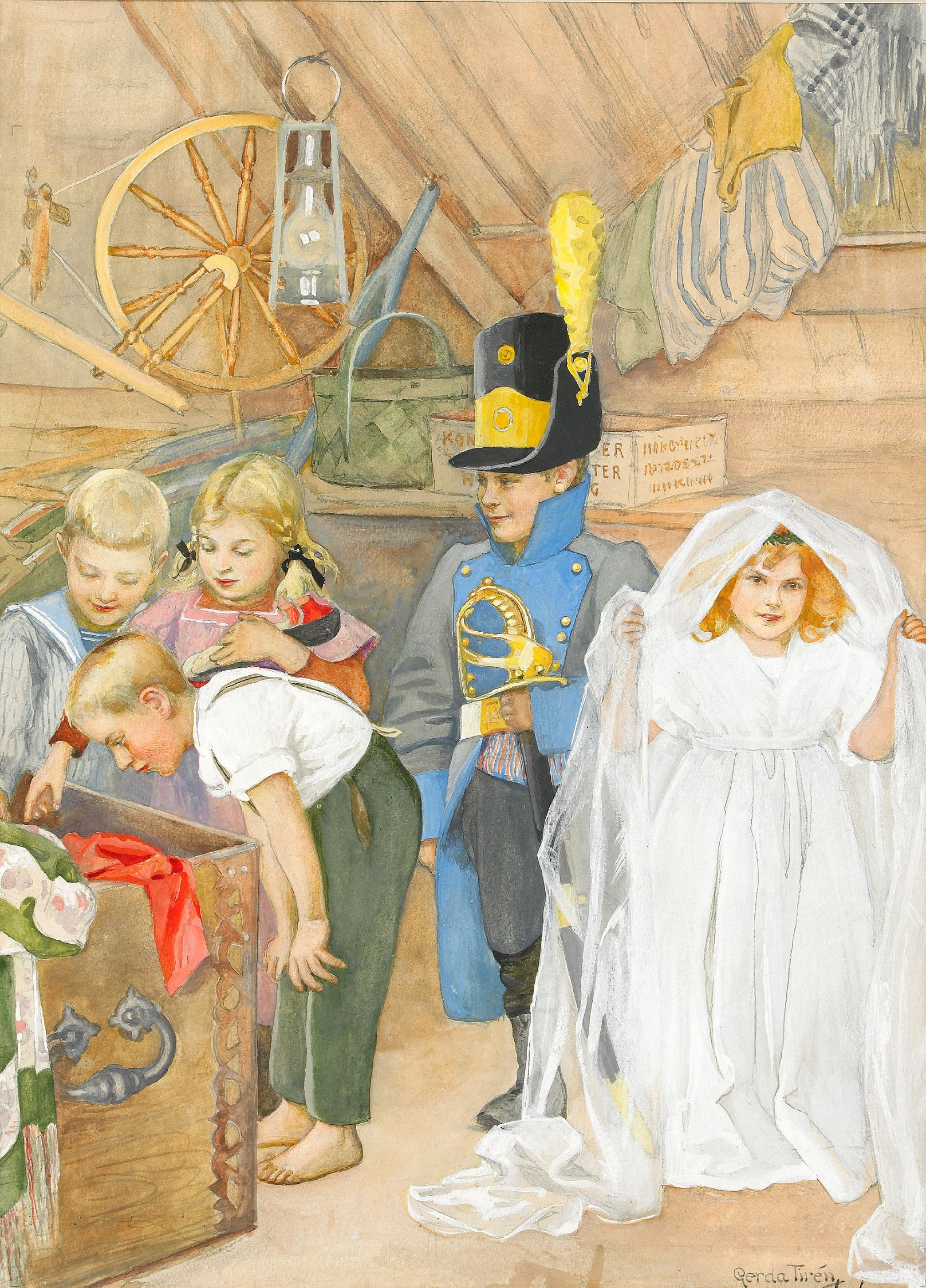
Bridal Party

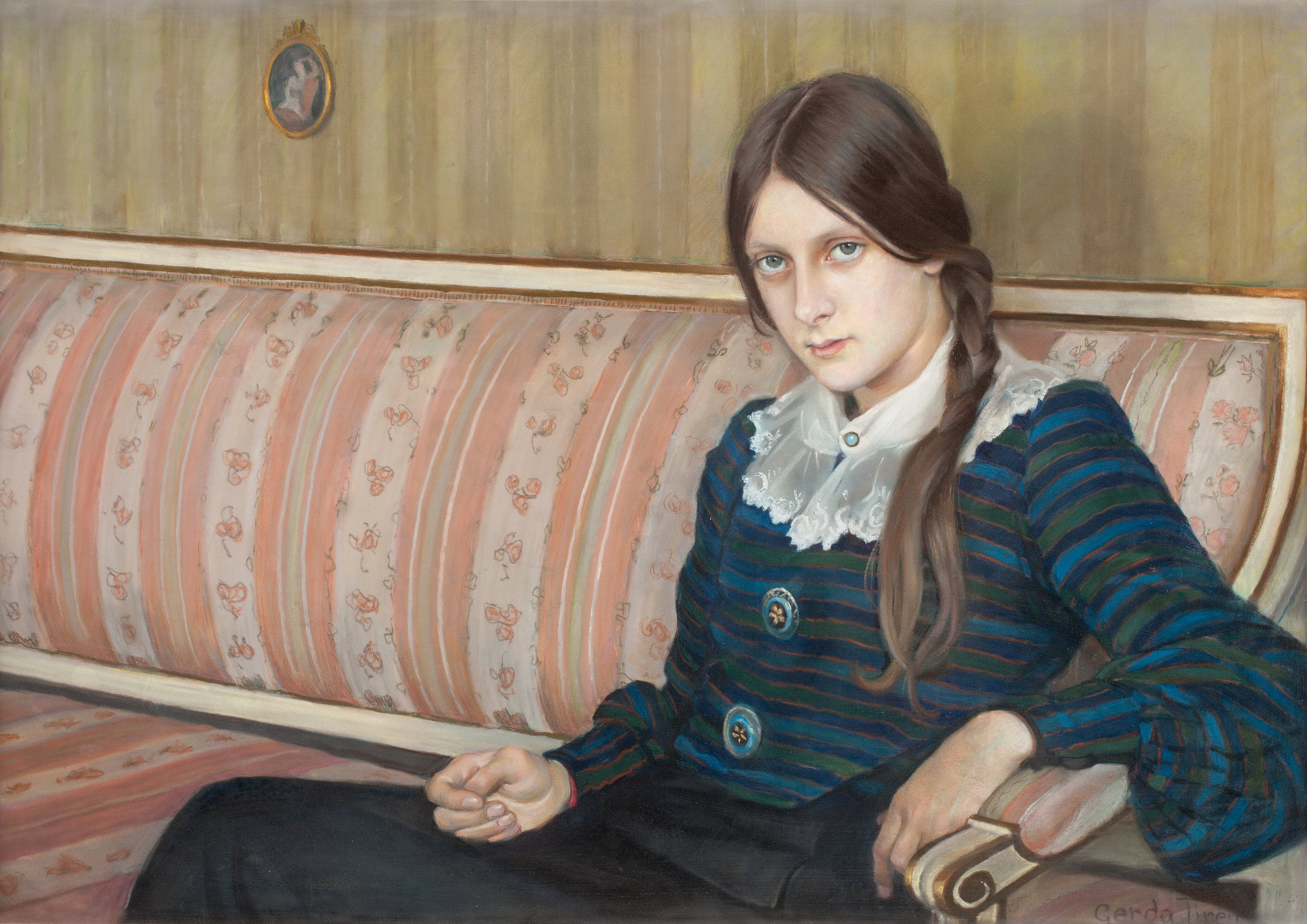
On the Sofa

Gerda Maria Tirén, née Rydberg (11 January 1858, Stockholm – 9 October 1928, Länna Parish, Uppland) was a Swedish painter and illustrator. She did landscapes from France and Sweden, children's portraits, and genre scenes. Her illustrations were often featured in the magazine Jultomten (Santa Claus).

== Biography ==
Her father, Carl Henrik Rydberg (1820–1902) was a writer and journalist. Her mother, Emma (1820–1899), was the granddaughter of portrait painter and sculptor Jonas Forsslund.

She studied at the Technical School in Stockholm and at the Royal Swedish Academy of Fine Arts. Thanks to a scholarship, she was able to study in Paris and at the artists' colony in Grez-sur-Loing.

In 1884, she married the painter, Johan Tirén, who she had met in Paris; most likely at a private art academy operated by Edvard Perséus. They had four children: Nils and Stina, who also became artists, Karin (1887–1951) and Elisabet (1890–1937). Johan's younger brother Karl was also a painter, in addition to being an ethnographer and folklorist.

She held numerous exhibitions, including ones at the Paris Salon (1885), the Norrköping Exhibition of Art and Industry (1906) and the Liljevalchs konsthall (1917). Together with her children, Nils and Stina, she created an exhibition at the Konstnärshuset in 1918.

Today, she is probably best remembered for 116 black and white illustrations she created in 1899 for an edition of Robinson Crusoe, published in a series of children's books called the Barnbiblioteket Saga. She illustrated several other books in that series, including Life in the Country by Fritz Reuter, as well as drawing designs for Christmas and Easter cards.

She was buried next to her husband at the Länna kyrkogård and was later joined there by her children..

== Other sources ==
- Svenskt konstnärslexikon part V, pg. 455, Allhems Förlag, Malmö.
- Gerda Tirén @ the Konstnärslexikonett Amanda
