= Stina Tirén =

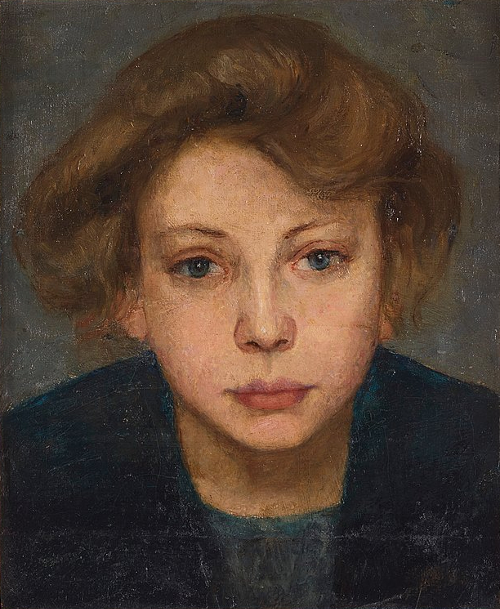
Stina Tirén; portrait by Ester Ellqvist

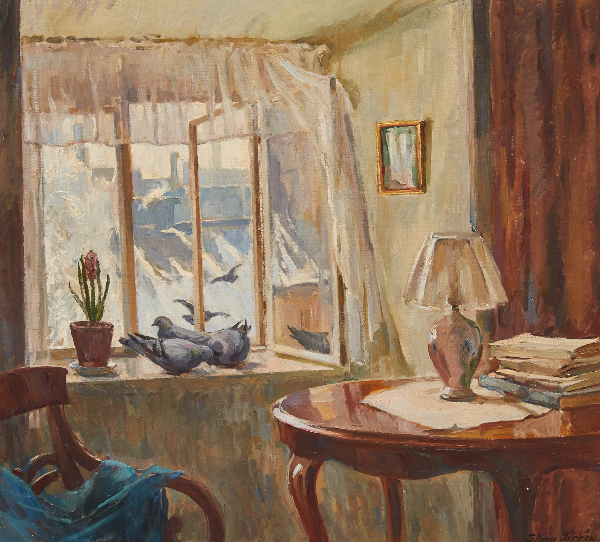
Pigeons in the Window

Gerda Emma Kristina Tirén, known as Stina (25 October 1886, Stockholm - 5 December 1951, Länna Parish) was a Swedish painter of landscapes, portraits and still-lifes.

== Biography ==
Her parents, Johan Tirén and Gerda Rydberg, were both artists. Her brother Nils also became a painter. She studied at the Royal Swedish Academy of Fine Arts from 1905 to 1910. While there, she also took lessons from Axel Tallberg at his etching school. In 1921, she was awarded a scholarship by the Kinmanson's Fund.

She was a regular participant in exhibitions arranged by the Society for Jämtland Art Culture and the Jämtland County Art Association. Her first major exhibitions came in 1911, at the academy, under the auspices of the Föreningen Svenska Konstnärinnor (Association of Swedish Female Artists). This was followed by showings at the Skånska konstmuseum in Lund (1912), and the Baltic Exhibition of 1914.

A joint exhibition with her mother and brother was presented at the Konstnärshuset in 1918 During the 1920s and 30s, she participated in several exhibitions held by the Swedish General Art Association at Liljevalchs konsthall.

Her largest showing was at the academy in 1941, where she filled three large halls with a series of "Northern Landscapes". Jämtland and Härjedalen were among her favorite places to paint. She also produced numerous portraits, including several of her family, and provided illustrations for the Barnbiblioteket Saga (Children's Library Saga), a series of periodicals published from 1899 to 1954.

Her works may be seen at the Nationalmuseum, the Nordiska museet and the Jämtlands länsmuseum in Östersund.
