= Nils Tirén =

Swedish painter and graphic artist

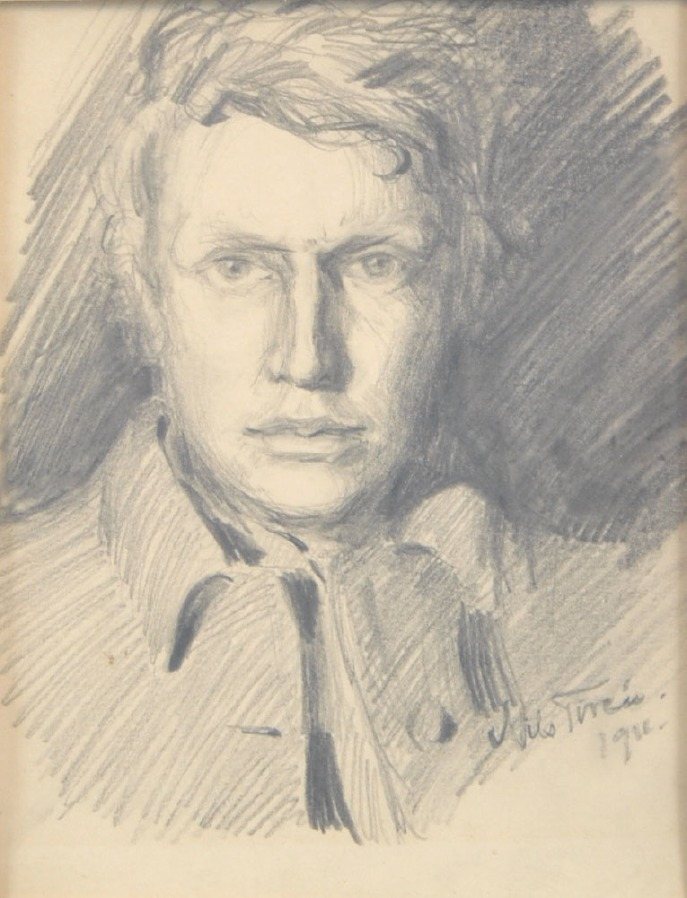
Self-portrait (1916)

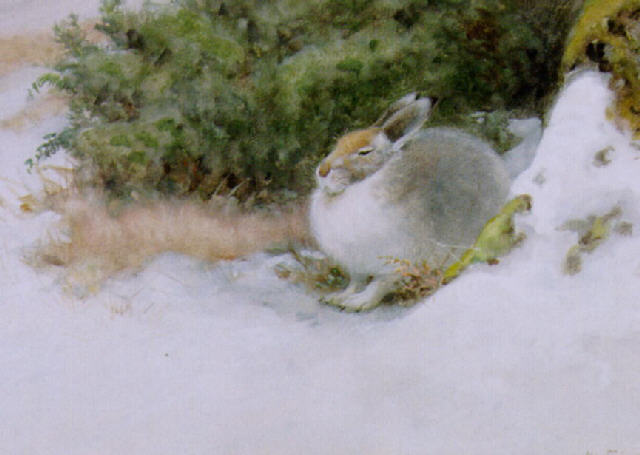
Hare in a Winter Landscape

Nils Tirén (19 August 1885, Ovikens Parish, Jämtland - 16 March 1935, Länna Parish, Uppland) was a Swedish painter and graphic artist.

== Biography ==
He was the son of Johan Tirén and Gerda Rydberg, who were both artists. His sister, Stina, also became a painter.

After completing his basic education in Jämtland, he attended several art schools. His early works were mostly watercolors, inspired by his father's works and the animal paintings of Bruno Liljefors. As an animal painter, he spent a great deal of time making observations in nature, to catch his subjects at just the right moment. Eventually, this led him to become a prominent hunter and game manager.

His works were presented several times at exhibitions of the Swedish Public Art Association in Stockholm, and at the Baltic Exhibition of 1914. He held a joint exhibition with his mother and sister at the Konstnärshuset in 1918. A memorial exhibition of all three was held at the Liljevalchs konsthall, shortly after his death.

As an illustrator, he created approximately 80 school teaching posters, and illustrated some volumes of the Barnbiblioteket Saga, a magazine for children and young people.

His first marriage was to Agnes Charlotta Brunnberg. In 1927, he married Viola Sandström. Their son, Kåre, became a music teacher and cartoonist.
