= Törnros =

Törnros (Swedish form) or Tørnros (Norwegian form) is a Scandinavian surname meaning 'dog rose'. Notable people with the surname include:

- Erik Törnros (born 1993), Swedish football player
- Gustaf Törnros (1887–1941), Swedish long-distance runner
- Nabot Törnros (1878–1914), Swedish painter, illustrator and cartoonist
- Yngvar Tørnros (1894–1967), Norwegian footballer
