= My Mother Gets Married =

1936 Moa Martinson novel

- 1976 edition
- Author: Moa Martinson
- Original title: Mor gifter sig
- Translator: Margaret S Lacy
- Language: Swedish
- Set in: Östergötland, Sweden
- Published: 1936
- Publisher: Albert Bonniers förlag
- Publication place: Sweden
- English publication date: 1973

My Mother Gets Married (Swedish: Mor gifter sig, lit. 'Mother Gets Married') is a 1936 novel by Swedish writer Moa Martinson. It was translated into English by Margaret S Lacy, published in 1973.
