= Gustaf Theodor Wallén =

Swedish painter and sculptor

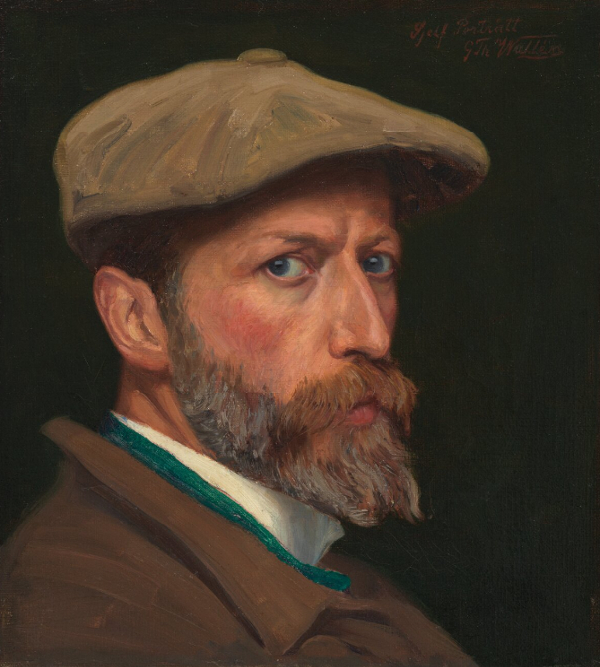
Self-portrait (1900s)

Gustaf Theodor Wallén (14 December 1860, Stockholm - 15 January 1948, Leksand), was a Swedish painter, graphic artist, and sculptor.

== Biography ==
He was born to Fritz Leonard Wallén, a master carpenter, and his wife, Maria Gustava née Östergren. He began his studies in 1878, at a vocational school operated by the Royal Swedish Academy of Fine Arts, but applied for admission to the Academy itself the following year. He was accepted, and studied with Georg von Rosen. From 1885, he participated in the Academy's exhibitions and, in 1887, was presented with a Royal Medal for his painting "The Beach at Kivik". This enabled him to apply for several scholarships.

After receiving a major stipend, he spent the years 1888-1892 on study trips throughout Europe and North Africa. In Paris, for a short time, he studied with William Bouguereau at the Académie Julian, then attended the Académie Colarossi. He also exhibited at the Salon. Several summers were spent at artists' colonies in Concarneau and Capri.

When he returned to Sweden, he studied etching with Axel Tallberg. In addition to landscape and portrait paintings, in oils and watercolors, he created sculptures; notably the reliefs on the doors of the Konstnärshuset at the Academy. From 1894, he was a regular exhibitor at the Swedish Artists' Association and, from 1926, at the Dalarna Art Association. He also had showings at numerous single events, but tended to be very withdrawn and reluctant to sell his works. His first solo exhibition was in 1947.

Around 1900, he settled in Leksand, and joined a circle of artists led by Gustaf Ankarcrona. Shortly before his death, he donated his home and studio, and a substantial cash endowment, to establish the Leksand Folk High School, which teaches arts and crafts.

His works may be seen at the Nationalmuseum, Dalarnas Museum, and the Leksand Museum. He was interred at the Norra Begravningsplatsen in Stockholm.

== Selected works ==
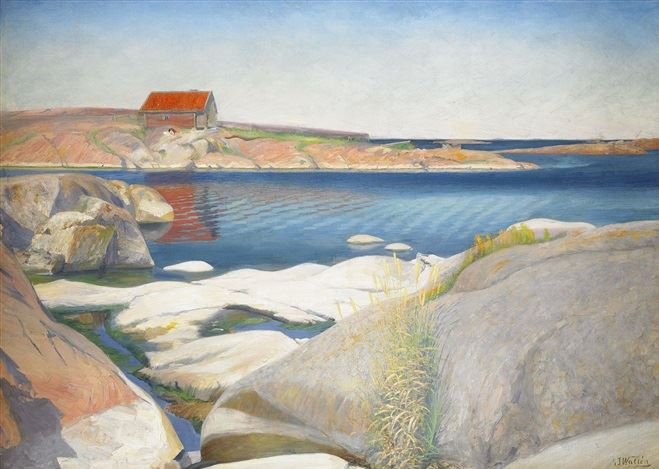
View from Horssten

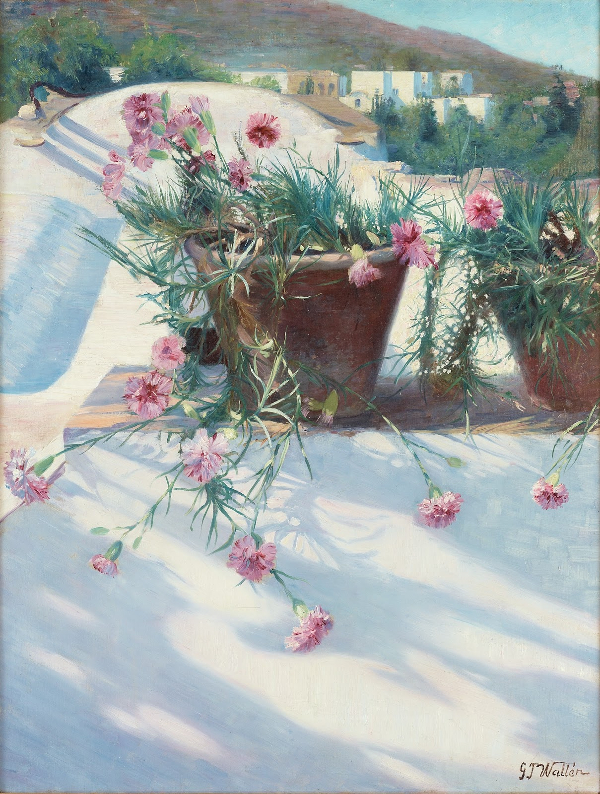
Southern Village with Carnations in a Pot

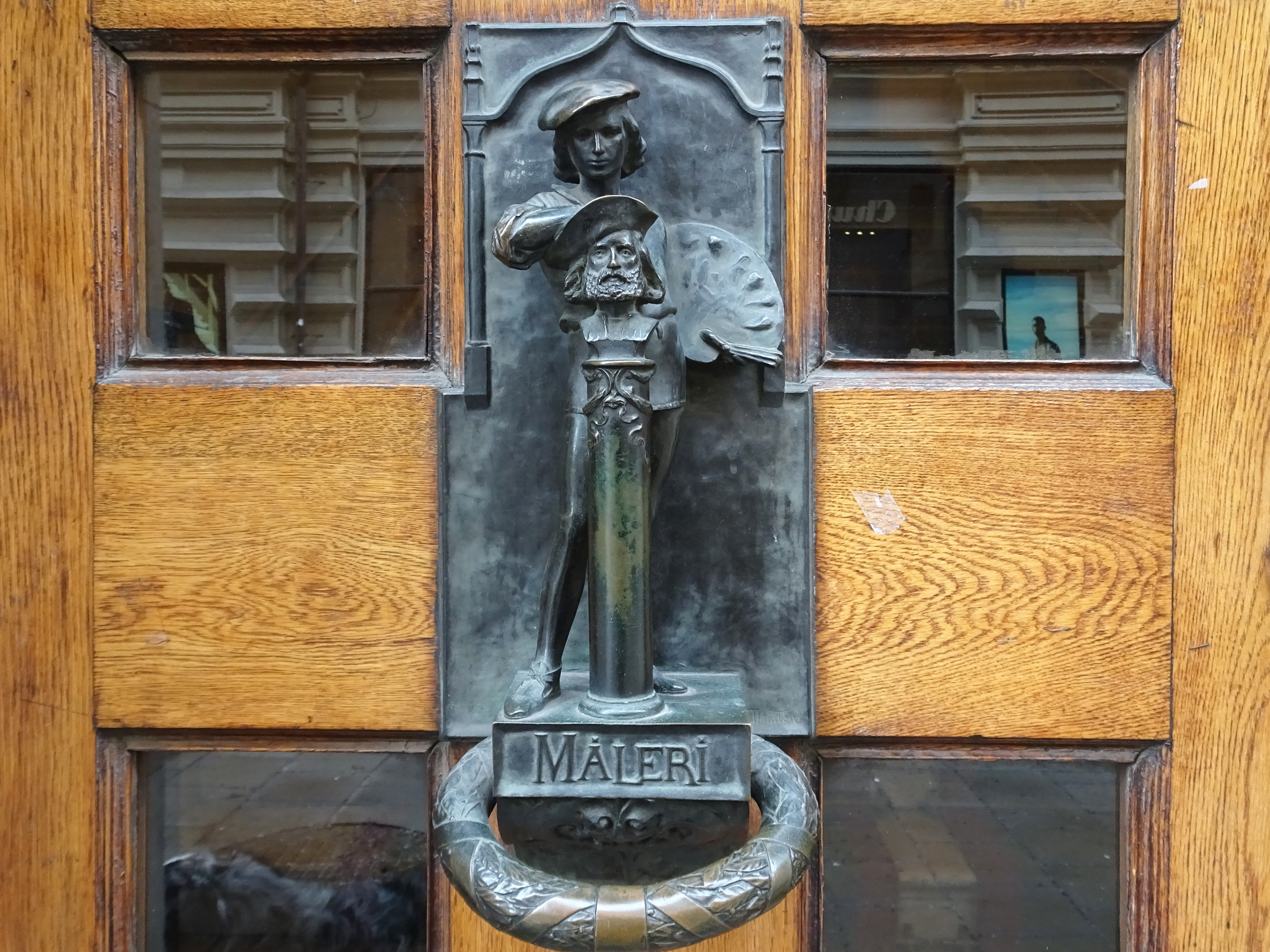
"Painting", at the Konstnärshuset

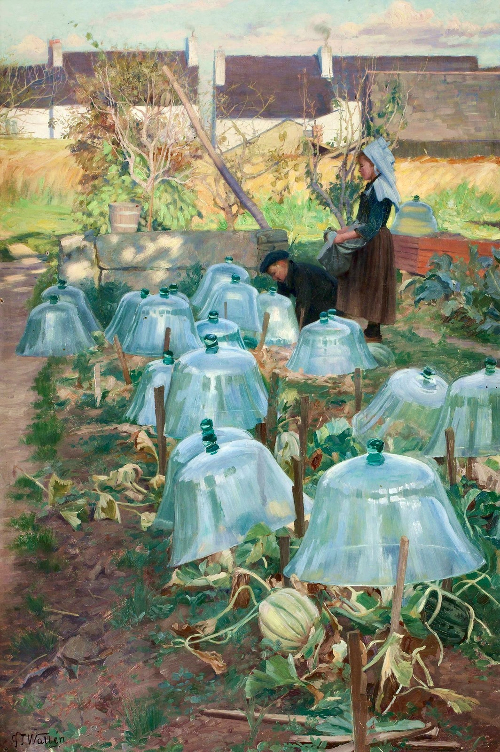
Growing Pumpkins in Brittany

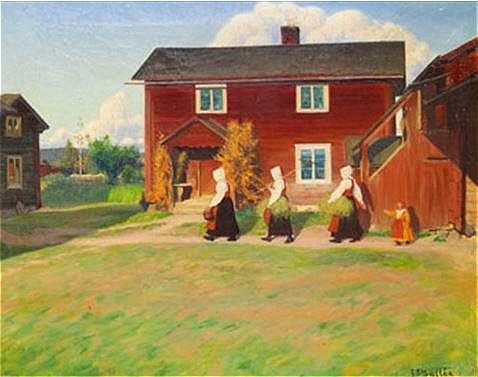
Farmyard
