= Einar von Strokirch =

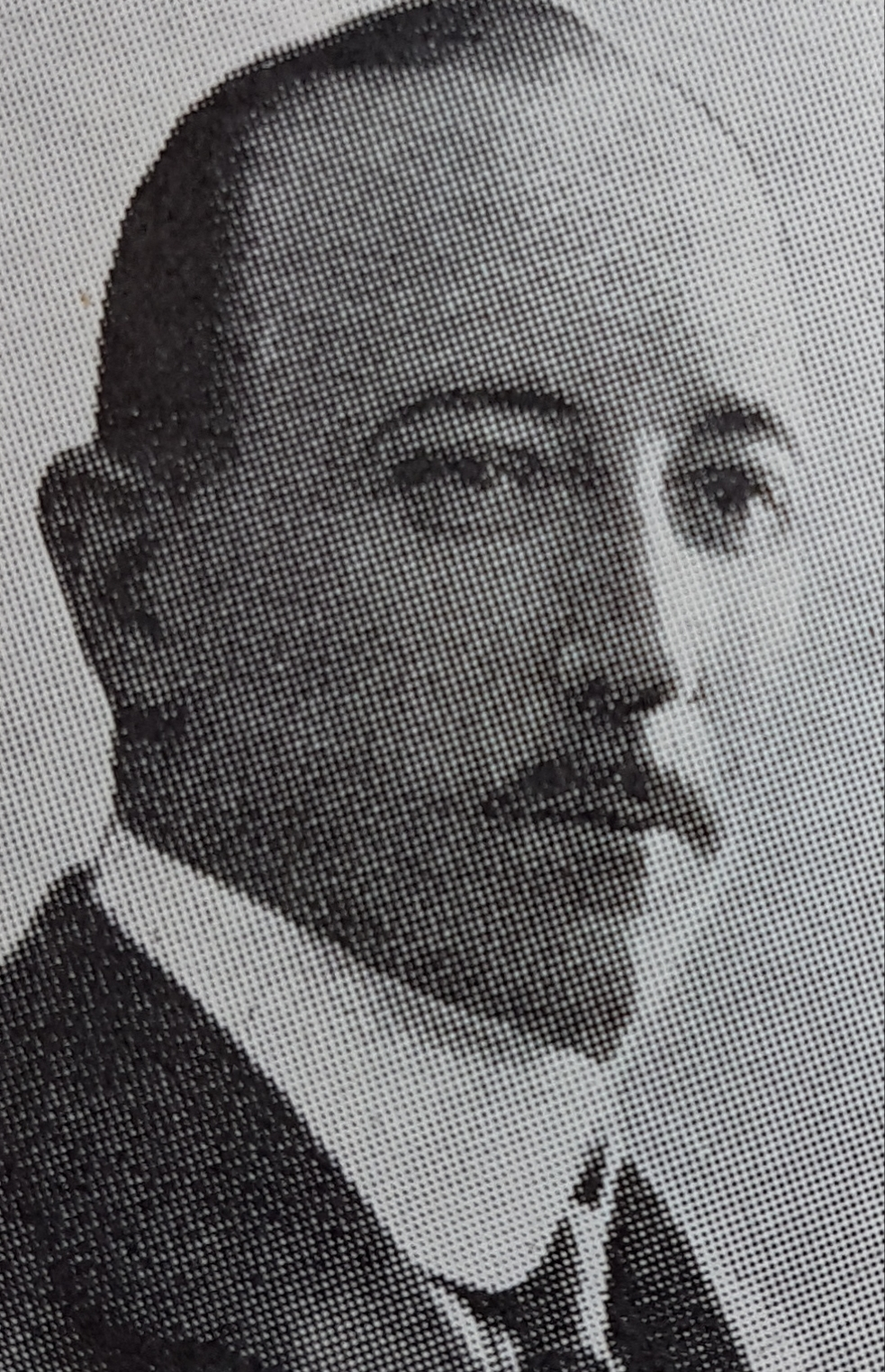
Einar von Strokirch (date unknown)

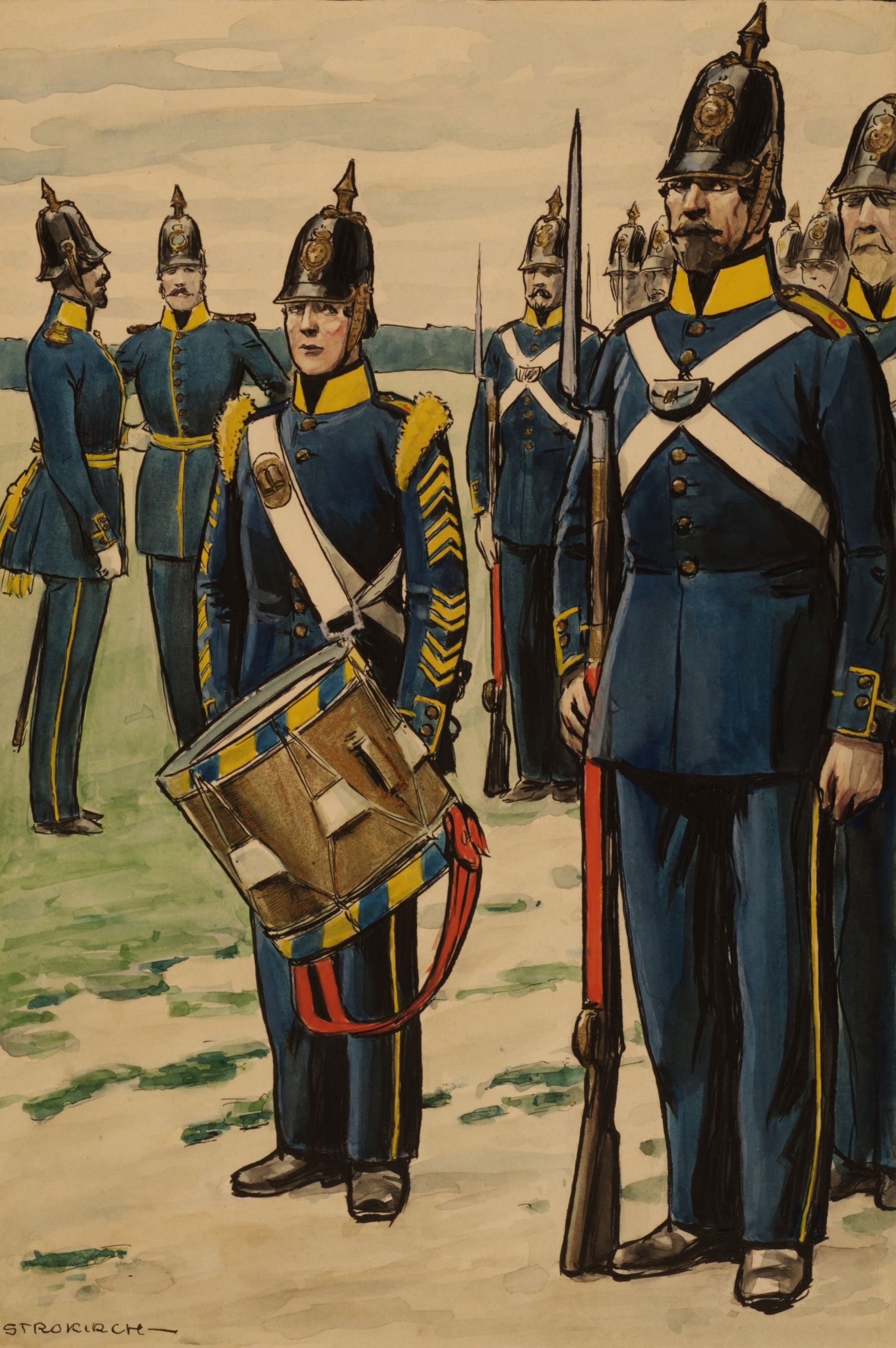
The Västgöta Regiment in 1845

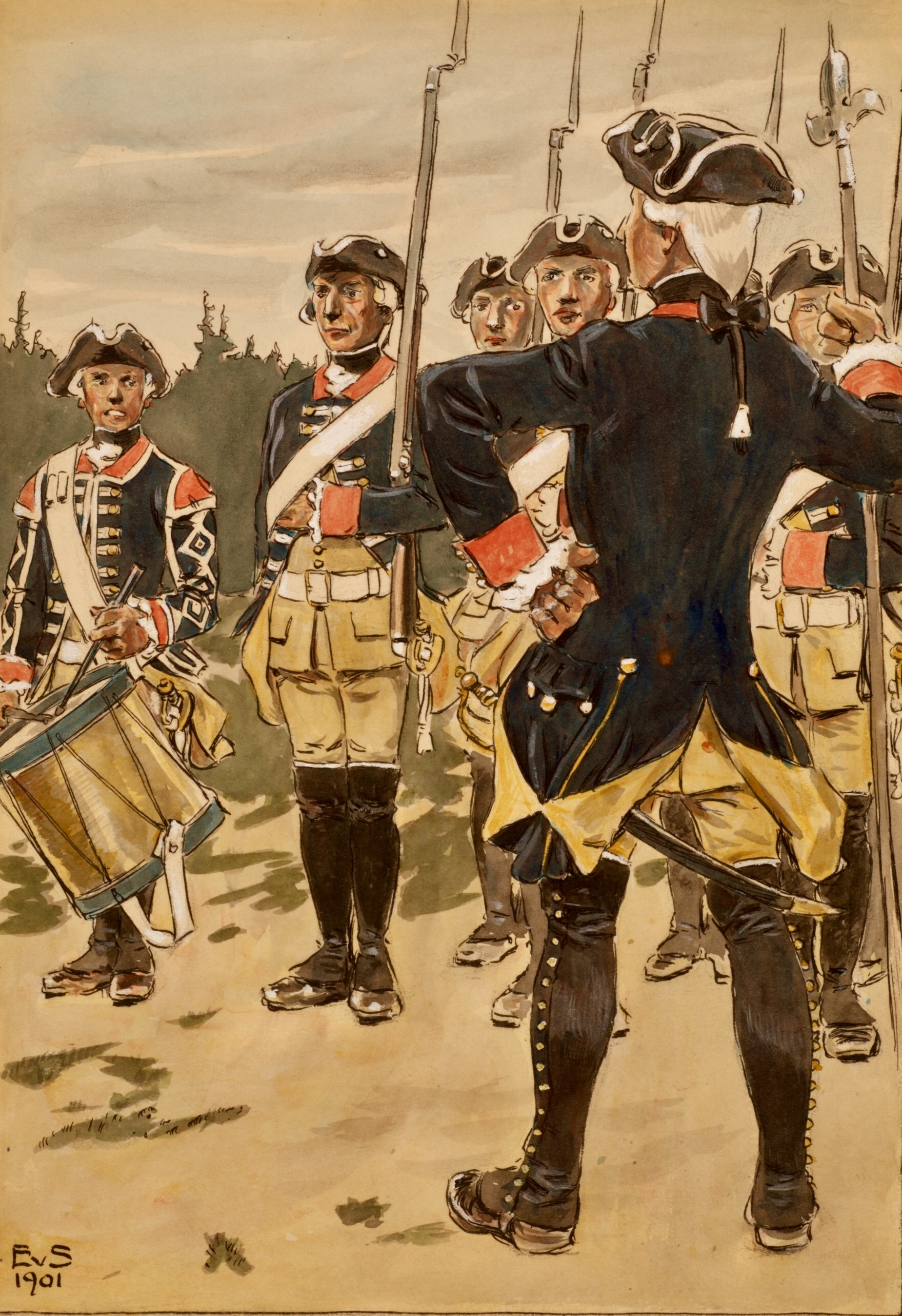
The Uppland Regiment in 1765

Einar Fredrik Bernhard von Strokirch (22 April 1879, Styrshult, Skaraborg County - 9 November 1932, Hjo) was a Swedish painter, graphic artist, illustrator and writer.

== Life and work ==
He was the son of Christoffer von Strokirch, a landowner, and his wife, Baroness Gustava Charlotta Ingeborg Carolina Fleetwood. His first studies were at the Althins målarskola, a private school in Stockholm, then with the animal painter, Heinrich von Zügel, at the Academy of Fine Arts, Munich. He was also engaged in a substantial amount of self-study; involving trips to Denmark, Holland, France, Belgium and England.

His first major exhibition was in 1903, at a show devoted to Swedish art in Helsingborg. Together with Nabot Törnros and Jacob Sandberg, he helped to organize exhibitions in Hjo. He married Gabriella Bohman in 1919. From 1921 to 1924, he was an artistic advisor at the Swedish Theatre, and assisted in the production of several historical plays. His works include historical scenes, portraits, landscapes and animals, but he is best known for his depictions of uniformed soldiers, from different times and regiments, thoroughly researched to ensure their accuracy.

As an illustrator, he provided cartoons to the humor magazines, Strix and Puck from 1902 to 1910, and made occasional contributions to the Svenska Dagbladet, as well as some English publications. His book illustrations were numerous, including those for Karolinerna, by Verner von Heidenstam, En strid om Rom, by Felix Dahn. On his own, he published Svenska arméns munderingar 1680–1905 (Swedish Army Uniforms) and Hur hemmet danas (How a Home is Designed). He also wrote short stories and published two novels under the pseudonym "Ernst Blom".

His works may be seen at the Nationalmuseum, Stockholm, the Museum of Göteborg, Armémuseum, the Kalmar läns museum, and in the collection of King Gustav VI Adolf. They are also a prominent feature in some officers' messes.
