= Gustaf Ankarcrona =

Swedish painter (1869–1933)

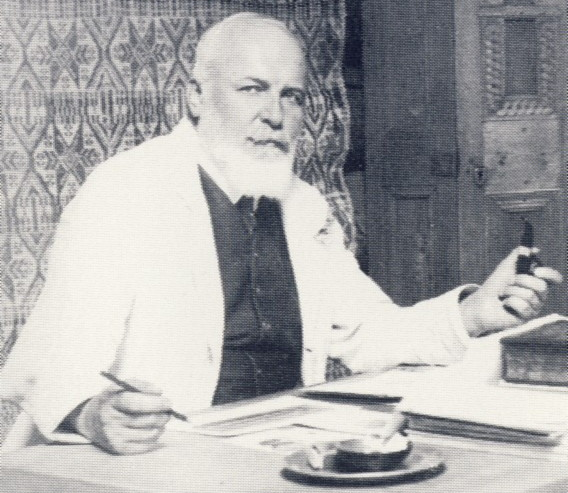
Gustaf Ankarcrona (c.1930)

Sten Gustaf Herman Ankarcrona (11 May 1869, Huskvarna - 17 September 1933, Tällberg) was a Swedish painter. He was also known for his early efforts in historical and cultural preservation, especially in Dalarna. His paintings focused on rural subject matter, often depicted in winter settings.

== Biography ==
He was a member of the noble Ankarcrona family. His father, Emil, was the Director of the Huskvarna Rifle Factory. His sister, Anna, was a well known textile artist.

He began his education at the Per Brahe Secondary School, from 1883–1885. Having shown an interest in and aptitude for art, the painter Georg von Rosen was sufficiently impressed to recommend that he should receive professional art instruction. He also suggested that Germany would be a more suitable place for those studies than Paris. Accordingly, he spent the years 1886 to 1889 at the Academy of Arts, Berlin. From 1889 to 1890, he was in Norway, applying what he had learned. After returning to Berlin, he came under the influence of the Dachau School, which involved a style of painting known as "heimat-kunst" (home art). In 1895, he returned to Sweden and, from 1896 to 1901, had a studio in Stockholm where he specialized in portraits.

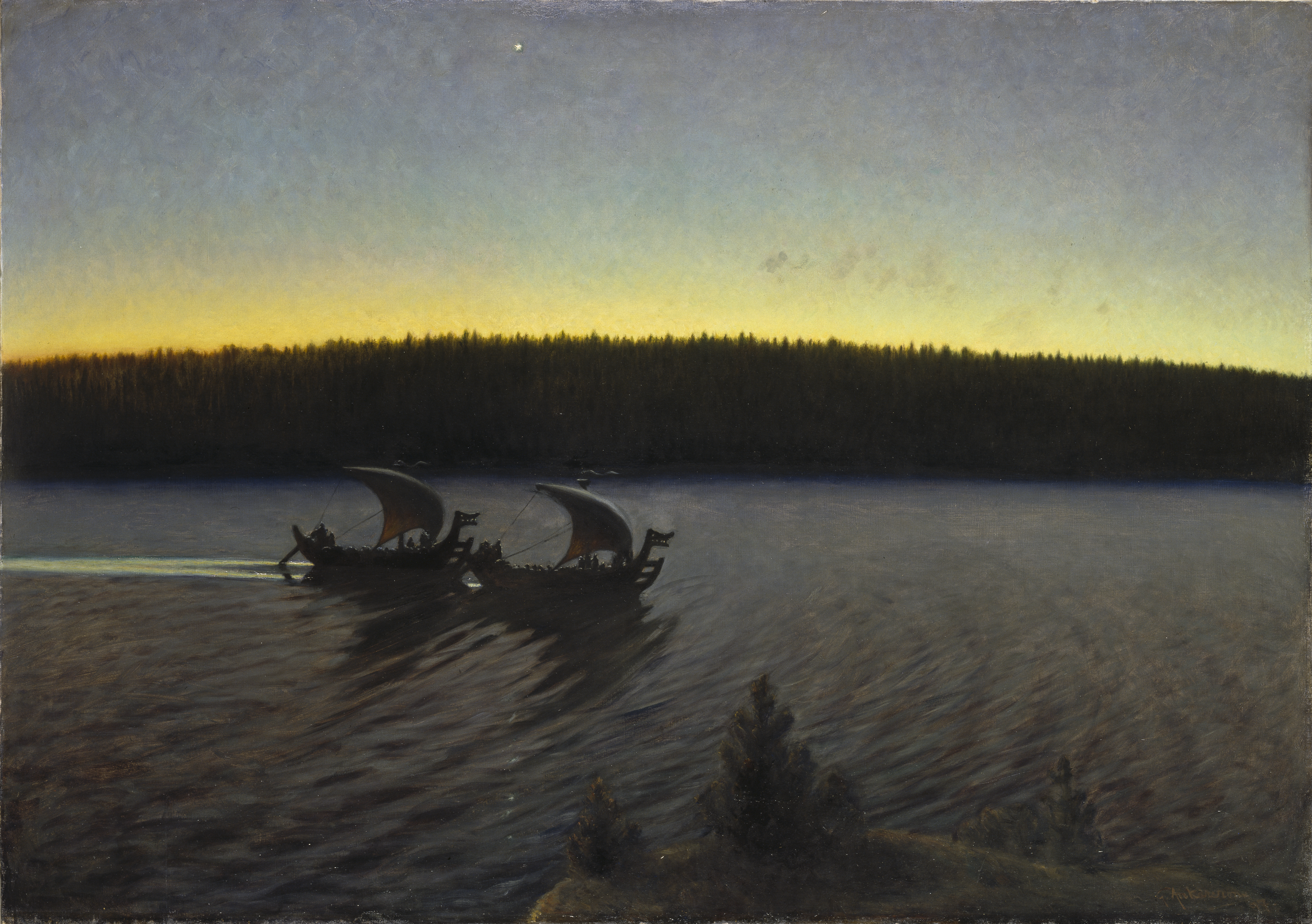
In Days of Yore (1897)

In 1890, he became a member of the Konstnärsförbundet, a group that stood in opposition to the methods of the Royal Academy, although his views on art were not especially radical. He participated in several of their exhibitions until 1898, when he was excluded for not following the assigned program.

The year 1901 was an important turning point for his career, when he visited Gävle and encountered a group of peasants from Leksand dressed in their native costumes. He was so enthused over what he saw that he immediately planned a trip to the area around Siljan in Dalarna, an area that had long attracted artists of the Düsseldorf School. Now it was home to a new art colony whose members included Emerik Stenberg, Ivar Nyberg, Paul Graf and Gustaf Theodor Wallén.

=== Preservationist ===
Although he came to paint, he soon became more interested in the rapidly disappearing rural culture. Soon, he had put together a large collection of cultural objects and began teaching preservation. He was particularly interested in wood carving and textiles and would often seek out older women who could still weave old patterns to place orders with them. Much of his work was inspired by that of the folklorist, Artur Hazelius.

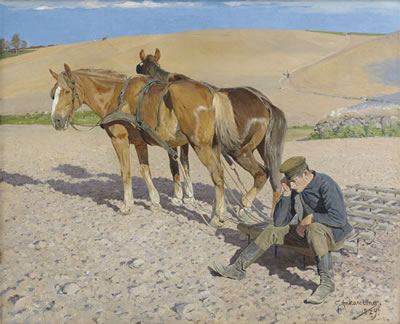
Resting (1889)

He felt that homes should be intimately connected to their environment, and that each parish should preserve at least one old farm as a cultural center. His personal contribution to that project was the Hembygdsgården Holen in Tällberg, which he bought in 1908. Later, he bought several other old buildings which he had transported to there and rebuilt. The Holen served as both a museum and his personal residence. He also became interested in dalmålning, a local form of wallpaper painting, and grew quite knowledgeable on the subject, but published very little.

In 1915, he created the "Dalarnas Memorial and Homebuilding Association" which produced articles for the Lantbrukstidskrift för Dalarne, a local periodical.

In addition to these activities, he was involved in the Ungdomsrörelsen, a quasi-political youth group, and promoted sobriety. He also designed some buildings in Leksand, including Erik Axel Karlfeldt's farm. In his later years, he became something of a colorful local character; driving about in a carriage he had painted himself, drawn by a white horse.
