= Moa Martinson =

Swedish writer (1890–1964)

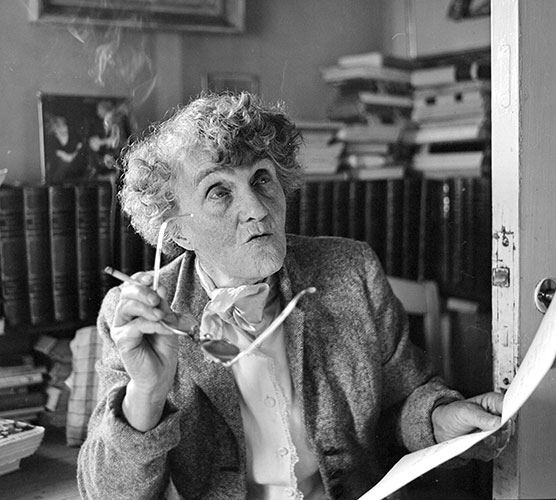
- Moa Martinson in 1957
- Born: Helga Maria Swarts; 2 November 1890; Vårdnäs, Sweden
- Died: 5 August 1964 (aged 73); Sorunda, Sweden
- Spouses: Karl Johansson (1922–1928); Harry Martinson (1929–1940)
- Writing career
- Language: Swedish
- Notable works: Women and apple trees My Mother Gets Married
- Notable awards: The Nine Society's Grand Prize

Moa Martinson (born Helga Maria Swarts (Note: sometimes spelt Swartz); 2 November 1890 – 5 August 1964) was one of Sweden's most noted authors of proletarian literature. Her ambition was to change society with her authorship and to portray the conditions of the working class, and also the personal development of women. Her works were about motherhood, love, poverty, politics, religion, urbanization and the hard living conditions of the working-class woman.

== Early life ==
Martinson was born on 2 November 1890 in Vårdnäs, Linköping Municipality. Her mother was Kristina Swartz (sometimes spelt Christina Schwartz) who served as a maid wherever jobs were available. There are no legal records stating who her father was, but according to researchers Annika Johansson and Bonnie Festin, he was probably Anders Teodor Andersson, a farmhand who served at the Kärr farm in Motala at the same time as Swartz. Since she carried, what in those days was referred to as an illegitimate child, she had to go to her parents home for the birth. Swartz' father, Nils Peter Swartz, was a poor soldier who lived with his wife, Carin Olofsdotter, in a derelict croft in Vårdnäs. On 17 February 1891, Swartz sued Andersson (Note: At that time renamed Lundin by the factory he then worked for.) for child support at the Motala district court, (Note: Tingsrätten, up until 1971 called häradsrätten.) where two witnesses testified that they had seen her and Andersson in the same bed around the time the child would have been conceived. Andersson failed to appear in court in February as well as on the two following hearings. Swartz finally said that he had gone to America and the proceedings were stayed.

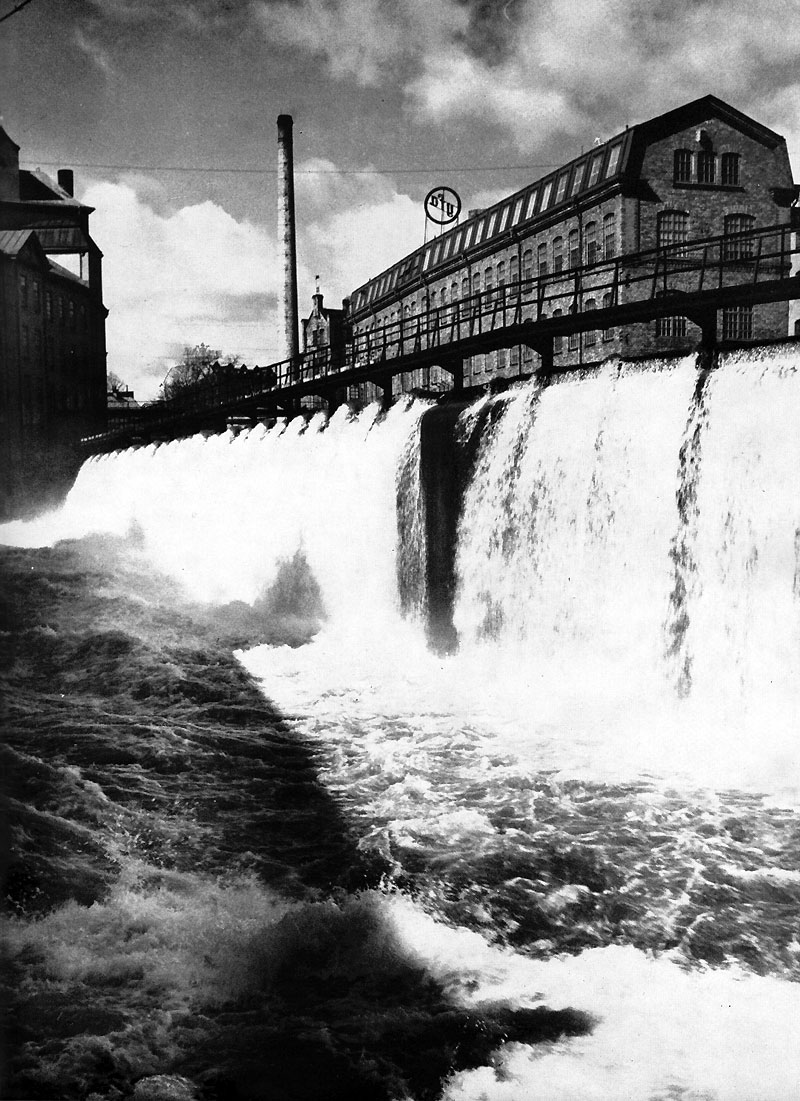
One of the textile mills in Norrköping, Förenade Yllefabrikerna, 1953

The identity of her father was unknown to Martinson her entire life, but her speculations about who it could be were an inspiration for her work. In her book Pigmamma ("Maid Mother") she portrays her mother's situation as pregnant with a married man's child. At one point she thought that her father was a married man, whom her mother had worked for. Her romantic view of her mysterious father decreased as time went by. In her book Mor gifter sig (My Mother Gets Married), written twelve years later, it became clear how much Martinson despised her absent father. In Fjäderbrevet (The Feather Letter), written another six years later, there is no mention of him at all.

During the first years of her life, Martinson lived with her paternal grandparents and their youngest daughter Hulda while Swartz worked as a maid or in the textile mills in Norrköping. There are several discrepancies in the timeline of Martinson's early years between official records and her books. These are most likely due to that her stories built on the oral traditions of the family. In 1892, her grandfather became ill and died and her grandmother could no longer take care of Martinson so she went to live with her mother. There is no record of where they lived until 1894, when they moved to Norrköping. Swartz earned very little money. In 1894–1896, she worked at Norrköping's wool weaving mills, where working conditions were extremely bad and wages low. During her early school years, Martinson had a stepfather, Alfred Karlsson, who she described as an alcoholic. He was a sometime statare who worked odd jobs in the countryside outside Norrköping. He married Swartz on 11 March 1896, and they had three more daughters, but they all died within days of being born. After the years at the textile mill, the family moved several times to different locations in Östergötland, settling down for a time wherever work was available. This affected Martinson's schooling since they only stayed in one place for a couple of months. Despite this, she left school with high marks after six years in 1903. She was confirmed in 1905 in Risinge Church, Finspång Municipality, after which she got her first job at a farm in Vikbolandet.

In Martinson's book Kvinnor och äppleträd (Women and Apple Trees), which is set in Norrköping, she described the hard and ruthless situation that she and her mother was in during the 1890s. Because of the book, Martinson was accused for denigration by right-wing critics, but Martinson said that what she did was the opposite. The different run-down lodgings the family moved in and out of are described in the books Kyrkbröllop (Church wedding) and (My Mother Gets Married) as well as in a couple of the short stories in Jag möter en diktare (I meet a poet).

=== Kitchen maid and pantry chef ===
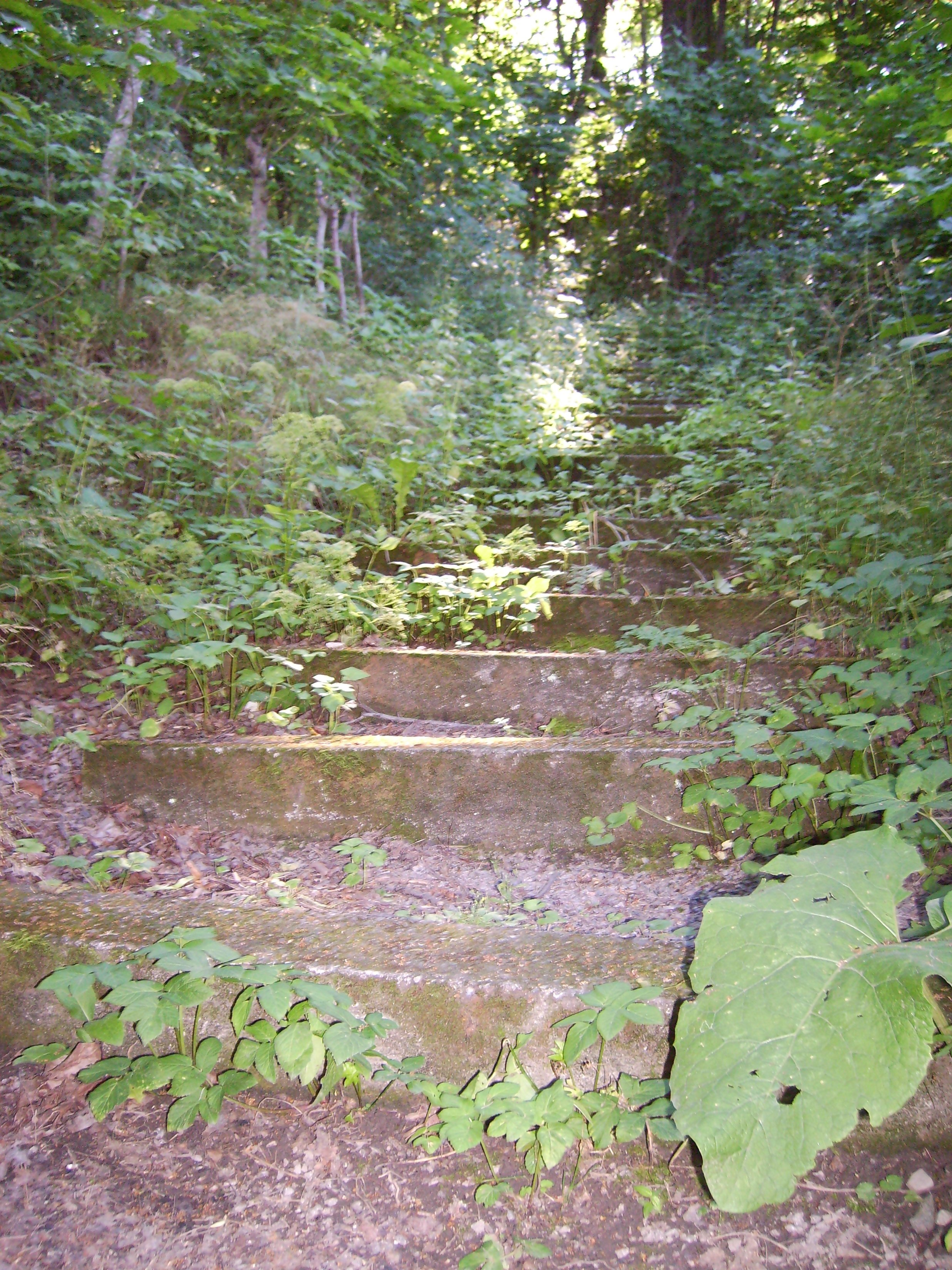
Moa Martinsson's Stairs in Sylten, Norrköping

At the age of fifteen, she trained to become a pantry chef; at the time, she was the youngest in that profession in Sweden. During the summer of 1906, she worked as a kitchen maid in the main restaurant at the Norrköping Exhibition of Art and Industry. Situated at the top of Syltberget ("Sylt Hill"), the restaurant was accessed by an 80-steps stairway. In Kungens rosor (The King's Roses), Martinsson recounts her work in the restaurant and mentions the stairs. The novel got its name from a conversation that she had at the exhibition with King Oscar II of Sweden on 3 July 1906. The conversation revolved around flowers, which the King said that he felt had souls. As of 2016, the stairs remain and have been named "Moa Martinson's Stairs".

In the midst of summer, she walks down the eighty steps. Counting them out loud one after the other, even though she knows very well their number. It is cloudy, almost dark, even though it is only July. The bright nights are waning. The scents of roses and honeysuckles waft around her. She stops, enthralled by the silence and beauty of the summer night. The noise from the day's bustle still lingers in her ears.

— From The King's Roses

In 1906, Martinson moved to Stockholm in the hope of getting a job, but this turned out to be harder than she expected. During the financial depression of 1907–1909, she had to move back to Norrköping. At this time, she followed events related to concerns about the labour market. This period of Martinson's life had a significant impact on her political engagement. She also wrote poems and sent a collection to a notary interested in literature, but her work was rejected. She later described the poems as "lofty", since that was how she thought such texts should be written.

== First marriage ==
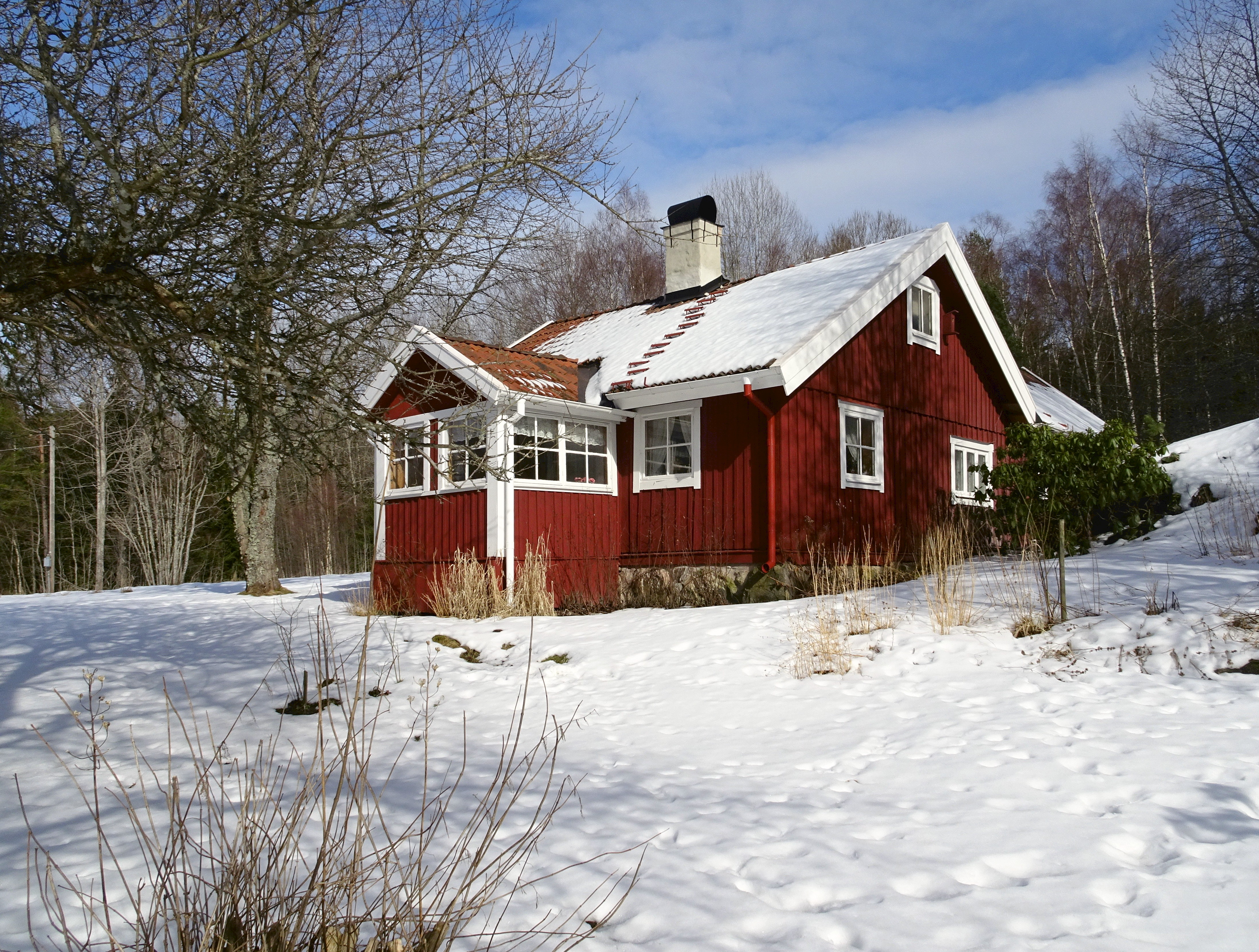
Johannesdal torp where Martinson lived

In 1908–1909, Martinson worked as a pantry chef at restaurants and hotels in Sweden. In the winter of 1909, she met Karl Johansson in Ösmo. He was nine years older, and was a stone worker who lived with his brother Valfrid and their father Johan Petter in a torp called Johannesdal, in the woods between Ösmo and Sorunda. She became pregnant in March 1909 and Johansson proposed, but Martinson was doubtful about marrying him. Despite this, she and Karl moved to Johannesdal and in her book Den osynlige älskaren ("The Invisible Lover") she wrote about her first year as mother and wife, the hard life in Johannesdal and how she desperately wanted to get away.

In 1910, her first son Olof was born, and in 1922 she and Johansson were married. The reason she hesitated for such a long time to marry him was partly due to Johansson's drinking and partly because she did not want to live in the dark forest. After the birth of Olof, the family soon expanded. In 1911, their second son Tore was born, followed by three more sons: Erik in 1913, Manfred in 1914 and Knut in 1916. The birth of Knut was especially hard, since she had to deliver him all alone on the kitchen floor in the torp. Martinson recounted the birth in Kvinnor och äppelträd, which has been called "one of Swedish literature's most powerful depictions of a childbirth".

Life on Johannesdal was poor and hard but the upbringing of her sons was important to Martinson. She was opposed to spanking children and disliked the militant nationalistic romanticism taught in schools at the time.

== Political involvement ==
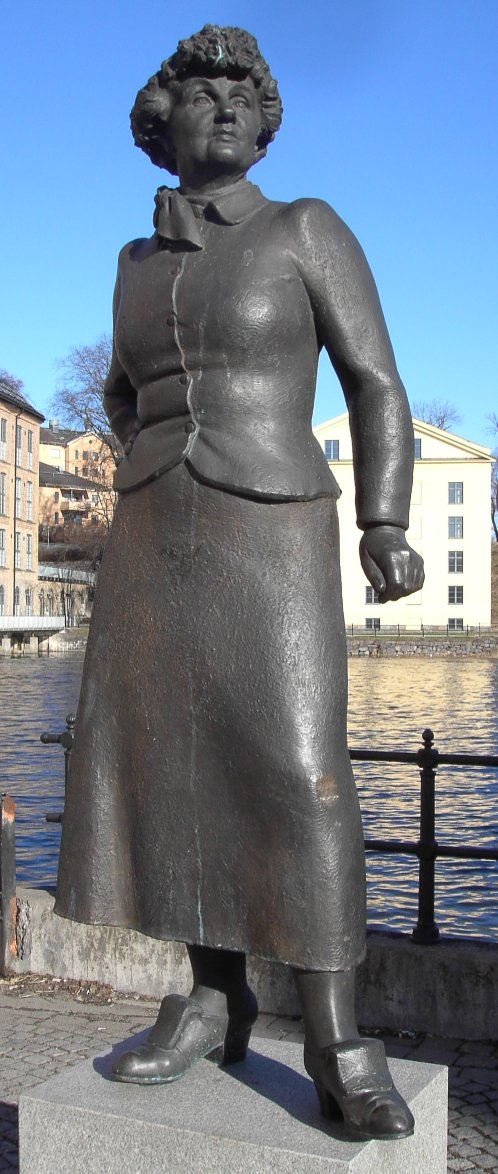
Statue of Moa Martinsson in Norrköping, by Peter Linde

Martinson's political interest started to develop in 1921, when unemployment in Sweden was higher than ever before, and in 1922 she and Johansson joined the Central Organisation of the Workers of Sweden where Martinson became very active. To further educate herself, she read the works of authors like Fyodor Dostoyevsky, Émile Zola, Maxim Gorky and Martin Andersen Nexø. Because of her political interest in better pay and conditions for workers and her ability to speak in any context, she was elected to the municipal council in Sorunda where she represented the Labour Party. She resigned from office in 1926. In November 1922, Martinsson wrote her first article for the syndicalist paper Arbetaren's ("The Worker's") page for women. She continued writing for the paper and in 1923 she had articles published weekly in Arbetaren. In her articles she wrote about how men and women should work together for a better world. She frequently engaged in debates, especially those involving women's issues.

With her work for Arbetaren she developed her writing skills, but even though she often pushed the boundaries in her articles, she went too far in 1924, when she wrote that women and men should receive equal pay for equal work. Quarrels started at the magazine, resulting in Martinson resigning from the paper, but due to her contributions in Arbetaren she was now known to the public although mostly in syndicalistic circles.

One author who had significant impact on Martinson was Martin Andersen Näxö. It was the first time she recognized her own experiences in a literary work. She wrote a letter to him, telling him about her own life and also sent an article she had written for Arbetaren. Näxö responded positively, telling her she should write a book about her life. Shortly afterwards Martinson started writing the book Pigmamman ("The Maid Mother"). In 1925, she worked for a new magazine called Vi kvinnor ("We women"), where she contributed with articles, novels and causeries.

== Magazine articles ==
In April 1925, Martinson's two youngest sons, Manfred and Knut, went through the ice and drowned in Lake Styran by the torp and she was devastated. She worked incessantly to keep her grief at bay.

In September 1925, Vi Kvinnor was discontinued and soon after Martinson started working for Arbetaren again. She also worked for the paper Brand in April 1925, and became part of the political circles in Stockholm. She wrote her first story Pigmamma ("Maid Mother") in 1924–25, and it was published as a serial in Brand in 1927. In June 1926, her first article for Arbetarekuriren was published and in 1927 her work was published in Templar-kuriren ("The Templars Courier"), Arbetaren and Nynäshamns-posten ("The Nynäshamn Post"). In October that year, she was also writing for Tidevarvet (The Epoch) which was a politically radical magazine for women published by the Fogelstad Citizen School for Women with Elin Wägner as editor. Her first contribution was an article about unemployed men's women. She wrote it under a new signature, Moa, because she did not want the syndicalistic circles she moved in to see that she worked for a liberal magazine. However, her work for Tidevarvet was mostly novels and stories and her political articles were still published in the syndicalistic press. She had found the name "Moa" in the novel Jökeln (Bræen) by Danish author Johannes V. Jensen, where the character "Moa" was described as the first mother of humanity.

In November 1927, Martinson traveled to Gothenburg at the request of chief editor P.J. Welinder at the Arbetare-kuriren. She was hoping to be offered a job at the paper, but instead Welinder wanted her to work as a housemaid for him and do some writing for the magazine in exchange for food and shelter in his house. Martinson turned down the offer. While she was at the editorial office, she met Harry Martinson for the first time. He was a former sailor, now hobo writer who had been published in Brand and Arbetare-kuriren so she had heard of him and read some of his works.

== Johansson's death ==
Shortly after Martinson's return to Johannesdal, her husband was afflicted by a nervous disorder. He started hallucinating and could not eat or sleep. She tried to get him to a doctor but he refused. On 14 January 1928, Johansson committed suicide by putting a stick of dynamite in his mouth and lighting the fuse. By then, Martinson had considered divorcing him for a long time since theirs had not been an easy marriage. After Johansson's death her economic situation was difficult. Martinson's friends in Stockholm started a fund-raising and manage to collect SEK 3,300 to ease her financial situation. Having lost two sons and one husband, she became very depressed. In March 1928, she took a typing course at the Fogelstad Citizen School for Women and when she left the school it was as "Moa". During her stay at Fogelstad, she received a letter from Harry Martinson, who asked if he could come and stay for a while at the torp in Johannesdal so he could work. He arrived in the summer of 1928.

== Second marriage ==
During the summer of 1928, Martinson and Harry fell in love. However, in 1928–1929 she became more depressed and in March 1929, she was hospitalized at Södertälje hospital. During Martinson's stay in the hospital, Harry lived at Johannesdal and they communicated through letters. On 3 October 1929, they got married. Shortly thereafter, in May 1930, Harry was diagnosed with tuberculosis leaving Martinson devastated.

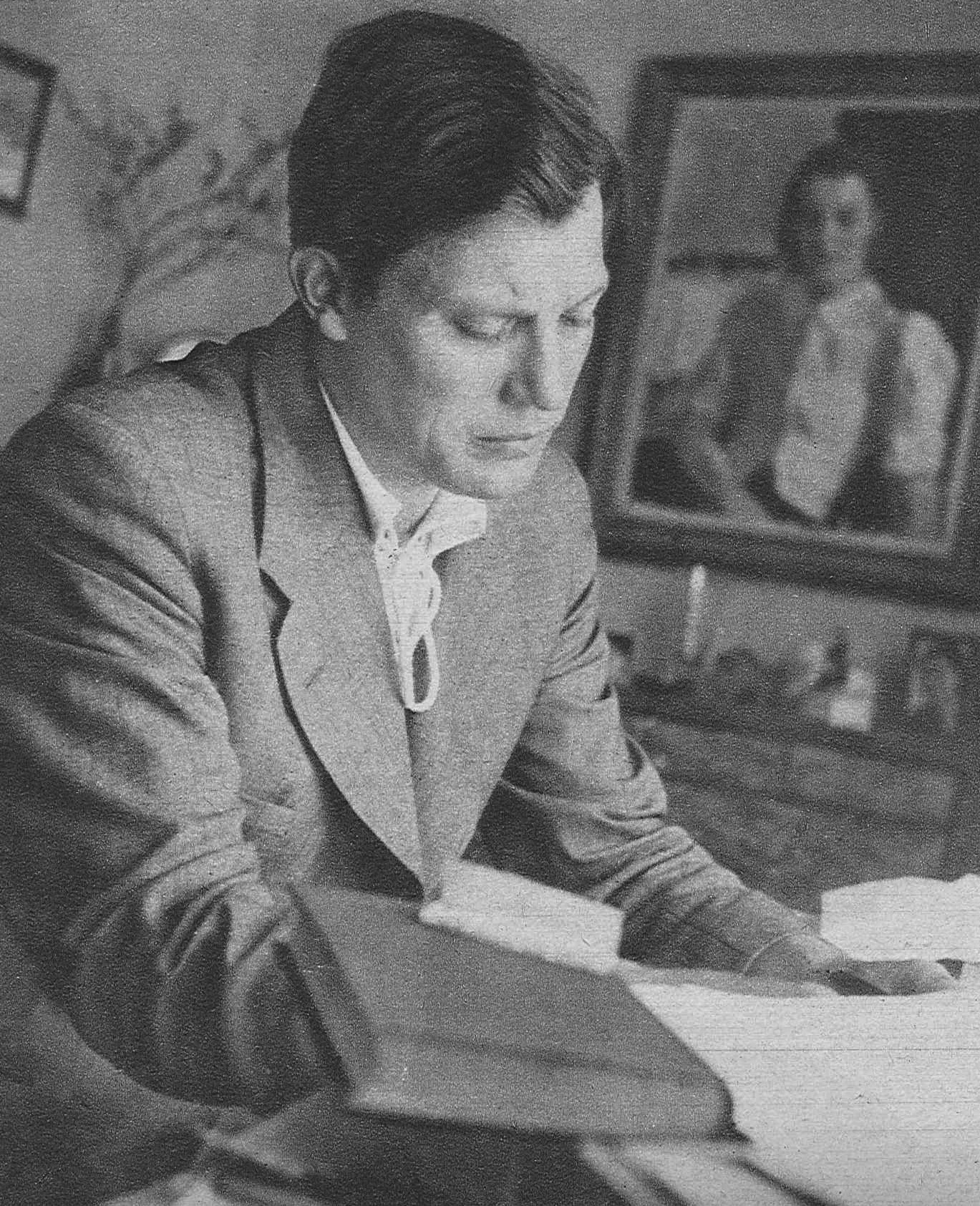
Harry Martinson in 1943

The couple had very little money so in 1932, Martinson sent a draft called En man byggde ("A man built") to publisher Tor Bonnier. She continued to develop the draft during the following year and when it was finalized into a book, the title was changed to Kvinnor och Äppleträd. It was published in 1933, and the author was named as "Moa Martinson". Because of the timing and the theme, the book was categorized as "modernist literature". This became Martinson's literary debut and it gained a lot of attention. Simultaneously, Harry was diagnosed with neurosis and Martinson was deeply concerned for him. He was fourteen years younger than she, and their marriage had not been easy. As writers, they also had very different styles. While Martinson was characterized as an unpolished realist, Harry was a refined modernist.

During the winter of 1933, their financial situation improved and they rented an apartment in Saltsjöbaden in the hope of solving their marriage problems. At the beginning of 1934 Harry suffered from depression. Up until then, he had never stayed in one place for such a long time as he had done with Martinson at Johannesdal. He started to leave the apartment now and then without any explanation of why or where he was going, and would be gone for days. Harry's friends blamed Martinson for his disappearance, and there were even those who believed that she was to blame for both his physical and mental pain. Not knowing where her husband was, Martinson soon became desperate with despair and jealousy. She even hired a private detective, but when this yielded nothing, she soon gave up. Unknown to Martinson, Harry had started to see a new woman during his time away from home. According to Kerstin Engman, the name of the woman was Karin L., and another source, Söderberg, speaks of a love affair with poet Karin Boye and several other women. In the summer of 1934, Harry confessed that he had been seeing another woman but said that he had ended the affair. Martinson became furious, but she forgave him.

However, Harry's affair with Karin was not over and the same summer they traveled to Tällberg in Dalarna. Harry told Martinson that he needed to be alone and that it would be good for them to be apart for a while. After a couple of weeks, Harry grew tired of Karin and returned to Johannesdal. During the last years of their marriage, he continued to wander off now and then from Martinson and Johannesdal.

=== Decline and divorce ===
On 6 June 1934, Harry abruptly left Martinson and the house in Johannesdal and took to the road again, leaving behind the manuscript for Flowering Nettle (Nässlorna blomma). When he had been gone ten days, Martinson posted a personal telegram on the Swedish radio (Note: Before the event of mobile phones, the Swedish Radio provided a service of reading "personal telegrams" (personligt telegram) as well as "wanted" notices from the police, on the radio in connection to some of the newscasts.) urging him to come home. With the announcement, Harry's flight became public and the story circulated in the newspapers. The couple kept in contact indirectly through their publishers and friends. On 2 August, Martinsson wrote to Harry that she was going to commit suicide and that the manuscript was going to follow her to the grave. She had buried the manuscript in the woods. The letter reached Harry while he worked his passage aboard a ship to Rotterdam. A week later, he was back home in Johannesdal and he, Martinson and one of their sons dug up the manuscript.

In August 1934, the couple were invited to the first All Union Congress of Soviet Writers in Moscow as part of the Swedish delegation. Gorky became the first chairman of the congress during which the new doctrine of Socialist realism was formed. Martinson became fascinated by the communist society, while Harry was appalled by Stalin's cult of personality.

In the autumn of 1935, the tension between Martinson and Harry seemed to have disappeared. She was working on Mor gifter sig. In 1937, she decided to leave the Bonnier publishing company. Instead she joined the Tidens publisher which was owned by the Swedish Social Democratic Party. Martinson decided to leave because she had been having disagreements with Tor Bonnier (1883-1976) since 1934. He was one of the Bonnier-founder's two grandsons who jointly ran the company at the time. Her choice of Tidens was also partly due to political reasons. Starting with a collection of poems called Motsols ("Counterclockwise"), Martinson's works were now published by Tidens. She had been working on Motsols for ten years. It consisted of poems about politics, love and nature.

During the 1930s, Martinson experienced severe stomach pains. Despite several diagnoses made by different doctors, no remedy could be found and the pain continued. In June 1937, she was hospitalized at the Södertälje hospital where it was discovered that buckshots had accumulated in her appendix. (Note: It is not uncommon for people with a diet consisting of small game, like birds and deer, killed with shotguns, to accidentally ingest undetected buckshots with the meat. Some of the pellets may become lodged in the appendix. If they are made of lead, they can cause lead poisoning.) She had an operation on 16 June and during her stay at the hospital, she and Harry kept in contact through letters. Harry's were love letters, while Martinson still found it difficult to trust him after his extramarital affairs. Her letters were not as affectionate as his and their relationship was crumbling. On 8 February 1939, Harry experienced pain in one of his knees and was hospitalized. He stayed in the hospital during spring and was discharged on 13 June, after which he went to Stockholm and stayed with friends. He broke contact with Martinson and after Midsummer 1939, he filed for divorce and never returned to her or Johannesdal. They were granted legal separation on 4 March 1940, and divorced in 1941. By then Harry was already engaged to his second wife Ingrid Lagercrantz. They were married until Harry committed suicide on 11 February 1978 at the Karolinska University Hospital in Stockholm by cutting his stomach open with a pair of scissors in what has been described as a "hara-kiri-like manner", due to a depression following a controversy regarding the Nobel Prize in Literature he received in 1974.

The marriage between Martinson and Harry is recounted in the memoirs Tröskeln ("The Threshold") (1982) by their friend Swedish writer Ivar Lo-Johansson. She also relied on Lo-Johansson to deliver messages to Harry when he was out on his wanderings and his whereabouts were unknown to her.

== Later life and death ==
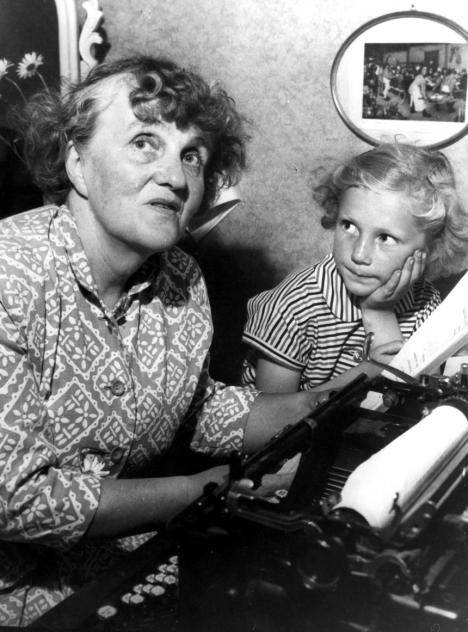
Moa Martinson in 1956

Over six years Martinson had published eight books and had gained most critics' respect. In September 1939, World War II broke out, which she saw as the biggest threat to the working class. In her opinion, the non-socialist ruling countries were sending out workers to fight for values they did not share. When it came to Soviet participation in the war, Martinson had a different opinion and believed that Russian workers were defending their revolution.

To make more money and avoid loneliness Martinson entered a new area, the film industry. She had help from her friend, actress Naima Wifstrand. Martinson wrote a lengthy screenplay that she sent to director Per Lindberg, who became interested. She proposed that they would contact AB Svensk Filmindustri (SF). However, Martinson's ambitions were too big and when she demanded an advance and an answer straight away, SF showed no interest.

In the autumn of 1942, she met Karl Gunnarsson, whom she had first encountered in 1910 when she worked as a pantry chef at the Elfkarleö Hotel, south of Gävle. Gunnarsson was a writer too and the meeting with him reminded Martinson of her youth during the 1910s and the move to Johannesdal. Her memories were given shape in a love novel called Den osynlige älskaren ("The Invisible Lover").

During the 1940s, Martinson became known in Sweden as "the Mother of the People". Her books were reaching a wide audience and she now had readers who could identify with the environment she was portraying, instead of people being shocked by her naturalistic scenes. She wrote diligently and had causerie and debate articles published in several daily and weekly papers. She was also frequently hired to give lectures and traveled the country on different tours. In 1944, she made her radio debut. Because of her strong personality, what she said and did caused attention, and she became a role model for many women in Sweden and most of all for women in the working class.

In November 1954, Martinson's mother Kristina Swartz died at the age of 83. Their relationship had been very strong, and Martinson's mother had been a big influence and inspiration for her work. In My Mother Gets Married, she characterized Swartz as her best and most trusted friend. At that time, Martinson's literary reputation was low as it had decreased throughout the years. When her health became worse in the 60s, she stopped writing. However, despite her low reputation as a writer, Martinson still meant a lot to working-class women. Even though her health was deteriorating, she still enjoyed debating and never stopped expressing her feelings.

On 5 August 1964, Martinson died at 73 years of age in Sorunda. She is buried at Sorunda Church.

== Legacy ==
During the 1970s, Martinson became a role model for female writers during the feminist movement in the Nordic countries. Earlier, during the 1960s, she had been labeled "the cheerful chronicler of misery" by Swedish author Erik Hjalmar Linder.

Paradoxically enough, I am mostly indignant not because I was denied the possibility to get a university education, but because I landed right in the same anonymous hell as my mother. Maybe it was even harder for me, for I was fully conscious that it was hell. I was clear about the injustice against all of us, and powerless.

— From foreword for My Mother Gets Married

In 1989, a literary award named after Martinson was instituted by the Workers' Educational Association (Arbetarnas bildningsförbund, ABF) and the Moa Martinson Society. The Moa Award (Moa-priset) is an annual prize awarded to a person who writes in the spirit of Martinson.

== Awards ==
- The Nine Society's Grand Prize, 1944

== Bibliography ==
Works by Martinson:

- Pigmamma ("Maid Mother"), serial (1928–29) SELIBR 3315883
- Kvinnor och äppelträd ("Women and Apple Trees"), novel (1933) SELIBR 1348792
- Sallys söner ("Sally's Sons"), novel (1934) SELIBR 1348794
- Rågvakt ("Rye Guard"), novel (1935) SELIBR 1348793
- Mor gifter sig ("My Mother Gets Married"), novel, Mia series (1936) SELIBR 1373038
- Drottning Grågyllen ("Queen Graygold"), historical novel (1937) SELIBR 1373035
- Motsols ("Counterclockwise"), poems (1937) SELIBR 1373039
- Kyrkbröllop ("Church Wedding"), novel Mia series (1938) SELIBR 1373037
- Kungens rosor ("The King's Roses"), novel Mia series (1939) SELIBR 1373036
- Vägen under stjärnorna ("The Road Under The Stars"), historical novel (1940) SELIBR 1373040
- Brandliljor ("Fire Lilies"), historical novel (1941) SELIBR 2183016
- Armén vid horisonten ("The Army on the Horizon"), essays and short stories (1942) SELIBR 442305
- Den osynliga älskaren ("The Invisible Lover"), Betty series (1943) SELIBR 2900621
- Bakom svenskvallen ("Behind the Swedish Wall"), memoirs (1944) SELIBR 442304
- Kärlek mellan krigen ("Love Between Wars"), memoirs (1947) SELIBR 2900619
- Livets fest ("Life's Feast"), historical novel (1949) SELIBR 2900620
- Jag möter en diktare ("I Meet a Poet"), memoirs (1950) SELIBR 3057748
- Du är den enda ("You are The One"), Betty series (1952) SELIBR 8080449
- Kvinnorna på Kummelsjö ("The Women at Kummelsjö"), historical novel (1955) SELIBR 442307
- Klockor vid sidenvägen ("Bells at the Silk Road"), Betty series (1957) SELIBR 8080448
- Hemligheten ("The Secret"), Betty series (1959) SELIBR 442306

== Adaptations ==
=== Films ===
- (1974) Rågvakt, film for television, based on the novel with the same name, directed by Göran Bohman, starring Christina Evers
- (1986) Moa, biographical film directed by Anders Wahlgren, with Gunilla Nyroos in the title role

=== Television series ===
- (1979) Mor gifter sig, based on the novel with the same name, directed by Per Sjöstrand and starring Gurie Nordwall, Hans Wigren and Nina Ullerstam
