= Johan Tirén =

Swedish painter (1853–1911)

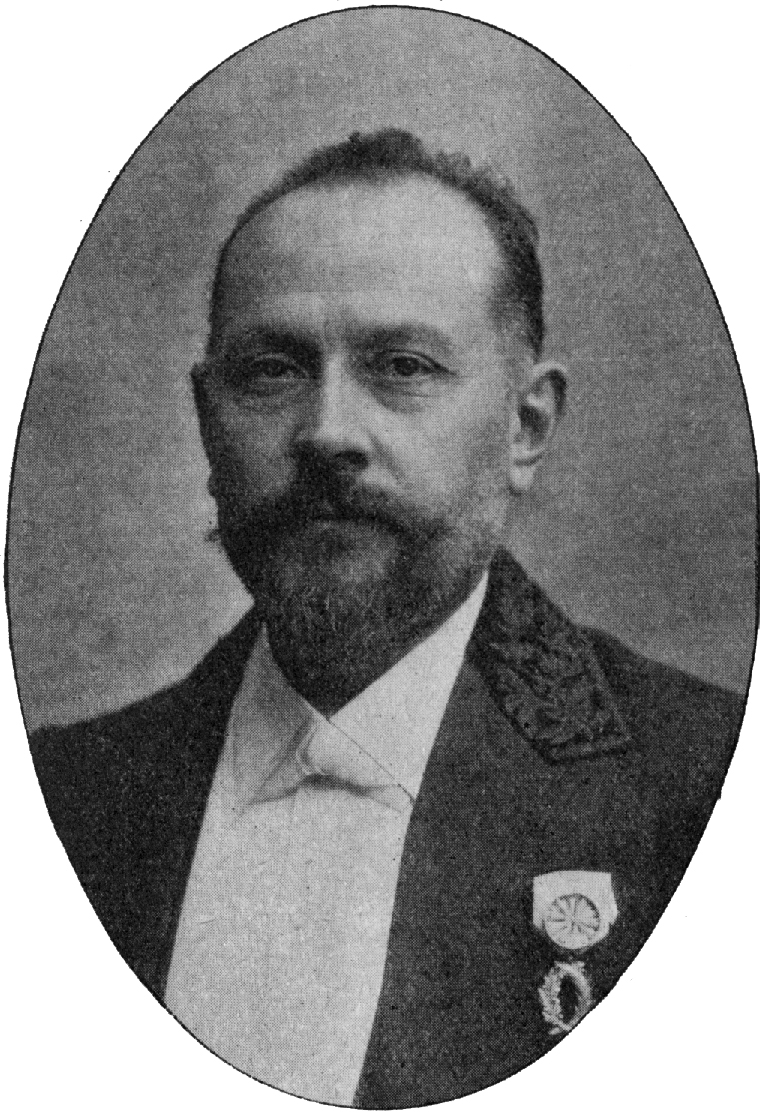
Johan Tirén

Johan Tirén (12 October 1853, Själevad - 24 August 1911, Länna Parish, Uppland) was a Swedish painter who specialized in scenes of the rural life in Northern Sweden.

== Biography ==
He was the older brother of the artist, Karl Tirén. At the age of seven, his family moved to Oviken in Jämtland, where his father served as the Vicar. He originally attended the Tekniska skolan in Stockholm then spent the years 1877 to 1880 at the Royal Swedish Academy of Fine Arts, where he won a Royal Medal in 1880 for his painting of Loki imprisoned by Æsir. He first came to public attention when his painting, "A Jämtland Legend" was displayed at the Academy. His fellow student, Anders Zorn, sat as the model for the näck (water spirit).

After studying in Norrland in 1881, he was able to obtain a scholarship and used it to make a study trip; visiting the Netherlands, Belgium, Paris and Upper Bavaria. While in Rome, he received orders from the Academy Director to begin studies in Munich. Instead, after spending the summer in Denmark, he returned to Paris and studied with Jean-Léon Gérôme, but found himself uninspired to paint by what he saw there. When his travel allowance was not extended, he settled in Jämtland, where he painted landscapes and scenes from the lives of the Sami people.

In 1884, he married the painter Gerda Rydberg. Their children, Nils and Stina also became artists.

He became deeply involved in the issue of rights for the Sami and, in 1892, painted a controversial scene showing them with some of their reindeer that had been shot by a farmer. It was inspired by a real incident involving a landowner named William Farup of Ljusnedal who had instigated the slaughtering of reindeer belonging to the Sami so the area could be developed.

The logo for Friluftsfrämjandet, a non-profit promoter of outdoor recreation, is based on his painting, "The Skiing Lapp" from 1900.

== Selected paintings ==
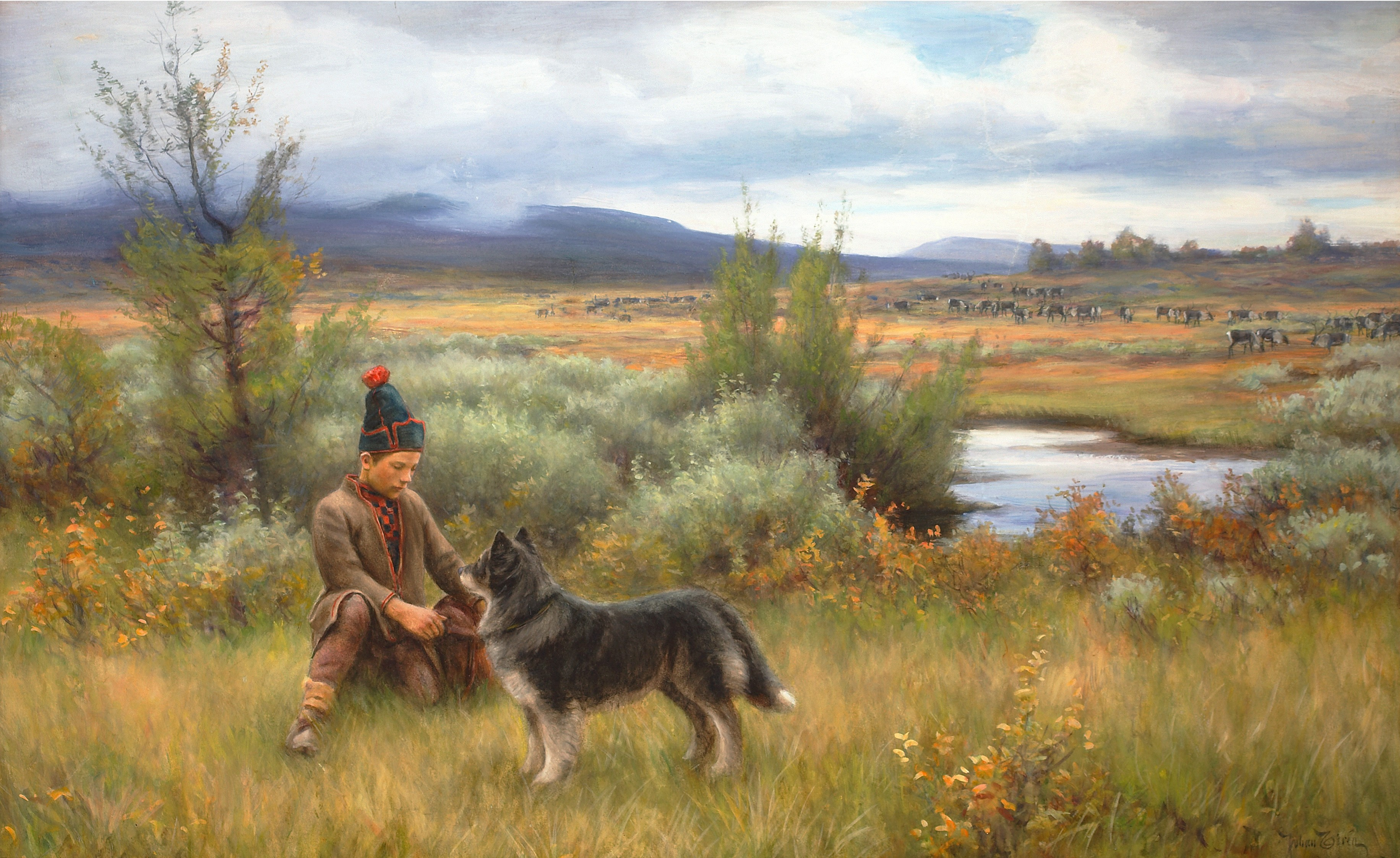
Sami boy playing with his dog

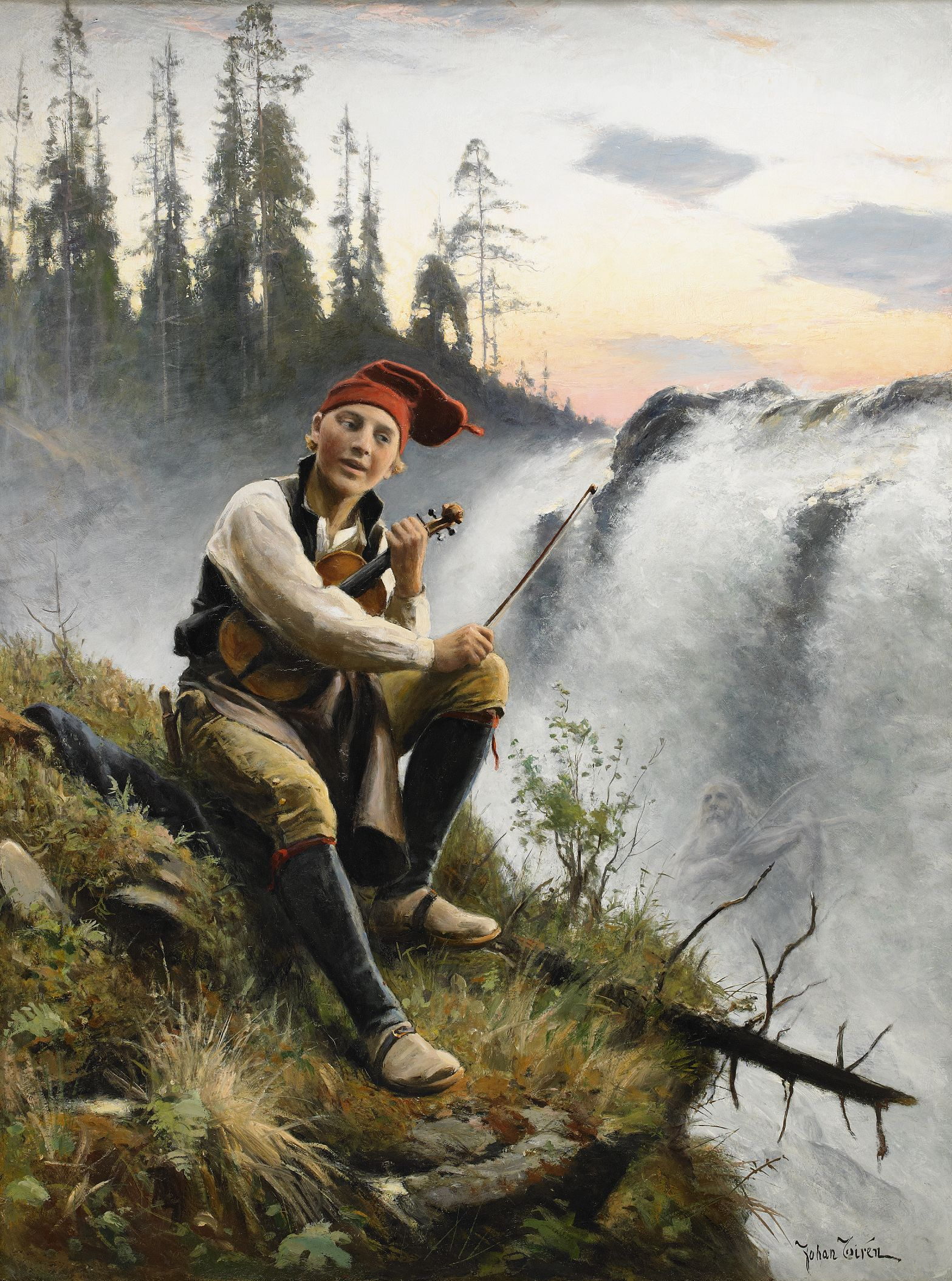
A Jämtland legend

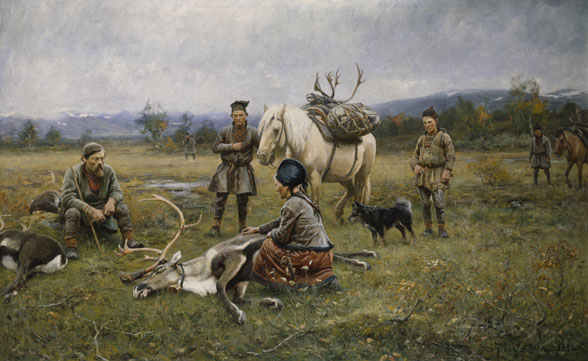
Sami with reindeer that have been shot, 1892

== Other sources ==
- Tirén, Johan i Svenskt biografiskt handlexikon, 1906
- Biography from the Nordisk familjebok @ Project Runeberg
- Johan Tirén i Nationalencyklopedin
