= Carl Bergsten =

Swedish architect

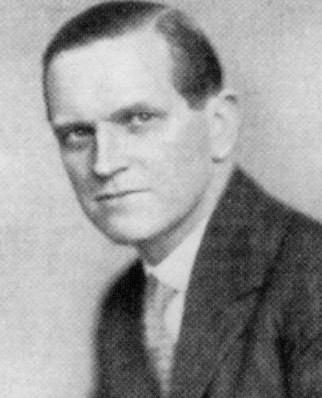

Carl Gustaf Bergsten (10 May 1879 in Norrköping - 22 April 1935 in Stockholm) was a Swedish architect. He graduated in 1901 from the KTH Royal Institute of Technology and three years later from the Royal Swedish Academy of Fine Arts in Stockholm. A scholarship took him to Germany and to Vienna. He apprenticed with architects Isak Gustaf Clason and Erik Lallerstedt. Bergsten ran his own architectural firm from 1904 to 1935. He was influenced by the National Romantic style and Functionalism. He designed a number of exhibition spaces including Liljevalchs konsthall. For the Norrköping Exhibition of Art and Industry in 1906, Bergsten designed the exhibition's two main buildings the Industrial Hall (Industrihallen) and the Art Exhibition Hall (Konsthallen) as well as the Hunting Pavilion (Jaktpaviljongen).

== Selected works ==
- Norrköping Exhibition of Art and Industry (1906)
- Liljevalchs konsthall (1916)
- Swedish Pavilion International Exhibition of Modern Decorative and Industrial Arts in Paris (1925)
- Metropolitan Museum of Art, Exhibition of Swedish Contemporary Decorative Arts, installation design (1927)
- Gothenburg City Theatre (1934)
