= Nabot Törnros =

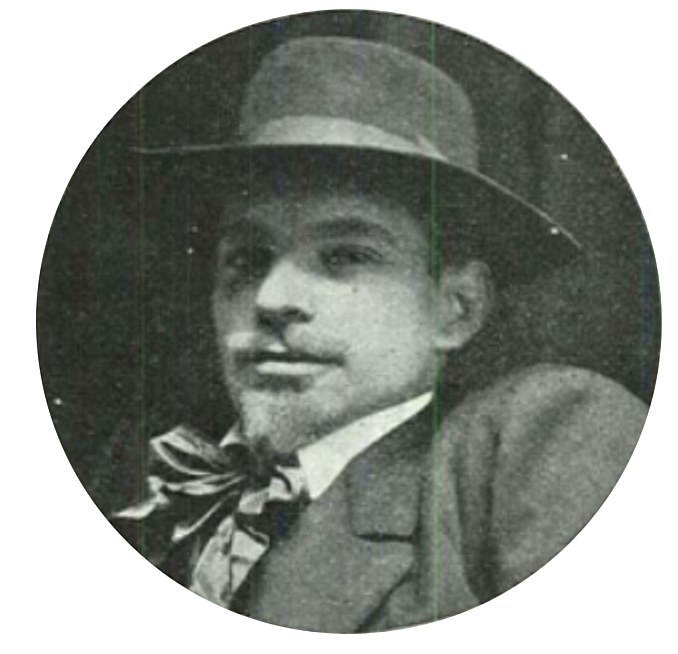
Nabot Törnros (1908)

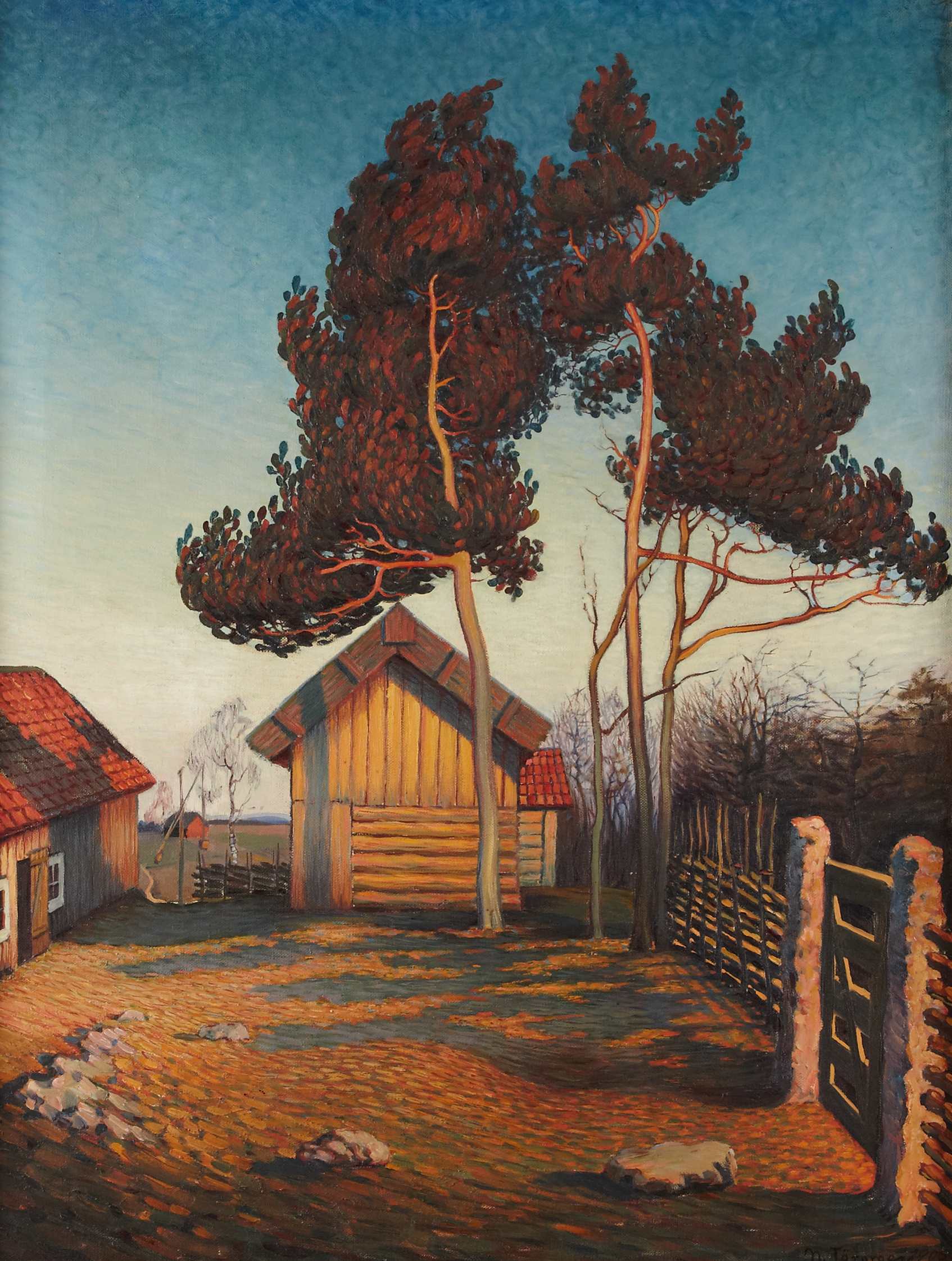
Gårdsmotiv med tallar (Courtyard with Pines) (1900)

Johan Natanael Törnros, known as Nabot (2 June 1878, Stockholm – by 1914, Hjo?) was a Swedish painter, illustrator and cartoonist. He specialized in portraits and interiors. After 1900, he was a member of a short-lived progressive artists' group known as "De Frie", which was notable for its inclusion of a female artist, Harriet Sundström. His nickname is derived from the French word for dwarf.

== Biography ==
He studied art with Anders Zorn, Richard Bergh and Per Hasselberg at the Konstnärsförbundets skola (Artists' Association School) in Stockholm. From about 1898 he was a member of the Konstnärsförbundet, but left the organization sometime around 1900 due to differing views about the future direction of the arts. He was primarily known for his technical expertise, which made him much in demand for accurate portraits and interior studies.

As a dwarf, contemporary cultural attitudes made him a unique personality. His sufferings enabled him to have great empathy for other people's feelings which, in turn, created interest in his art and enabled him to make professional connections easily.

He participated in the Yngre konstnärers (Young Artists) exhibition in Stockholm in 1899 and in exhibitions held by the Konstnärsförbundet in 1899 and 1900. He also was among those representing Sweden at the Exposition Universelle (1900). Other exhibitions included Svensk konst (Swedish Art) at Helsingborg in 1903, the Norrköping Exhibition of Art and Industry (1906), the Industri och konstutställningen in Lund (1907) and a showing by members of De Frei at the Hallins konsthandel.

Together with Einar von Strokirch and Jacob Sandberg, he exhibited at Hjo in 1913. A memorial retrospective was held in Stockholm in 1918. Some of his works are held by the Nationalmuseum.
