= Norrköping Exhibition of Art and Industry =

Swedish exhibition in 1906

Coordinates: 58°35′30″N 16°12′27″E

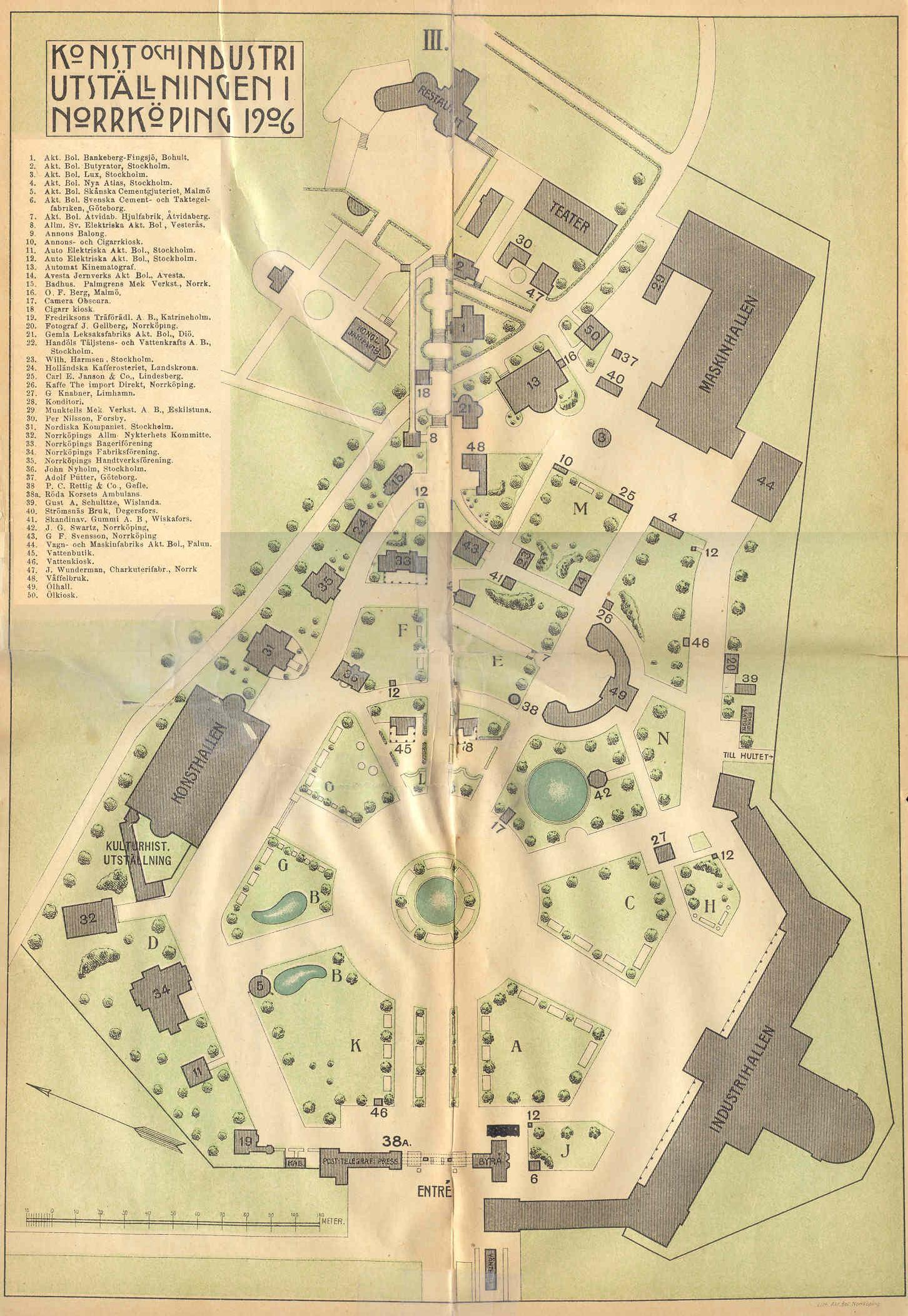
Map of the area of the exhibition

Norrköping Exhibition of Art and Industry (Swedish: Konst- och industriutställningen i Norrköping) was an exhibition in Norrköping, Sweden in 1906.

At the initiative of the local industrial association Norrköpings Fabriksförening och Handtverksförening it was decided an art and industrial exhibition should be held in Norrköping between June 1 – September 15, 1906. The exhibition was opened by the Crown Prince Gustaf and was mostly held at the area south of the Sylten neighbourhood. The architect Carl Bergsten designed the exhibition's two main buildings the Industrihallen (industrial hall) that was 7,500 m^{2} (81,000 sq ft) with places for 630 exhibitors, and the Konsthallen (art exhibition hall). He also designed the Jaktpaviljongen (hunting pavilion). Werner Northun designed the Maskinhallen (engines hall) at a total of 3,600 m^{2} (39,000 sq ft), as well as the main restaurant seating 400 people and the Thaliatemplet theatre (500 folding chairs).

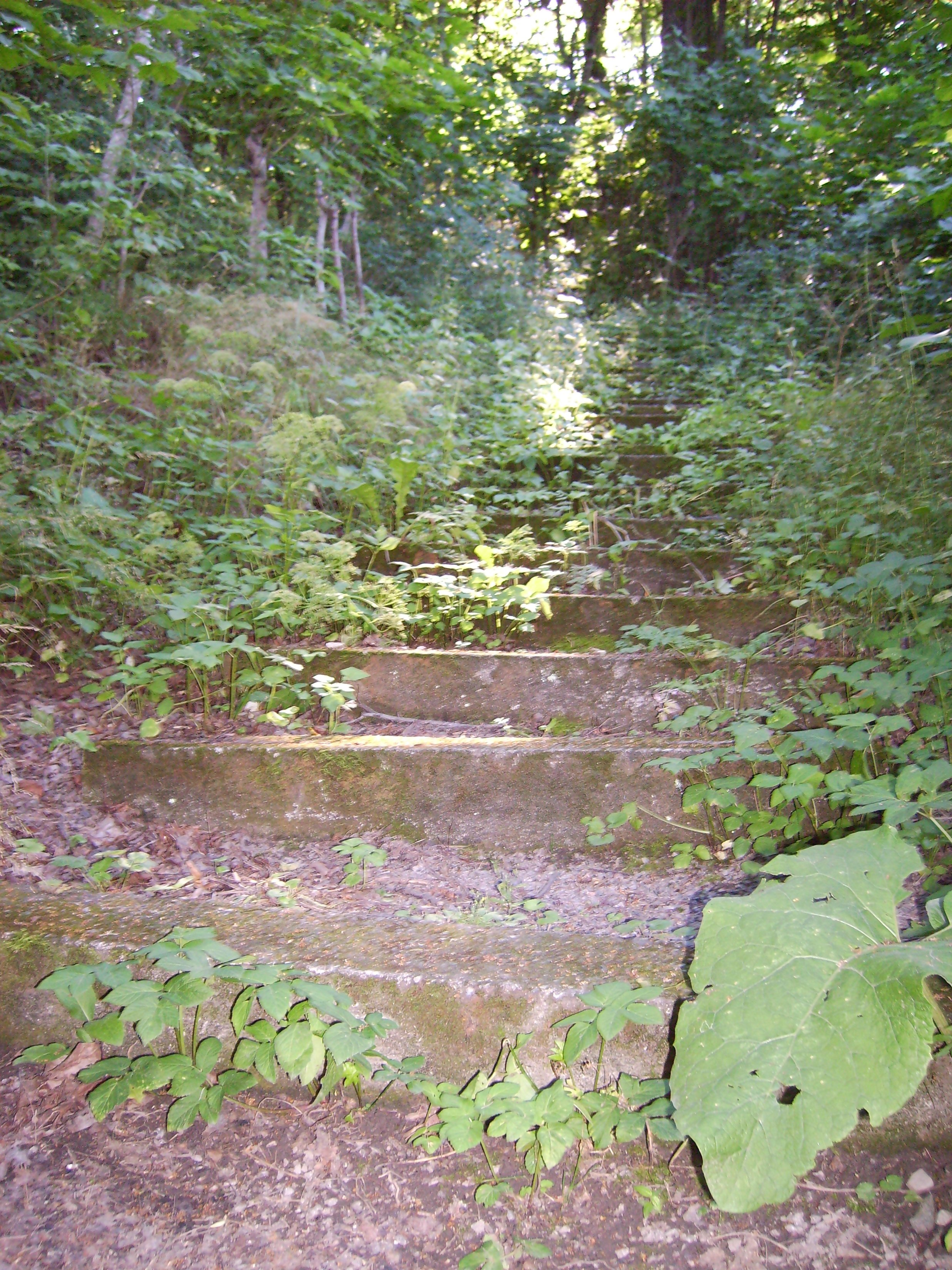
The "Moa Martinson Stairs" at Sylten, 80 steps.

== Art exhibition ==
The cultural parts of the 1906 exhibition attracted huge attention when over 900 pieces of art were shown in 15 different rooms. Artists included Anna Ancher, Michael Ancher, Ivar Arosenius, Oscar Björk, John Bauer, Prince Eugen, Peder Severin Krøyer, Carl Larsson, Birger Palme, Georg Pauli, Hanna Pauli, Georg von Rosen, David Wallin, Nabot Törnros and Anders Zorn.

== Moa Martinson ==
At the main restaurant Moa Martinson, who later became an author, worked as a pantry chef. Moa's Stairs with 80 steps are still visible. In her book Kungens rosor ("The King's Roses") Martinson tells about her work at the restaurant.
