= Konstnärshuset =

Building in Stockholm, Sweden

Coordinates: 59°20′1.1″N 18°4′28.03″E

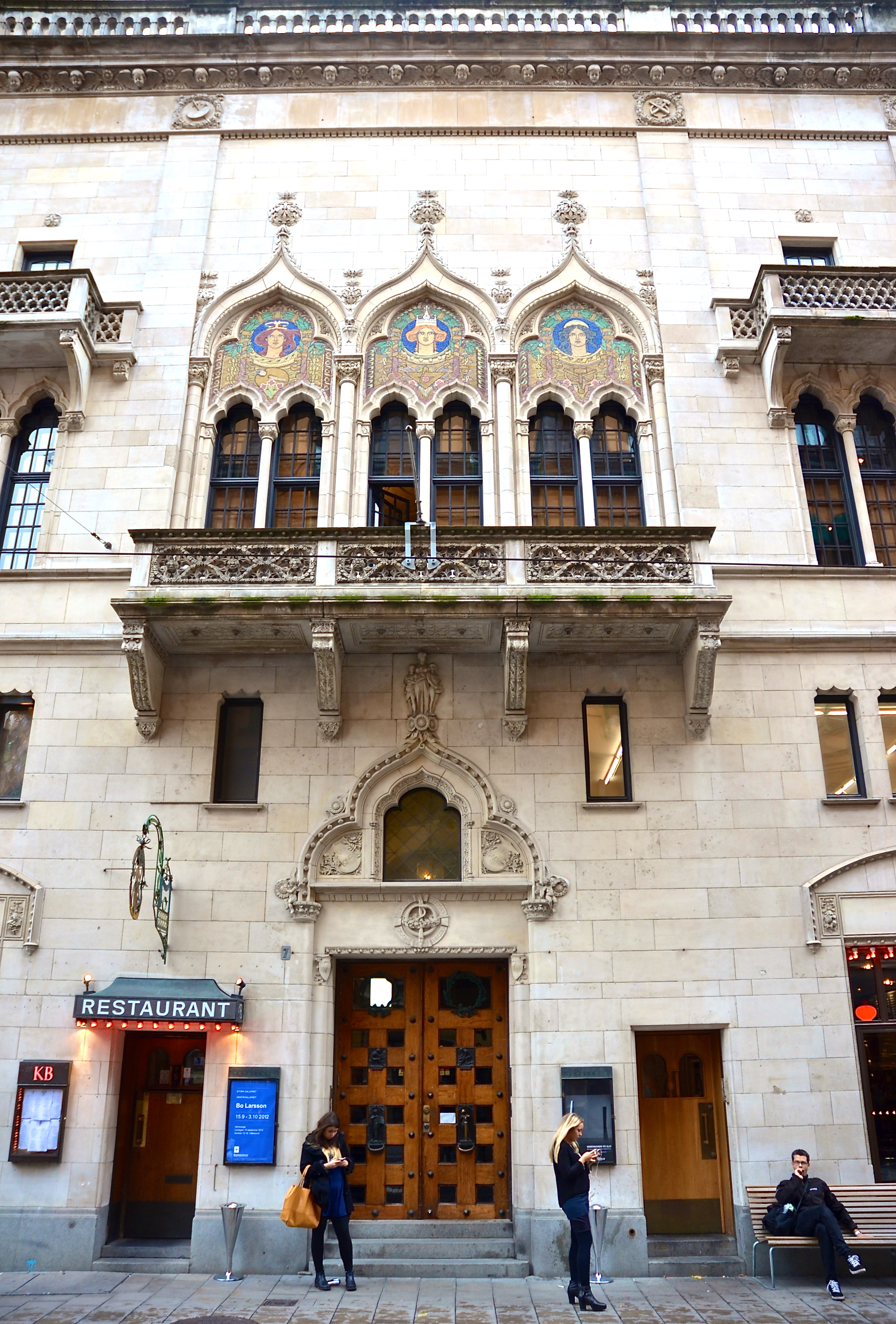
Konstnärhuset, Stockholm

Konstnärshuset (literally Artists' House) is a building in central Stockholm, Sweden. It is owned by the Swedish Artists Association (Svenska konstnärernas förening) and is used as an art gallery.

== History ==
Designed by Ludvig Petersen, the building was completed in 1898 and inaugurated on January 7, 1899. The restaurant Konstnärsbaren was restored in 1931, under the design of architect Björn Hedvall (1889-1982). The restaurant consists of a dining room, a bar, and a banqueting hall decorated with wall paintings from the renovation in 1931.

Carl Larsson (1853–1919) was the first chairman of the Artists Association which owns the building.

The facade overlooking the street is finished in Portland limestone with intricate details, including wall openings, a crowning balustrade, clover-leafed windows and mosaics. The architecture is inspired by Italian and Spanish trends from the 16th century. The interior includes the entrance hall, a staircase and the richly stuccoed exhibition hall. The building houses a collection of fine art. The entire building is decorated by the works of celebrated artists and craftsmen. The small reliefs on the front doors were created by the painter, Gustaf Theodor Wallén.

== See also ==
- Architecture of Stockholm

== Other sources ==
- Dag Widman: (1999) Konstnärernas hus - en mötesplats under 100 år (Byggförlaget, Stockholm) ISBN 91-7988-174-2
