= List of Swedish-language novels translated into English =

This is a list of Swedish-language novels translated into English.

== List ==
Swedish title	Author	Year	English title	Translator	Year
Gösta Berlings saga	Selma Lagerlöf	1891	Gösta Berling's Saga	Lillie Tudeer	1894
Gösta Berlings saga	Selma Lagerlöf	1891	The Story of Gösta Berling	Pauline Bancroft Flach	1898
Gösta Berlings saga	Selma Lagerlöf	1891	The Story of Gosta Berling	Robert Bly	1962
Gösta Berlings saga	Selma Lagerlöf	1891		Paul Norlen	2009
Jerusalem	Selma Lagerlöf	1901	Jerusalem	Velma Swanston Howard	1915
Herr Arnes penningar	Selma Lagerlöf	1904	Herr Arne’s Hoard	Arthur G. Chater	1923
Herr Arnes penningar	Selma Lagerlöf	1904	The Treasure	Arthur G. Chater	1925
Doktor Glas	Hjalmar Söderberg	1905	Doctor Glas	Paul Britten Austin	1963
Nils Holgerssons underbara resa genom Sverige	Selma Lagerlöf	1906	The Wonderful Adventures of Nils	Velma Swanston Howard	
Den allvarsamma leken	Hjalmar Söderberg	1912	The Serious Game	Eva Claeson	2001
Kejsaren av Portugallien	Selma Lagerlöf	1914	The Emperor of Portugallia	Velma Swanston Howard	1916
Löwensköldska ringen	Selma Lagerlöf	1925	The Löwensköld Ring	Francesca Martin	1928
Nässlorna blomma	Harry Martinson	1935	Flowering Nettle	Naomi Walford	1936
Röde Orm	Frans G. Bengtsson	1941	Red Orm	Barrows Mussey	1943
Röde Orm	Frans G. Bengtsson	1941	The Long Ships	Michael Meyer	1954
Dvärgen	Pär Lagerkvist	1944	The Dwarf	Alexandra Dick	1945
Utvandrarna	Vilhelm Moberg	1949	The Emigrants	Gustaf Lannestock	1951
Invandrarna	Vilhelm Moberg	1952	Unto a Good Land	Gustaf Lannestock	1954
Nybyggarna	Vilhelm Moberg	1956	The Settlers	Gustaf Lannestock	1961
Sista brevet till Sverige	Vilhelm Moberg	1959	The Last Letter Home	Gustaf Lannestock	1961
Hans nådes tid	Eyvind Johnson	1960	The Days of His Grace	Elspeth Harley Schubert	1968
Mina drömmars stad	Per Anders Fogelström	1960	City of My Dreams	Jennifer Brown Bäverstam	2000
Barn av sin stad	Per Anders Fogelström	1962	Children of Their City	Jennifer Brown Bäverstam	
Din stund på jorden	Vilhelm Moberg	1963	A Time on Earth	Naomi Walford	1965
Minns du den stad	Per Anders Fogelström	1964	Remember the City	Jennifer Brown Bäverstam	
I en förvandlad stad	Per Anders Fogelström	1966	In a City Transformed	Jennifer Brown Bäverstam	
Gentlemen	Klas Östergren	1980	Gentlemen	Tiina Nunnally	2007
Ormens väg på hälleberget	Torgny Lindgren	1982	The Way of a Serpent	Tom Geddes	
Juloratoriet	Göran Tunström	1983	The Christmas Oratorio	Paul Hoover (poet)	1995
Berts dagbok	Anders Jacobsson and Sören Olsson	1987	In Ned’s Head	Kevin Read	2001
Händelser vid vatten	Kerstin Ekman	1993	Blackwater	Joan Tate	1996
Gangsters	Klas Östergren	2005	Gangsters	Tiina Nunnally	2009
Orkanpartyt	Klas Östergren	2007	The Hurricane Party	Tiina Nunnally	2009
Hundraåringen som klev ut genom fönstret och försvann	Jonas Jonasson	2009	The Hundred-Year-Old Man Who Climbed Out the Window and Disappeared	Rod Bradbury	2012

== See also ==
- List of Swedish-language novels
