= Geriatric horse =

Characteristics and care of old horses

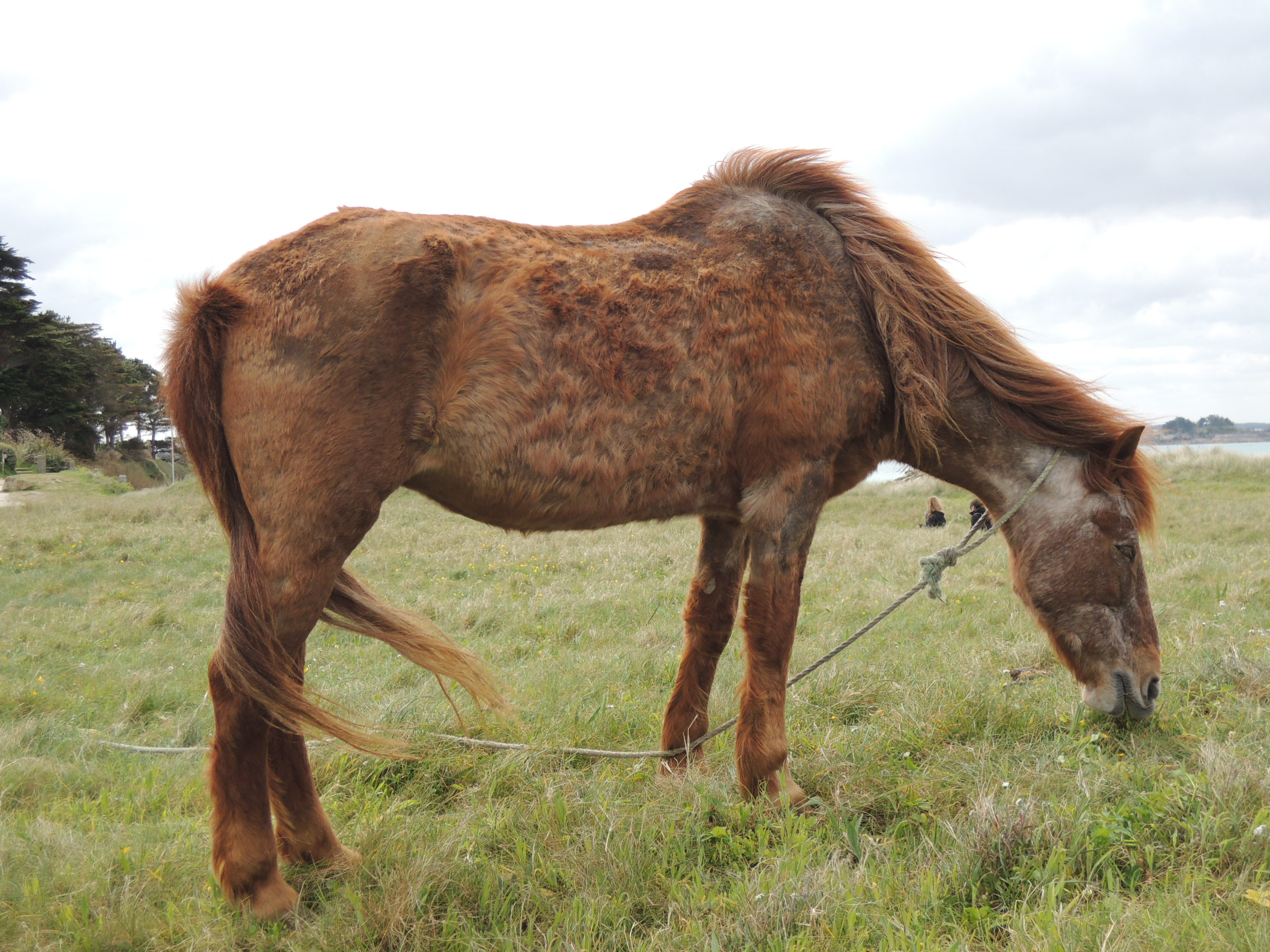
Horse showing many geriatric signs, including white hair on head, shaggy coat and arched back.

A geriatric horse is an equine that may show signs of physical and mental decline, which generally limits its ability to participate in most equestrian activities. The age at which a horse is considered geriatric can vary by breed and intended use, with older age being reached more quickly in Thoroughbred sport horses than in more robust ponies. Common signs of geriatric horses include dental changes, graying of certain areas on the head, a pronounced arch in the back, and stiffness in movement. Additionally, these animals may become more sensitive to seasonal changes.

From the 18th and 19th centuries onward, the practice of hippophagy, or horse meat consumption, became less restricted by religious prohibitions in Europe, leading to older horses being sold to knackers or slaughtered for their meat. As horses have increasingly gained the status of pets, alternative retirement options have emerged for them at the end of their lives. Such retirements are now more common, and geriatric horses can often be engaged in gentle activities, such as leisure riding. However, geriatric horses can present economic and ethical challenges, as owners may not always anticipate the longevity of their animals or the long-term costs associated with their care. This situation may contribute to concerns about fraud and ethical practices related to the resale of horses for slaughter.

== Longevity ==
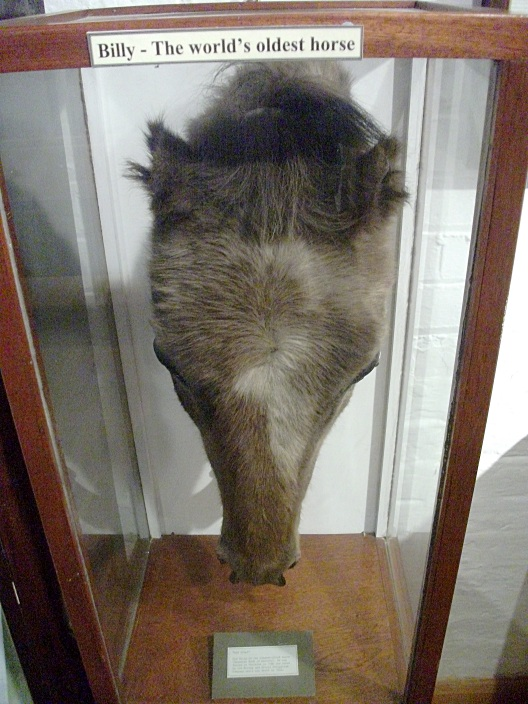
Taxidermized head of Old Billy, the world's oldest horse, at the Manchester Museum

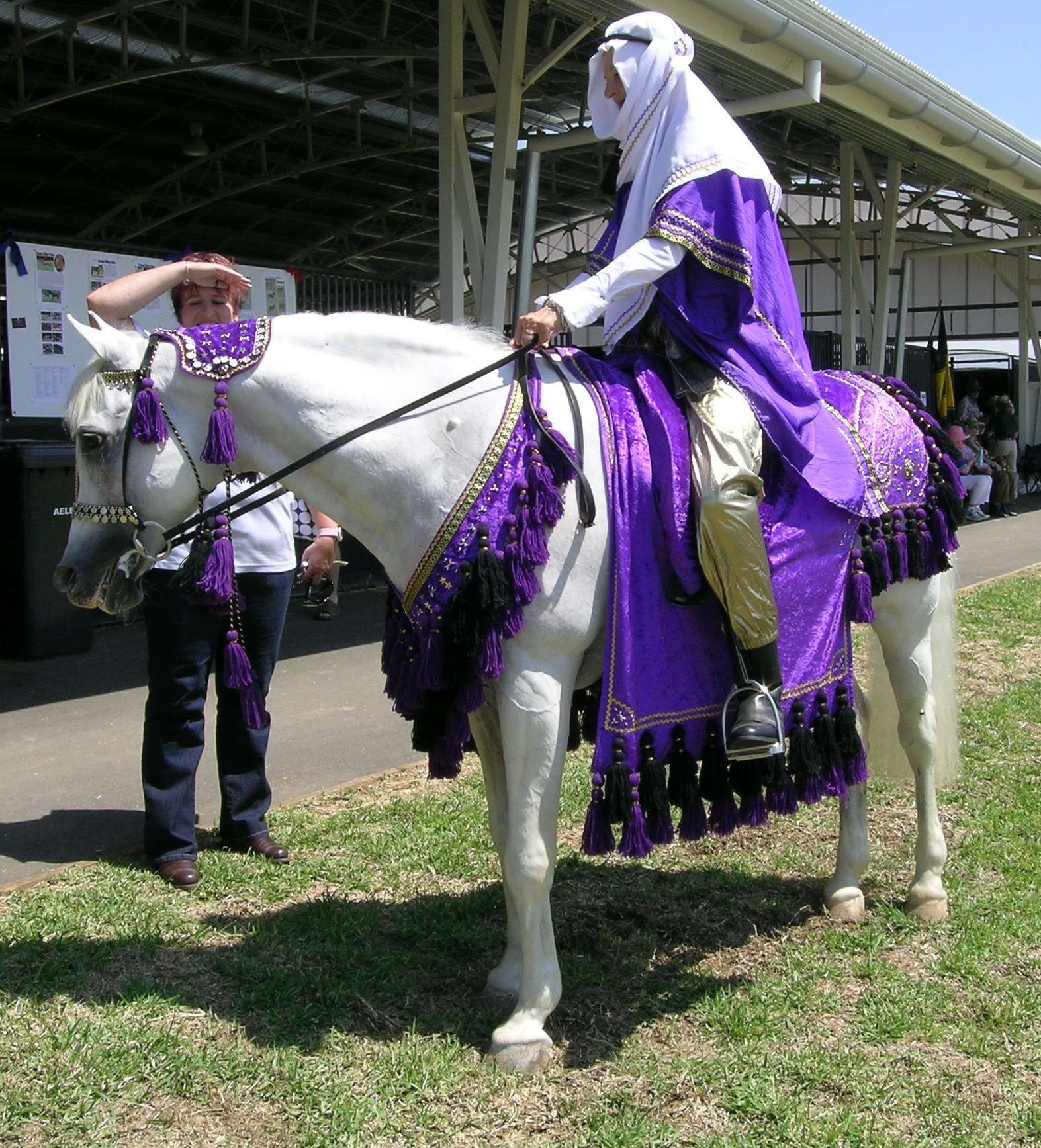
This Arabian stallion is 28-years-old.

The life expectancy of domesticated horses has increased due to improved management of their diet and care, as well as a growing bond between humans and these animals. The average lifespan of a horse tends to range from 25 to 30 years, with variations based on breed and purpose. Ponies generally have a longer lifespan than horses, often exceeding 30 years. Draft horses, as well as Arabian and Iberian breeds, tend to live significantly longer than trotters and Thoroughbreds.

Pierre Enoff suggests that horses can live up to 50 years in the wild; however, this assertion is contradicted by studies of prehistoric equine remains, which indicate that wild horses typically did not exceed ages of 15 to 20 years. Wild horses face various challenges that contribute to higher mortality rates, including scarcity of food and water, as well as predation.

The oldest known horse, Old Billy (1760-1822), lived to the age of 62 and gained significant attention in Manchester. He was a working horse of the Shire/Cob type. Longevity records for horses include individuals reaching 37 years, such as Bayou, a French horse of unknown origin; 42 years, exemplified by Tango Duke (1935–1978), an Australian Thoroughbred; and 51 years, as seen in Badger, a Welsh/Arabian cross (1953–2004), and Shayne, an Irish Trait (1962–2013). The record for ponies belongs to Sancho, another Welsh/Arabian cross, who died at the age of 54 in 2003, previously held by Steady Teddy, an American pony who lived to 53.

The age of death is a subjective measure influenced by various factors, including diet, genetic inheritance, care, and environment. In 2000, experts suggested that the age defining a ‘geriatric horse’ could be 16, 18, or 20 years. William Martin-Rosset notes that after three years, a horse's age can be multiplied by three to approximate its human equivalent; thus, a 20-year-old horse would be roughly equivalent to a 60-year-old human. Historically, horses were often considered ‘geriatric’ after 15 years; however, it is now common for horses over this age to remain actively working. Although establishing a precise age for geriatric classification is challenging, veterinarians indicate that around 70% of horses over 20 require special care. Exceptions exist, as some horses aged 25 and older can still be ridden and maintained like younger horses. The classification of a geriatric horse is more closely linked to health issues, such as osteoarthritis, and observable signs of aging rather than to age alone. Remarkably, some geriatric horses can still compete at high levels in selective events; for instance, Nobby became the world endurance champion at the age of 16.

== Signs of geriatric horses ==
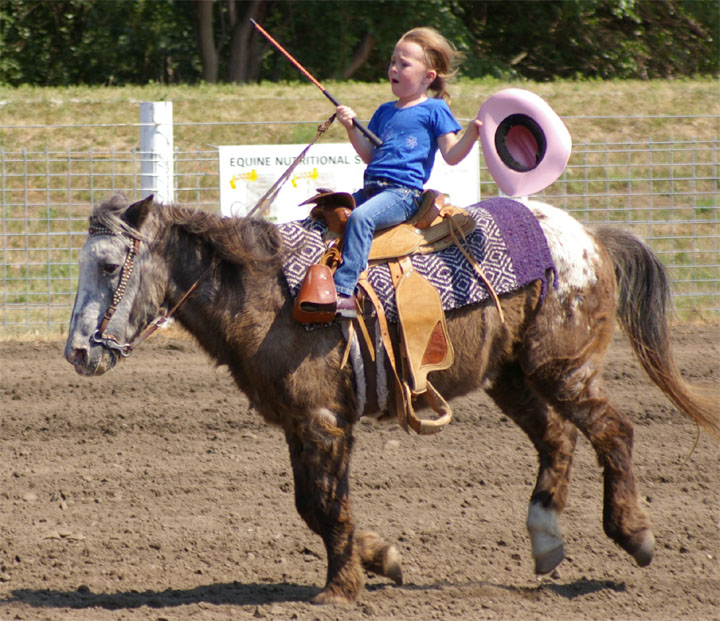
Geriatric pony with a lot of white hair on its head

There are several unmistakable signs that indicate a horse may be geriatric. Historically, determining a horse's age through observation was crucial, especially during a time when horses played a vital role in daily life. For example, Le Nouveau Parfait Maréchal (18th century) advised observing specific features such as the teeth, tail, forelock (which becomes hollow in older horses), lower jaw (more pronounced in geriatric horses), and the appearance of white eyebrow hairs, among other characteristics. Traditionally, horses between the ages of 5 and 8 were valued the most, with their worth typically decreasing after 8 years. The presence of a nearly white coat color, which is uncommon in younger horses, served as an indicator of an age exceeding 8 years.

As horses age, certain physical changes become apparent: the back tends to arch, withers, and pelvic bones become more prominent, and movement becomes stiffer. Signs of geriatric status may include poor physical condition (such as thinness or a rounded belly), loss of muscle mass, and very sloping pasterns due to the aging of tendons and ligaments. The changes extend beyond the physical; older horses often exhibit altered eating habits and may become indifferent to their environment and social interactions, including interactions with humans. Their overall rhythm of life slows down, leading to increased sleep and energy conservation to cope with climate and disease. Most signs that impede a geriatric horse's performance typically emerge between the ages of 16 and 20, with a significant and frequent issue being a loss of locomotion, often indicative of osteoarthritis. In addition to visible signs, the decline in the horse's five senses and the deterioration of various organs, including the respiratory, digestive, and cardiovascular systems, are also notable concerns.

=== Mouth and teeth ===
The mouth and teeth of horses undergo notable changes with age. Canine teeth become dull, worn, and yellow due to the effects of biting. Additionally, teeth may appear longer and more pronounced around the gums, while incisors can tilt forward as they emerge almost horizontally from the mouth. The palate also becomes gaunt, and the grooves in the teeth fade in geriatric horses. Historically, it was believed that one could determine a horse's age by pulling back its lip and counting the creases, with the number of creases supposedly correlating to the horse's age. More reliably, the lower lip of geriatric horses tends to sag. Observing the teeth remains the most dependable method for assessing age in the absence of identification documents, giving rise to the expression, "don't look a gift horse in the mouth". However, estimating a horse's age based on its teeth becomes challenging once the horse exceeds 15 years of age.

=== Coat ===
Coat changes are another indicator of a horse's age. The presence of white hairs around the eyes, muzzle, and occasionally on the body—similar to the graying of human hair—can signal that a horse is geriatric. The texture of the coat may also become rougher. Notably, a dark horse exhibiting white eyebrow hairs is typically over 15 years old. Older horses may also display variations in the growth of their winter coat, such as growing it unusually abundantly, either early or slowly.

== Management ==
The management of older horses is increasingly relevant as the relationship between horses and humans evolves, particularly in Europe and the United States, where horses are often viewed as family leisure animals. Historically, reselling a horse for slaughter or exploiting it until it was no longer profitable did not raise significant ethical concerns, as the animal's value was primarily economic. However, since the 1990s, there has been a growing trend to offer retirement options for horses at the end of their working lives, either with their owners or in specialized retirement facilities. While it is challenging to quantify the population of older or retired horses, estimates from the University of Nevada in Reno, suggest that approximately 10% of the horse population in the United States is over 20 years old.

Like all horses, geriatric horses require access to plenty of water, pasture, shelter, and mineral supplements. However, they necessitate additional precautions that are sometimes overlooked. In particular, it is essential to monitor their diet and ensure they receive regular vaccinations, dental care—typically with a consultation from an equine dentist at least once a year—deworming, and appropriate farriery. According to American veterinarians, farriery can constitute 25% to 50% of annual costs. Maintaining social interactions with other horses is also important for their overall well-being, enabling them to live their later years in good condition. Geriatric horses often experience health challenges, including osteoarthritis, dental issues, and digestive problems. They become more sensitive to seasonal changes and may suffer significant weight loss as a result. Ensuring proper care and management for these animals is critical to maintaining their quality of life in their senior years.

=== Retirement ===
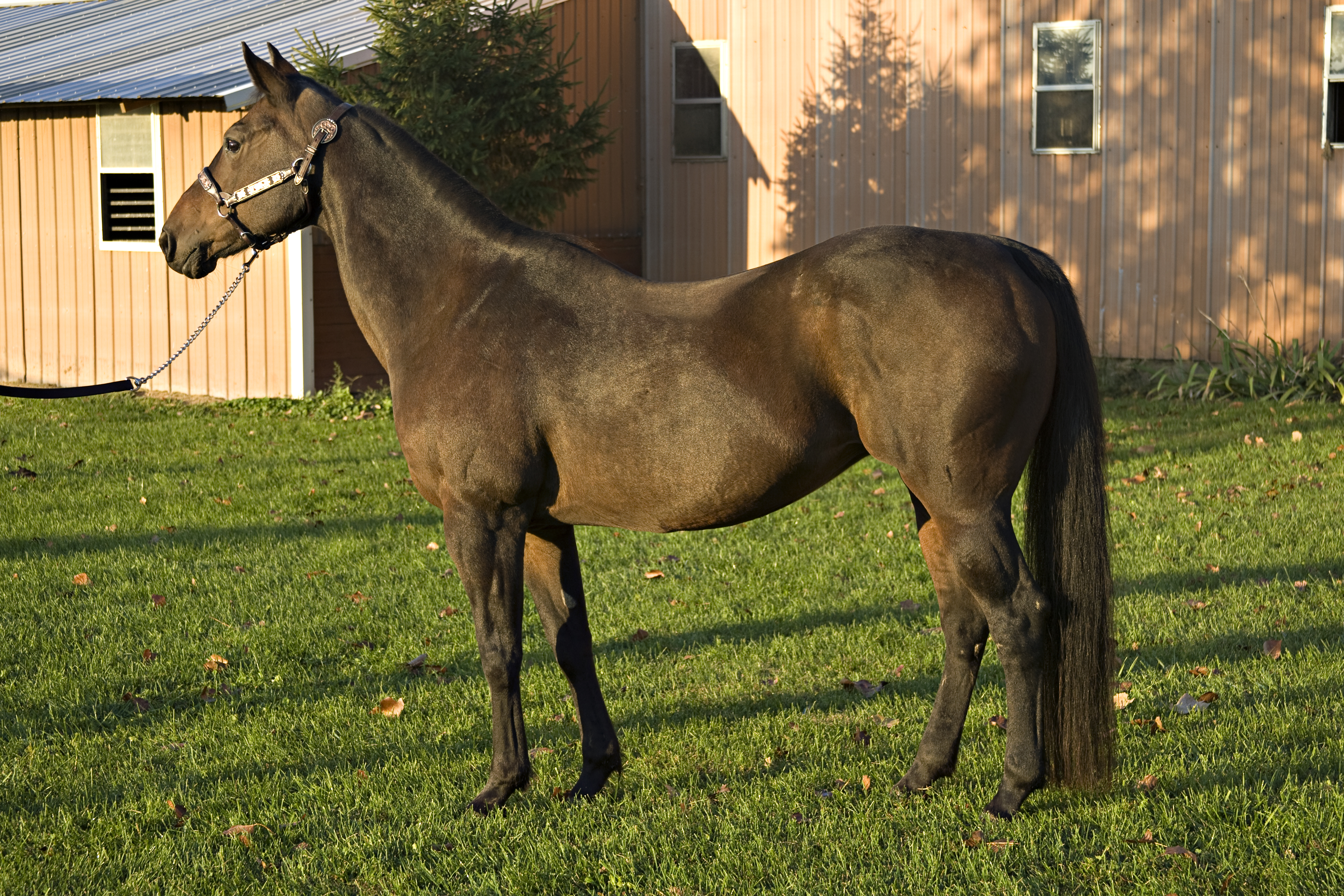
Saddling, arching of the back, affects geriatric horses that have been ridden and causes pain when ridden.

Horses are retired from a variety of activities, including riding schools, competitive sports (such as show jumping and dressage), showmanship, military service, and laboratory research. Racehorses often experience multiple career phases, as the racing industry is highly selective. A common solution for older horses is to limit their activities to recreational riding. In the United States, these horses are frequently kept within families to serve as mounts for children. Additionally, therapeutic riding centers in the U.S. often accept geriatric horses at no cost from private owners to assist individuals with disabilities. Some geriatric horses may be sent to riding schools to help teach beginners. However, there inevitably comes a point when these animals can no longer be ridden. Reduced activity can lead to muscle loss, which is exacerbated by aging. It is not advisable to leave older horses completely inactive, as this can weaken their muscles and skeletal structure. Furthermore, a sudden transition from intense physical activity to complete rest is detrimental; horses adapt better to gradual reductions in activity levels. Similarly, horses accustomed to living in stalls cannot quickly adjust to outdoor life without a transition period. Regular exercise is essential to keep geriatric horses active and engaged.

There are numerous accommodation centers for retired equines, analogous to "retirement homes" for horses. In France, one of the oldest and most renowned centers is Pech Petit, located in the Lot region, which was founded in July 1970 with the aim of sheltering geriatric horses that are at risk of being sent to slaughterhouses. Many similar organizations exist in countries such as Canada, Belgium and Switzerland. Some individuals may choose to retire their horses for economic reasons, family circumstances (such as divorce or death), or psychological reasons, as they may struggle with the prospect of witnessing their horse's decline and the eventual need for euthanasia. Consequently, boarding and retirement services for older horses are likely to expand in the coming years.

=== Feed ===
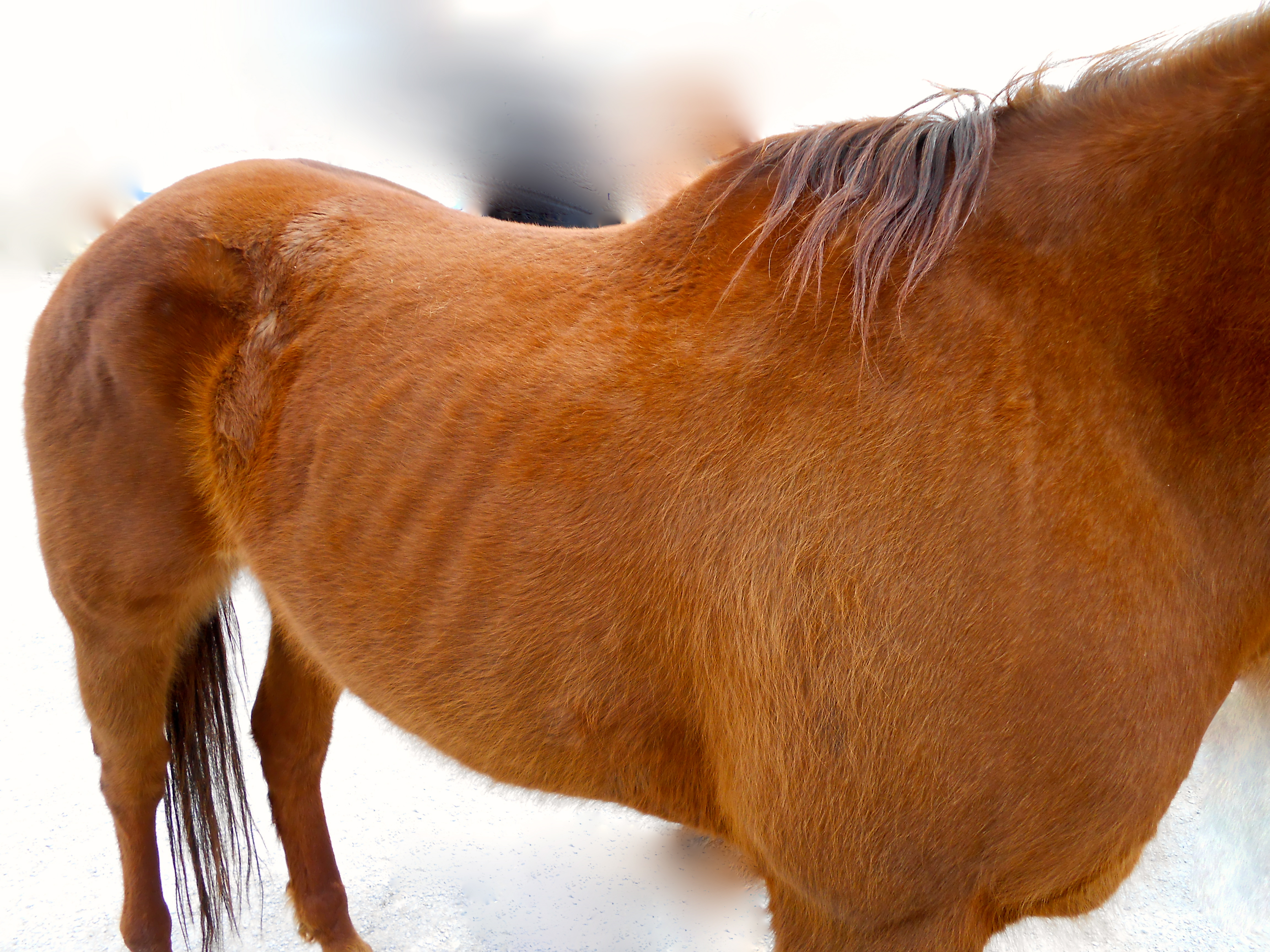
Skinny geriatric horse at the end of winter

A geriatric horse's diet should be well-balanced, easy to chew, and easily digestible. Recommended feed options include semi-dried silage, high-quality hay, wheat bran, linseed, flakes, or mueslis. High levels of fiber and straw are generally not advisable, nor should there be excessive amounts of alfalfa or apples, as these can have a laxative effect when consumed in large quantities. The Institut National de la Recherche Agronomique (National Institute of Agricultural Research, INRA) suggests a dry matter nitrogen content of 10–12%. Pasture alone is typically insufficient to meet the dietary needs of geriatric horses, necessitating the inclusion of supplements. Manufacturers are increasingly providing rations specifically formulated for geriatric horses, as their energy needs decline while their mineral requirements may increase. These horses may also experience reduced hunger and thirst.

Geriatric horses often face dental issues such as wear, malocclusion, and periodontitis, which can hinder their ability to chew properly. In such cases, hay should be chopped before feeding. Digestion can become less efficient, leading to slowed or even halted intestinal transit, which can be observed through changes in droppings. Geriatric horses may drink less frequently, which can result in dehydration in extreme cases. Additionally, if the liver and kidneys are impaired, urine may appear dark and foul-smelling.

Weight loss and loss of body fat are common in geriatric horses, which may necessitate larger quantities of feed or higher-quality rations. This weight loss can arise from various factors, including deficiencies, dental issues, lack of appetite, and digestive problems, ultimately increasing the risk of mortality. While it can be challenging to help a geriatric horse regain weight, one approach is to add vegetable fats, such as corn oil, to their feed. Conversely, there is also the risk of overfeeding inactive horses, which can lead to obesity and subsequent damage to their legs and hooves. This presents a challenge for owners, who may face unfounded suspicions of animal neglect in cases of weight loss.

=== Pasturing ===
In the context of group feeding, geriatric horses may struggle to assert themselves and could be denied access to food due to dominance issues with their pasture mates. It is recommended that geriatric horses be kept in pairs, provided they coexist harmoniously, rather than in larger herds. Pairs of geriatric horses often form strong bonds of companionship; however, if they are separated or if one horse passes away, the remaining horse may experience significant distress and a decline in health.

=== Health ===
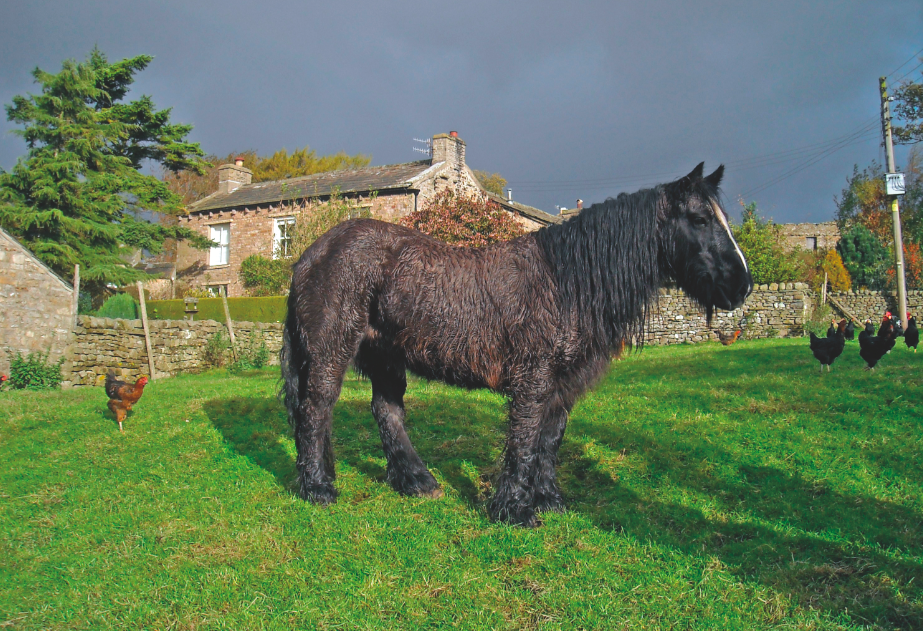
Shaggy horse with equine Cushing's disease

Cushing's disease is a common condition in geriatric horses, characterized by elevated levels of cortisone in the blood. Symptoms include a shaggy coat, excessive sweating, and increased urination. While there is no cure for Cushing's disease, it can be effectively managed. Another related condition, Equine Metabolic Syndrome (EMS), can lead to obesity and laminitis. Management strategies for EMS include carbohydrate restriction and increased exercise.

The risk of colic also increases with age, and geriatric horses are statistically more susceptible to surgical colic. Sustained activity, proper pasturing, and regular deworming can help mitigate this risk. Osteoarthritis, characterized by the deterioration of articular cartilage with periods of crisis and remission, is a significant source of pain and discomfort for geriatric horses, often leading to euthanasia. Aging affects the structure of cartilage and exacerbates the condition, particularly in the absence of appropriate hoof care. Pain relief can be achieved through anti-inflammatory medications, and it is advisable to walk and trot the horse to enhance muscle temperature and blood circulation. However, some very geriatric horses may become unable to stand or lie down independently.

Additionally, geriatric horses may suffer from osteoporosis and various eyesight issues, leading to increased special needs and a general decline in immune function. Injuries in these horses are more likely to result in infectious complications.

=== Mortality ===
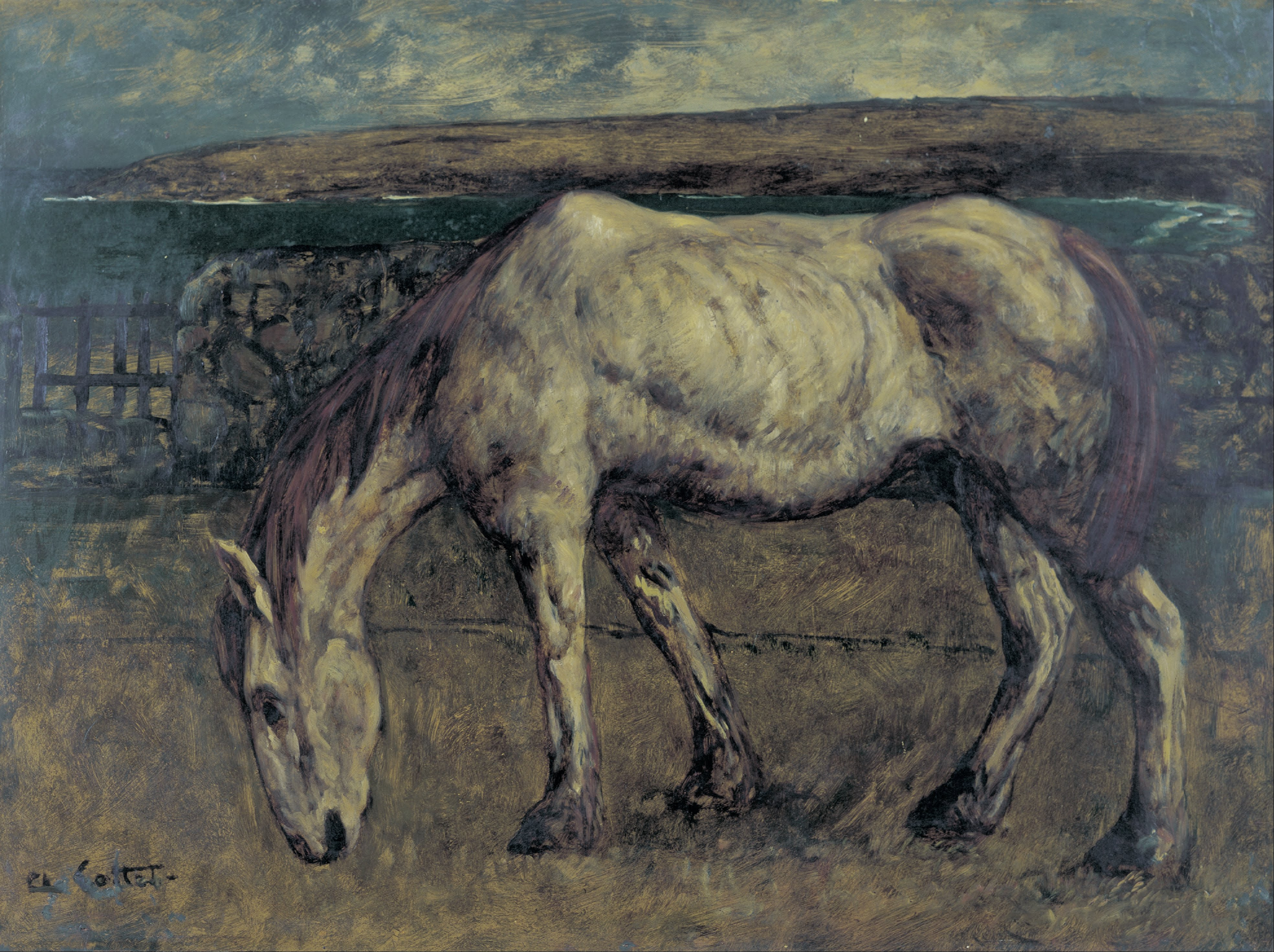
1898 Charles Cottet painting titled Old horse in a vacant lot

It is very rare for a horse to die solely of old age. A survey conducted among French-speaking veterinarians in 1997 indicated that only 0.6% of cases involved death from old age. The leading cause of mortality in horses is colic. Other significant causes of death in horses over fifteen years of age include locomotion disorders such as osteoarthritis and fractures, reproductive system, cardiac arrest and failure, respiratory disorders and various tumors or cancers. In geriatric horses, colic can be exacerbated by fatty tumors, specifically pedunculated lipomas, which may lead to torsion and obstruction during digestion. Mortality associated with reproductive system disorders is often linked to late breeding, resulting in complications such as the rupture of the uterine artery during parturition. Cancers, lymphomas, and tumors are increasingly recognized as major causes of mortality in older horses. Infectious diseases account for only 10–15% of equine deaths. Cardiac arrest is particularly common among older sport horses, while respiratory conditions, such as pulmonary emphysema, are more prevalent in horses retired from riding activities. In many countries, deceased horses are still sent to knackers; however, the establishment of horse cemeteries is gaining popularity.

== Economic aspects ==
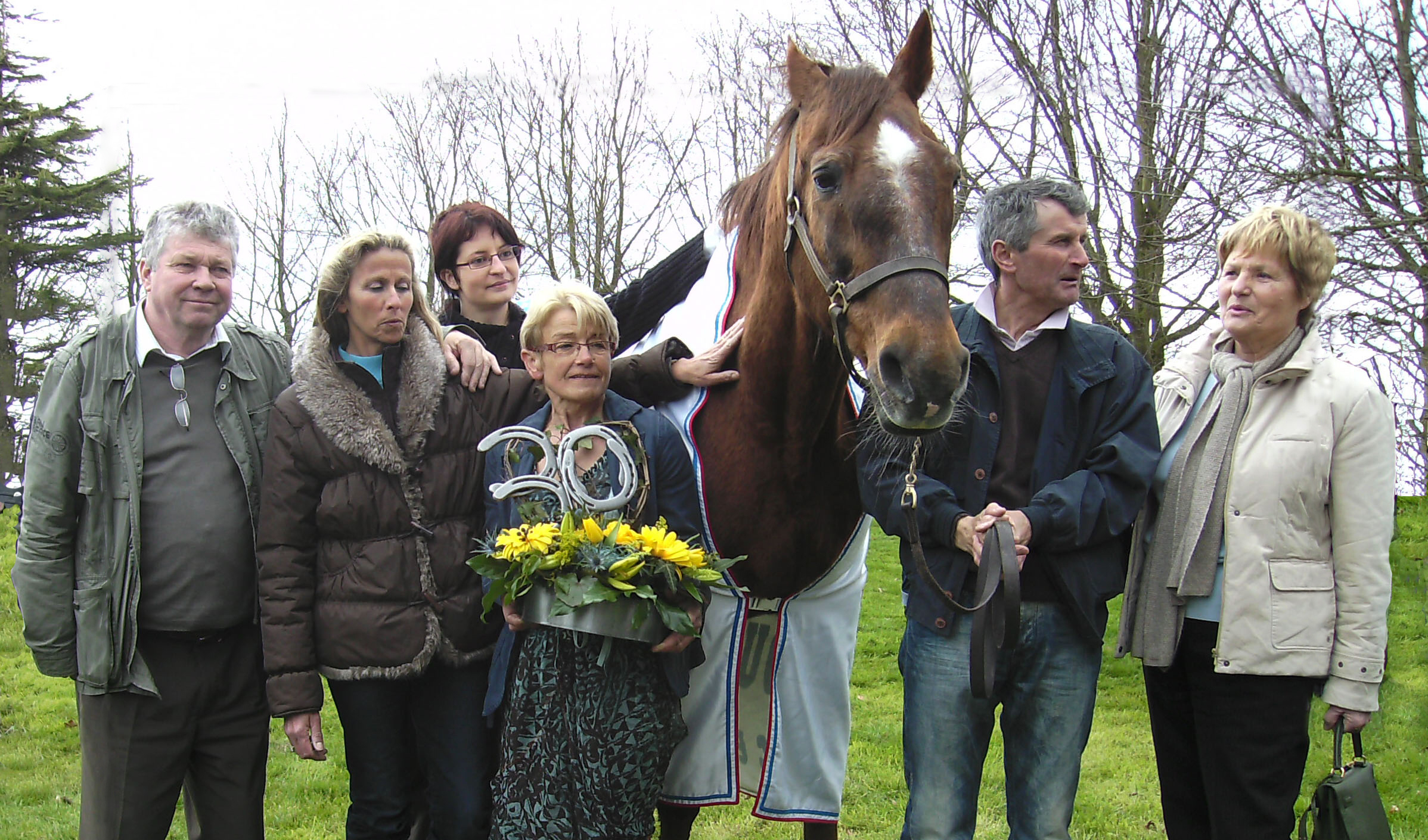
The famous French trotter Ourasi, celebrating its 30th birthday.

Managing horses at the end of their lives presents various economic challenges. In 1990, sociologist and demographer Vérène Chevalier expressed concerns regarding the retirement of horses, arguing that it negatively impacts the equine industry as a whole. She suggested that it encourages owners to allocate funds towards maintaining an aging horse rather than investing in a new one or opting for humane euthanasia. Similarly, the High Council for Food, Agriculture and Rural Areas (Conseil général de l'alimentation, de l'agriculture et des espaces ruraux, CGAAER) and the INRA have argued that reducing the number of horses sent to slaughter in favor of retirement could result in a loss of valuable red meat resources. They contend that the emotional bond between rider and horse often acts as a barrier to euthanasia.

=== Cost ===
Geriatric horses can become difficult to sell and costly to manage. A common scenario involves horses that cannot be resold within the breeding industry and thus lack commercial value. For owners who wish to prevent their horses from being sent to slaughter, it is essential to consider the ongoing costs of care and the potential expenses associated with euthanasia. In some cases, geriatric horses suffering from conditions such as colic may go untreated due to financial constraints. Owners who can no longer afford to care for their horses may choose to donate them to charitable organizations that specialize in equine welfare.

=== Frauds and scams ===
The existence of frauds and scams involving older horses is a well-documented issue. Various organizations and individuals, often posing as charities that promise a happy retirement for these animals, seek to acquire horses at no cost. They subsequently resell these horses to slaughterhouses, profiting from the sale of the meat. In the United States, some unethical therapeutic riding centers have been reported to euthanize donated horses that are deemed too old to ride or to sell them to slaughterhouses. This fraudulent activity has reportedly intensified during economic downturns In France, concerns about "retirement fraud" began to surface around 2011 and became widely recognized in 2013. The issue gained significant attention in August 2013 following the discovery of falsified identification papers for horses in Belgium, which posed health risks to consumers. This situation underscored substantial disagreements among stakeholders in the equine industry and the breeding institutions that represent them. In response, the French National Horse Federation quickly defended the horse meat industry. Subsequently, France has implemented stricter regulations regarding horse slaughter, mandating the presentation of the animal's medication record.

== In culture ==
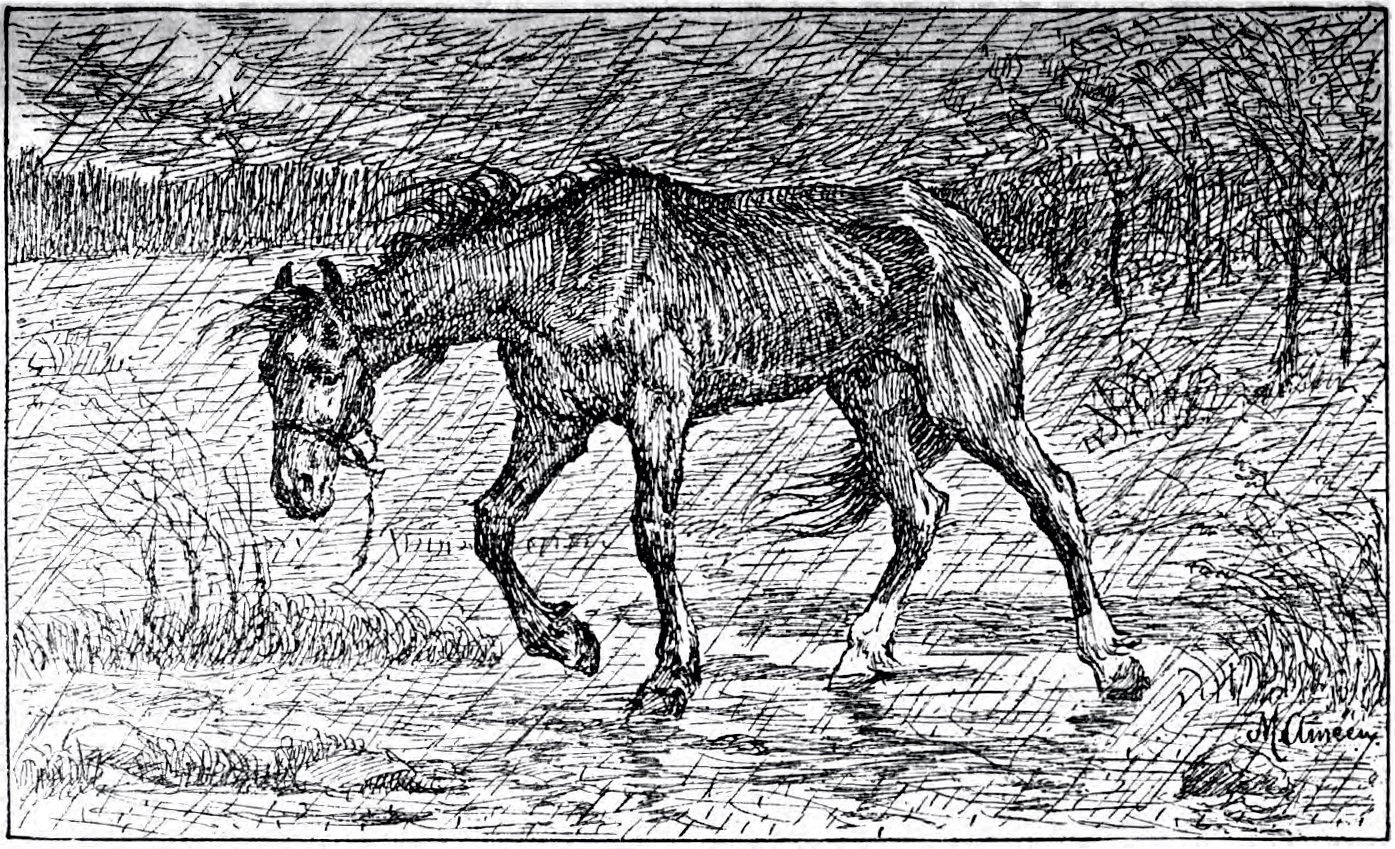
Den gamla hästen (The old horse), drawing by Märta Améen (1871–1940) for a Nils Holgersson edition.

Old horses are referenced in various literary and cinematic works, often symbolizing themes of aging, sacrifice, and the bond between humans and animals. In Nils Holgersson's The Wonderful Adventures of Nils, and George Orwell's Animal Farm, the draft horse Malabar is exploited by the pigs, who deceitfully promise to send him to a hospital but instead sell him to the knacker for a case of whisky. Alexandre Dumas's The Three Musketeers mentions D'Artagnan's 13-year-old horse, which his father entrusts to him with a letter advising against selling it, urging instead that the horse should be allowed to die peacefully of old age. However, D'Artagnan, seeking to improve his standing in Paris, chooses to sell the horse for three écus. In the children’s book Le Vieux Cheval et la Mer, two children fulfill their old horse's wish to see the sea one last time.

In contrast, geriatric horses can also play heroic roles in storytelling. In the Wolof oral tale Le Cheval enchanté, the horse Samba Bingi Bangi, described as "older than God himself," sacrifices its life to save a young girl who is trapped in a marriage to a lion.

In cinema, Béla Tarr's 2011 film The Turin Horse opens with a portrayal of an old coachman and his horse, inspired by an episode from Friedrich Nietzsche's life, in which he embraced an old carriage horse in Turin before succumbing to madness. The film explores the horse's story prior to its encounter with Nietzsche. Similarly, the French film Heureux qui comme Ulysse, featuring Fernandel, tells the story of a 28-year-old Camargue horse destined for death in the arena, which Antonin (played by Fernandel) ultimately frees in the Camargue.

== See also ==
- Equine nutrition
- Cushing's disease
- Horse colic
