= Ormens väg på hälleberget =

- The Way of a Serpent (Swedish: Ormens väg på hälleberget), a 1982 novel by Torgny Lindgren.
- The Serpent's Way (Swedish: Ormens väg på hälleberget), 1986 film adaption of the novel by Bo Widerberg.
