= Helena Munktell =

Swedish composer

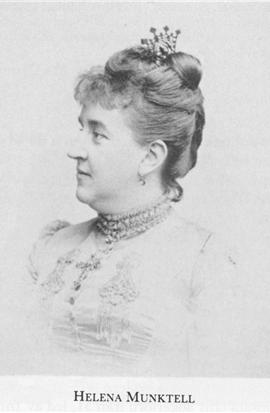
- Born: 24 November 1852; Grycksbo, Sweden
- Died: 10 September 1919 (aged 66); Stockholm, Sweden
- Burial place: Norra begravningsplatsen
- Era: Post-romantic
- Relatives: Emma Josepha Sparre (sister)

Helena Mathilda Munktell (24 November 1852 – 10 September 1919) was a Swedish composer.

== Biography ==
She was born at Grycksbo in Dalarna County, Sweden. She was the youngest of nine children of Henrik Munktell (1804–1861) and Christina Augusta Eggertz (1818-1889). Her mother lived separately in Stockholm and after her father died, the family moved there. Her sister Emma Josepha Sparre (1851–1913) was a painter.

Munktell studied music at the Stockholm Conservatory with Conrad Nordqvist, Johan Lindegren, Ludwig Norman and Joseph Dente, and then in Vienna with Julius Epstein. She studied both piano and voice, and continued her education in composition in Paris with Benjamin Godard and Vincent d'Indy. Her debut as a composer took place in Sweden in 1885. In the late 1890s, Helena Munktell began to compose music for orchestra. In 1915 she became a member of the Royal Swedish Academy of Music and in 1918 she co-founded the Swedish Society of Composers.

She suffered from eye disease and died at the age of 66 in Stockholm. She was buried at Norra begravningsplatsen in Solna.

== Works ==
Munktell composed for orchestra but tended to vocal, choral and operatic works. Selected compositions include:

=== Stage works ===
- In Florence, opera (1889)

=== Orchestral ===
- Bränningar (Breaking Waves), Symphonic Poem (c. early 1890s)
- Suite for Large Orchestra (c. early 1890s)
- Valborgsmessoeld, Sympphonic Poem, Op.24 (1922)
- Suite dalécarlienne/Dalsuite (Dala Suite) Op.22

=== Chamber Music ===
- Violin Sonata opus 21

=== Choral ===
- Cantata for Women's Congress, 1897 ("Forward-walking") Text: H. Widmark

=== Songs ===
- Far on the solitary path, Text: Daniel Fallström
- Isjungfrun (Polar Queen, "Over there in the blinding light"), ballad, text: Emma Josepha Sparre
- May night Voices ("Hear how it calls us"), Text: Erik Axel Karlfeldt
- Serenade ("You-rays up on the balcony"), Text: Daniel Fallström
- Sleep, sleep ("Sleep, sleep, sleep calmly")
- Magic Power ("Look not at me"), Text: Emma Josepha Sparre
- Old coffee-o name-day show ("So have we")
- Song of the woods ("The tears stood bathed")

== Recordings ==
Her music has been recorded and issued on CD, including:

- Helena Munktell (1852-1919): Symphonic works (January 2005) STERLING CDS
