= City novels =

Book series by Per Anders Fogelström

- City of My Dreams; Children of Their City; Remember the City; In a City Transformed; City in the World
- Author: Per Anders Fogelström
- Original title: Stadserien
- Country: Sweden
- Language: Swedish
- Published: 1960–1968
- No. of books: 5

The City novels (Swedish: Stadserien) is a series of five books published between 1960 and 1968 by Swedish author Per Anders Fogelström. The series describes Stockholm from 1860 to 1968.

The novels were translated to English by Jennifer Brown Bäverstam.
