= Emma Josepha Sparre =

Swedish artist (1851–1913)

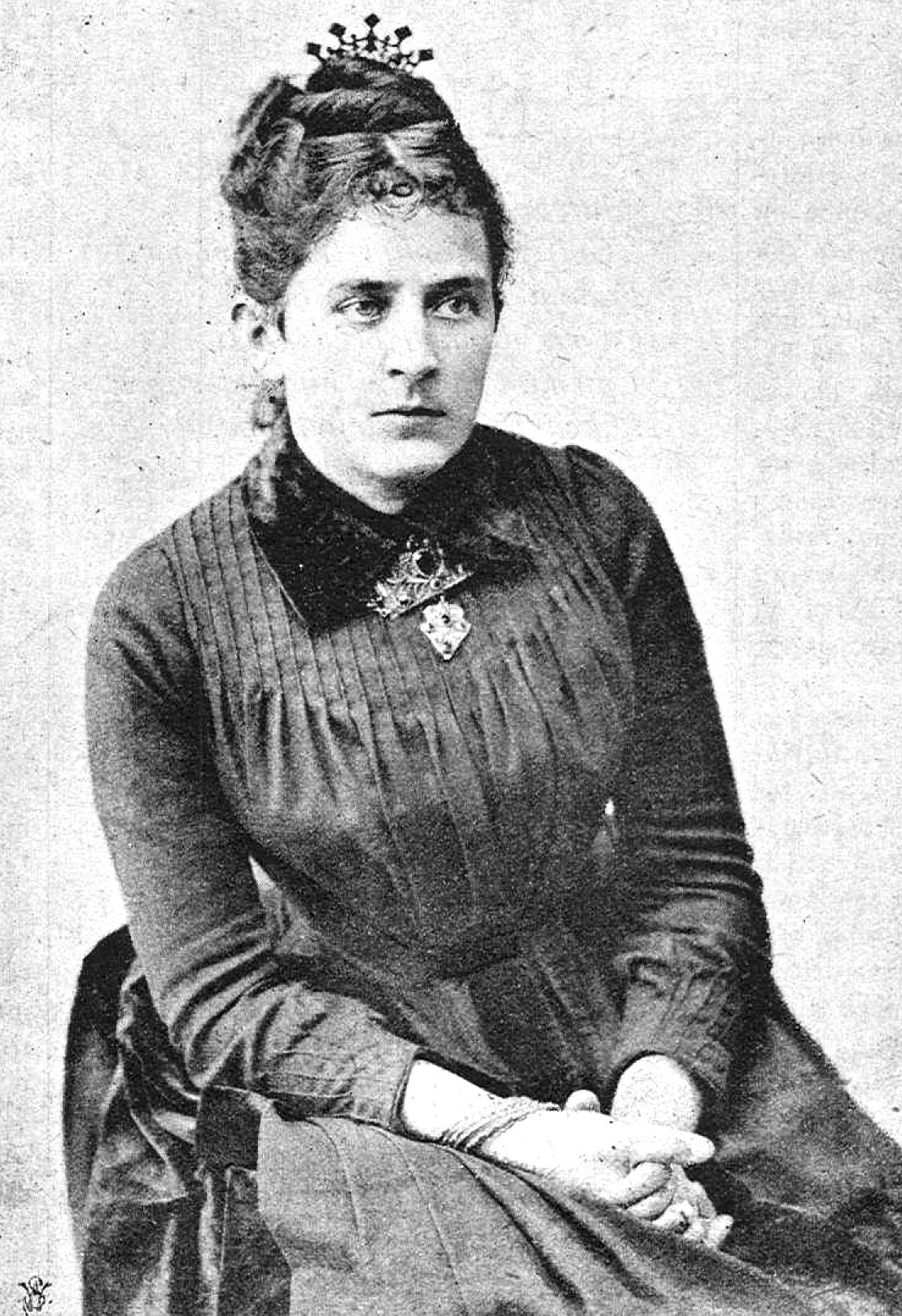
- Emma Josepha Sparre, 1890
- Born: Emma Munktell; 29 June 1851; Grycksbo in Dalarna County, Sweden
- Died: 8 September 1913 (aged 62); Rättvik in Dalarna County, Sweden
- Known for: Painting
- Spouse: Carl Axel Ambjörn Sparre (m. 1870–1891)

Emma Josepha Sparre (29 June 1851 – 8 September 1913) was a Swedish painter.

== Biography ==
Emma Josepha Sparre née Munktell was born at Grycksbo in Dalarna County, Sweden. She was the daughter of Henrik Munktell (1804–1861) and Christina Augusta Eggertz (1818–1889). She was the sister of composer Helena Munktell (1852–1919).

She was married to fellow artist Baron Carl Axel Ambjörn Sparre (1839–1910) from 1870 to 1891. They had a daughter, Märta Améen (1871–1940) who was also a painter.

She attended the Royal Academy of Art in Stockholm and was trained privately by August Malmström. She later studied in Düsseldorf and Rome. She also trained in Paris with painters Pascal-Adolphe-Jean Dagnan-Bouveret and Gustave Courtois at Académie Colarossi.

Sparre exhibited her work at the Palace of Fine Arts at the 1893 World's Columbian Exposition in Chicago, Illinois. She also exhibited at the 1889 Exposition Universelle in Paris, where she received an honorable mention.

She returned to Sweden in the 1890s. Sparre died in 1913 in Rättvik in Dalarna County, Sweden.

Her work is in the collection of the Nationalmuseum in Stockholm.

== Gallery ==
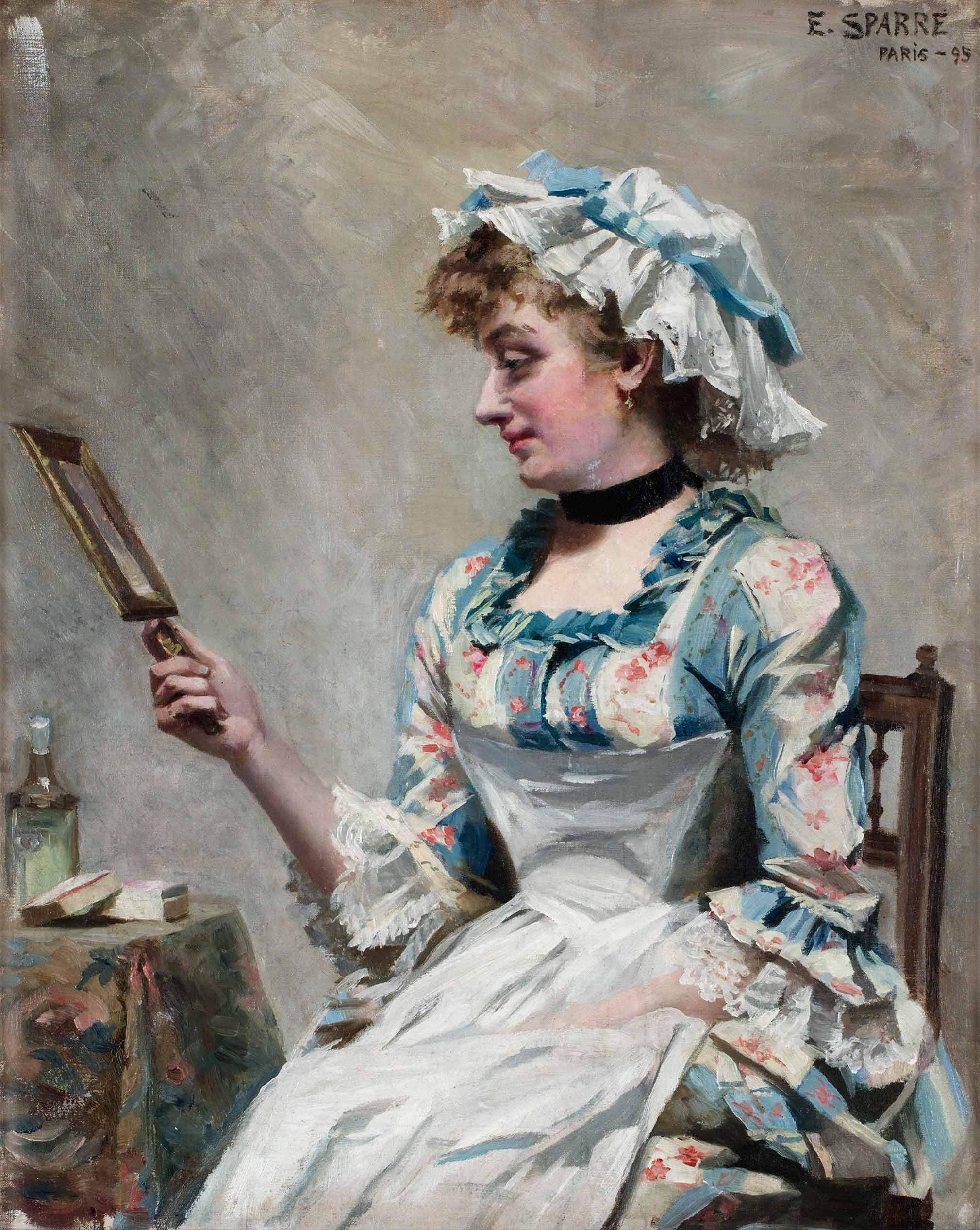
Baroness, 1895

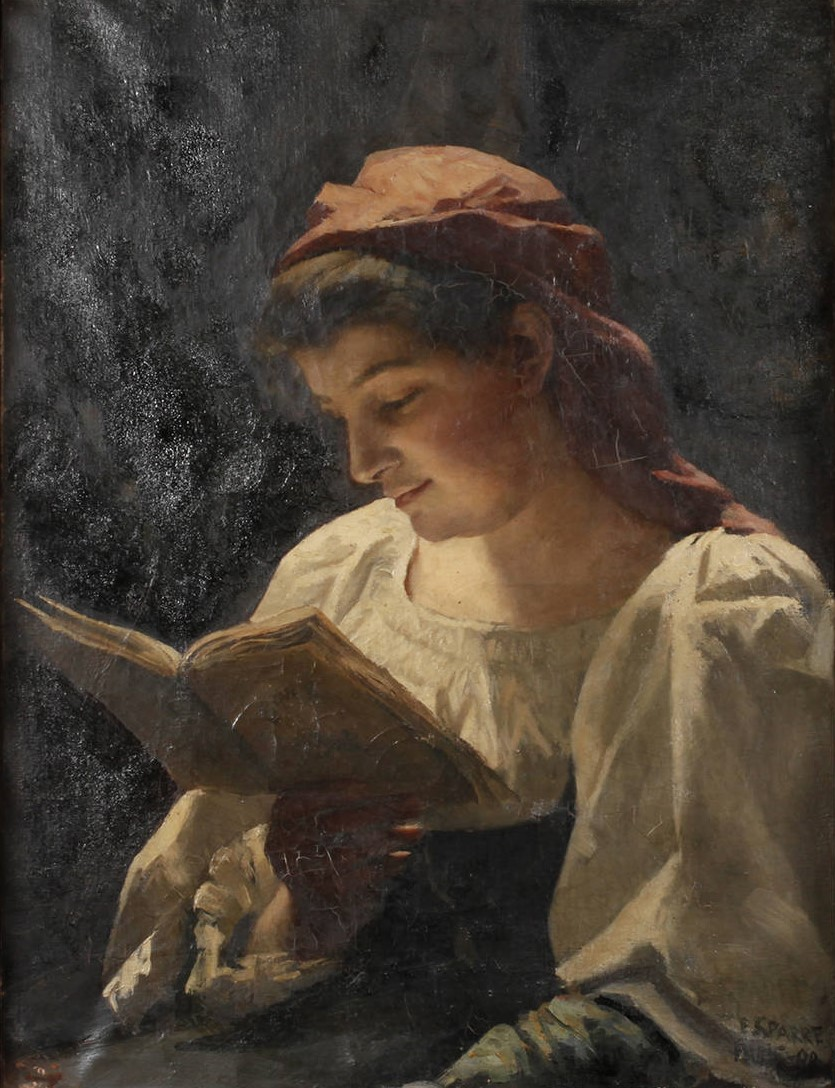
Reading Girl
