= Time on Earth (disambiguation) =

Time on Earth is a 2007 album by Crowded House.

Time on Earth may also refer to:

- "Time on Earth", a song by Robbie Williams from The Heavy Entertainment Show
- A Time on Earth, a 1963 novel by Vilhelm Moberg

== See also ==
- Longevity
- Standard time
- Time zone
