= The Emperor of Portugallia =

1914 novel by Selma Lagerlöf

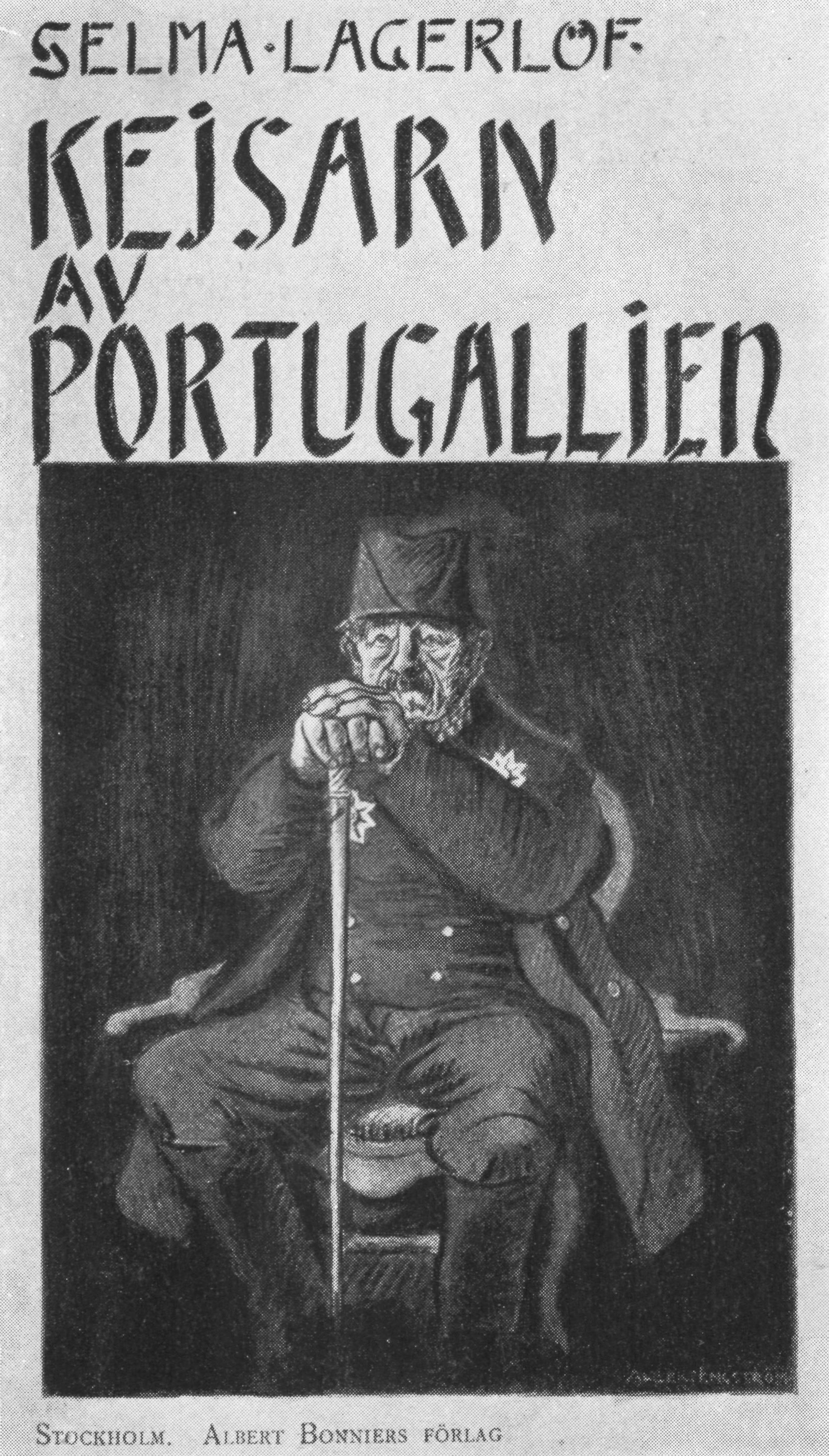
- Swedish first edition 1914
- Author: Selma Lagerlöf
- Original title: Kejsarn av Portugallien
- Translator: Velma Swanston Howard
- Illustrator: Albert Engström
- Language: Swedish
- Genre: Novel
- Publication date: 1914
- Publication place: Sweden
- English publication date: 1916

The Emperor of Portugallia (Swedish: Kejsarn av Portugallien) is a novel by Nobel-laureate Selma Lagerlöf, published in 1914 with drawings by Albert Engström. Lagerlöf called it a "Swedish King Lear". The novel was a success with critics and readers, and newspaper reviewers said the novel was at the same level as Lagerlöf's earlier novels Gösta Berling's Saga and the first part of Jerusalem. It has been filmed three times: 1925, 1944 and 1992. An English translation by Velma Swanston Howard was published in 1916.

== Plot ==
The novel takes place in 1860 or 1870 in Lagerlöf's native Värmland and is about the tenant farmer Jan in Skrolycka and his daughter Glory Goldie Sunnycastle (Klara Fina Gulleborg, nicknamed "Klara Gulla", in original). He loves his daughter more than anything else, but after she moves to Stockholm at age 18, she stops sending letters home. The father sinks into a dream world where he imagines she has become a noble empress of "Portugallia", and he thus also a great Emperor himself. His whole life is dominated by thoughts of her return, and what then will happen. In his role as Emperor residing in the poor countryside, he can challenge the area's social hierarchies: wearing his imperial regalia, he sits at the front of the church, takes place at the head table at parties and tries to socialize with local landlords. The mental breakdown comes from Jan finding out his daughter in Stockholm is really a prostitute and he drifts into being a sort of "holy fool" in the village.

== Adaptions ==
The novel was adapted to silent film by Metro-Goldwyn-Mayer in 1925 as The Tower of Lies, directed by Victor Sjöström and starring Norma Shearer and Lon Chaney. The film is believed to be lost, but still-shots survive. It was filmed again in 1944 as The Emperor of Portugallia, directed by Gustaf Molander and starring Victor Sjöström. In 1992, a television version was made which was written and directed by Lars Molin.
