= City of My Dreams (film) =

1976 film

- Directed by: Ingvar Skogsberg
- Written by: Per Anders Fogelström; Ingvar Skogsberg
- Produced by: Olle Hellbom; Olle Nordemar
- Starring: Eddie Axberg
- Cinematography: John Olsson
- Edited by: Jan Persson
- Music by: Björn Isfält
- Production company: Svensk Filmindustri
- Distributed by: Svensk Filmindustri
- Release date: 29 October 1976
- Running time: 168 minutes
- Country: Sweden
- Language: Swedish

City of My Dreams (Swedish: Mina drömmars stad) is a 1976 Swedish historical drama film directed by Ingvar Skogsberg and based on the book with the same name, written by Per Anders Fogelström. It was screened at the 1978 San Francisco International Film Festival. The film was selected as the Swedish entry for the Best Foreign Language Film at the 49th Academy Awards, but was not accepted as a nominee.

== Cast ==
- Eddie Axberg as Henning Nilsson
- Britt-Louise Tillbom as Lotten Blom
- Kjell-Hugo Grandin as Tummen
- Gunilla Larsson as Matilda
- Åke Wästersjö as Skräcken
- Märta Dorff as Johanna
- Berit Gustafsson as Malin
- Peter Lindgren as Storsäcken
- Fylgia Zadig as Storsäcken's Wife
- Mona Seilitz as Storsäcken's Daughter

== See also ==
- List of submissions to the 49th Academy Awards for Best Foreign Language Film
- List of Swedish submissions for the Academy Award for Best International Feature Film
