= City in the World =

Book by Per Anders Fogelström

- Author: Per Anders Fogelström
- Original title: Stad i världen
- Language: Swedish
- Series: City novels
- Set in: Stockholm, Sweden
- Published: 1968
- Publisher: Albert Bonniers förlag
- Publication place: Sweden
- Preceded by: In a City Transformed

City in the World (Swedish: Stad i världen) is a 1968 novel by Swedish author Per Anders Fogelström. It is the fifth and last novel of the City novels, Fogelström's five-book sequence about Stockholm's development from the 19th century to the post-war era..

== Background ==
Fogelström's City sequence consists of five novels published between 1960 and 1968 and portrays Stockholm over more than a century. On its author page, Albert Bonniers Förlag lists Stad i världen as part of the publisher's Stadserien grouping of Fogelström's work.

== Plot ==
City in the World covers the period from 1945 to 1968. The narrative follows Henning and Lotten's descendants in post-war Stockholm as the city changes rapidly from a poorer industrial capital into a modern metropolis. The novel presents a generation living in a more affluent city and country, while increasingly recognizing that events beyond Sweden also shape their lives, underscoring the idea that Stockholm is "a city in the world".

== Themes ==
Stockholmskällan describes the book's depiction of place as so central that Stockholm becomes "one of the book's true main characters". More broadly, Stockholmskällan characterizes Fogelström's authorship as one in which the city functions as a principal character and the City series traces Stockholm's continual transformation over time.

Gellerfelt has also noted the international outlook of Fogelström's city sequence, arguing that although the novels are strongly rooted in Stockholm, the outside world presses in ever more forcefully through war, politics and social change. That perspective is especially pertinent to the final novel, whose title and period setting place Stockholm within a wider post-war world.

== Publication history ==
The novel was originally published in 1968 by Albert Bonniers Förlag. Later editions have been issued by Bonnier. A 2007 edition is catalogued by the Swedish national union catalogue LIBRIS as published in Stockholm by Bonnier and comprising 308 pages. Bonnier Audio has also released an audiobook edition read by Helge Skoog.
