= Märta Améen =

Swedish artist (1871–1940)

Märta Augusta Karolina Emma Axelsdotter Améen (née Sparre; 28 February 1871, in Vienna – 25 June 1940, in Barksäter) was a Swedish painter and sculptor.

The daughter of artist Emma Josepha Sparre, her works are in the collections of the Nationalmuseum and the Swedish Army Museum. She studied at the Académie Colarossi in Paris, and illustrated the novel The Wonderful Adventures of Nils (1906/07) by Selma Lagerlöf.
