= City of My Dreams =

Novel by Per Anders Fogelström

- Author: Per Anders Fogelström
- Original title: Mina drömmars stad
- Translator: Jennifer Brown Bäverstam
- Language: Swedish
- Series: City novels
- Publisher: Albert Bonniers förlag
- Publication date: 1960
- Publication place: Sweden
- English publication date: 2000
- Pages: 289
- Followed by: Children of Their City

City of My Dreams (Swedish: Mina drömmars stad) is a 1960 novel by the Swedish writer Per Anders Fogelström. The narrative follows a group of working-class people on Södermalm in Stockholm between 1860 and 1880. It was the first novel in a series of five. It was adapted into a 1976 film with the same title, directed by Ingvar Skogsberg.

== See also ==
- 1960 in literature
- Swedish literature
