= Harold Heartt Foley =

American painter

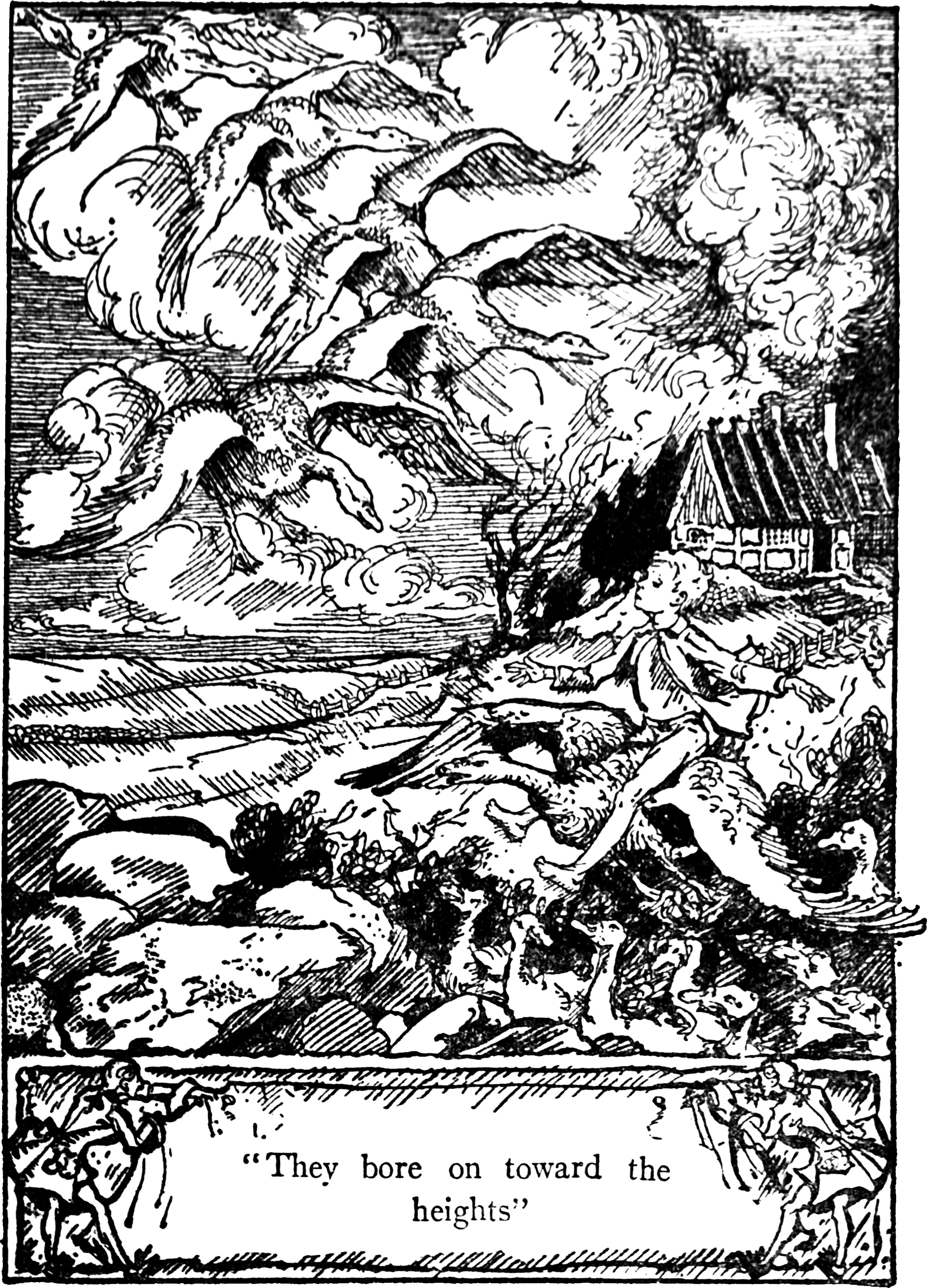
- Illustration for The Wonderful Adventures of Nils, 1907
- Born: Harold Leroy Livingston; 1878; New York City, New York, US
- Died: 1923 (aged 44–45); Paris, France
- Known for: Classicism, Impressionism

Harold Heartt Foley (1878–1923) was an early-twentieth-century American painter, collagist and illustrator.

== Youth and education ==
Born in New York City in 1878, the young Harold Leroy Livingston grew up in a wealthy family. He was a good student of art and quickly became a success as a painter and magazine illustrator. The influence of Howard Pyle and Arthur Rackham is obvious in many of his works during the period 1900–1910. He aspired to participate in the Golden Age of Illustration generation. As he was fascinated by European history and arts, he decided to move there.

== Europe ==
In September 1906, in Malta, he married Elizabeth Schell-Cragin. Foley became famous as Harold Heartt for his illustration of Selma Lagerlöf's book The Wonderful Adventures of Nils published in New York by Grosset & Dunlap in 1907. The couple settled in Paris.

In 1908 he exhibited his works in the Paris Salon.

Well known in the "American colony", Harold and his wife welcomed and helped American artists living abroad, such as Arthur Dove.

Harold Heartt Foley died in Paris in 1923 and was buried in Montparnasse cemetery.

== See also ==
- The Wonderful Adventures of Nils

== Sources ==
- Daudé, Romain (2026). Harold Heartt Foley 1878-1923, itinérances d'un illustrateur étasunien en France. Texte de conférence, Amitiés Franco-britanniques. EAN 9791098528606; ISBN 979-10-985286-0-6; https://hal.science/hal-05690287.
