= Mary Hamilton Frye =

American artist (1890–1951)

- Born: April 18, 1890; Salem, Massachusetts, US
- Died: 18 May 1951 (aged 61); Brookline, Massachusetts
- Resting place: Sleepy Hollow Cemetery (Concord, Mass.)
- Education: School of the Museum of Fine Arts, Boston
- Known for: Stained glass; Children's book illustration
- Notable work: The Wonderful Adventures of Nils
- Movement: Arts and Crafts movement

Mary Hamilton Frye (April 18, 1890 – May 18, 1951) was an American stained glass artist and children's book illustrator.

== Biography ==
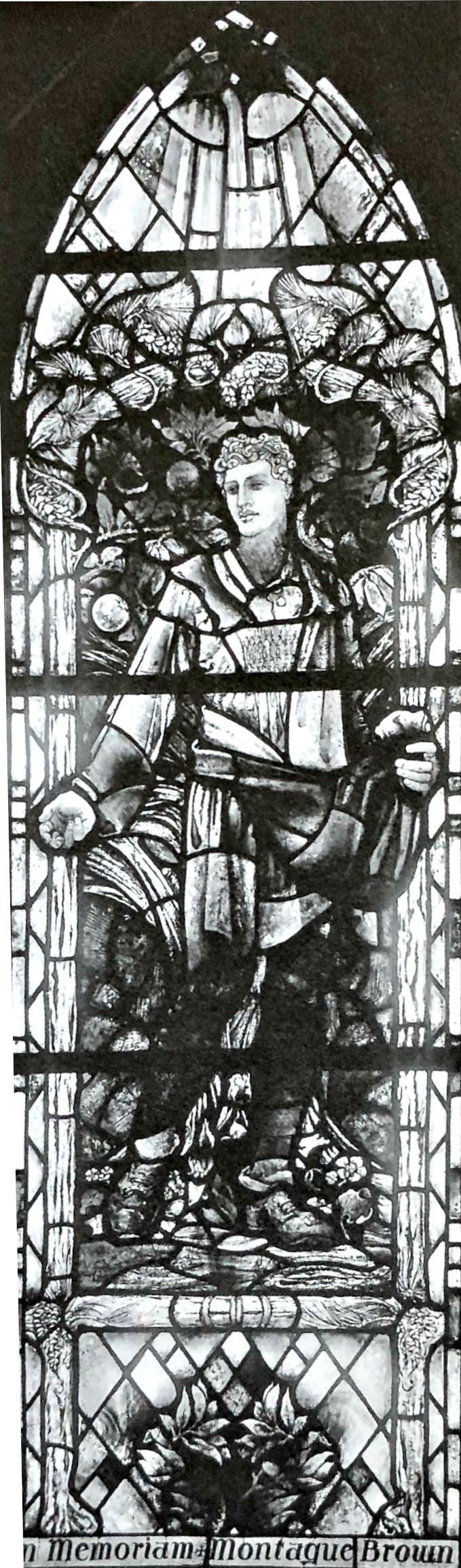
St. Andrew's Church, La Tuque Quebec, 1922

Mary Hamilton Frye was born in Salem, Massachusetts on April 18, 1890. Her parents were Nathan Frye and Alice H. Chase. Her family later moved to Cambridge around 1896 and lived at 10 Acacia Street in Cambridge.

Frye was educated at the School of the Museum of Fine Arts, Boston. She initially became a children's book illustrator, illustrating many works including the Wonderful Adventures of Nils by Swedish author Selma Lagerlöf.

Over time, Frye became interested in working in stained glass. She took classes from prominent stained glass artist, Charles Connick at his Harcourt Street Studio in Boston. Connick arranged for Frye to study in London with famed stained glass artist, Christopher Whall. She completed a seven month apprenticeship with Whall's studio.

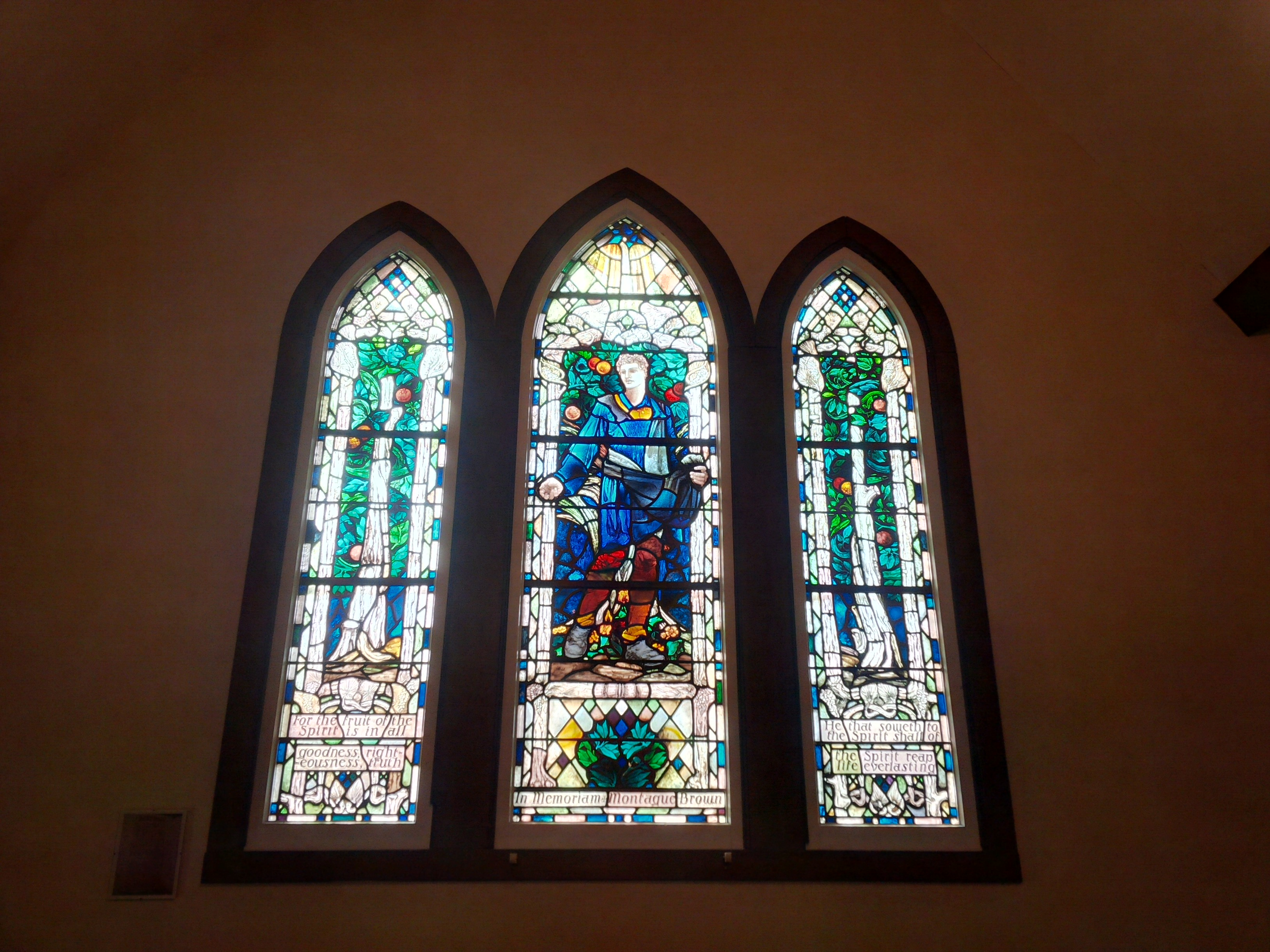
Stained Glass from Mary Hamilton Frye At La Tuque Québec

When Frye returned to Boston, She opened her own stained glass studio on Church Street in Cambridge in 1920. In 1922, she created a three-light window for St. Andrew's Anglican Church at La Tuque, Quebec, Canada that shows the influence of Whall's mentorship. In Cambridge, she designed windows at Bertram and Eliot halls in the Radcliffe Quadrangle.

She exhibited her work with the Cambridge Art League and The Society of Arts and Crafts of Boston.

In 1949, Frye moved to Concord, Massachusetts and worked as an artist at the Boston Museum of Science. Frye died of breast cancer at the age of 61 on May 18, 1951, and is buried in Sleepy Hollow Cemetery in Concord.
