= Per Anders Fogelström =

Swedish writer (1917–1998)

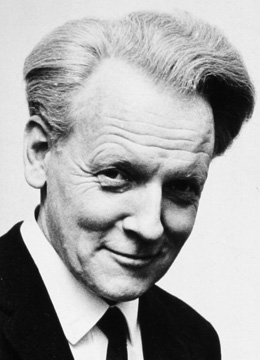
- Per Anders Fogelström
- Born: 22 August 1917; Matteus Parish, Stockholm, Sweden
- Died: 20 June 1998 (aged 80); Sofia Parish, Stockholm, Sweden
- Occupations: Writer, journalist, political activist
- Writing career
- Language: Swedish

Per Anders Fogelström (22 August 1917, Stockholm – 20 June 1998 Stockholm) was a Swedish writer of over 40 novels, and one of the leading figures in modern Swedish literature. He spent his whole life in Stockholm, where he set his famous five part City Novels series (Swedish: Stadserien), describing the lives of successive generations of Stockholmers between 1860 and 1968:

- Mina Drömmars stad (City of My Dreams), published in 1960, covers the period from 1860-1880.
- Barn av sin stad (Children of Their City), published in 1962, covers 1880-1900.
- Minns du den stad (Remember the City), published in 1964, covers 1900-1925.
- I en förvandlad stad (In a City Transformed), published in 1966, covers 1925-1945.
- Stad i världen (City in the World), published in 1968, covers 1945-1968.

All five novels have been published in an English translation by Jennifer Brown Bäverstam.

A film adaptation of City of My Dreams (Swedish: Mina drömmars stad) was released in 1976, directed by Ingvar Skogsberg, with narration from Fogelström.

His 1949 novel Ligister ("Gangsters") was adapted into a film, released in 1950, titled While the City Sleeps (Swedish: Medan staden sover). Fogelström himself wrote the screenplay, with some input from the renowned filmmaker Ingmar Bergman, while Lars-Eric Kjellgren served as director. Bergman and Fogelström collaborated a second time, for Bergman's 1953 film Summer with Monika (Swedish: Sommaren med Monika). The film was based on an unpublished short story that Fogelström had written. In conjunction with the film's production, Fogelström developed the short story into a novel instead, which was published in 1951, under the same title the film was later released as.

An active pacifist, Fogelström served as director of the Swedish Peace and Arbitration Society (Swedish: Svenska freds- och skiljedomsföreningen) from 1963 to 1977. He was also a member of the Swedish Vietnam Committee (Swedish: Svenska Vietnamkommittén), an organization opposing the Vietnam War, and a strong opponent of nuclear weapons.

He received an honorary doctorate from Stockholm University in 1976, and was awarded the Swedish royal medal Litteris et Artibus in 1996. After his death, a bust of Fogelström was unveiled in Stockholm City Hall.
