= Remember the City =

1964 novel by Per Anders Fogelström

- Author: Per Anders Fogelström
- Original title: Minns du den stad
- Language: Swedish
- Series: City novels
- Set in: Stockholm, Sweden
- Published: 1964
- Publisher: Albert Bonniers förlag
- Publication place: Sweden
- Preceded by: Children of Their City
- Followed by: In a City Transformed

Remember the City (Swedish: Minns du den stad) is a 1964 novel by Swedish author Per Anders Fogelström. It is the third novel of the City novels.
