= The Serpent's Way =

1986 film

- Swedish poster
- Directed by: Bo Widerberg
- Written by: Bo Widerberg; Torgny Lindgren
- Produced by: Göran Lindström
- Starring: Stina Ekblad
- Cinematography: Jörgen Persson
- Edited by: Bo Widerberg
- Release date: 25 December 1986
- Running time: 111 minutes
- Country: Sweden
- Language: Swedish

The Serpent's Way (Swedish: Ormens väg på hälleberget) is a 1986 Swedish drama film directed by Bo Widerberg. It is based on the novel The Way of a Serpent by Torgny Lindgren. The film was screened in the Un Certain Regard section at the 1987 Cannes Film Festival and in competition at the 15th Moscow International Film Festival. At the 22nd Guldbagge Awards Stina Ekblad won the award for Best Actress.

== Plot ==
A salesman and his son sexually abuse the generations of women of a poor family as payment for debt. Janni must see his mother, sister, niece and wife all being exploited, and the family grow bigger with the abuser's kids.

== Cast ==
- Stina Ekblad as Tea Alexisdotter
- Stellan Skarsgård as Karl Orsa Markström
- Reine Brynolfsson as Jani
- Pernilla August as Eva (as Pernilla Östergren)
- Tomas von Brömssen as Jacob
- Pernilla Wahlgren as Johanna
- Ernst Günther as Ol Karlsa
- Birgitta Ulfsson as Grandma
- Johan Widerberg as Jani as a child
- Melinda Kinnaman as Eva as child
