= In a City Transformed =

1966 novel by Per Anders Fogelström

- Author: Per Anders Fogelström
- Original title: I en förvandlad stad
- Language: Swedish
- Series: City novels
- Set in: Stockholm, Sweden
- Published: 1966
- Publisher: Albert Bonniers förlag
- Publication place: Sweden
- Preceded by: Remember the City
- Followed by: City in the World

In a City Transformed (Swedish: I en förvandlad stad) is a 1966 novel by Swedish author Per Anders Fogelström. It is the fourth novel of the City novels.
