= Children of Their City =

1962 novel by Per Anders Fogelström

- Author: Per Anders Fogelström
- Original title: Barn av sin stad
- Language: Swedish
- Series: City novels
- Set in: Stockholm, Sweden
- Published: 1962
- Publisher: Albert Bonniers förlag
- Publication place: Sweden
- Preceded by: City of My Dreams
- Followed by: Remember the City

Children of Their City (Swedish: Barn av sin stad) is a 1962 novel by Swedish author Per Anders Fogelström. It is the second novel of the City novels.
