= The Way of a Serpent =

1982 novel by Torgny Lindgren

- Author: Torgny Lindgren
- Original title: Ormens väg på hälleberget
- Translator: Tom Geddes
- Language: Swedish
- Published: 1982
- Publication place: Sweden

The Way of a Serpent (Swedish: Ormens väg på hälleberget, lit. 'The Way of a Serpent upon a Rock', a quotation from Proverbs 30:19) is a 1982 novel by Swedish author Torgny Lindgren.

== Plot ==
The novel takes place in the fictional town of Kullmyrliden along the Vindelälven in Västerbotten's hinterland during the second half of the 19th century. The main character Johan Johansson, "Jani", was born in 1849 as the eldest son in a crofter family where the paternal grandfather, due to a lack of business acumen, lost the ownership of his homestead to the local merchant Ol Karlsa. When the paternal grandfather and later also the protagonist's father die, the family is left without real support, and the merchant Ol Karlsa then chooses to collect the rent for the homestead by requesting sexual services from the protagonist's mother Tea. After Ol Karlsa's death, his son Karl Orsa continues to claim the rent in the same way, initially from Tea but later also from Tea's daughter Eva (who is also his half-sister) and after her death in childbirth from the main character Jani's wife Johanna.

== Adaptations ==
A film adaptation by Bo Widerberg, The Serpent's Way, was made in 1986.
