= Grycksbo =

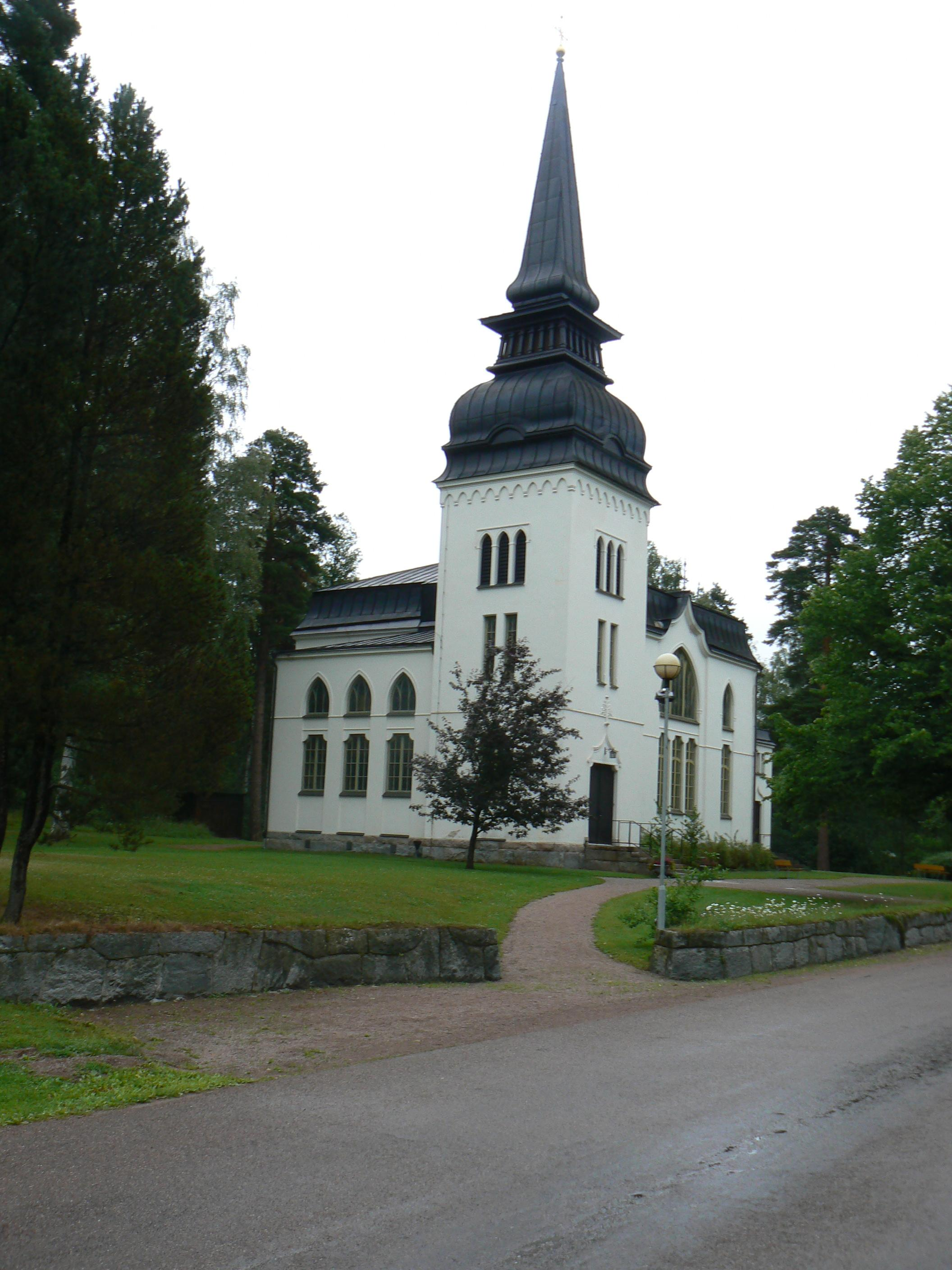
- Grycksbo Church

- Location within Dalarna Location within Sweden
- Coordinates: 60°41′N 15°28′E
- Country: Sweden
- Province: Dalarna
- County: Dalarna County
- Municipality: Falun Municipality

Area
  - Total: 2.54 km^{2} (0.98 sq mi)

Population (31 December 2010)
  - Total: 1,825
  - Density: 718/km^{2} (1,860/sq mi)
- Time zone: UTC+1 (CET)
  - Summer (DST): UTC+2 (CEST)
- Climate: Dfb

Grycksbo is a locality situated in Falun Municipality, Dalarna County, Sweden with 1,825 inhabitants in 2010.
