= A Time on Earth =

1963 novel by Vilhelm Moberg

- Author: Vilhelm Moberg
- Original title: Din stund på jorden
- Translator: Naomi Walford
- Language: Swedish
- Set in: Laguna Beach, California, United States, 1962
- Published: 1963
- Publisher: Bonniers
- Publication place: Sweden
- English publication date: 1965

A Time on Earth (Swedish: Din stund på jorden, lit. 'Your Time on Earth') is a 1963 novel by Swedish writer Vilhelm Moberg. It's set in Laguna Beach, California, United States in 1962, where a Swedish-American lives.

It was translated into English in 1965 by Naomi Walford as "A Time on Earth".
