= The Wonderful Adventures of Nils =

1906 novel by Selma Lagerlöf

- Title page of the first edition
- Author: Selma Lagerlöf
- Original title: Nils Holgerssons underbara resa genom Sverige
- Language: Swedish
- Series: Läseböcker för Sveriges barndomsskolor
- Genre: Children's literature
- Publisher: Albert Bonniers Förlag
- Publication date: 1906–07
- Publication place: Sweden
- Media type: Print
- Pages: 723
- Dewey Decimal: 839.78
- LC Class: PZ7 .W
- Original text: Nils Holgerssons underbara resa genom Sverige at Swedish Wikisource
- Translation: The Wonderful Adventures of Nils at Wikisource

The Wonderful Adventures of Nils (Swedish: Nils Holgerssons underbara resa genom Sverige, lit. 'Nils Holgersson's wonderful journey across Sweden') is a work of fiction by the Swedish writer Selma Lagerlöf, the first woman to receive the Nobel Prize in Literature. It was originally published in two books, 1906 and 1907, and was first published in English as The Wonderful Adventures of Nils (1907) and The Further Adventures of Nils (1911). The two parts are later usually published together, in English as The Wonderful Adventures of Nils, but that name may also refer to the first part alone.

Like many leading Swedish intellectuals of her time, Selma Lagerlöf was an advocate of Swedish spelling reform. When first published, this book was also one of the first to adopt the new spelling mandated by a government resolution on April 7, 1906.

== Origin ==
The background for publication was a commission from the National Teachers Association in 1902 to write a geography reader for the public schools. The project was called Läseböcker för Sveriges barndomsskolor and also resulted in Verner von Heidenstam's The Swedes and Their Chieftains (1908–1910) and Sven Hedin's From Pole to Pole (1911). From the translation of Velma Swanston Howard's introduction: "She devoted three years to Nature study and to familiarizing herself with animal and bird life. She has sought out hitherto unpublished folklore and legends of the different provinces. These she has ingeniously woven into her story".

== Plot ==
The book is about a young lad, Nils Holgersson, whose "chief delight was to eat and sleep, and after that he liked best to make mischief". He takes great delight in hurting the animals on his family farm. Nils captures a tomte in a net while his family are at church and have left him home to memorize chapters from the Bible. The tomte proposes to Nils that if Nils frees him, the tomte will give him a huge gold coin. Nils rejects the offer and the tomte turns Nils into a tomte, which leaves him shrunken and able to talk with animals, who are thrilled to see the boy reduced to their size and are angry and hungry for revenge. While this is happening, wild geese are flying over the farm on one of their migrations, and Martin, the farm's white goose attempts to join the wild ones. In an attempt to salvage something before his family returns, Nils holds on to Martin's neck as he successfully takes off and joins the wild birds.

The wild geese, who are not pleased at all to be joined by a boy and a domestic goose, eventually take them on an adventurous trip across all the historical provinces of Sweden, observing in passing their natural characteristics and economic resources. At the same time the characters and situations he encounters make him a man: the domestic goose needs to prove his ability to fly like the experienced wild geese, and Nils needs to prove to the geese that he would be a useful companion, despite their initial misgivings. During the trip, Nils learns that if he proves he has changed for the better, the tomte might be disposed to change him back to his normal size.

The book also includes various subplots, concerning people and animals whose lives are touched in one way or another by Nils and the wild geese. For example, one chapter centers on a provincial man who feels lonely and alienated in the capital Stockholm, is befriended by a nice old gentleman who tells him (and the reader) about the city's history - and only later finds that it was none other than the King of Sweden, walking incognito in the park.

The book was criticized for the fact that the goose and boy do not make any stop in the province Halland. In chapter 53 they fly over Halland on the way back to Scania, but they are not impressed by the sight and they don't stop, although a chapter has been added to some translations of the book. In depictions Nils is usually wearing a red cap, but this is erroneous as he is described in the original Swedish edition as wearing a white cap.

Chapter	Title	Places	Historical provinces
1	The Boy ("Pojken")	Västra Vemmenhög, around seven kilometres south (and today part) of Skurup	Scania
2	Akka from Kebnekaise ("Akka från Kebnekajse")	Vombsjön	Scania
3	The Wonderful Journey of Nils ("Vildfågelsliv")	Vittskövle Castle, Övedskloster Manor	Scania
4	Glimminge Castle ("Glimmingehus")	Glimmingehus	Scania
5	The Great Crane Dance on Kullaberg ("Den stora trandansen på Kullaberget")	Kullaberg	Scania
6	In Rainy Weather ("I regnväder")		Blekinge
7	The Staircase with the Three Steps ("Trappan med de tre trappstegen")	Blekinge archipelago	Blekinge
8	By Ronneby River ("Vid Ronneby Å")	Ronneby	Blekinge
9	Karlskrona ("Karlskrona")	Karlskrona	Blekinge
10	The Trip to Öland ("Resa till Öland")	Kalmar Strait	between Öland and Småland
11	Öland's Southern Point ("Ölands södra udde")	Southern tip of Öland, Ottenby	Öland
12	The Big Butterfly ("Den stora fjärilen")	Öland, Stora Alvaret	Öland
13	Little Karl's Island ("Lilla Karlsö")	Lilla Karlsö	Gotland
14	Two Cities ("Två städer")	Vineta, Visby	Gotland, Pomerania
15	The Legend of Småland ("Sagan om Småland")	Tjust	Småland
16	The Crows ("Kråkorna")	Sunnerbo härad	Småland
17	The Old Peasant Woman ("Den gamla bondkvinnan")		Småland
18	From Taberg to Huskvarna ("Från Taberg till Huskvarna")	Taberg, Jönköping, Huskvarna	Småland
19	The Big Bird Lake ("Den stora fågelsjön")	Tåkern, Omberg	Östergötland
20	Ulvåsa-Lady ("Spådomen")	Tåkern, Omberg, Vadstena Abbey, Motala, Finspång, Norrköping	Östergötland
21	Vadmalsvåden ("The Homespun Cloth")		Östergötland

== Publication ==
An English-language translation by Velma Swanston Howard was originally published in 1907 and 1911 as The Wonderful Adventures of Nils and Further Adventures of Nils. The Howard text is that of many later publications that contain the original illustrations, new illustrations, or none at all. Howard's first volume contains 21 chapters. Swedish-language chapter titles are identical to those of the 21 chapters in the original volume one (1906). Howard's second volume contains 22 chapters numbered 1 to 22, where the original volume two (1907) contains 34 chapters numbered 22 to 55. Swedish-language chapter titles are identical to those of 22 among the 34 original chapters. Chapter titles 6 to 18 match original chapter titles 36 to 48.

Howard cut some chapters entirely and abridged others. Some provinces are not featured in the Howard translation, including Dalarna, which is visited in four original chapters (29 to 32).

Chapter	Title	Places	Historical provinces
1	The Story of Karr and Grayskin ("Karrs och Gråfälls saga")	Kolmården	Östergötland, Södermanland
2	The Wind Witch ("I Närke")	Örebro	Närke
3	The Breaking Up Of The Ice ("Islossningen")	Hjälmaren	Närke
4	Thumbietot and the Bears ("Järnverket")		Västmanland
5	The Flood ("Översvämmningen")	Mälaren	Uppland
6	Dunfin ("Dunfin")	Mälaren, Stockholm archipelago	Uppland
7	Stockholm ("Stockholm")	Stockholm, Skansen	Uppland
8	Gorgo, the Eagle ("Gorgo, örnen")		
9	On Over Gästrikland ("Fram över Gästrikland")		Gästrikland
10	A Day in Hälsingland ("En dag i Hälsingland")	Delsbo	Hälsingland
11	In Medelpad ("I Medelpad")	Sundsvall, Alnön island	Medelpad
12	A Morning in Ångermanland ("En morgon i Ångermanland")		Ångermanland
13	Westbottom and Lapland ("Västerbotten och Lappland")		Västerbotten, Lapland (Sweden)
14	Osa, the Goose Girl, and Little Mats ("Åsa gåsapiga och lille Mats")	Malmberget	Lapland
15	With the Laplanders ("Hos lapparna")	Kiruna Municipality	Lapland, Sápmi
16	Homeward Bound ("Mot söder! Mot söder!")	Östersund	Jämtland
17	Legends from Härjedalen ("Sägner från Härjedalen")	Sonfjället National Park	Härjedalen
18	Vermland and Dalsland ("Värmland och Dalsland")	Klarälven, Fryken	Värmland, Dalsland
19	The Treasure on the Island ("Skatten på skäret")	Fjällbacka, Väderöarna	Bohuslän
20	The Journey to Vemmenhög ("Resa till Vemmenhög")	Falköping, Bosjökloster, Ringsjön	Halland, Scania
21	Home at Last ("Hos Holger Nilssons")		Scania
22	The Parting with the Wild Geese ("Avsked från vildgässen")	Smygehuk	Scania

=== Print editions ===
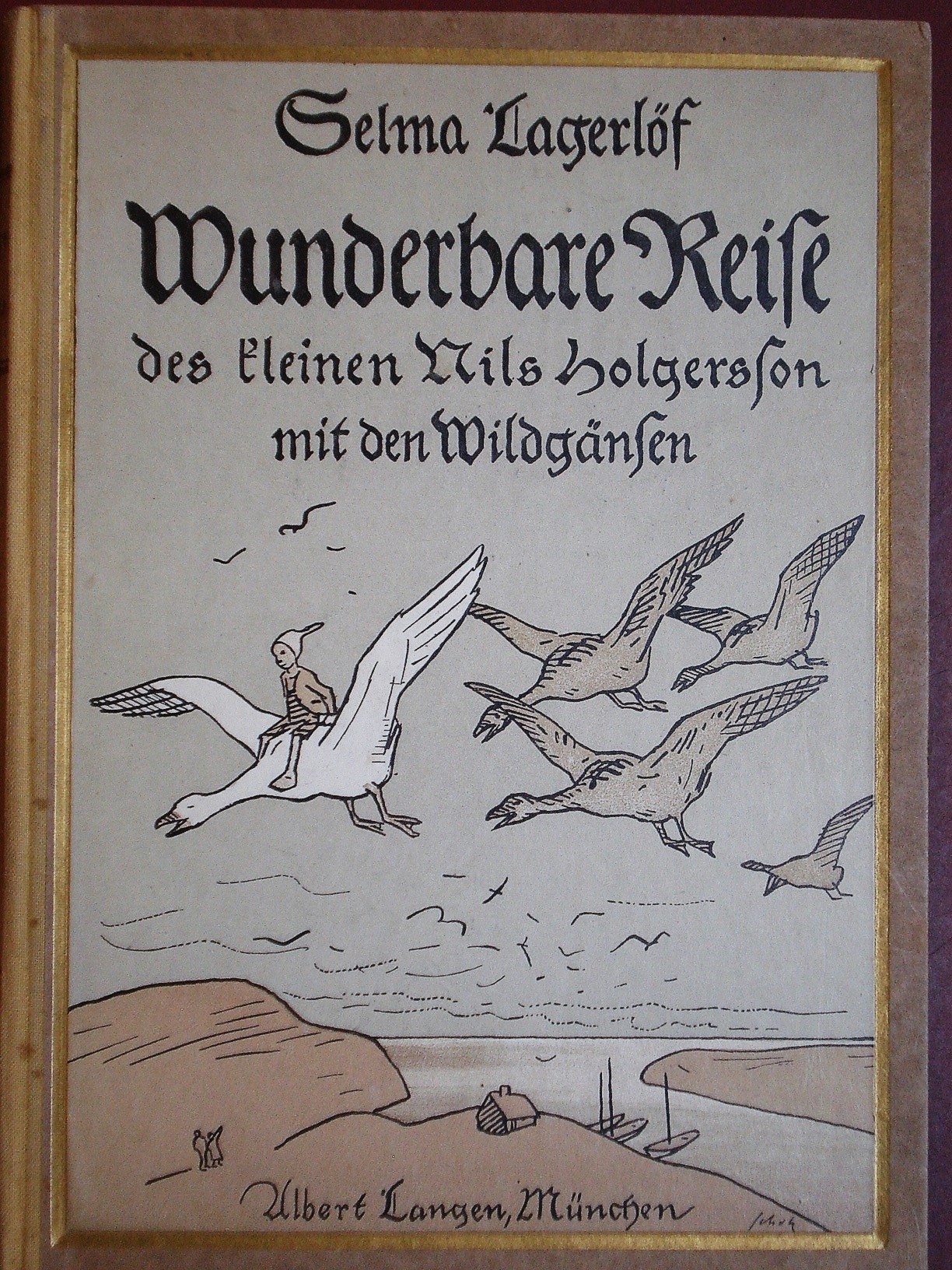
German translation, 1923

- The Wonderful Adventures of Nils, illustrated by Harold Heartt Foley, New York: Grosset & Dunlap, 1907.
- The Wonderful Adventures of Nils, translated by Velma Swanston Howard, illustrated by Mary Hamilton Frye, Garden City, New York: Doubleday, Page & Company, 1913.
- The Wonderful Adventures of Nils, illustrated by H. Baumhauer, J. M. Dent and Sons, 1950.

== Adaptations ==
A Soviet cel animated feature film called The Enchanted Boy (Russian: Заколдо́ванный ма́льчик, Zakoldovannyy Malchik) was released in 1955. It was directed by Vladimir Polkovnikov and Alexandra Snezhko-Blotskaya and produced at the Soyuzmultfilm studio in Moscow.

Adventures of Nils Holgersson (Nils Holgerssons underbara resa) was released in 1962. It was shot primarily from helicopters, simplifying and downplaying the drama of the plot. It was directed by Kenne Fant.

In the 1960s the Israeli children's weekly "Etzbe'oni" (אצבעוני) ran a long lasting Hebrew comic strip version, loosely based on the Swedish original, where the protagonist's name was changed to "Gil" (גיל) and the location was transferred to the Israeli countryside.

A Japanese animated television-series adaptation, The Wonderful Adventures of Nils (ニルスのふしぎな旅 Nirusu no Fushigi na Tabi), consists of fifty-two 25-minute episodes and was first broadcast on NHK from 8 January 1980 to 17 March 1981. In some countries it was cut to allow for commercials. The series was the first production by Studio Pierrot and Mamoru Oshii was a director on the series. It was mostly fairly true to the original, apart from the appearance of Nils' pet hamster, and the greater role allowed to the fox Smirre. In Germany, the episodes of the series were also combined into one full feature animated film in 1981 and the same release has also been dubbed and released in Estonia on DVD and VHS and in Greece on DVD. In Germany, the anime was also adapted into a comic book series, with the drawings made by the Spanish Studio Interpublic and the German Atelier Roche.

The novel has been the basis for operas composed by Bjørn Kruse (1986) and Andreas N. Tarkmann (2022). It was the basis for the 2024 German musical Die wunderbare Reise des Nils Holgersson with music by Thomas Zaufke and libretto by Henry Mason.

German TV broadcaster ARD premiered a live-action two-part adaptation starring Justus Kammerer as Nils and directed by Dirk Regel on Christmas 2011. Its total running time is 230 minutes. This version uses a mix of real animals, puppets, and CGI for the geese and other animals.

In 2017, a 3D CGI-based TV series adaptation was released by French Studio 100 Animation. The release consists of 52 episodes, 13 minutes each.

== Legacy ==
Illustration by Mary Hamilton Frye

The Wonderful Adventures of Nils is so well known in Swedish culture that a picture of Nils Holgersson, on the back of a goose flying over the plains of Scania, was printed on the reverse side of the Swedish 20 krona banknote until new bills came in use in 2015.

Nils is also depicted in the logo of the digital map company Tele Atlas.

The sights Nils sees as he and his goose roam the provinces of Sweden are depicted in a series of Christmas plates produced by Rörstrand Pottery. The series began in 1970 and continued until 1999. The plates illustrate the topography, architecture, industry, and wildlife of Sweden.

Lev Grossman's fantasy novel The Magicians includes numerous allusions to earlier works such as The Chronicles of Narnia series and the Harry Potter books. The influence of Nils Holgersson is evident in a key episode where a class of students nearing graduation from a School of Magic are set in a major test: to be transformed into wild geese and undertake an epic flight, all the way from Upper New York State to Antarctica.

== See also ==
- Le Tour de la France par deux enfants
- Le Monde's 100 Books of the Century
- List of ornamental plates
