= Ingvar Skogsberg =

Swedish film director

- Born: 16 January 1937 (age 89); Valdemarsvik, Sweden
- Occupations: Film director, screenwriter
- Years active: 1969 - 1976

Ingvar Skogsberg (born 16 January 1937) is a Swedish film director and screenwriter.

== Selected filmography ==
- City of My Dreams (1976)
- Legenden om Svarta Björn (The Legend of Svarta Björn) (1979)
