= Velma Swanston Howard =

American translator

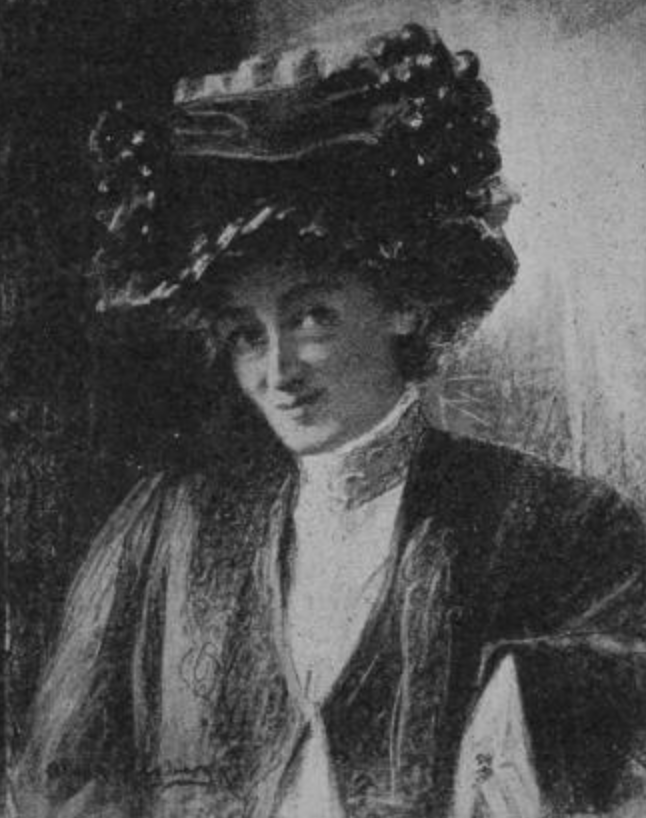
- Velma Swanston Howard, from a 1911 publication
- Born: Velma Swanston; January 24, 1868; Sweden
- Died: March 10, 1937 (aged 69); New York, New York, U.S.
- Other name: Velma S. Howard
- Occupations: Translator, writer, lecturer, suffragist

Velma Swanston Howard (January 24, 1868 – March 10, 1937) was an American translator and writer, best known for translating the works of Selma Lagerlöf and August Strindberg from Swedish into English.

== Early life and education ==
Howard was born in Sweden and raised in the United States. She attended schools in Chicago, and graduated from the Boston School of Oratory in 1888. She studied at the School of Dramatic Art with David Belasco.

== Career ==
Howard translated many works by Swedish writer Selma Lagerlöf into English, including Christ Legends (1908), The Girl from the Marsh Croft (1910), Further Adventures of Nils (1911), The Legend of the Sacred Image (1914), The Emperor of Portugallia (1916), Jerusalem: A Novel (1916), The Holy City: Jerusalem II (1918), Gösta Berling's Saga (1918), Mȧrbacka (1925), and Charlotte Löwensköld (1927).

She also translated works by dramatist August Strindberg, including Lucky Pehr: A Drama in Five Acts and Easter: A Play in Three Acts. She contributed to a Swedish-language newspaper published in the United States, and wrote one short book of her own in Swedish, När Maja-Lisa kom hen från Amerika, encouraging Swedish immigrants in America to consider returning to Sweden.

Howard was also a lecturer, suffragist, pacifist, and Christian Scientist. She was in the cast of a skit presented by the Professional Woman's League of New York in 1900, and played Mary Baker Eddy in a New York City suffrage pageant in 1911.

== Personal life ==
Swanston married Charles Howard. Her husband died in 1917, and she died in 1937, at the age of 69, in New York City, about a month after she suffered a stroke.
