= Anti-Gender Campaigns in Europe =

Book about the anti-gender movement in Europe

Anti-Gender Campaigns in Europe: Mobilizing Against Equality
- Cover of the first edition
- Editor: Roman Kuhar, David Paternotte
- Authors: Roman Kuhar; David Paternotte; Stefanie Mayer; Birgit Sauer; Sarah Bracke; Wannes Dupont; Amir Hodžić; Aleksandar Štulhofer; Michael Stambolis-Ruhstorfer; Josselin Tricou; Paula-Irene Villa; Eszter Kováts; Andrea Pető; Mary McAuliffe; Sinéad Kennedy; Sara Garbagnoli; Agnieszka Graff; Elżbieta Korolczuk; Kevin Moss; Monica Cornejo; José Ignacio Pichardo Galán
- Language: English
- Subjects: Anti-gender movement Gender and religion Right-wing populism
- Publisher: Rowman & Littlefield
- Publication date: 2017
- Media type: Print
- Pages: 292
- ISBN: 9781786600004
- OCLC: 1154685945

Anti-Gender Campaigns in Europe: Mobilizing Against Equality is a book about the anti-gender movement in Europe. It is edited by Roman Kuhar and David Paternotte, who are a sociology professor and associate professor respectively. It was published by Rowman & Littlefield in 2017. According to Social Movement Studies, "each chapter is written by different author(s), with different national and academic backgrounds". Individual chapters focus on a specific country, describing the background context and applications of the anti-gender movement in each.

== Summary ==
Anti-Gender Campaigns in Europe examines the anti-gender movement as it exists in twelve European countries as "case studies": Austria, Belgium, Croatia, France, Germany, Hungary, Ireland, Italy, Poland, Russia, Slovenia, and Spain. The book focuses on the movement's development beginning in the period of the mid-1990s. A number of social issues that the movement concerns itself with in its opposition to "gender" or "gender ideology" are identified, including gay marriage, reproductive rights, gender studies, sex education, and gender identity. According to the book, "gender ideology" is often characterized by the anti-gender movement as a leftist ideology descended from communism.

The book examines how the anti-gender movement has mobilized similarly across various countries, such as its manifestation into a transnational protest movement. It also describes the co-opting of the "social construction of gender" by the anti-gender movement to argue that "gender" is imposed by elites. Additionally, it describes the reaction to this perceived imposition of "gender" by elites, with the anti-gender movement desiring a return to traditional gender roles. It examines a shared set of "universal truths" within the movement, pertaining to sex, gender, and family values.

It explains the relationship between the Catholic Church, the Eastern Orthodox Church, and the anti-gender movement. It argues that the Catholic Church is a more impactful actor within the anti-gender movement in regions where the Catholic Church has more influence. However, the anti-gender movements in Russia and Germany, where the Catholic Church is less influential, are also examined. Whether the Catholic Church is influential in a particular country is found to be impactful on the rhetorical style of the movement. The transnational relationship between the central authority of the Holy See and local Catholic authorities as pertains to mobilizing the anti-gender movement is also examined.

The authors describe the impact of the anti-gender movement on government policy. They examine alliances between far-right movements and religious authorities within the anti-gender movement. The book identifies the rhetoric of the anti-gender movement as populist. It also says that the movement emphasizes "nature, the nation, and normality". The movement is described as hostile to the social policies of the European Union, particularly cultural and family policy. According to the book, the movement perceives the European Union's social policies as infringing on national independence in a "totalitarian" way. The book says that the perceived threat of "gender ideology" is an "empty signifier" that is able to facilitate coalition-building because it has "populist emptiness". This is referred to as a "symbolic glue", bringing together various groups that may not have cooperated under other circumstances, including right-wing populists, religious organizations, and "anti-gender 'scholars'".

== Reception ==
A review in the Journal of Common Market Studies said that the book "provides a superb – and somewhat depressing – tour of anti-gender campaigns in Europe". The review stated that the book is "an important key text for those tackling this research area", but that it "leaves somewhat unanswered the question as to why rather than how".

In a Social Movement Studies review of Anti-Gender Campaigns in Europe, Alica Rétiová wrote that it was "without a doubt very engaging reading" but that there was "not much space devoted to the dynamic between anti-gender mobilization and its opposition". In Andragogic Perspectives, the book was called a "a rich analysis of campaigns and movements against equality".

A review in Feminist Dissent called the book a "valuable contribution to understand the ways the Christian right in Europe operates". It also said that "some of the consideration in the conclusion of the co-editors might have been better placed in their introduction to make an easier read, and help to comprehend the patterns evolving across the different and differing country case studies."

Writing for the Journal of the History of Sexuality, Robert A. Nye said that it was "a very important book for historians of contemporary Europe and for Americans, Britons, and others who have not yet put a name to the new populist movements in their own backyards".

In Politique européenne, Jane Jensen compared and contrasted the book with another title released around the same time about the same topic matter called Varieties of Opposition to Gender Equality in Europe by Mieke Verloo. She says that their definitional differences lead to different research questions, and so, Anti-Gender Campaigns in Europe is placed in the "social movement" literature.

A review of the book for Queer Studies in Media & Pop Culture said that it "present[s] diverse case studies" and "reflects the broad spectrum of geographical and political differences". It called the book "a useful resource to advocates of equality not just in Europe but the world over". However, the review also criticized the book, saying that "the attribution of almost exclusive power to traditional broadcast media as a tool of anti-gender politics" was a "major pitfall" and that "little is said of social media... despite current literature suggesting that social media is the new battleground for political opposition".

In Women, Gender & Research, Molly Occhino called the title "an important contribution and very relevant work to read for anyone working with contemporary European populist movements within history and the social sciences, as well as anyone working within feminist/gender studies in Europe". However, she stated that the book left her "with questions about the national and/or regional specificities of anti-gender movements within the Nordic countries (which were not included in this anthology), especially when taking into consideration the uniqueness of the Nordic welfare state models and ties to Lutheranism rather than Catholicism."

== See also ==
- Gender and politics
- LGBT-free zone
- List of transgender publications
- Sociology of gender
- Who's Afraid of Gender?
