= Ayşe Gül Altınay =

Turkish anthropologist and gender studies scholar

Ayşe Gül Altınay is a Turkish academic working in the disciplines of anthropology, cultural studies, and gender studies, focusing especially on militarism, violence, and memory. She is a professor of anthropology at Sabancı University and director of the university's Gender and Women's Studies Center of Excellence. Altınay stated that "the main question that shapes my work and my life" is "Are we going to turn our pain into more violence, hate, pain and injustice, or into steps that multiply life, beauty, love, peace and justice?" She is a signatory of the Academics for Peace petition "We will not be party to this crime!" and advocates a peaceful resolution of the Kurdish-Turkish conflict.

== Biography ==
Altınay graduated with a degree in Sociology and Political Science from Boğaziçi University in 1994 and a PhD in Cultural Anthropology at Duke University in 2001. She is a professor of anthropology at Sabancı University and director of the university's Gender and Women's Studies Center of Excellence. Her academic research focuses especially on militarism, violence, and memory. Altınay stated that "the main question that shapes my work and my life" is "Are we going to turn our pain into more violence, hate, pain and injustice, or into steps that multiply life, beauty, love, peace and justice?" In 2009, Altınay was a board member of the Hrant Dink Foundation.

== Academics for Peace ==
Altınay signed the Academics for Peace petition "We will not be party to this crime!", advocating a peaceful solution to the Kurdish-Turkish conflict. As a result, she was persecuted for "willingly and knowingly supporting a terrorist organisation as a non-member" and sentenced to 25 months in jail. Altınay denied that she supported terrorism and said that signing the petition was "an act of conscience for a peaceful future shaped by nonviolence, democracy, and human rights law". Altinay was one of the few academics charged in connection with Academics for Peace who was not given a suspended sentence. Academic departments at Central European University, Duke University, Columbia University, London School of Economics, Goethe University Frankfurt, Sciences Po and other universities expressed opposition to the prosecution as did European Journal of Women's Studies. Scholars at Risk stated that it "is concerned about the prosecution of a scholar in apparent retaliation for the nonviolent exercise of the rights to freedom of expression and freedom of association, conduct that is expressly protected under international human rights instruments including the Universal Declaration of Human Rights and the International Covenant on Civil and Political Rights, to which Turkey is a party".

== Academic reception ==
Altınay's 2004 book The Myth of the Military-Nation discussed the role of the military in Turkish civilian life and ideology of militarism as central to Turkish nationhood. Alev Cinar praised it as "a rich and highly informative ethnographic study of the ways in which nationalism and citizenship in Turkey have been pervaded by a discourse and culture of militarism". Rebecca Bryant stated that the book was "analytically sharp and politically brave" and "an important and timely work that addresses one of the problems most central to Turkey's prospects of a European future". Frances Hasso stated that the book was a "rich and compelling study".

== Works ==
- Altınay, Ayşe Gül (2004). The Myth of the Military-Nation: Militarism, Gender, and Education in Turkey. Springer. ISBN 978-1-4039-7936-0.
- Altınay, Ayşe Gül; Arat, Yeşim (2008). Violence Against Women in Turkey: A Nationwide Survey. Punto. ISBN 978-975-01103-7-5.
- Altinay, Ayse Gul; Çetin, Fethiye (2014). The Grandchildren: The Hidden Legacy of 'Lost' Armenians in Turkey. Routledge. ISBN 978-1-351-48198-4.
- Altınay, Ayşe Gül; Pető, Andrea, eds. (2016). Gendered Wars, Gendered Memories: Feminist Conversations on War, Genocide and Political Violence. Routledge. ISBN 978-1-317-12967-7.
- Altınay, Ayşe Gül; Contreras, María José; Hirsch, Marianne; Howard, Jean; Karaca, Banu; Solomon, Alisa (2019). Women Mobilizing Memory. Columbia University Press. ISBN 978-0-231-54997-4.
