= Anti-gender movement =

International movement opposed to the concept of gender identity

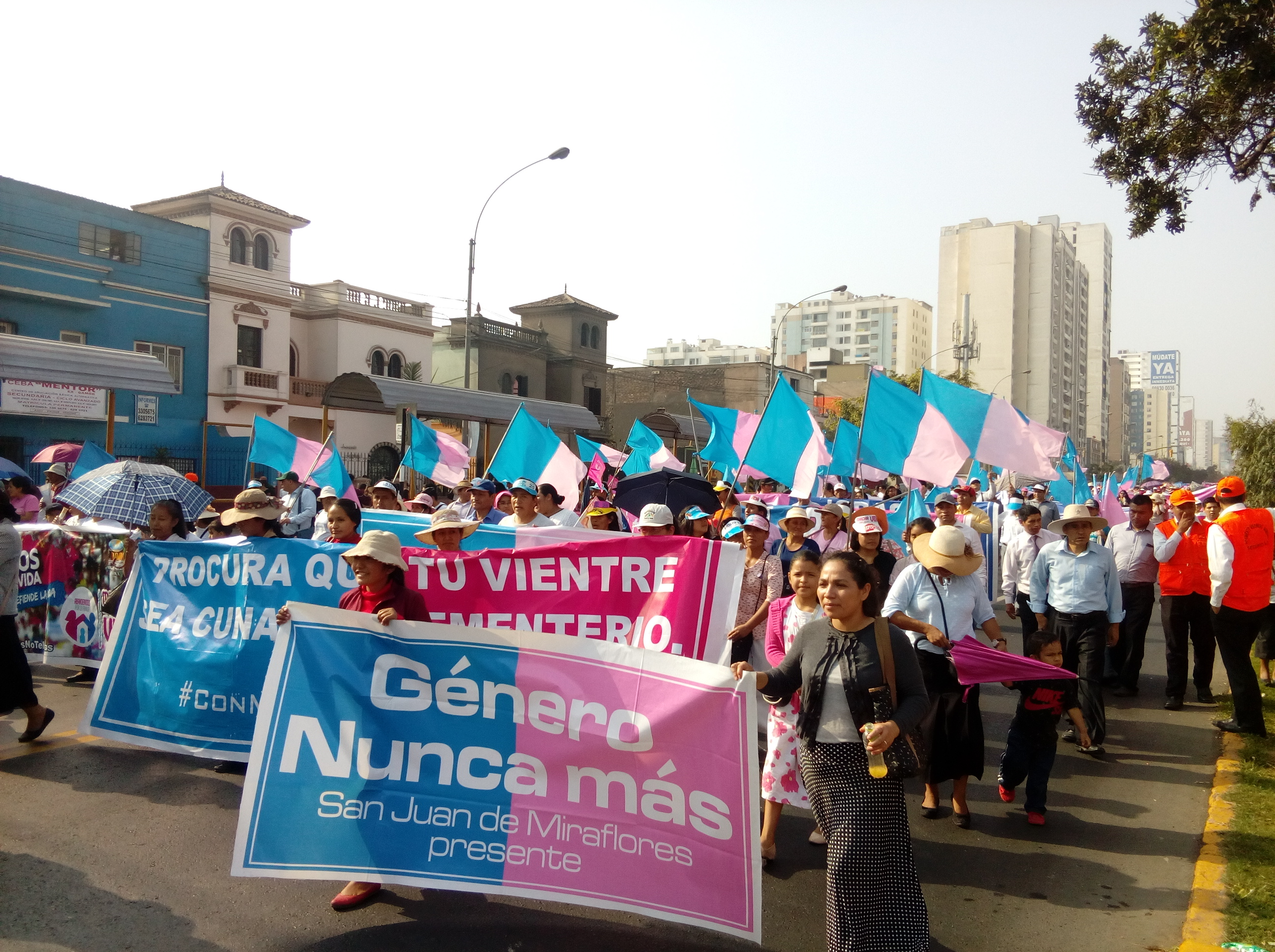
"Gender no more": demonstrators from Con mis hijos no te metas ("Don't mess with my kids") during a pro-life march in Lima, Peru, 2018

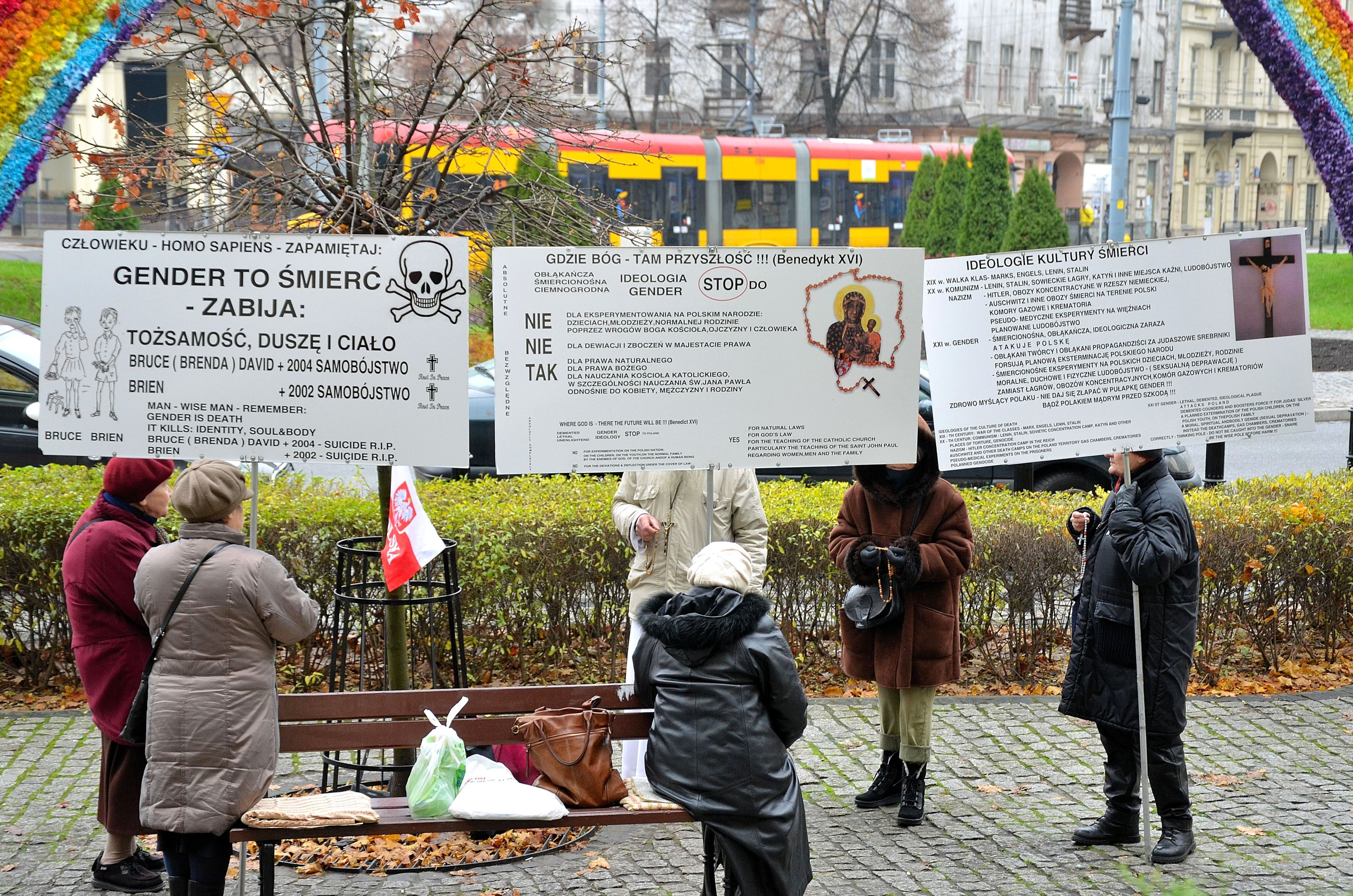
"Gender is death – it kills identity, soul and body": picketing against "gender ideology" in Warsaw, Poland, 2014

The anti-gender movement is a global, mainly right-wing, social movement in opposition to concepts it refers to as "gender ideology" or "gender theory". These terms are loosely defined, and encompass a range of subjects related to feminism and LGBTQ rights, often with opposition to progressivism as a whole. The movement has drawn support from right-wing populist groups, religious conservative organizations, social conservatives, and the far-right worldwide. It views advancement in gender equality and gender and sexual diversity as a threat to traditional family values, religious beliefs, and established social norms.

The movement's beliefs derive from Catholic theology, and its origin can be dated to as early as the 1970s, though it drew greater attention and membership starting in 2012 through public protest. Operating on a transnational scale, the movement engages in political and legislative action targeting various domains, including reproductive rights, inclusive language, same-sex marriage, transgender people, the social constructionist view of gender, and academic disciplines like gender studies. While some parts of the movement focus specifically on opposing LGBTQ rights, others address broader fears about gender-related social changes.

The movement has been criticized for encouraging discrimination, undermining the protection of human rights, and promoting misinformation and rhetoric against LGBTQ people. The notion of a "gender ideology" secretly designed to harm traditional values and social arrangements, of being pervasive, institutionalized, and imposed, has been described as propagandizing moral panic and as exhibiting the characteristics of conspiracy theories.

== Terminology ==
In many non-English-speaking countries, anti-gender activists frequently avoid using local translations of the word gender, opting instead for the English term to imply that gender is an imported or foreign concept. The term gender ideology, central to the anti-gender movement, lacks a consistent or coherent definition and encompasses a wide range of issues. Scholars such as Stefanie Mayer and Birgit Sauer describe it as an "empty signifier", while Agnieszka Graff characterizes it as a catch-all term for ideas opposed by conservative Catholics.

The terms gender ideology, gender theory, and genderism are often used interchangeably by the movement but are distinct from the academic field of gender studies. Within gender studies, substantial debates and disagreements exist; however, these nuances are typically overlooked by anti-gender proponents. Elizabeth Corredor argues that gender ideology functions as both a political and epistemological challenge to emancipatory ideas surrounding gender, sex, and sexuality. Corredor also notes that the anti-gender movement exploits internal divisions within feminist and LGBTQ movements to further its agenda. Peixoto posits that the term gender ideology emerges from the feminist tendency to use gender in place of sex.

The movement accuses a diverse range of individuals and groups of promoting gender ideology. These include politicians, particularly those identified as liberal, green, or leftist; women's rights and LGBTQ activists; gender policy officers in public administration; and academics specializing in gender studies. By framing these actors as proponents of gender ideology, the movement consolidates opposition to gender equity and diversity initiatives.

Anti-gender activists may portray the European Union and other international organizations as manipulated by several lobbies, such as American billionaires, Cultural Marxists, Freemasons, feminists, the LGBTQ lobby, or Jews. Proponents present themselves as defenders of free speech, thought, and conscience against the "gender ideology", which they label as "totalitarian".

Proponents argue that "gender ideology" is pushed by a secret cabal of corrupt elites, or foreign entities such as the European Union, World Health Organization, or United Nations, for the purpose of weakening, undermining, or destroying families, the Catholic Church, the nation, and/or Western civilization. The term has been adopted by Donald Trump and was used in Executive Order 14168, titled "Defending Women from Gender Ideology Extremism and Restoring Biological Truth to the Federal Government", which seeks to erase official federal recognition of transgender people and reverse transgender protections.

The term gender ideology originated within the Catholic Church in the 1990s. Mary Anne Case writes that the term gender ideology entered Catholic Church usage in conjunction with the 1995 World Conference on Women, and, in particular, activist Dale O'Leary's pamphlet "Gender: The Deconstruction of Women/Analysis of the Gender Perspective in Preparation for the Fourth World Conference on Women", which was presented to Pope Benedict XVI. O'Leary herself was inspired by Christina Hoff Sommers's book Who Stole Feminism?. The term then came into common usage among churches in Latin America, as well as the World Congress of Families.

Pope Francis stated that "gender ideology" would undermine the Catholic Church's position on gender complementarity, comparing it to nuclear weapons, and said it was one of the "Herods that destroy, that plot designs of death, that disfigure the face of man and woman, destroying creation". In 2019, the Catholic Church released the first major document dealing specifically with "gender ideology", which states that there are only two biologically determined genders or sexes. According to Corredor,

the Holy See's perspective deeply depends on a stable and predictably correlated relationship between biological sex, gender identity, and heterosexual orientation, which is expressed in the Catholic Church's terms as the one and only natural unity of mind, body, and soul. Because this unity is believed to be rooted within natural and divine law—as a direct creation of God—it transcends political, historical, and social arrangements shaped by man.

== Origins ==
=== International conferences in the mid-1990s ===
The origins of the anti-gender movement have often been traced to discussions within the Catholic Church in the 1990s. These discussions were a response to the outcomes of the United Nations' 1994 International Conference on Population and Development and the 1995 World Conference on Women, during which the UN began formally recognizing sexual and reproductive rights. The Holy See expressed concern that such recognition could lead to the classification of abortion as a human right, the erosion of traditional motherhood, and the normalization of homosexuality. Within this context, the term gender was perceived by the Holy See as a strategy to challenge and destabilize the "natural family".

In 1997, American activist Dale O'Leary, associated with Opus Dei and known for her anti-abortion stance, published a book titled The Gender Agenda. In the book, O'Leary likened the concept of gender to a covert operation, stating: "the Gender Agenda sails into communities not as a tall ship, but as a submarine, determined to reveal as little of itself as possible." The theological basis for the Catholic Church's opposition to gender theory was rooted in John Paul II's theology of the body, which emphasized the complementary and distinct roles of the sexes.

While the conceptual framework of the anti-gender movement was established by 2003, visible protests associated with the movement began emerging in European countries around 2012–2013. By 2019, the movement had expanded beyond its Catholic origins, gaining broader support within right-wing political circles, although Catholic actors remain significant proponents.

=== 1980s Church origins ===
Researcher Mary Anne Case traces the origins of the anti-gender movement to the early 1980s, during the tenure of Cardinal Joseph Ratzinger, who later became Pope Benedict XVI. At that time, Ratzinger observed the popularity of feminist literature in Germany that argued gender was socially constructed. Additionally, he noted changes in German law allowing transgender individuals to legally change their gender, developments that drew Vatican scrutiny. Case contends that claims for transgender rights, alongside feminist advocacy, were foundational concerns for the Vatican regarding gender. These issues were not recent additions but central to the Church's focus on the influence of secular legal developments related to gender.

== Later developments ==
=== Trans-exclusionary radical feminism or gender-critical feminism ===
Scholars Serena Bassi and Greta LaFleur observe that the trans-exclusionary radical feminist (TERF) movement and the anti-gender movement are rarely treated as distinct, despite their differing origins and objectives. Research by Pearce, Erikainen, and Vincent notes that the term gender ideology, historically central to the anti-gender movement, began to gain traction within TERF discourse around 2016.

Claire Thurlow argues that gender-critical feminism often relies on transphobic tropes, moral panics, and essentialist views of men and women. These characteristics, she contends, align trans-exclusionary feminism with anti-feminist reactionary politics and other anti-gender movements. Judith Butler has characterized the anti-gender ideology movement as a neo-fascist phenomenon and has warned leftist individuals and groups against aligning with it. Scholars have highlighted the movement's distinctive nature compared to traditional forms of anti-feminism. Andrea Pető describes it as a "fundamentally new phenomenon" aimed at reshaping global sociopolitical orders.

This overlap of rhetoric and strategies highlights the connections between trans-exclusionary feminism and broader anti-gender campaigns, despite their differing ideological foundations.

Scholars have highlighted the promotion of gender-critical positions within legal arenas as part of the broader anti-gender movement, citing Reem Alsalem as a prominent example.

=== Foreign influence ===
A 2021 report commissioned by the European Parliament identified a connection between the rise of the anti-gender movement in Europe and funding from disinformation campaigns. These campaigns were supported in large part by Russia, as well as far-right and Christian right groups. The report highlighted that the Russian government's geopolitical strategy includes fostering alliances with like-minded groups and deliberately destabilizing the European Union (EU). This strategy involves backing right-wing factions within the EU to amplify dissent and undermine cohesion.

== Central figures and issues ==
Key proponents of the anti-gender movement include Dale O'Leary, Michel Schooyans, Tony Anatrella, Gabriele Kuby, and Marguerite Peeters.

Members of the anti-gender movement oppose some reproductive rights, particularly abortion, as well as LGBTQ rights, especially same-sex marriage, along with some campaigns against gender-related violence. They may also campaign against anti-bullying programs, sex education in schools, and gender studies in higher education. According to Kováts, not all the movements fitting under the "anti-gender" label (by opposing "gender" or "gender ideology") are overtly anti-feminist or anti-LGBTQ, and the anti-gender movement is a novel phenomenon distinct from previous anti-feminism and homophobia. The anti-gender movement is not synonymous with the far-right, as not all far-right movements espouse anti-gender views, and anti-gender themes extend beyond the far-right.

=== Inclusive language ===
Anti-gender movements often target inclusive language as part of broader efforts to resist progressive gender policies. Beck notes, in the German-speaking countries, that gender-inclusive language "is a trigger point for 'anti-gender' attacks" and frames the opposition as "an important aspect of a broader political 'crusade' against gender, interlinking far-right political mobilization with conservative and liberal groups in German society" that can be regarded as a "discursive bridge between these groups". Lucy Jones writes, in her review of scholarly literature on language, gender, and sexuality, that anti-gender and gender-critical actors often resist the adoption of inclusive and nonbinary language, particularly in relation to pronouns and the recognition of transgender and nonbinary identities. Jones notes that gender-critical feminists frequently reject linguistic practices that affirm trans and nonbinary identities, often citing the preservation of "sex-based rights" as justification. She observes that this resistance is typically framed by a binary and essentialist ideology that defines "woman" exclusively as someone assigned female at birth. Drawing on this scholarship, Jones characterizes resistance to inclusive language as part of a broader "cisnormative preoccupation with trans people's bodies" and a form of linguistic policing aimed at denying the legitimacy of trans and nonbinary identities. Jones situates these discursive patterns within a wider political context by citing Borba (2022), who examines the emergence of an "anti-gender register" used in trans-exclusionary discourse, including gender-critical feminism. Borba argues that this register, which draws on essentialist ideas about sex and gender, has gained traction through a process of enregisterment, a way of making certain ideological positions appear natural or commonsensical. He further suggests that this has been achieved in part by appropriating the language of feminist and LGBTQ antidiscrimination activism, reframing it to emphasize threats to the rights of cisgender women and children.

== Related movements ==
The anti-gender movement is closely related to right-wing populism, nationalism, and the Christian right. According to Kuhar and Paternotte, "anti-gender campaigns are [not] the direct consequence of the right-wing populist wave, but the shift towards the Right reinforces these campaigns and provides them with new supporters who took over a concept of 'gender ideology' which shares some ideological structures with right-wing populist ideology". In line with their populist framing, referendums are often used to secure the outcomes desired by the anti-gender movement.

== Analyses and responses ==
UN Women has described the anti-gender movement as framing "equality for women and LGBTIQ+ people as a threat to so-called 'traditional' family values [...] to new extremes" and that "use hateful propaganda and disinformation to target and attempt to delegitimize people with diverse sexual orientations, gender identities, gender expressions, and sex characteristics."

=== Backlash or proactive movement ===
It is disputed the extent to which the anti-gender movement is a reaction to events and other movements, or a proactive movement attempting to create social change. Hande Eslen-Ziya argues that the anti-gender movement relies on what she calls "troll science", that she describes as "(distorted) scientific arguments moulded into populist discourse, creating an alternative narrative on the conceptions of gender equality".

An EU-funded research project into the anti-gender movement titled RESIST examined anti-gender rhetoric in parliamentary debates and media coverage in Hungary, Poland and the United Kingdom, and found that key actors in promoting and perpetuating anti-gender politics are primarily "men in the conservative and radical/extreme right in Europe", and that media played a role in "deliberately stoking up a damaging moral panic targeting transgender identities" that makes transgender people the subject of "relentless 'debate' about the legitimacy of their rights and lives".

According to Marta Rawłuszko, the anti-gender movement is, in part, a backlash against the devolution of power from democratically elected national governments to unelected equality bodies and international organizations, such as the European Union, which demand changes. Because these policies are not approved by voters or their elected representatives, they generate a democratic deficit. She notes that "gender equality policies have been implemented without engaging a wider audience or public debate".

However, Paternotte argues that picturing the anti-gender movement as a "backlash" is "conceptually flawed, empirically weak and politically problematic", because comparative research has shown that in different countries, the anti-gender activism is "sparked by extremely different issues".

=== Conspiracism ===
At one point, the idea of gender ideology has been described as a moral panic or conspiracy theory. According to two political psychologists writing for The Conversation, the conspiracy theory contributed to a debate in Poland in 2020 about "whether the coronavirus pandemic is a punishment for gender theory". An Ipsos survey in October 2019 found that a plurality of Polish men under 40 believe that "the LGBT movement and gender ideology" is the "biggest threat facing them in the 21st century". Many regard postgenderism as gender theory.

=== Neoliberalism and liberal democracy ===
The emergence and success of anti-gender movements is considered by political scientist Eszter Kováts to be a symptom of a deeper underlying socioeconomic, political, and cultural crisis of liberal democracy and a reaction to neoliberalism. Similarly, political scientist Birgit Sauer refers to these movements as, among other things, a reaction to deregulation, precarization of labor, the erosion of the welfare state and the widening of the gap between the rich and poor. In the journal LuXemburg in 2018, sociologist Weronika Grzebalska and political scientists Eszter Kováts and Andrea Pető analyze the term gender as the "symbolic glue" of the anti-gender movement, which unites different political and religious actors who would otherwise not cooperate with each other. They view the "gender ideology" that these actors mobilize against as a metaphor for the insecurity and unfairness produced by the neoliberal socioeconomic order.

Those said to support gender ideology are delegitimized, negating pluralism and undermining liberal democracy, in a similar way to the far-right. Lorena Sosa, assistant professor at the Netherlands Institute of Human Rights (SIM), states that the anti-gender movement has challenged human rights, such as protection from violence against women, and contributed to democratic erosion.

Pető argues that "The anti-gender movement is not merely another offshoot of centuries-old anti-feminism... The anti-gender movement is a fundamentally new phenomenon that was launched to establish a new world order." She also argues that the movement "is saturated with hatred"—citing online harassment against gender researchers—and argues that it "attacks liberalism and therefore democracy". In 2021 the philosopher Judith Butler described the anti-gender movement as a fascist trend and cautioned self-declared feminists against allying with such movements in targeting trans, non-binary, and genderqueer people.

The Canadian Security Intelligence Service said in 2024 that the "anti-gender movement" poses a threat of "extreme violence" that could target the LGBTQ community. In 2023, Elżbieta Korolczuk argued that "while the activities of the anti-gender movement are generally non-violent, its discursive strategies and campaigns should be further analysed as possible conveyor belt to engagement in violent extremism".

=== LGBTQ rights and gender equality ===
Marie Wittenius of the Gunda Werner Institute for feminism and gender democracy argues that the term "gender ideology" "functions as a broad projection area for racism, anti-Semitism, homophobia and transphobia, ethnicnationalist ideas as well as hostility towards elites."

In August 2021 the Council of Europe Commissioner for Human Rights Dunja Mijatović said the anti-gender movement was "instrumentalising existing societal prejudices and verbally attacking LGBTI people to achieve political objectives for their own benefit" and said the targeting of "LGBTI people for political gain is a costly strategy which harms the lives and well-being of those affected and undermines social cohesion in general." The Commissioner said that "by permeating the political scene, the anti-gender movements are increasingly well-placed to erode the protection of human rights in Europe" and concluded that "by standing up for LGBTI people, we defend the equal human dignity of all, protect our societies' wellbeing and the strength of our precious human rights system."

In February 2022, the European Parliament Committee on Women's Rights and Gender Equality organised a public hearing on "Countering the anti-gender movement", highlighting the anti-gender movement as a threat to gender equality.

In March 2024, philosopher Judith Butler published their book titled Who's Afraid of Gender? after being attacked at an airport in São Paulo by "anti-gender" protesters in 2017. Butler uses the phrase "anti-gender ideology movement" to describe the transnational phenomenon of far-right actors turning "gender ideology" into a "psychosocial fantasy" that plays into anxieties and fears surrounding the "traditional family".

In 2024, the Canadian Security Intelligence Service said that the anti-gender movement could result in a threat of violence carried out by extremists against the LGBTQ community.

== By region ==
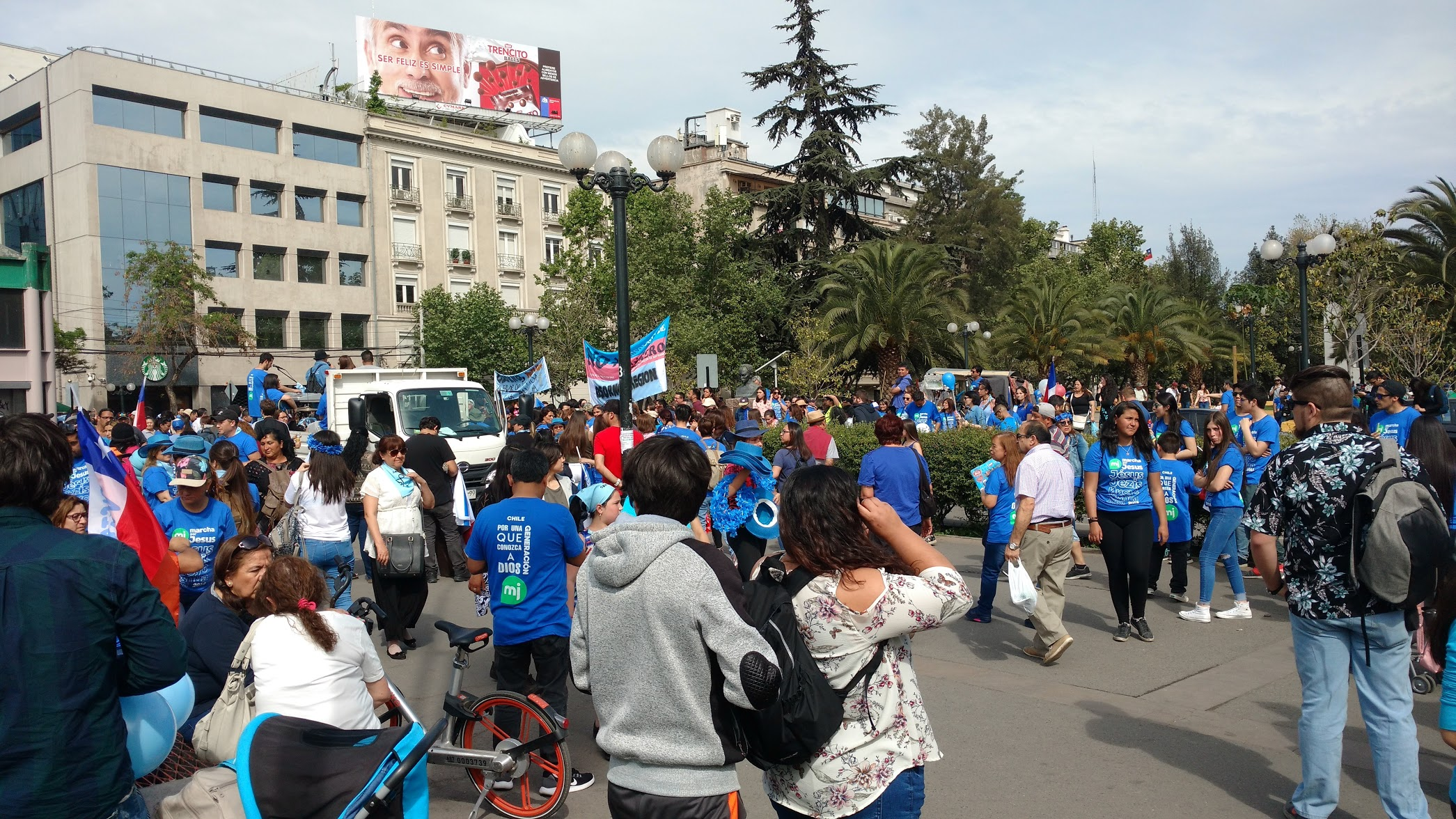
"Marcha contra la Ideología de Género" or "Marcha por Jesús" in Chile, 27 October 2018

The anti-gender movement emerged in Europe in the early 2010s and, as of 2019, was making headway in Latin America. The movement is transnational, with campaigns in different countries borrowing strategies and rhetoric from other countries. However, in individual countries the anti-gender movement overlaps with appeals to nationalism and national sovereignty.

=== Europe ===
Before the emergence of the anti-gender movement, activists and scholars believed that Europe was on an inexorable course towards complete gender equality and full LGBTQ rights, serious opposition to which was deemed a holdover from the past or else a phenomenon confined to Eastern Europe and Roman Catholic countries. The anti-gender movement proved this perception to be incorrect. Since the 1990s, the European Commission has made eligibility for funding from the Structural Funds and Cohesion Fund conditional on local gender equality policies, which led to rapid changes after Poland joined the European Union in 2004.

In February 2019, the European Parliament passed a resolution against the "backlash in women's rights and gender equality in the EU".

==== Bulgaria ====
In February 2023, the Bulgarian Socialist Party called for a national referendum on "Gender Ideology". Later in the month, the party praised a Supreme Court ruling that only biological sex can be listed on government documents and that it could not be changed.

==== Croatia ====
In 2012, the SDP-led Croatian government proposed Health Education as a new mandatory school subject in Croatian schools. The program of the school subject was heavily criticized by the Croatian Bishops' Conference and other conservative or religious associations such as GROZD for introducing what they called "gender ideology" and "homosexualism" to Croatian schools.

In 2017, the Croatian government led by the centre-right HDZ announced that it would ratify the Council of Europe Convention on Preventing and Combating Violence Against Women and Domestic Violence, better known as the Istanbul Convention. While lauded by women's rights associations, this move caused intense criticism from the Croatian Bishop's Conference, the Catholic Church, and various conservative and right-wing figures and associations such as U ime obitelji, for being a convention that supposedly fights violence against women while "secretly introducing gender ideology" to Croatian legislature. This was explained by the critics due to the convention text using the terms gender and gender identity in certain sentences, although there had been multiple Croatian laws dating back to at least 2008 already using these terms. Later that year, a citizens' initiative called "The Truth about the Istanbul Convention" (Istina o Istanbulskoj) was founded with the aim of "explaining to Croatian citizens the true purpose" of the convention, which was supposedly about "gender ideology" and an "attack on Croatian, Catholic, and family values". The initiative organized protests and rallies in Zagreb and in Split, attended by around 15 thousand people. The initiative aimed to organize a referendum for citizens to decide whether the convention should be ratified, but failed to collect enough signatures required to hold a referendum. Croatian LGBTQ association Trans Aid sued the initiative for discriminating against transgender people in their communication.

In April 2018, the Croatian parliament voted in favor of ratifying the Istanbul Convention. Signing the convention has been a major factor in the rise of political parties on the further right-wing in Croatia in 2020s, such as The Bridge (Most) and Homeland Movement (Domovinski pokret), who took the most conservative voters away from HDZ. The members of these two parties often criticize and attack the "gender ideology", transgender individuals, LGBTQ rights, and the Istanbul Convention in their speeches.

==== France ====
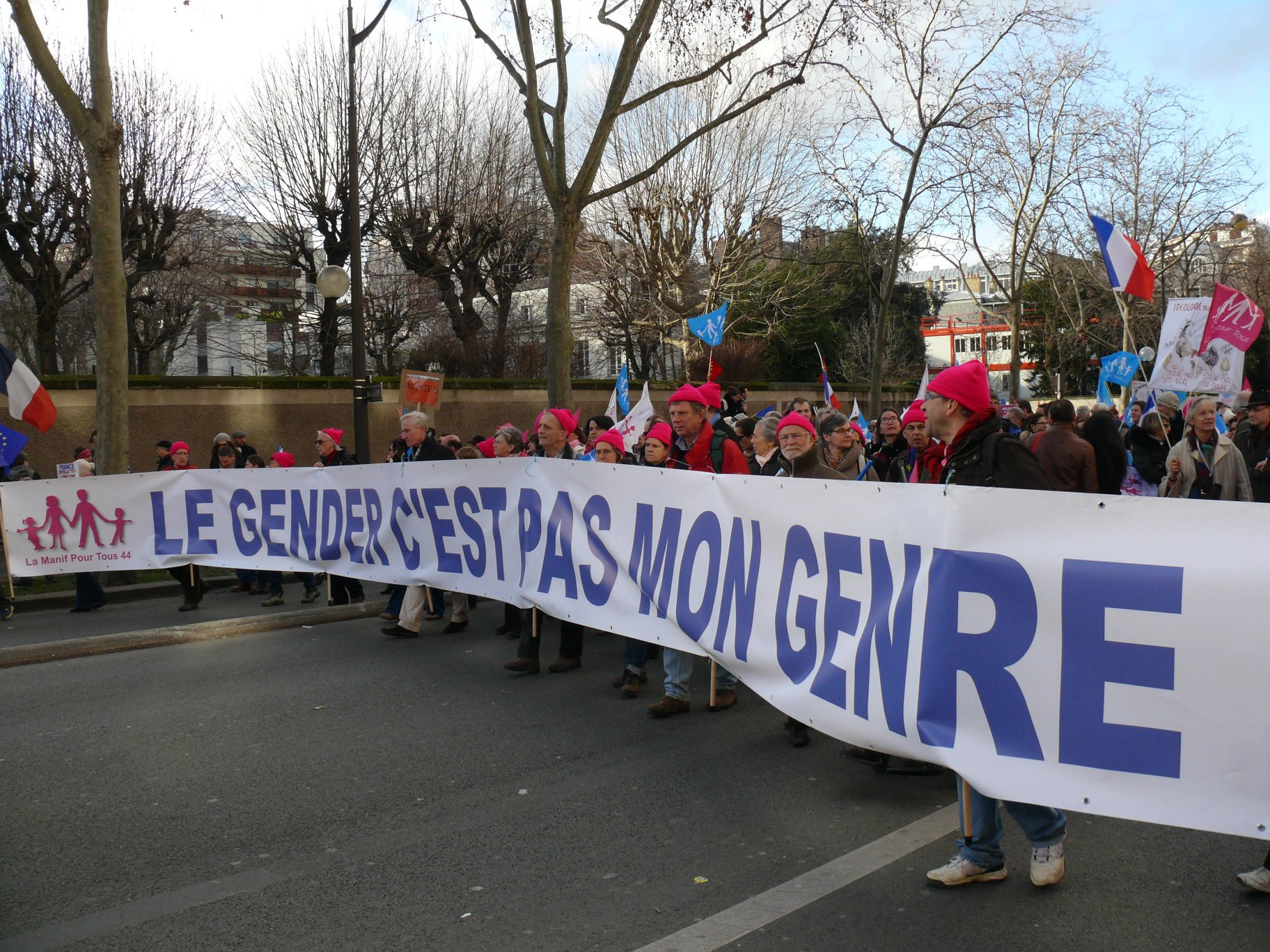
"Le gender, c'est pas mon genre" (gender is not my gender / gender, that is not my kind of thing), demonstration of La Manif pour tous in Paris, 2 February 2014

The anti-gender movement in France is spearheaded by Farida Belghoul and La Manif pour tous (LMPT), a protest movement which originated in early 2013 to oppose same-sex marriage in France and pivoted to opposing equality curricula after same-sex marriage was legalized in May 2013. The anti-gender movement in France has spread false rumors and hoaxes, such as the claim that masturbation is being taught in French kindergartens.

==== Germany ====
In Germany, right-wing extremists and right-wing populists mobilized against the concept of "gender madness", (Note: German: Genderwahn, rendered in numerous English sources as gender madness.) which was characterized as a "weapon" against "the German people" in a 2013 call by neo-Nazis.

Even outside the extreme right, there has been critical discussion of gender mainstreaming since 2006, when Eva Herman commented on the role of women in society and the Frankfurter Allgemeine Zeitung debated "political gender reassignment". Right-wing extremists used this as a prelude to a targeted campaign against gender mainstreaming.

The far-right German political party, AfD (Alternative für Deutschland), displays its alignment with the anti-gender movement in its "Key Points for Germany" brochure. In the brochure, the AfD positions itself against post-secondary gender studies programs, "gender-mainstreaming", and the discussion of sexuality at early ages in school. The AfD further illustrates its anti-gender position in its 2017 "Manifesto for Germany", stating that "[g]ender ideology, early sexualisation, governmental funding of gender studies, quota systems and the deprivation of the German language with gender-conforming words have to be terminated". The AfD has organized anti-gender rallies in cities such as Munich in 2023, emphasizing the perceived threat of "gender propaganda" towards children. The anti-gender movement has proven key to the rapid rise of the AfD, with the party projecting the protection of the "traditional family" as key to its platform.

Since 2013, the fundamentalist Christian protest alliance Demo für Alle (Note: Named after the French group La Manif pour tous ("protest for all"), which in turn was named after the expression mariage pour tous ("marriage for all") used in France as a popular name for same sex marriage.) has mobilized against same-sex marriage and gender mainstreaming. At a Demo für Alle rally in 2014, journalist Birgit Kelle exclaimed that the German state "grabs for the children to sexualize and reeducate them", playing into the notion of a loss of "parental rights" in educating their own children that the AfD has also used more recently.

==== Hungary ====
According to Eszter Kováts and Andrea Pető, writing in 2017, there was "no significant anti-gender movement" in the country, but "a palpable anti-gender discourse", especially in the later 2010s, which to date had only sporadically intersected with the national public debate. They write that the Hungarian anti-gender discourse emerged in 2008, when a textbook was published that was criticized by a Fidesz MP. The politician said that the textbook contained "gender ideology" and that "the greatest danger of this trend is that society will lose its sexual identity". In politics, the anti-gender discourse first attained prominence in 2010, when the left-wing government inserted a sentence into the national curriculum stating that early childhood educators should "deliberately avoid any strengthening of gender stereotypes and facilitate the dismantling of the prejudices concerning the social equality of genders". Right-wing media gave the change much coverage; it was alleged to promote "gender ideology".

==== Italy ====
Under Giorgia Meloni, who was elected prime-minister in 2022 Italian general election, the far-right Italian political party, Fratelli d'Italia (Brothers of Italy), has placed gender front and centre in its politics. Meloni has frequently emphasized the importance of upholding the gender binary and traditionalist values surrounding family, tying such issues to the protection of the Italian state and religious apparati. At a 2019 rally, Meloni proclaimed: "I am Giorgia, I am a woman, I am a mother, I am Italian, I am Christian." Meloni employs her position as a mother situate herself as the "harbinger of a conservative, yet modern, nation" while playing up the need to shelter the "natural family" from the threat of "gender ideology".

Anti-gender in Italy has been sponsored by Lega Nord party as well as the groups Pro Vita (associated with the neo-fascist party New Force) and Manif pour Tous Italia, later called Generazione Famiglia. In the 2018 Italian general election, Lega Nord placed members of Catholic organizations on its electoral lists, sealing an anti-gender alliance.

==== Lithuania ====
The 2020 Lithuanian parliamentary elections and the formation of coalition between the Homeland Union and Freedom Party, which shares a positive stance on LGBTQ-related policies, led to the formation of anti-gender movements such as the Lithuanian Family Movement and political parties like the National Alliance.

==== Norway ====
Gender studies scholar Elisabeth L. Engebretsen has identified groups such as the Norwegian branch of Women's Declaration International and LLH2019, a self-declared sister organization of LGB Alliance, as key anti-gender actors in Norway. According to Engebretsen, these groups are part of a "complex threat to democracy".

Gender studies scholar Janne Bromseth wrote that the 2022 Oslo shooting "happened in a context" and that "the anti-gender movement has also shifted boundaries in the public debate in Norway in recent years," resulting in "a harsher climate of debate where primarily organized TERFs have been given space to set the agenda for the 'debate on gender' and the alleged threat of 'gender ideology' to the natural order."

==== Poland ====
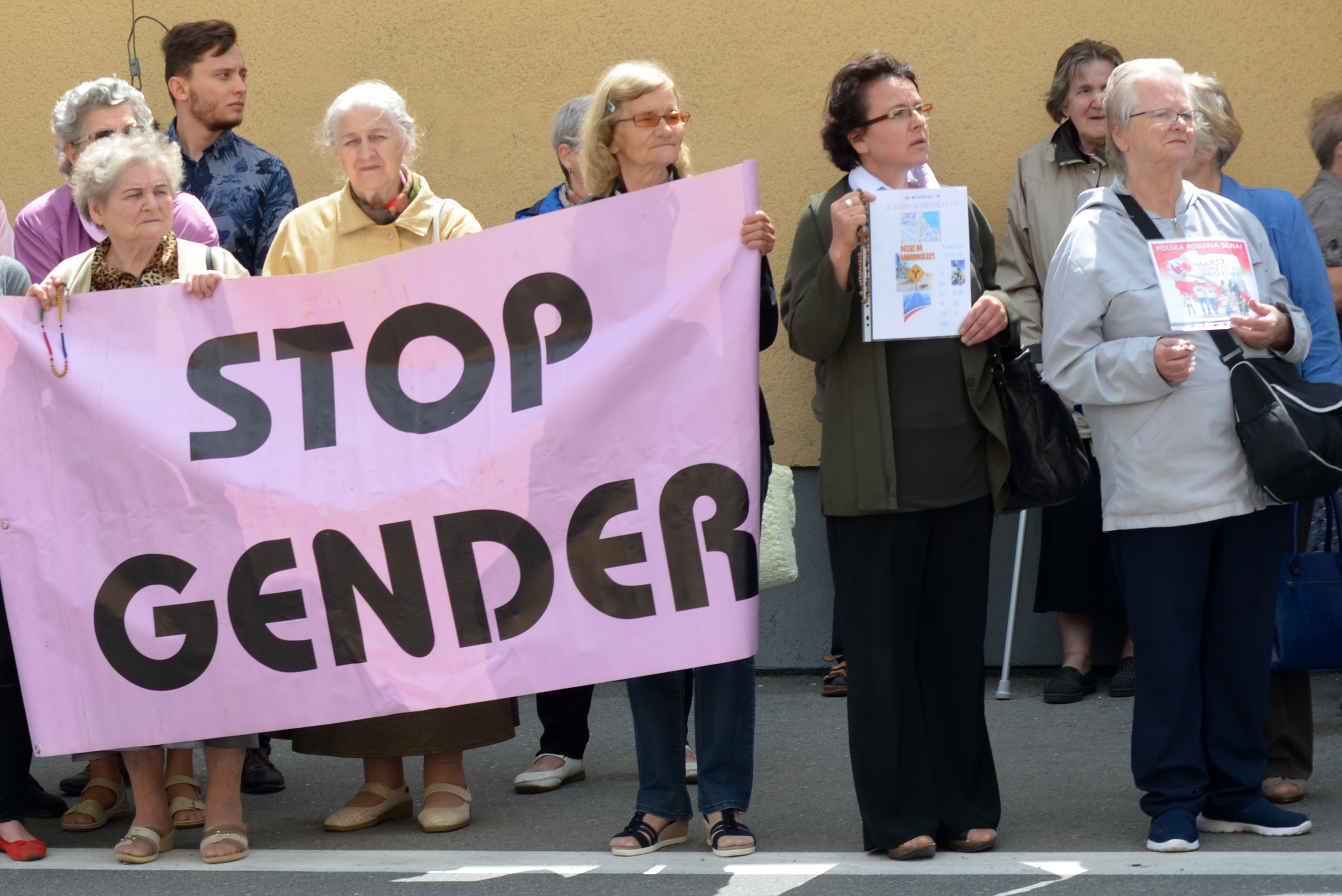
Catholic anti-LGBTQ protesters during the 2018 equality march in Rzeszów, Poland

In late 2013, the term gender, which had been confined to academic discourse, became popularized as part of an anti-gender campaign by the right-wing and the Catholic Church. The campaign against "gender ideology" was promoted by the national-conservative Law and Justice party which ruled Poland between 2015 and 2023, by the Catholic Church's hierarchy, and more radically nationalist groups with which Law and Justice had a fluid boundary: All-Polish Youth, the National Rebirth of Poland, and the National-Radical Camp. In 2019, sociologists Piotr Żuk and Paweł Żuk wrote that: "The right in Poland perceives both feminist and homosexual circles as a threat to the national identity associated with the Catholic religion and as a threat to the traditional family model and social order." Anti-LGBTQ rhetoric from the Polish right increased following the conclusion of the 2015 European migrant crisis, during which anti-migrant rhetoric was prominent. With anti-gender rhetoric, the LGBTQ community served as the scapegoat or demonized enemy required by populist politics.

A 2020 survey of a representative sample of 1,000 Poles found that 30% believed in the existence of a gender conspiracy, "defined as a secret plan to destroy Christian tradition partly by taking control over public media". The survey found that belief in the gender conspiracy did not correlate with religiosity; it was strongly associated with the belief that the Catholic Church should occupy a privileged position in society and rejection of LGBTQ people as neighbors. Marta Rawłuszko suggests that Polish people may be prone to finding conspiracies because of the actual plots during communist rule. In June 2020, Polish president Andrzej Duda of Law and Justice drew attention when he called LGBTQ an "ideology" and a form of "neo-Bolshevism", ahead of the 2020 Polish presidential election.

==== Russia ====
Russian President Vladimir Putin views gender as an "ideological construction" created by Western Europe, playing into the complex meanings of the Russian derogatory term, Gayrope. The term invokes the idea that Western European civilization is facing decadence and decay, symbolized in the dissolution of traditional gender binaries triumphed by contemporary LGBTQ movements and queer mainstreaming, and that entities like the European Union are attempting to impose these foreign values upon Russian culture.

==== Sweden ====
Sweden has increasingly seen the influence of anti-gender campaigns. Scholars have documented how Sweden, despite its reputation as a gender-equal country, is increasingly affected by what has been termed "insidious de-democratization", a process in which small but cumulative political and discursive shifts erode liberal democratic norms by marginalizing already vulnerable groups such as trans people, migrants, and racialized minorities.

Anti-gender rhetoric in Sweden is promoted by a range of actors, including the far-right Sweden Democrats and Christian Democrats, who have opposed legal reforms strengthening transgender rights. These parties frame their opposition in terms of protecting women's rights and Swedish values. At the same time, anti-gender views have also gained ground among some radical feminist groups that identify as "gender-critical". One prominent example is the Swedish Women's Lobby (SWL), which in recent years has been criticized by scholars and civil society groups for adopting trans-exclusionary positions. In 2025, SWL launched the Women's Platform for Action International (WoPAI), an international network promoting "sex-based rights" and opposing what it calls a "pro-gender movement", a "queer agenda" and the concept of gender identity.

Research shows that these anti-gender efforts in Sweden target not only legal rights but also knowledge production, including gender studies and intersectional feminist scholarship, which are often labeled as ideological or unscientific by critics. The opposition frequently draws on arguments about safeguarding "rationality" and "science" and sometimes mirrors narratives associated with international far-right and populist movements. The increasing normalization of anti-gender discourse has also coincided with growing political violence and intimidation, particularly directed at trans advocates, feminist scholars, and racialized activists. This includes online harassment, threats, and public vilification. Researchers argue that such violence, both symbolic and physical, plays a central role in silencing dissent and undermining democratic participation.

=== North America ===
==== Canada ====
In 2023, a series of anti-LGBTQ protests, titled the "1 Million March 4 Children", occurred in various cities throughout Canada. Protesters advocated to remove "pronouns, gender ideology and mixed bathrooms" from educational environments, and claimed that children were exposed to "inappropriate" topics regarding sexuality and gender identity. At least 63 counter-protests were planned or carried out in response to the march. On 19 September 2023, an educational union in Ontario had three offices vandalized with anti-LGBTQ messages. In response to the march, various school boards in Ontario expressed their support for LGBTQ schoolchildren, staff, and families. In Ottawa, two protesters were arrested for "inciting hatred" by "displaying hateful material". Another person was arrested for disturbance. The protests were condemned by Ottawa mayor Mark Sutcliffe, as well as cities such as Whitehorse.

==== United States ====
In 2021, there was a march in Puerto Rico against the introduction of a "Gender Perspective curriculum" in public schools that was created under former Governor Alejandro García Padilla and being enacted under Governor Pedro Pierluisi. Marchers said they opposed "Gender Ideology". Speakers included Bishop Daniel Fernández Torres, political scientist Agustín Laje, and other religious leaders.

=== Latin America ===
==== Brazil ====
Former President of Brazil Jair Bolsonaro has characterized "gender ideologists" as a force that is opposed to conservative Christianity. He has also said that he wants to ban "gender ideology in schools".

A 2026 report showed that there were 271 unconstitutional laws processed in the legislative houses of Santa Catarina against women's rights or LGBTQ rights as of 2025 since 2015. About 70% involve the trans and travesti community. The data were gathered by the office of the councilor of Florianópolis Leonel Camasão (PSOL), it reported proposals from the Legislative Assembly of the State of Santa Catarina (Alesc) and municipal councils. 41% of the topics were ruled as unconstitutional by STF.

==== Colombia ====
During the 2016 Colombian peace agreement referendum, evangelical Christian groups and right-wing politicians who opposed the peace agreement argued that protections for LGBTQ people in the treaty were "an instrument to impose gender ideology". This helped motivate much of the evangelical electorate to oppose the agreement, which was ultimately rejected by voters, 50.22% (No) to 49.78% (Yes).

=== Middle East ===
==== Iraq ====
In 2023, the Iraqi government issued an order officially prohibiting media from using the word "gender". It also mandated that the word "homosexuality" be avoided, in favor of "sexual deviance".

==== Turkey ====
The government has supported the anti-LGBTQ marches entitled "The Great Family Meeting," by airing public statements on national media. The state also suppresses pride parades.

Among the main sources of anti-gender action are religious congregations in Turkey. All major parties of the governing Cumhur İttifakı political alliance, as well as many prominent members of the opposition parties, also engage in anti-gender rhetoric.

== See also ==
- Anti-Gender Campaigns in Europe – a non-fiction book about the movement
- Anti-transgender movement in the United Kingdom
- Christianity and transgender people
- Discrimination against non-binary people
- Gender and politics
- Gender empowerment
- Homosexuality and religion
- Identity politics
- Societal attitudes toward homosexuality
- Transgender disenfranchisement in the United States

== Sources ==
- Bellè, Elisa; Poggio, Barbara (2018). "New faces of populism: the Italian 'anti-gender' mobilization" (PDF). In Kovala, Urpo; Palonen, Emilia; Ruotsalainen, Maria; Saresma, Tuija (eds.). Populism on the loose. Nykykulttuurin tutkimuskeskuksen julkaisuja. ISBN 978-951-39-7401-5.
- Butler, Judith (2024). Who's Afraid of Gender? (First ed.). New York, NY: Farrar, Straus and Giroux. ISBN 978-0-374-60822-4.
- Donà, Alessia (2020). "The populist Italian Lega from ethno-regionalism to radical right-wing nationalism: backsliding gender-equality policies with a little help from the anti-gender movement". European Journal of Politics and Gender. 3 (1): 161–163. doi:10.1332/251510819X15657567135115. S2CID 202306955.
- Careaga-Pérez, Gloria (2016). "Moral Panic and Gender Ideology in Latin America". Religion and Gender. 6 (2): 251–255. doi:10.18352/rg.10174.
- Corredor, Elizabeth S. (2019). "Unpacking 'Gender Ideology' and the Global Right's Antigender Countermovement". Signs: Journal of Women in Culture and Society. 44 (3): 613–638. doi:10.1086/701171. S2CID 150203294.
- Dahl, Ulrika; kennedy-macfoy, madeleine (2020). "(Anti) Gender Studies and Populist movements in Europe". European Journal of Women's Studies. 27 (3): 282–284. doi:10.1177/1350506820929220. S2CID 219756407.
- Gallot, Fanny; Pasquier, Gaël (2018). "L'école à l'épreuve de la 'théorie du genre' : les effets d'une polémique: Introduction". Cahiers du Genre. 65 (2): 5–. doi:10.3917/cdge.065.0005.
- Graff, Agnieszka (2014). "Report from the gender trenches: War against 'genderism' in Poland". European Journal of Women's Studies. 21 (4): 431–435. doi:10.1177/1350506814546091. S2CID 147367936.
- Graff, Agnieszka (2016). "'Gender Ideology': Weak Concepts, Powerful Politics". Religion and Gender. 6 (2): 268–272. doi:10.18352/rg.10177.
- Harsin, Jayson (2018). "Post-Truth Populism: The French Anti-Gender Theory Movement and Cross-Cultural Similarities". Communication, Culture and Critique. 11 (1): 35–52. doi:10.1093/ccc/tcx017.
- Kováts, Eszter (2016). "The Emergence of Powerful Anti-Gender Movements in Europe and the Crisis of Liberal Democracy". In Köttig, Michaela; Bitzan, Renate; Petö, Andrea (eds.). Gender and Far Right Politics in Europe. Springer. pp. 175–189. ISBN 978-3-319-43533-6.
- Kováts, Eszter; Pető, Andrea (2017). "Anti-gender discourse in Hungary: A discourse without a movement?". In Kuhar, Roman; Paternotte, David (eds.). Anti-Gender Campaigns in Europe: Mobilizing against Equality. Rowman & Littlefield. pp. 117–132. ISBN 978-1-78660-001-1.
- Kováts, Eszter (2018). "Questioning Consensuses: Right-Wing Populism, Anti-Populism, and the Threat of 'Gender Ideology'". Sociological Research Online. 23 (2): 528–538. doi:10.1177/1360780418764735. S2CID 149904118.
- Kováts, Eszter; Põim, Maari, eds. (2015). Gender as Symbolic Glue. The Position and Role of Conservative and Far Right Parties in the Anti-gender Mobilisation in Europe (PDF). Foundation for European Progressive Studies and Friedrich Ebert Foundation.
- Kováts, Eszter (2020). "Post-Socialist Conditions and the Orbán Government's Gender Politics between 2010 and 2019 in Hungary". In Dietze, Gabriele; Roth, Julia (eds.). Right-Wing Populism and Gender: European Perspectives and Beyond. transcript Verlag. pp. 75–99. ISBN 978-3-8394-4980-6.
- Kuhar, Roman; Paternotte, David (2017). "Introduction". Anti-Gender Campaigns in Europe: Mobilizing against Equality. Rowman & Littlefield. ISBN 978-1-78660-001-1.
- Marchlewska, Marta; Cichocka, Aleksandra; Łozowski, Filip; Górska, Paulina; Winiewski, Mikołaj (2019). "In search of an imaginary enemy: Catholic collective narcissism and the endorsement of gender conspiracy beliefs" (PDF). The Journal of Social Psychology. 159 (6): 766–779. doi:10.1080/00224545.2019.1586637. PMID 30870100. S2CID 78092505.
- Mayer, Stefanie; Sauer, Birgit (2017). "'Gender ideology' in Austria: Coalitions around an empty signifier". In Kuhar, Roman; Paternotte, David (eds.). Anti-Gender Campaigns in Europe: Mobilizing against Equality. Rowman & Littlefield. ISBN 978-1-78660-001-1.
- Pető, Andrea (2021). "Feminist Stories from an Illiberal State: Revoking the License to Teach Gender Studies in Hungary at a University in Exile (CEU)" (PDF). Gender and Power in Eastern Europe. Societies and Political Orders in Transition. Springer International Publishing. pp. 35–44. doi:10.1007/978-3-030-53130-0_4. ISBN 978-3-030-53130-0. S2CID 228869405.
- Rawłuszko, Marta (2019). "And If the Opponents of Gender Ideology Are Right? Gender Politics, Europeanization, and the Democratic Deficit". Politics & Gender. 17 (2): 301–323. doi:10.1017/S1743923X19000576. S2CID 210541940.
- Sosa, Lorena (2021). "Beyond gender equality? Anti-gender campaigns and the erosion of human rights and democracy". Netherlands Quarterly of Human Rights. 39 (1): 3–10. doi:10.1177/0924051921996697. S2CID 232132773.
- Wawrowski, Łukasz (2017). "Czy jest sens dyskutować z przeciwnikami tzw. ideologii gender?" [Does it make sense to debate the opponents of the so-called gender ideology?] (PDF). Chorzowskie Studia Polityczne (in Polish) (14): 13–.
- Żuk, Piotr; Żuk, Paweł (2019). "'Murderers of the unborn' and 'sexual degenerates': analysis of the 'anti-gender' discourse of the Catholic Church and the nationalist right in Poland". Critical Discourse Studies. 17 (5): 566–588. doi:10.1080/17405904.2019.1676808. S2CID 210358322.
