= LGBTQ history in Belgium =

Lesbian, gay, bisexual, transgender, and queer (LGBTQ) history in Belgium has evolved since its creation in 1830. According to LGBTQ scholars Bart Eeckhout and David Paternotte, Belgium, which is considered a conservative nation, has developed into one of the world's most progressive and LGBTQ-friendly states. From the 16th century, Roman Catholic values influenced attitudes towards LGBTQ rights. Homosexuality was decriminalised in the 18th century, but sodomy remained punishable until the 19th century. Belgium developed into a more LGBTQ friendly state in the 21st century; Belgium's anti-discrimination law ensures that discrimination based on sexual orientation is illegal and introduced new transgender legal rights. In 2003, Belgium became the second country, after the Netherlands, to open civil union to same-sex couples, and granted same-sex couples the right to adopt in 2006. Belgium continues to provide asylum for individuals who may be persecuted for their sexual inclinations. The country has also implemented new education policies to combat school discrimination against LGBTQ people and has allowed IVF and artificial insemination to be available for same-sex couples.

Social and political changes from the 19th - 20th century, such as the rise of secularisation and the sexual revolution, contributed to the development of LGBTQ movements, gay liberation groups and uncensored media, all of which were important in influencing change and acceptance of the LGBTQ population. Additionally, the debate around the importance of marriage and the fluctuating nature of the political system, and the transfer of power from conservative Christian Democrats to the more progressive six-party coalition resulted in new changes to legislation. However, setbacks such as the AIDS epidemic and discrimination during LGBTQ events has furthered fear and sentiment against certain LGBTQ members of the community.

== 16th century ==
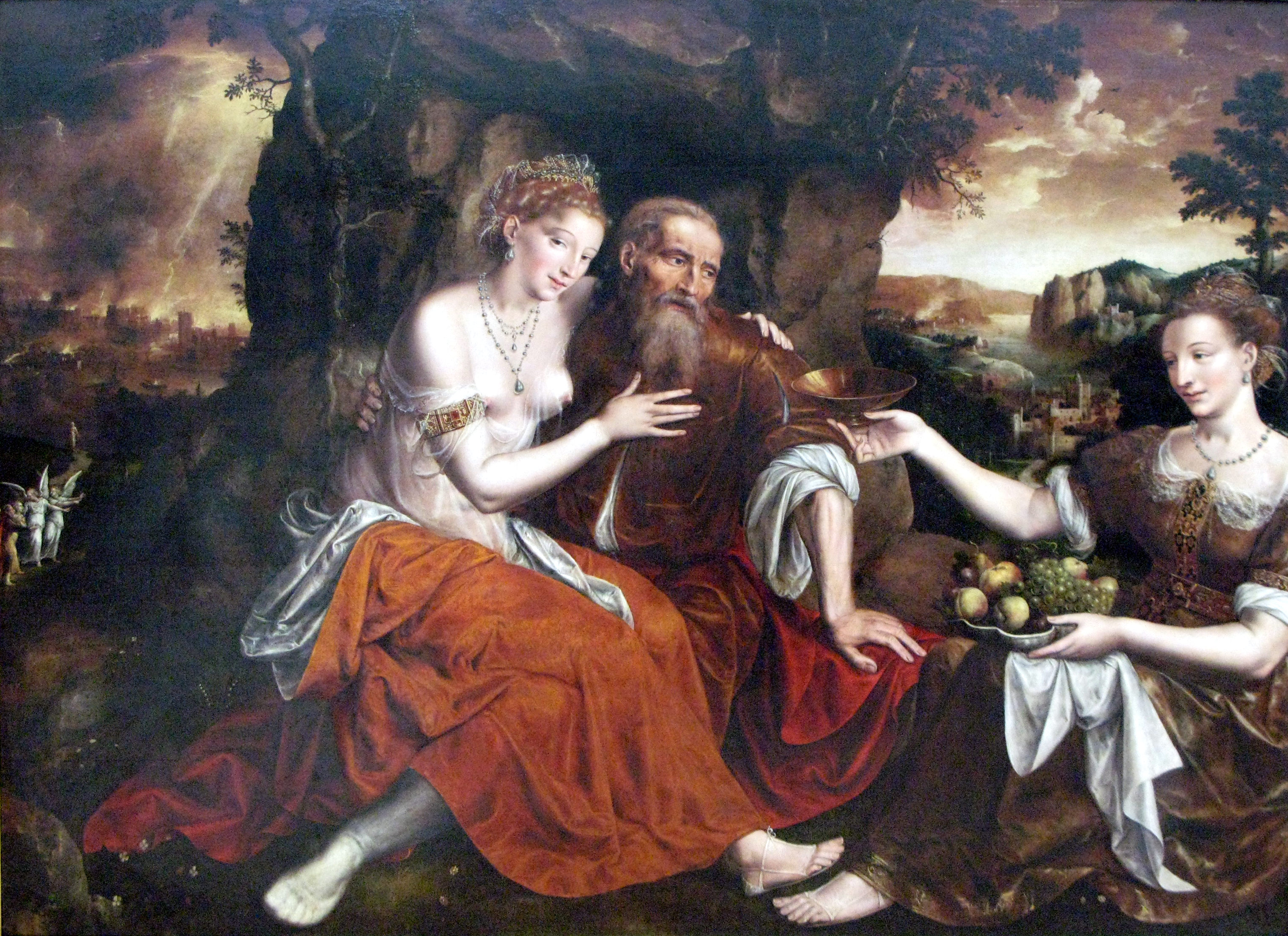
Jan Matsys, Lot and His Daughters, 1565.

From the 16th century, Roman Catholicism dominated Belgium. European Catholicism depended heavily on an individual's unwavering obedience to Catholic beliefs, resulting in Roman Catholicism having strong "historic ties'' and influence on Belgian leadership and surrounding powers. The dominance of Catholicism in the social and political landscape contributed to the societal views on homosexuality. Religion has been used to justify anti-gay sentiment.

=== 1500s ===
Sodomy of any kind, including same-sex sodomy, was heavily repressed in Belgium during the 1500s. Sodomy was considered an 'unnatural crime' and was punished with death by burning.

==== 1558 ====
On 26 January, two boys, 19-year-old François van Daele and the 14-year-old Willem de Clerck, were sent to the scaffold to be punished for their same sex relationship with a priest. Both boys were given heavy sentences including being flogged with rods until they bleed and having their hair burned off with a glowing hot iron. The boys were later banned from Flanders after their tortures.

==== 1565 ====
There were a high number of sodomy prosecutions in Belgium. Between 1400 and 1700, there were 204 trials for sodomy charges, involving 406 individuals, in Antwerp, Bruges, Brugse Vrije (the Franc of Bruges), Brussels, Ghent, Ypres, Louvain and Mechelen. 252 of those charged were put to the stake, more than half of the defendants who were accused of sodomy in Belgium were put to death.

==== 1578 ====
On June 28th, homosexual monks were purged via execution in Ghent.

== 17th century ==
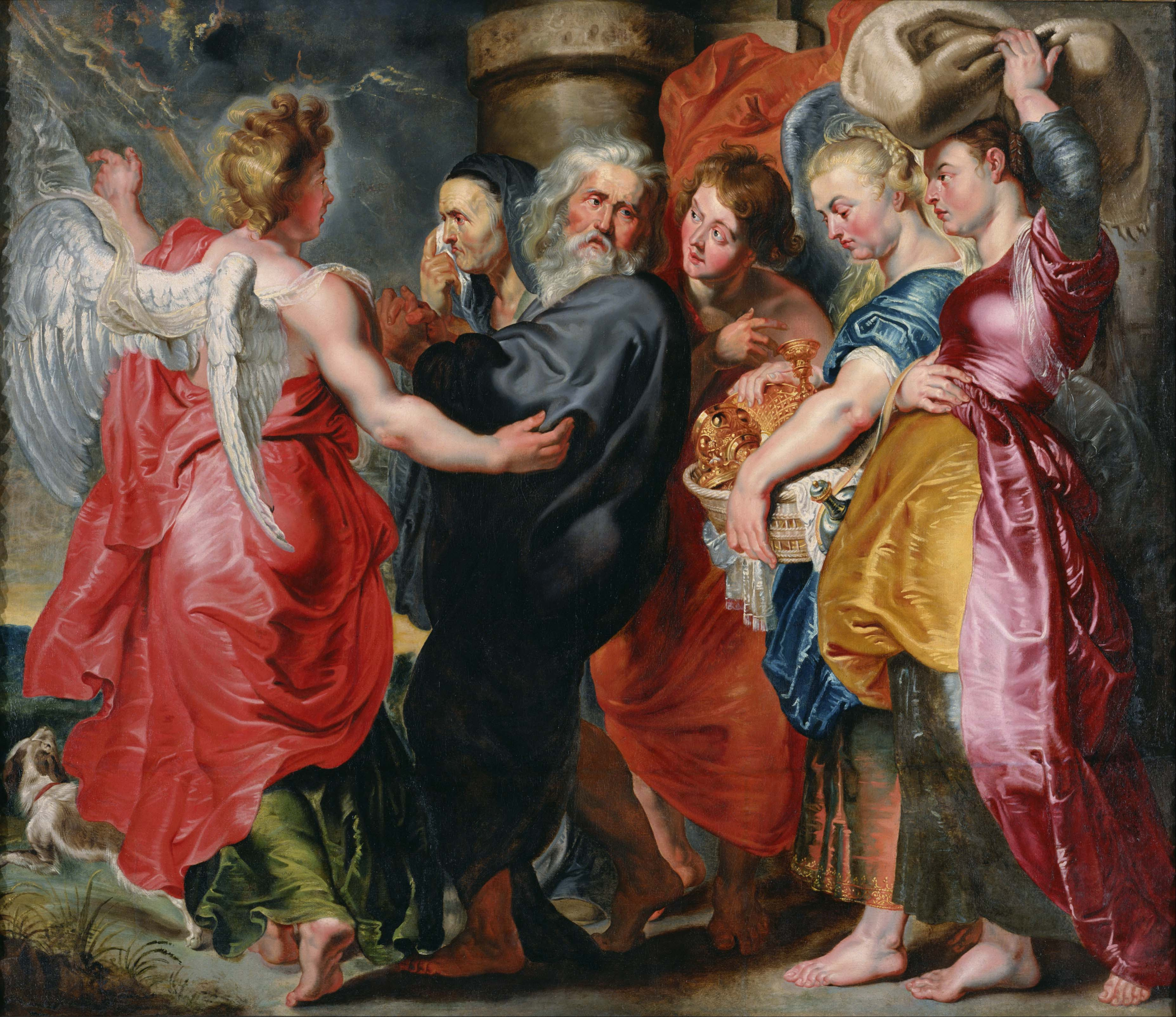
Lot and his family flee from Sodom, by Jacob Jordaens.

The criminalisation of homosexuality in Belgium fell under laws related to debauchery and public indecency.

Medical doctors tried to cure homosexuality. Gay men were sent to psychiatrists and treated with female hormones. Many gay men or 'patients' would lie saying they were 'cured' to get rid of their psychiatrists. When the treatment stopped, doctors and psychiatrists would describe the treatment as 'successful' in magazines and conferences. Treatments took time, were expensive and non-effective.

- 1620 -- Jacob Jordaens paints "The Flight of Lot and his family from Sodom."

== 18th century ==
Homosexuality in Belgium was decriminalised in 1795.

Same-sex sodomy was still considered an issue by this time. In 1776, Henricus Masso was interrogated in Antwerp by magistrates regarding an accusation of sodomy. They asked several valid legal questions including where he stayed, with whom he shared a bed with and what he and his companion had done together. Despite providing adequate information about his sexual encounters, Masso was asked further questions. These questions included, "What his partner had given or promised him for his sexual cooperation, whether other boys frequented the same house, whether his partner 'associated with any women,' and whether he himself had committed sodomy with others." The magistrates not only wanted Masso's confession, but wanted to record everything about this event and its context. The interrogation questions Masso was subjected to were commonly used in sodomy cases in Belgium during the 18th century.

Peter Stocker, in 1780, was also asked multiple detailed questions about his sexual encounters with two young men. The inquiry into Stocker revealed that he had sexual relations with many men, but the magistrates were primarily interested in why he had many relationships with men. Both Stocker and his partners were interrogated by the magistrates, who asked questions about the actual occurrence of sodomy. About Stocker's other partners, how Stocker had "seduced" his younger partners and whether Stocker had "moral awareness of the graveness of their actions." Whether Stocker understood that what he did was 'wrong.' The reason why magistrates asked such questions, some of which were not legally relevant as evidence, was to find ways to limit or eliminate the problem of sodomy.

After Stocker's case for example, the mayor of Antwerp wrote "they have declared that the crime of sodomy strictly speaking reigns in Antwerp, and that it is to be hoped that an exemplary punishment will be made to make the enormity of the crime known and to inspire more horror." Punishments for those convicted of sodomy did become stricter. Up to 1789, sex between men, under the official name 'sodomy,' had become a serious offence. Sodomy became associated, through religious teachings and law, with bestiality, masturbation, sinning and the apocalypse.

However, the true extremity of sodomy charges and punishments, and whether they were enforced equally in Belgium is debated. Despite the high-profile cases of Masso and Stocker, from the 1600s onwards sodomy trials became rare in Belgium. It was believed that if sodomy occurred, there was less inclination to prosecute those committing the act to avoid public scandal. Although in the 16th century sodomites were publicly executed as a form of public deterrence, most of the recorded sodomy court cases in the 1600s were dismissed based on lack of evidence.

During the 18th century, other same-sex acts also became minor concerns. The harsher punishments surrounding sodomy also seemed to have little effect on same-sex sexual behaviour. Many individuals continued to involve themselves in sodomy.

== Changing political and social landscape of Belgium ==
=== 19th century ===
In the 19th century sodomy ceased to be a crime and a legitimate legal concept. This was a legal improvement for those engaged in same-sex sexual activities. Different sexual relationships and practices continued, but motivations to engage in such events or why individuals chose to perform same-sex sexual activities were no longer recorded by legal institutions.

=== 20th century ===
Secularisation began to appear in Belgium in areas such as Francophone Belgium and some Flemish urban centres including Antwerp and Ghent. Secularism was adopted by Belgian freethinkers, socialist and liberalist politicians, who aimed to liberate Belgium from the influence of the Church. Dechristianisation was the product of the joint activism between the free-thinking movement and the working-class socialist movement in the Francophone south of Belgium.

==== 1940s ====
===== 1945 =====
Many university hospitals, like the Flemish and Francophone Free University of Brussels, ideologically aligned with secularisation. Hence, they enacted strong humanist policies, including surgery for transgender individuals and in-vitro fertilisation for lesbian couples, going against and systematically diminishing the social and moral power of Roman Catholicism in Belgium. The secularisation of institutions meant surgery and reproductive technologies are available and affordable for the LGBT community.

Secularisation saw the widespread resistance and de-idealisation of marriage as a social institution, with many heterosexual Belgians choosing to not get married. Hence, legislation had to reduce discrimination between married and unmarried couples; for example, reducing financial privileges for married individuals. As the importance of marriage diminished and the ideological and material differences between the married and unmarried reduced, Belgians were unlikely to disapprove of attempts to open civil marriage to the LGBT community.

==== 1950s ====
The Dutch Centre for Leisure and Culture (COC) influenced gay liberation Flemish movements in Flanders and Belgium's Dutch speaking north. Suzanne de Pues, a Belgian woman, experienced the COC and the International Committee for Sexual Equality (ICSE). And in 1953, she worked to found a gay liberation group in Belgium. de Pues established the association Centre Culturel Belge—Cultuurcentrum België (CCB; Culture Center Belgium), under her pseudonym Suzan Daniel.

In 1954, the first public activity of the CCB took place in Brussels, a second activity occurred in October 1954. At the second meeting a man humiliated Daniel by interrupting the event and stating he would not be taking 'orders' from a woman. Soon after, Daniel left the association and informed the ICSE that the CCB would be dissolved. Many issues arose leading to the termination of the CCB, the primary cause being disrespect from the male members and the conflicting views regarding the purpose of CCB; Daniel wanted to focus on the cultural and social importance of the association, potentially using it influence change in relation to LGBT laws and social acceptance of the community. Whilst many men saw the group as a place of meeting, relaxation and enjoyment.

In the 1950s, the LGBT community had to be as concealed as possible, not drawing too much attention to themselves. They had to "disappear" into the wider community and effeminate men and masculine women were not accepted in society.

Gay individuals were called "homophiles" or "homophily" which was considered a less offensive term because it referred to an individual who loved someone of the same sex, 'homosexuality' was a less used term because of its common association with sexual intercourse. In both the Netherlands and Belgium, the LGBT community received assistance from humanist organisations and sex-reform movements. The Flemish Humanist League was created in 1951.

===== The age of consent =====
In 1912 Belgium set their age of consent to 16 years, this unanimously applied to all Belgians regardless of sexuality. However, in the second half of the 1950s multiple authors wrote in Belgian legal magazines to raise the age of consent for same-sex relationships. The authors relied on so-called seduction theory; that older gay men in Belgium try to seduce and convert young individuals into becoming gay.

Belgian Parliament adopted seduction theory in 1965, and passed Article 372bis of the Criminal Code which raised the age of consent for gay and lesbian contacts to 18 years. Ultimately, discrimination against gay and lesbian individuals in the Criminal Code became a reality.

When Article 372bis was applied in practice, the older partner was given a suspended sentence and a fine. Whilst the younger partner was sent to the Juvenile Court that imposed consequences from a simple reprimand to a term in a youth institution. Threats about Article 372bis being used against certain individuals led to suicide and blackmail, hence the abolition of the article became one of the main issues of the gay liberation movements. Article 372bis was repealed in 1985, and 16 years became the age of consent for all.

==== 1960s ====
===== The rise of gay liberation groups =====
In Belgium, the sexual revolution of the 1960s challenged traditional understandings of sexuality and encouraged acceptance of and gave recognition to the diversity of sexual practices such as homosexual relationships. Feminist and Gay liberation groups drove these social and cultural advancements. The gradual acceptance and understanding of sex and sexuality began to shift values amongst Flemish Catholics. Ultimately attitudes towards ethical issues largely changed in Belgium. And Vatican dogma that shunned sexual behaviour, was discredited and disregarded, making way for LGBT acceptance. In 1969, sex became a more prominent issue in the universities if Ghent and Brussels.

The sexual revolution brought new activism and gay liberation groups. Including Amsterdam's Purple September and Brussels's Wild Hinds. They drew influence from radical feminist groups from both the US and France, and criticised the gay movement for being male-dominated and patriarchal. Although lesbian feminist groups were short lived, Purple September, in particular, exerted pressure on the COC to create an autonomous women's group.

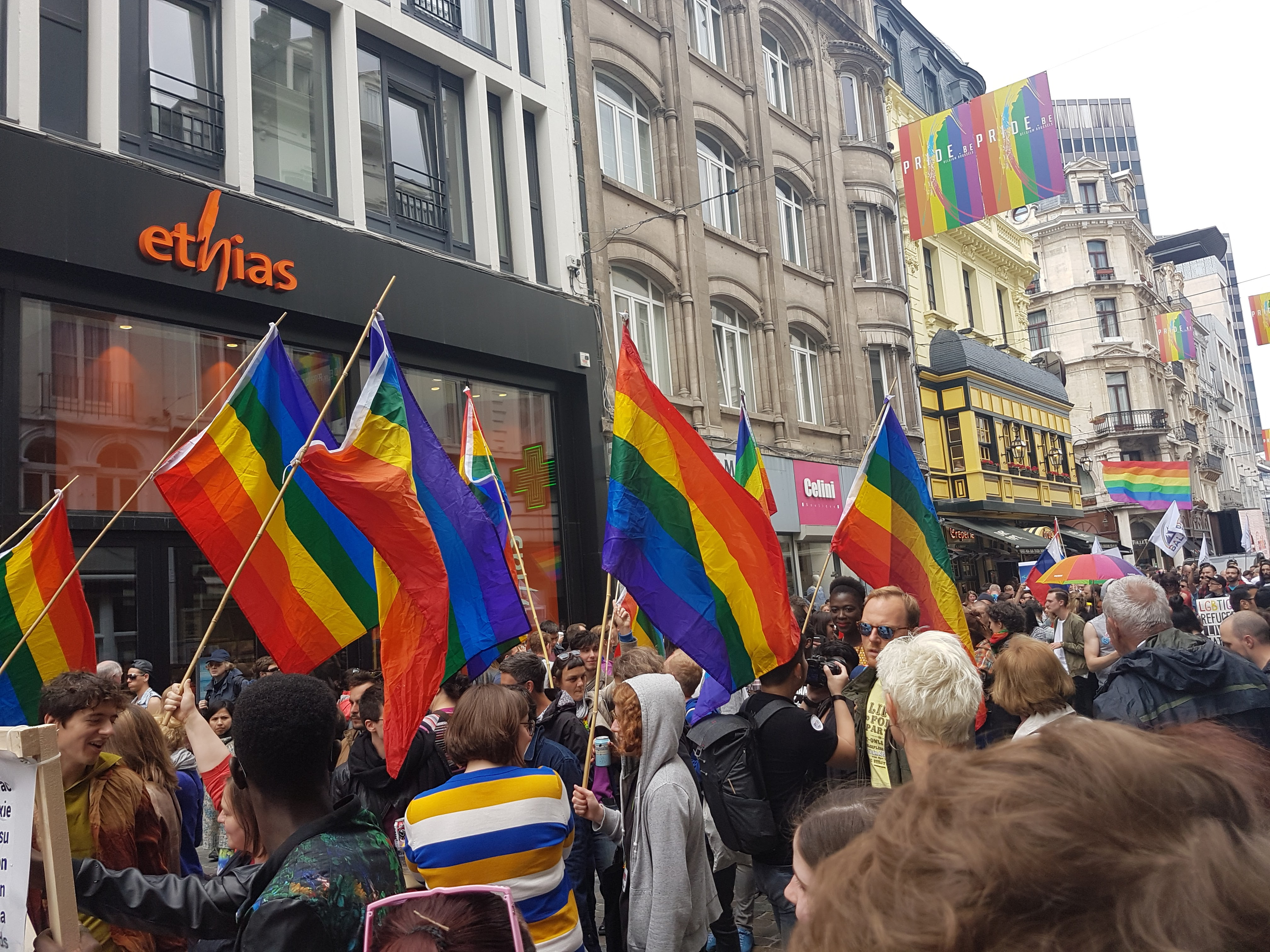
Brussels' 2017 Pride Day

The 1960s also saw several discussion and student groups appear in Flanders, distinctively Antwerp. Notably the appearance of a male, socialist, feminist and liberationist group the Red Butterflies (Roonie Vlinder) in 1976. The Red butterflies "took to the streets in small-scale, but sensationalist actions: the media eagerly reported on this shockingly colourful mixture of bearded bohemians and loud-mouthed queens calling for the overthrow of heterosexual patriarchy." In 1978, the Red Butterflies organised a provocative film festival that celebrated gender non-alignment, and gave the LGBT community unprecedented levels of public visibility. The Red Butterflies also influenced social and political discourse, protesting the public image of homosexuals as "a pathetic minority." On March 18, 1978, they organised a "Gay Day" which evolved into the annual gay pride, first held on 5 May 1979 in Antwerp. The Red Butterflies later dissolved in 1981 due to lack of interest amongst target audiences.

However, the 'Gay Day,' first started by the Red Butterflies later evolved into a Pink Saturday (Roze Zaterdagen). The first Pink Saturday was held in 1990, and it adopted the English name 'Belgian Lesbian and Gay Pride' in 1996 to emphasise the connection between similar events abroad and to help connote its purpose because of Belgium's multilingualism.

As the number of activist groups increased, cooperation became necessary. The minister of Dutch Culture and Flemish Affairs, the Christian Democrat Rika De Backer-Van Ocken encouraged the creation of an overarching organisation to represent the LGBT community; the Federatie Werkgroepen Homofilie (Federation of Working Groups for Homophily) later originated in 1977. From 1990 onwards, the Federation considered itself a political caucus, regularly discussing with politicians and influencing agenda and policy.

===== The rise of LGBT media in Belgium =====
Likewise, in the 1960s sexuality and sexual issues were less censored in media; radio, films and television. Almost all international LGBT-themed films and television have been shown on major Belgian networks, during prime time. And in 1966, 'Diagnosis of Being Different,' a program that interviewed LGBT individuals and discussed homosexuality openly for the first time was aired. Displaying LGBT images and discourse normalised their presence in society, allowing for greater acceptance and LGBT-favoured legislation. Flemish politicians introduced LGBT legislation, after the increase in LGBT representation in the media.

==== 1970s ====
The first gay venues in Brussels opened in 1970 in the Rainbow Quarter.

==== 1980s ====
The first major LGBT protest occurred in October 1981 in Wallonia, after a lesbian school teacher was sacked for publicly coming out.

==== 1990s ====
===== 1985-1990 =====
During the 1990s, individuals within the community-made complaints about discrimination; being bullied at work and newspapers refusing to promote LGBT-related advertisements. Flemish Socialist Member of Parliament (MP) Luc Van den Bossche submitted the first proposal for anti-discrimination law in 1985. This was resubmitted in 1988 and 1992 but never reached the Belgian political agenda due to disapproval from extreme-right parties and Christian Democrats. However, the Federation of Working Groups on Homosexuality (Homophily), continued to ask Senators to draw up new law proposals. After the 1999 Belgian elections and pressure from LGB movements, a new law proposal for an anti-discrimination act was resubmitted forming the basis of the 2003 anti-discrimination law.

====== The growth of LGBT media ======
Before 1989 the public service broadcasting channel VRT held a monopoly in Flemish media, and was the only provider of mainstream Flemish television fiction. However, in 1989 VTM was introduced as the first private channel. VTM changed the television landscape by introducing new genres such as soap operas (Familie), domestic sitcoms (Bompa) and police procedurals (Commissaris Roos). All of which attracted mass interest from Flemish audiences and challenged the dominance VRT. In 1995, VRT responded to the popularity of VTM's soap opera, Familie, by constructing their own soap Thuis. VRT attempted to imitate VTM's strategy of "airing a daily serial immediately after the news broadcast to keep viewers tuned in."

VRT had always highlighted societal changes through their broadcasting, in the 1970s, Flemish public television had to discuss ethical and sexual debates around the process of sexual emancipation. And in the 1980s, it had to address important themes such as "homosexuality, contraception, breast cancer and divorce."

"Christine Geraghty points out that the community soap opera model is a productive site to address sociocultural issues, because the genre occupies an almost fleeting position between the private and public sphere." This was evident when the first season of Thuis introduced the first (female) LGBT character on Flemish television: Elke Vervust. Elke grew from a secondary character into a more understood and important one by the end of the season, her character was able to mirror Flemish youth culture in the 1990s without conservative backlash.

Elke's storyline and development contributed further to the normalisation of the LGBT community in Belgian society. For example, Elke's sexuality is never stated in dialogue, yet her friends seem to know about her sexuality given their lack of astonishment when Elke introduces them to her girlfriend Jessica. Instead of emphasising Elke's difference as an LGBT woman by centralising a traditional and formal 'coming out' in the episode. This event normalises LGBT relationships by displaying a common scenario of an individual (Elke) introducing their friends to the person thy love.

The mainstreaming of gay and lesbian portrayals in VRT content also led private rival VTM to introduce a lesbian storyline into their soap Familie in 1998. VTM also revealed in 2005 that Jean Bellon in police show Zone Stad (City District) was in a relationship with a man. Competition between networks created more avenues for LGBT representation; when Thuis introduced a trans women into their series in 2016, younger commercial channel VIER also featured a trans woman role in their second season of show Gent West (Ghent West). VRT's adoption of LGBT characters and storylines played a role in the mainstream presence of sexual and gender diversity in domestic Belgian television.

As the normalisation of LGBT community continued, LGBT characters and storylines became common to fiction television in the Flanders. Out of the 156 "homemade" fiction productions broadcast in the Flanders between January 1, 2001, and December 31, 2016, 60 (38.46%) included LGBT roles and narratives. Non-heterosexual and non-cisgendered characters in lead roles also made up 36 (23.04%) of the productions. In the 21st century sexual and gender diversity has risen in Flemish television fiction, contributing to the normalisation of LGBT relationships in Belgium.

Yet, the representation of LGBT characters in Belgian media did receive criticisms. Thuis opted to write out Elke and Jessica in the second season. This suggests that lesbian representation was merely trivial, something that could be used for viewership and then later disregarded. Similarly, a study conducted using LGBT Belgian migrants found that gay films tend to disproportionately have unhappy endings compared to heterosexual films and television. And concerns were also raised about LGBT stereotypes, such as gay men being characterised as 'effeminate.' Their final critique was the lack of non-white and non-western representation. Belgian media centralised white, western men, with little acknowledgement of the differing sexual experiences of people of colour, who are influenced by cultures.

===== 1999 =====
====== Political changes influencing LGBT legislation ======
In 1999, for the first time in 40 years, the Christian-Democratic party lost the federal election after the surfacing of the Dioxin Scandal. Hence, it was a new six-party coalition of Flemish and French-speaking Liberals, Socialists, and Greens led by Guy Verhofstadt, that began influencing federal legislation, known as the rainbow coalition. Belgium is divided into three regions associated with separate religious or political beliefs; the Catholics, Liberals and Socialists. Liberal and socialist parties have historically been anti-Catholic and humanist, being able to develop a counter system to Catholic influence. Hence, the new coalition aimed to address "ethical issues," like the introduction of rights for the LGBT community, policies that the Christian Democrats refused to implement. The change in political power created opportunities for radical social innovation that would advance Belgium's legislation regarding sexual minorities/LGBT community.

== Achievements and developments ==
=== 21st century ===
==== 2000s ====
===== 2003 =====
In June 2000 a government-ordered study group reached an agreement that civil marriage should be opened to the LGBT community. However, in 2001 Louis Michel, deputy Prime Minister and Party Leader of the Francophone Liberals stated that the government was "wasting time" on minor issues like opening civil marriage. This outraged the LGB movement who in March 2001 lead a discussion with Michel, convincing him to withdraw his opposition to the opening of civil marriage a day later.

On 22 June 2001, a definitive decision to open civil marriage was made in government, on 28 November the Senate approved the proposal and the Chamber of Representatives voted for the opening on 30 January 2003; 91 votes for, 22 votes against and 4 abstentions. Therefore, from 16 June 2003, it was possible for the LGBT community to marry, and from 2003 to 2007 5224 same-sex marriages took place. Opening civil marriage to public authorities signalled to the general population that the LGBT community and their relationships were equal, and by 2006 the social acceptance of same-sex couples in the Flemish region increased from one in every three Flemings agreeing with same-sex marriage in 2003, to 64.4% agreeing with same-sex marriage in 2006.

Opening civil marriage to the LGBT community had certain consequences. In 2003 Belgium was set to hold an election, because of this the proposal for the same-sex marriage bill was pushed for a fast approval in the Senate and House of Representatives. Causing parentage to be disregarded; this means that a woman married to another woman is not automatically considered the child's parent. To become a legal parent, same-sex couples must go through an adoption procedure.

The Belgian Anti-Discrimination Act was passed on 25 February 2003. The Chamber of Representatives first passed the law on 17 October with 93 votes for, 13 against and 25 abstentions. The Senate later passed the law on 12 December 2002, with 40 votes for, 5 against and 14 abstentions. The Act prohibits discrimination and criminalises hate crimes and speech directed at sexual orientation. The November 27th 2000 EU directive encouraged all member states to establish a framework for equal treatment in employment and occupation. Hence, the Act also protects against discrimination in terms of self-employment, promotions in workplaces, dismissal and pay.

===== 2006 =====
In 2006 same-sex couples had the right to adopt, they can adopt both domestically and internationally. Domestic adoptions are regulated legislatively at community level which affects the amount of adoptions that occur in different regions of Belgium, for example the Dutch and French speaking communities. However, despite the new legal provisions, the number of same-sex adoptions are low. According to statistics provided by Statistics Belgium, only 48 adoptions occurred from 2006 to 2014. Out of the 48, 36 were domestic adoptions and 12 were international. International adoptions remain difficult due to certain countries not permitting same-sex couple adoption.

===== 2007 =====
The anti-discrimination law was amended and passed again on 10 May 2007. It prohibits discrimination on the basis of sexual preference, marital status, political orientation, language and health status; protecting the LGBT community from discrimination on the basis of having HIV/AIDS. The 2007 Act also allows transgender people to legally change their sex and name. Registering the sex of a child can be postponed up to three months under article 57 of the Civil Code if the sex is unclear and medical justification is provided.

However, the revisions still enforced irrevocable sterilisation on transgender men. This condition was overturned on 1 January 2018 with the establishment of the Gender Recognition Act. The Recognition Act was then disregarded in 2019 because of its binary conception of gender; a person is either male or female, which overlooked the rights of non-binary or gender-fluid persons. The Constitutional Court in 2019, agreed there needs to be a third option or no option to identify gender on birth certificates and ID cards.

Artificial insemination and IVF first became legally accessible for Lesbian couples and single women in 2007. The development of Belgian infertility treatments generated cross-border reproductive care; where patients who cannot obtain infertility treatments in their home country, travel across borders to receive the treatment in Belgium. In 2007 "2497 cycles of sperm donation were performed for French patients," anecdotal evidence highlights that lesbian female couples were the primary recipients of that treatment. News that donor insemination was available for lesbians in Belgium spread through the gay community in France through gay organisations and 'word-of-mouth.'

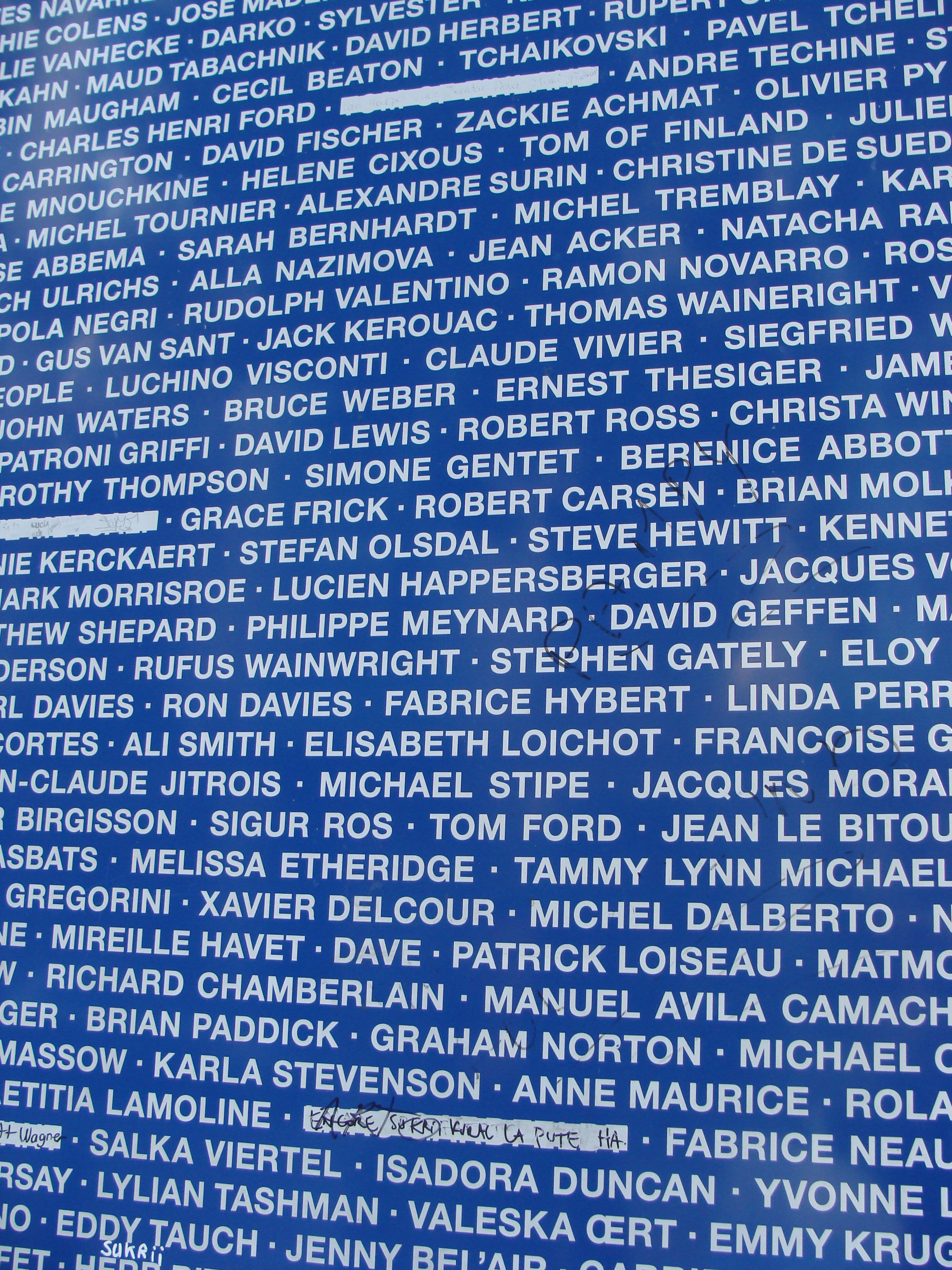
Designed by Jean-François Octave, 'Ma Mythologie Gay,' depicts the names of LGBT celebrities and members of the community. The names censored represent the names of individuals who have not 'come out' to the community.

In 2007, the use of art as a means of LGBT expression became common place, and was often displayed in public. Jean-François Octave designed an LGBT art installation called 'Ma Mythologie Gay' in Belgium. The design is a collection of the names of celebrities and the general public who are part of LGBT community. Some of the names are deliberately blacked-out to represent those who are still closeted.

==== 2010s ====
===== 2011 =====
Elio Di Rupo was the world's second openly gay person and first openly gay man to be head of government when he was appointed Prime Minister of Belgium from 6 December 2011 to 11 October 2014.

A 2011 EU Directive urged member states to accept asylum applications of individuals under threat of persecution based on their sexual orientation and gender identity (SOGI). The directive was adopted in 2013, but applications were accepted before then, the amount of which has been increasing from 188 in 2007 to 1059 in 2012. As of 2014 34% of SOGI applicants were granted asylum (289 of 840) and 39% in 2015 (236 of 609). However, this initiative has faced criticism. In a 2013 interview, Joel Le Déroff highlighted that granting asylum in Belgium relied on accessing the credibility of applications by asking for proof that the applicant is really gay. Sexual orientation can be hard to document, hence assessing credibility can be difficult and inaccurate, placing LGBT individuals in danger of being persecuted.

===== 2013 =====
In May 2013, on the International Day against Homophobia and Transphobia and Pride, 48 cities and towns in Flanders, 7 in Wallonia and Brussels raised the rainbow flag. An association of police officers known as Rainbow Cops was also introduced as part of an initiative with the Diversity Department of the National Police. Rainbow Cops Belgium are a "non-profit Association of police officers and members of the civilian staff of the Belgian Integrated Police," who aim to identify perpetrators of discrimination or hate crimes based on sexual orientation and gender identity. Raise awareness about LGBT issues in the community and within the police force; this was a means of encouraging mutual respect between the LGBT community and the police, and helping change institutional attitudes towards LGBT police officers. This correlates with the National Plan against Homophobia, which trains police officers and magistrates to acknowledge diversity during incidences and court cases.

In July 2013, the Parliament of the Fédération Wallonie Bruxelles established a decree containing mandatory activities that covered issues of "affective, relational and sexual life" that must be taught in secondary schools. In October, Pascal Smet, Minister for Education and Equal Opportunities in Flanders signed a charter that allowed for open discussion about homosexuality, gender identity and expression in schools, and ensured respect for all students regardless of sexual orientation.

===== 2018 =====
In 2018, Çavaria's Flemish school climate survey found that 41% of LGBT+ students felt unsafe because of their sexual orientation and 27% because of their gender expression. And that 50% of teachers in schools did not respond to homophobic or transphobic remarks made.

In 2018, the Diversity Barometer [of] Education, published by the Belgian Equality Body (Unia), analysed three education systems in the Flanders, Wallonia and German-speaking Belgium for possible exclusion. It found that staff understood the importance of LGBT topics, but did not know how to introduce them to the students. As a result, in late 2018, the Flemish parliament introduced a new school curriculum that aimed at educating the first grade of secondary schools about sexual orientation and gender identity.

In May 2018, Belgium launched its second "Action plan against LGBTI-phobic discrimination and violence" in cooperation between the Federal government and the Flemish, Brussels, Walloon, French-speaking, and German-speaking governments. The first plan, which expired in 2014, was criticised for lacking coordination mechanisms between the governments in Belgium and being biased against religious and ethnic minorities when overcoming hate crimes against the LGBT community. The new plan has 115 measures based on SOGIESC (Sexual Orientation, Gender Identity, Gender Expression, Sex Characteristics) that combats discrimination and violence.

On 3 January 2018, the Gender Recognition Act stated that no medical requirements or changes are required to legally change ones gender. For an adult to change their gender they need to file an application with a statement "that their legal gender does not correspond with their gender identity. No surgery or other medical or psychological treatment or opinion is required." For transgender minors who are age 16–17, however, they are still required to provide a certificate from a psychologist indicating that the minor is "sound of mind" and can "make their own decisions." This goes against article 12 of the Convention on the Rights of the Child, to respect the views of the child.

===== 2020 =====
Petra De Sutter was the first out transgender minister in Europe, in 2020 she was appointed Deputy Prime Minister of Belgium. De Sutter is a doctor and gynaecology professor. She campaigned for women's rights, gender equality, LGBT rights and sexual reproductive rights. De Sutter held multiple political positions; Belgian senate, parliamentary assembly of the Council of Europe or European Parliament.

== Setbacks and oppositions ==
=== 20th century ===
==== The AIDS epidemic ====
===== 1980s =====
The AIDS epidemic affected Belgium, it was considered irrelevant with little action taken against it by the Belgian Government. However, in the 1980s it became clear many gay men were HIV-positive and young men, particularly, were dying from the illness. Stigma and discrimination against the LGBT community was associated with the fear of AIDS. Some cities, ordered by the public, closed gay saunas and hospitals and dentists sent HIV-positive gay men away. In 1985 blood tests were able to detect HIV and AIDS inhibitors were available in 1987. That same year, the non-profit Horizon-Espoir ASBL was established to collect the coins tossed into the Jeanneke Pis fountain, which initially donated them to organisations researching treatments for HIV and AIDS.

=== 21st century ===
==== Issues with media and social activism ====
===== 2012 =====
In the fall of 2012 'Homme de la Rue,' a documentary filmed by two gay male journalists was released to the public. It depicted the two journalists walking through an Antwerp neighbourhood where ethnic minorities live. They used hidden cameras to showcase the homophobic remarks and harassment they experienced, presumably by Muslim youths in the street. This documentary's aim was to highlight homophobic intimidation in the streets, however, political debate following the release did not refrain from problematising the identities of the perpetrators. Instead of the documentary bringing attention to harassment, it created assumptions and prejudices that Muslim men, in particular, had issues with gender equality and public homosexuality.

==== The continuing issue of AIDS in Belgium ====
===== 2013 =====
The effects of AIDS are still prevalent within Belgium, which in 2013 recorded the highest rates of HIV positivity in the EU, "10.7 cases per 100,000," and infection increased by 20% in 2006 amongst gay men and over a 5-year period the number of diagnoses within the LGBT community has doubled. Gay and bisexual men are particularly susceptible to the myth that AIDS is another disease that can be managed using medication, and thus continued to engage in risky and unprotected sexual behaviour.

On 15 October 2013, Her Majesty Queen Mathilde of Belgium, Zsuzsanna Jakab, WHO Regional Director for Europe, Michel Sidibe, executive director of the Joint United Nations Programme on HIV/AIDS (UNAIDS), and Laurette Onkelinx, Federal Minister of Social Affairs and Health of Belgium together launched the Belgian HIV Plan, which would be active from 2014 - 2019. The Plan had three goals; "to reduce new cases of HIV infection while promoting the conditions for healthy and responsible sexuality. To encourage access to specialised HIV services and programmes for prevention, screening, care and quality support, within the framework of universal access to health care. And to reduce all forms of stigma and discrimination, particularly those based on health." HIV is less common amongst the Belgian population, with cases primarily present amongst LGBT individuals and migrants.

Programmes and services used to combat HIV in Belgium include antiretroviral therapy (ART). Early initiation of ART, administered during the course of the HIV infection reduced mortality. However, the positive effects of ART are not often seen amongst LGBT members as many HIV-infected individuals remain undiagnosed and/or are diagnosed later in the infection process. Men who have sex with men (MSM) in Belgium have an undiagnosed HIV rate of 55 per 10,000 people as of 2015.

==== Discrimination against the LGBT community ====
LGBT individuals face issues when building satisfying careers they are discriminated against in terms of promotions, they fear coming out to their colleagues due to negative reactions and abuse from managers, and overall have poor relationships with them. A study conducted by the university in the City of Brussels highlighted that 46% of the LGBT community do not go to work, and many also feel they cannot be open about their sexuality and gender identity in the workplace.

===== 2009 =====
A study conducted in 2009 found that violent homophobic acts are still visible within the community, with verbal aggression as the most common offence, "60% of LGBT respondents experienced this. 20% of respondents have been threatened, 10% have been physically attacked." Crimes are not reported because of a lack of trust in the police. Social exclusion and discrimination contribute to negative mental health outcomes including suicide; the suicide rate in Belgium is higher among LGBT people. According to the 2012 Eurobarometer, 50% of Belgians believe there is still discrimination against sexual orientation.

===== 2013 =====
In February, Bart De Wever, the mayor of Antwerp and chairman of the Flemish nationalist party imposed restrictions on LGBT city employees. De Wever argued that forms of self-expression conducted by city desk officers should be limited to protect the neutrality of the city and the public sphere. Limitations include not wearing any clothing that displays sexual orientation like a T-shirt with rainbow prints. De Wever stated, "I do not want anyone at the city desks wearing a Rainbow T-shirt. Because a homosexual demonstrates through such symbols that he or she is committed to that obedience." De Wever's comments imply that religious and sexual identity need to be kept private.

===== 2017 =====
In February 2017, Jamie De Blieck, the winner of Mister Gay Belgium was attacked in Roeselare a Flemish province in West Flanders. In the following April, a group of individuals followed and attacked a gay couple in Brussels.

===== 2018 =====
In August, a 21-year-old man was arrested after he posted a response to the Antwerp Police Department's tweet about Pride with an image of machine guns. At his home police found forbidden weapons and a swastika.

== See also ==
- LGBTQ rights in Belgium
- Human Rights in Belgium
- LGBTQ rights in Europe
- LGBTQ rights in the European Union
- Homophile movement
