= Roman Kuhar =

Slovenian sociologist

Professor Roman Kuhar
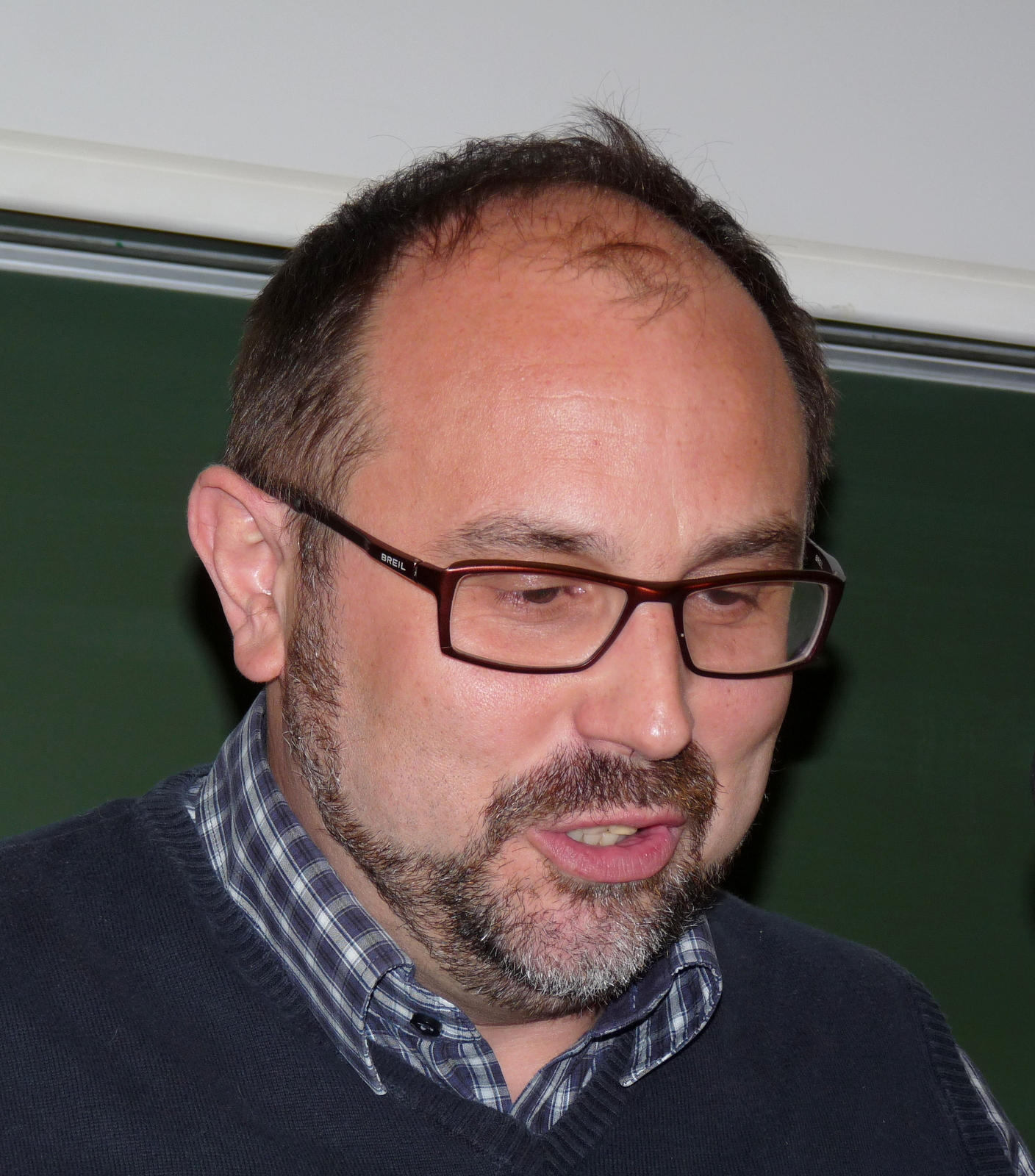
- Born: 1973
- Scientific career
- Institutions: University of Ljubljana

Roman Kuhar (born 1973) is a Slovenian sociologist and a Professor of Sociology at the University of Ljubljana. His research fields are gender equality, discrimination, homophobia, citizenship and human rights, and he is described as "one of the world's foremost experts on the anti-gender movement." His works include the widely cited book Anti-Gender Campaigns in Europe, co-authored with David Paternotte.

Kuhar worked as a journalist at Radio Slovenia before his academic career. He worked as a researcher at the Peace Institute from 2000 to 2009, and was co-editor of the Intolerance Monitoring Group Report. He earned a PhD in sociology in 2005 with the dissertation Intimate Citizenship: Private Choices, Public Policies and Everyday Life of Gays and Lesbians. He was later promoted to Professor of Sociology. He headed the research program "Problems of Autonomy and Identities in the Time of Globalization" until 2019. According to Google Scholar his work has been cited around 2,500 times.
