= Agustín Laje =

Argentine writer and political scientist (born 1989)

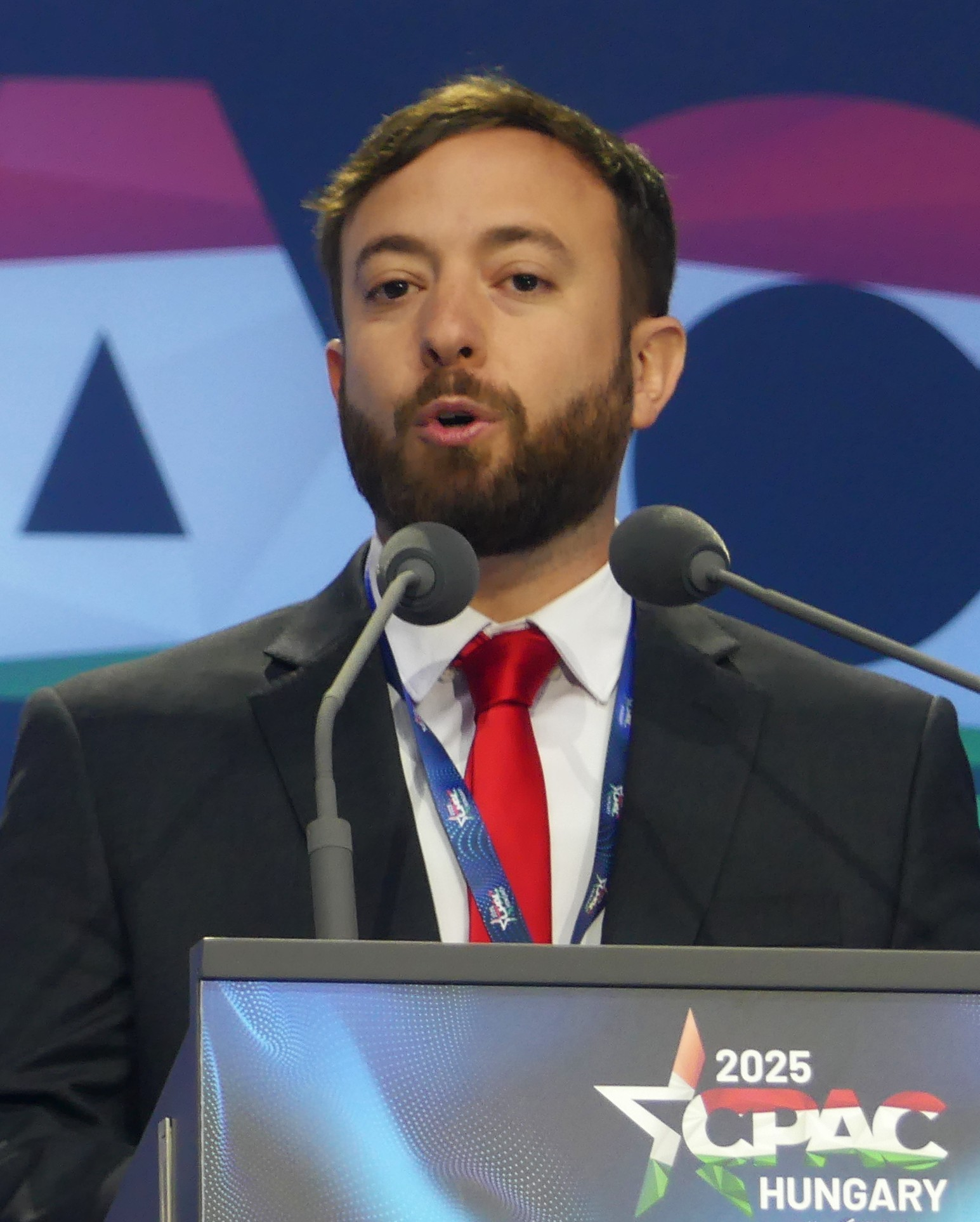
- Born: Agustín Laje Arrigoni; January 16, 1989 (age 37); Córdoba, Argentina
- Education: National University of Córdoba (BA); University of Navarra (MA); National Defense University
- Occupations: Writer; political scientist; lecturer

Agustín Laje Arrigoni (born 16 January 1989) is an Argentine conservative writer, political commentator, and lecturer. He is the founder and president of the conservative think-tank Fundación Libre.

== Early life and education ==
He began his systems engineering career at the Instituto Universitario Aeronáutico. While studying there, he published his first work, Los mitos setentistas: Mentiras fundamentales sobre la década del 70. This book allowed him to obtain a scholarship to study counterterrorism at the William J. Perry Center for Hemispheric Defense Studies at the National Defense University, in Washington, D. C., an institution of the United States Department of Defense. When he returned to Argentina in 2011, he abandoned his engineering career. He holds a Licentiate Degree on Politics Sciences from the National University of Córdoba, and a master's degree in Philosophy from University of Navarra, Spain.

== Career ==
In 2013, Laje published Cuando el relato es una farsa: la respuesta al relato kirchnerista with the writer Nicolás Márquez, where he criticizes Kirchnerism's position on the 1976–1983 dictatorship in Argentina. The book was rejected by local human rights organizations and organizations supporting trials for crimes against humanity, which repudiated it and managed to cancel its presentation in Bahía Blanca.

In 2016, also together with Márquez, they published El libro negro de la nueva izquierda: Ideología de género o subversión cultural. In it, they criticize third-wave feminism, and what they call "gender ideology", which are elements they consider to be tools of Cultural Marxism. This book generated a controversy in stating that a feminist supposedly supported the pedophile activist movement. Subsequently, the actress and host Malena Pichot interviewed Laje on a radio program, generating a debate which later went viral on social networks. Laje also participated in a debate with the presenter Patricia del Río, on the Peruvian radio station RPP.

In 2018, the book was presented at the 44th edition of the Buenos Aires Book Fair, where it provoked rejection from human rights organizations, social and political organizations. They responded with "songs and slogans referring to denialism, hatred, and discrimination that these authors promote".

== Political positions ==
Laje calls himself a paleolibertarian, minarchist, and anti-feminist. He is a strong opponent of abortion, making him a pro-life activist. He also opposes euthanasia. His ideas have been considered ultra-conservative and far-right by different media outlets. On numerous occasions, Laje has been called sexist, transphobic, and homophobic, but according to him, "he hates no one".

Laje defines gender ideology as a set of anti-scientific ideas that, for authoritarian political purposes, uproots its nature from human sexuality, and tends to explain it exclusively from culture.

== Publications ==
=== Books ===
- — (2011). Los mitos setentistas: mentiras fundamentales sobre la década del 70 [Seventies myths: Fundamental Lies About The 70s] (in Spanish). Edición de autor. ISBN 9789872664305.
- — (2013). Cuando el relato es una farsa: la respuesta al relato kirchnerista [When the Story Is a Farce: The Response to The Kirchnerist Story] (in Spanish). Ediciones Contra Cultural. ISBN 9789872982300.
- — (2016). El libro negro de la nueva izquierda: ideología de género o subversión cultural [The Black Book of the New Left: Gender Ideology or Cultural Subversion] (in Spanish). Grupo Unión. ISBN 9789873677533.
- — (2022). La batalla cultural: Reflexiones críticas para una Nueva Derecha [The Cultural Battle: Critical Reflections for a New Right] (in Spanish). HarperCollins. ISBN 978-1400235995.
- — (2023). Generación idiota: Una crítica al adolescentrismo [Idiot Generation: A Critique of Adolescentism] (in Spanish). HarperCollins. ISBN 978-1400238569.
- — (2025). Globalismo: Ingeniería social y control total en el siglo XXI [Globalism: Social Engineering and Total Control in the 21st Century] (in Spanish). HarperCollins. ISBN 978-1400331918.
