= David Paternotte =

Belgian sociologist

- Born: 1982 (age 42–43)
- Scientific career
- Institutions: Université libre de Bruxelles

David Paternotte (born 1982) is a Belgian sociologist and gender studies academic, who is associate professor of sociology at the Université libre de Bruxelles. He is known for his research on the anti-gender movement, and has collaborated with Roman Kuhar. Their works include the book Anti-Gender Campaigns in Europe (2017). He has also researched same-sex marriage and LGBT+ activism.

== Selected bibliography ==
- 2011: The Lesbian and Gay Movement and the State, Ashgate – with: Manon Tremblay and Carol Johnson
- 2014: LGBT Activism and the Making of Europe: A Rainbow Europe?, Palgrave – with: Phillip Ayoub
- 2015: Ashgate Research Companion to Lesbian and Gay Activism, Ashgate – with: Manon Tremblay
- 2017: Anti-gender campaigns in Europe: Mobilizing against equality, Rowman & Littlefield, 2017, with Roman Kuhar
