= Andrea Pető =

Hungarian historian (born 1964)

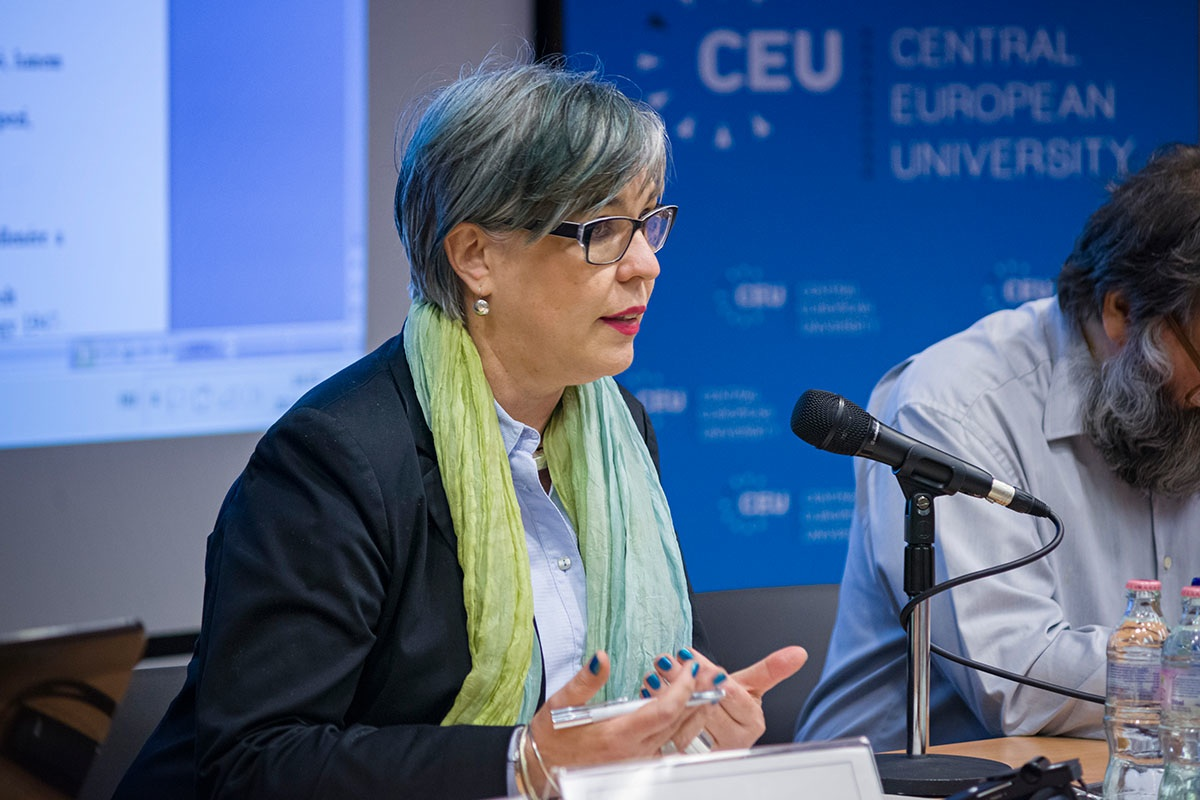
- Pető photographed by Dániel Végel in 2014
- Born: 1964 (age 61–62); Budapest, Hungarian People's Republic
- Education: Karl Marx University of Economic Sciences; Eötvös Loránd University
- Occupations: Historian, academic
- Years active: 1987–present
- Known for: Women's history, 20th century political history

Andrea Pető (born 1964) is an Austrian-Hungarian historian. She is a professor in the Department of Gender Studies at Central European University and a Doctor at Science of the Hungarian Academy of Sciences. She writes on political extremism and how it shapes the collective memory of society. Pető's work evaluates contemporary society from an inter-disciplinary and gendered perspective. She has analyzed the effects of Nazism and Stalinism on Hungary and Eastern Europe, as well as the participation of women in those movements. Pető has been recognized for her contributions with the Officer's Cross of the Hungarian Order of Merit, the Bolyai Prize of the Hungarian Academy of Sciences, and the Madame de Staël Prize of the All European Academies.

== Early life and education ==
Pető graduated with honors in 1987 from Eötvös Loránd University with a master's degree in history, culture, and civilization. She went on to study sociology graduating with honors in 1989 from the Karl Marx University of Economic Sciences, since 2004 known as the Corvinus University of Budapest. Between 1987 and 1991, she worked as a research fellow at the Hungarian Institute of Political History and in 1991 was hired as an academic coordinator for the history department at the Central European University. Pető obtained a PhD, summa cum laude, in contemporary history from Eötvös Loránd University in 1992 and repeated the distinction with a second PhD in 2000. Between 2001 and 2002, she was a Jean Monnet Fellow of the European Institute of Florence, Italy.

== Career ==
Between 2002 and 2008, she taught as an associate professor at the University of Miskolc and served as the director of the Gender Studies and Equal Opportunities Center at Miskolc University between 2004 and 2008. Simultaneously between 2003 and 2005, she was an assistant professor at the Central European University, teaching gender studies. In 2005 she habilitated at Eötvös Loránd University earning her degree in contemporary history. From 2005 to 2015, Pető was an associate professor at Central European University, and in the latter year was promoted to full professor. In 2014, she was awarded the title of doctor of science of the Hungarian Academy of Sciences. As a guest lecturer, she has taught courses in women's and oral history at the universities of Buenos Aires, Frankfurt, Novi Sad, Stockholm, and Toronto, among others and given lecture throughout Eastern Europe and the Middle East.

=== Research ===
Pető researches gender and has become a figure in gender studies for Central and Eastern Europe. She is particularly interested in examining political extremism and has analyzed both Nazi and Stalinist persecutions and their effects on society through the lens of gender. For example, her award-winning 2003 Napasszonyok és holdkisasszonyok (Sun Ladies and Moon Maidens) examined the paradox of politically conservative women. In traditional Hungarian society, politics was a man's domain, but by supporting conservative values, women were able to gain power within the masculine system. She built on the theme in the 2014 work, Political Justice in Budapest after World War II (originally published in 2012 in Hungarian), written with Ildikó Barna, which examined cases brought before the people's tribunal and their impact on post-war Jewish identity. Many of the cases tried challenge the collective memory of the period that the Jewish population used the courts to exact revenge for war atrocities. They found that a majority of the cases, which typically dealt with Nazi collaboration or theft of Jewish property, ended in acquittal. Examined evidence showed that the authorities adhered to a policy of avoiding even the term Jewish. Their analysis also showed that despite perceptions that the courts were dominated by men with a mob mentality, there was high participation by women both as accusers and accused. In addition, they found that women who supported traditional roles for society, typically received lighter sentences.

In her 2018 work, Elmondani az elmondhatatlant a nemi erőszak története Magyarországon a II. világháború alatt (Speaking of the Unspeakable: The Story of Sexual Violence in Hungary During World War II), Pető examines wartime sexual violence. Her analysis dismisses the easy answer of male aggression or punishment of otherness, noting that it was not simply invaders who raped and plundered Hungarian women during the war. Pető's evaluation confirmed that ethnicity was not a driving factor, but that the increased levels of rapes were driven by alcohol consumption, lax military discipline, and "the fact that the occupying Soviet army fell outside of Hungarian [legal] jurisdiction". She documented that women soldiers participated in the sexual violence and that their participation had largely been erased from the collective memory of the period largely because of the taboo of male rape. Continuing the theme of the invisibility in the historical narrative, her work The Women of the Arrow Cross Party: Invisible Hungarian Perpetrators in the Second World War explores how and why the perpetrators of the Massacre at 64 Csengery Street on 15 October 1944 became prominent or invisible. Pető argues that the manipulation of the memories of the event paved the way for the re-emergence of far right movements in the twenty-first century.

=== Activism ===
Pető visited Novi Sad, Serbia in 2003 to promote her book on the history of women's organizations which operated in Hungary between 1945 and 1951. While she was there, she witnessed a feminist walk which followed a map giving locations where important women lived, women's associations operated, and women's monuments stood, and decided to create a similar walk for Budapest. Research was required, as women's associations had been barred by the communist regime beginning in 1945 and few monuments to women exist in the city. Pető uses the tours to serve as both a teaching method and activism, recognizing that monuments and memory are a reflection of politics and power relationships. Her tours inspired students to make a similar map of lesbian spaces in 2017, using the records of the Labrisz Lesbian Association to locate important landmarks to the community. Pető has also voiced opposition to "right to be forgotten" policies in the European Union, when they have to do with global events, such as the Holocaust and war crimes.

Pető's work on political extremism has been challenging since the 2010 election of Viktor Orbán as Prime Minister of Hungary. His conservative stance has limited academic freedom, curtailed freedom of the press, eroded judicial independence and attempted to control public institutions and non-governmental organizations. Pető argues that by replacing diverse organizations that represented broad perspectives of different social sectors, the government created organizations which imposed specific identity requirements upon participants to receive funding. Following, they created research institutions peopled by those who ignored scientific protocols so that findings produced the narrative desired by the state, and eliminated independent publishing houses. The illiberal democracy which has emerged has been strongly criticized by Pető. She has written for newspapers and magazines about the curtailment of women's rights, including the attempts to roll back abortion services which were first legalized in Hungary in 1945 in response to war-time sexual violence.

Anti-immigration policies of the government led to rising xenophobia and caused backlash against immigrants and refugees in the country. As a response to government inaction, the Central European University staff and students collected funds and opened their doors to the refugees fleeing to Hungary from Serbia since 2015. In 2018, the Central European University was forcibly barred from operating in Budapest and relocated to Vienna. In 2021, in response to a plan to reduce qualifications for teacher training and a censorship request to remove comments critical of the European Association for Quality Assurance in Higher Education in an upcoming article, Pető resigned her position on the Hungarian Accreditation Committee, on which she had served since 2018.

== Awards and honors ==
Pető was awarded the Officer's Cross of the Hungarian Order of Merit in 2005, and the following year received the Bolyai Prize of the Hungarian Academy of Sciences. In 2018, she became the first Hungarian to be awarded the Madame de Staël Prize of the All European Academies. The prize recognized her extensive research on gender and contemporary European history including her work on the Holocaust, World War II, and political extremism. She was awarded an honorary doctorate from Södertörn University in Stockholm in 2021. and 2022 University of Oslo Human Rights Award.

== Selected works ==
Pető has written seven monographs, published over 250 articles and chapters of books, and edited thirty one literary volumes. Her works have been published in over 23 different languages, including Bulgarian, Croatian, English, French, Georgian, German, Hungarian, Italian, Russian, and Serbian. She serves on the editorial board two Hungarian academic journals as well as six international publications, and is an associate editor of the European Journal of Women's Studies.

- Pető, Andrea (2003). Women in Hungarian Politics, 1945–1951. Boulder, Colorado: East European Monographs. ISBN 978-0-88033-510-2.
- Pető, Andrea (2003). Napasszonyok és holdkisasszonyok: a mai magyar konzervatív női politizálás alaktana [Sun Ladies and Moon Maidens: The Morphology of Today's Hungarian Conservative Female Politicking] (in Hungarian). Budapest: Balassi Kiadó. ISBN 978-963-506-561-5.
- Pető, Andrea (2007). Geschlecht, Politik und Stalinismus in Ungarn: eine Biographie von Júlia Rajk [Gender, Politics and Stalinism in Hungary: A Biography of Júlia Rajk]. Studien zur Geschichte Ungarns (in Hungarian). Vol. 12. Herne, North Rhine-Westphalia: Gabriele Schäfer Verlag. ISBN 978-3-933337-43-6.
- Barna, Ildikó; Pető, Andrea (2014). Political Justice in Budapest after World War II. Budapest: Central European University Press. ISBN 978-963-386-052-6.
- Pető, Andrea; Hecht, Louise; Krasuska, Karolina (2015). Women and the Holocaust: New Perspectives and Challenges. Warsaw, Poland: Instytut Badań Literackich PAN. ISBN 978-83-64703-24-9.
- Altınay, Ayşe Gül; Pető, Andrea (2016). Gendered Wars, Gendered Memories: Feminist Conversations on War, Genocide and Political Violence (First ed.). London: Routledge. ISBN 978-1-4724-4285-7.
- Köttig, Michaela; Renate, Bitzan; Pető, Andrea (2017). Gender and Far Right Politics in Europe (First ed.). Cham, Switzerland: Springer International Publishing. ISBN 978-3-319-43533-6.
- Pető, Andrea, ed. (2017). Gender: War. Macmillan Interdisciplinary Handbooks. Farmington Hills, Michigan: Macmillan Reference USA. ISBN 978-0-02-866322-7.
- Pető, Andrea (2018). Elmondani az elmondhatatlant: a nemi erőszak története Magyarországon a II. világháború alatt [Speaking of the Unspeakable: The Story of Sexual Violence in Hungary During World War II] (in Hungarian). Budapest: Jaffa Kiadó. ISBN 978-963-475-083-3.
- Pető, Andrea (2020). The Women of the Arrow Cross Party: Invisible Hungarian Perpetrators in the Second World War. Cham, Switzerland: Palgrave Macmillan. ISBN 978-3-030-51224-8.
- Pető, Andrea (2021). The Forgotten Massacre: Budapest in 1944. Munich: De Gruyter. ISBN 978-3-11-068748-4.
