= Who's Afraid of Gender? =

2024 book by Judith Butler

- Cover of the US first edition
- Author: Judith Butler
- Language: English
- Genre: Non-fiction
- Publisher: Farrar, Straus and Giroux
- Publication date: March 19, 2024
- Publication place: United States
- Pages: 320
- ISBN: 978-0374608224
- OCLC: 1375546953

Who's Afraid of Gender? is a 2024 non-fiction book by Judith Butler discussing gender politics.

Butler was inspired to write this book after being attacked in 2017 in Brazil while speaking, at least one of whom shouted at Butler, saying "Take your ideology to hell!" Butler is interested in the literal demonization of gender by analyzing the historical context of the anti-gender movement. The title is a reference to the Edward Albee play Who's Afraid of Virginia Woolf?.

== Content ==
In this book, Butler explores the roots of current anti-trans rhetoric, which they define as a "phantasm" that aligns itself with emerging authoritarian movements. The book discusses the conservative movement against transgender rights, abortion, and feminism, which is coalesced under the "anti-gender movement". Butler covers examples from Pope Francis's comments comparing transgender people to nuclear weapons and Vladimir Putin calling Europe 'Gayropa' and saying gender is a Western construct that will destroy the family. Butler argues that the moment calls for solidarity between persecuted groups and a coalition of resistance.

== Reception ==
The book has been described as "the most accessible of their books so far, an intervention meant for a wide audience". Neel Kit of the Iowa State Daily said that it handles its subject matter "in a way that can be difficult for readers without a background in theory to follow", but also said that "[a]nyone trying to make sense of the latest round of 'gender panic,' from school curriculum bans to anti-trans legislation, will find Butler’s book clarifying."

In the review for The Economist, the book is said to be the most accessible of Butler's works, however the writing is "served up with a large portion of post-modern word salad".

Naomi Klein said the book is "a profoundly urgent intervention".
