= Tony Anatrella =

French Catholic priest

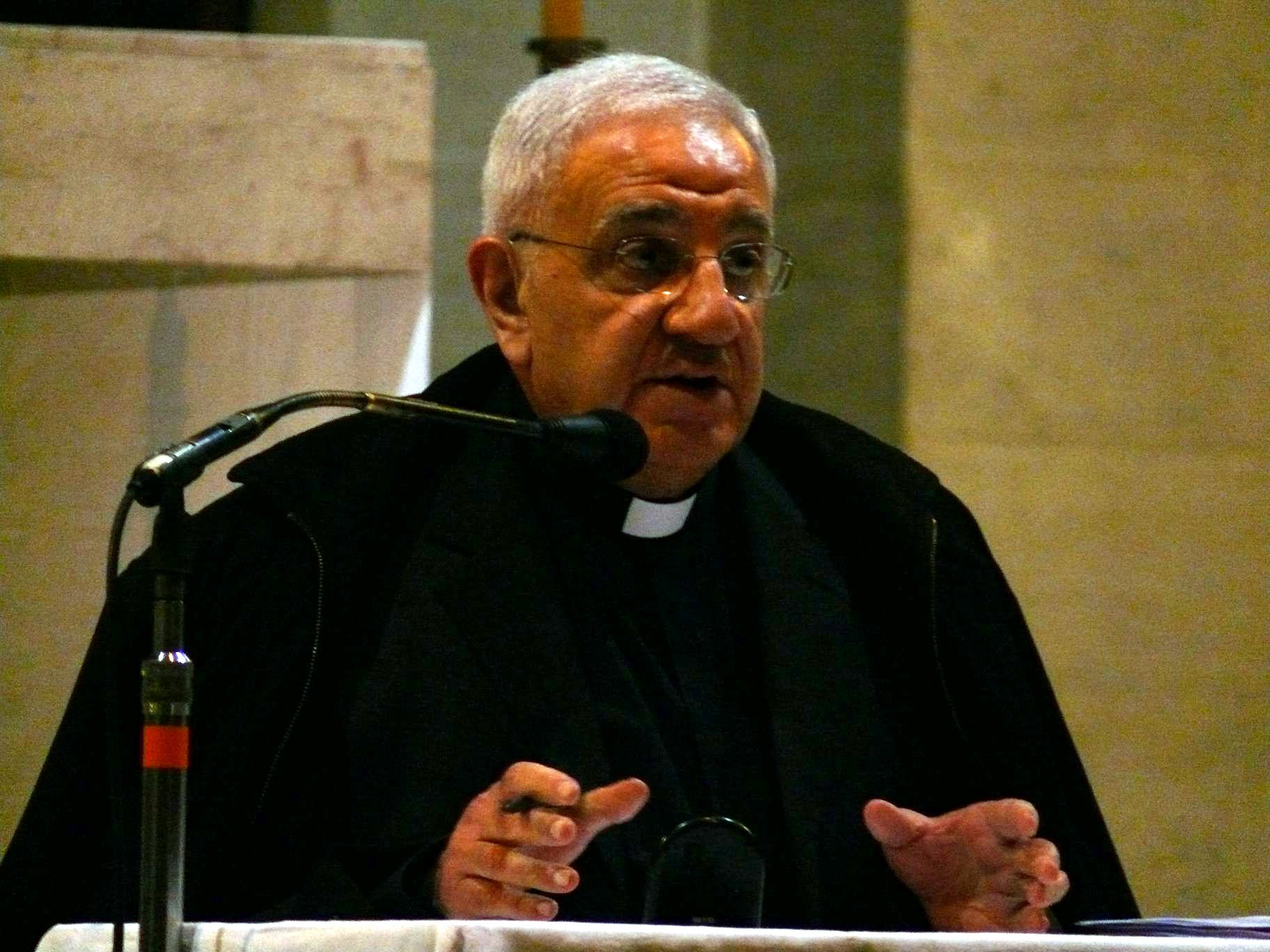
- Born: 1941 (age 84–85)
- Occupations: psychotherapist, priest

Tony Anatrella (born 1941) is a French psychonanalyst and a priest of the Catholic Church. He has specialized in the study of adolescent sexuality and homosexuality. He has opposed civil rights for homosexuals and the ordination of homosexuals to the Catholic priesthood. He held appointments as an advisor to departments of the Roman Curia and has been called the "psy de l'Église”, roughly translated as "Church shrink". After allegations of sexual misconduct from male patients he would receive for counseling, a canonical investigation was launched in the Archdiocese of Paris by Archbishop Michel Aupetit, leading to Anatrella being barred in mid 2018 from exercing any ministry as a priest in the Catholic Church.

== Biography ==
As of 1990, Anatrella taught clinical psychology at several training centers in France, conducted research at the social psychology laboratory of the École des Hautes Études, and was a member of the AIDS experts group of the French Health Education Committee. With the development of the sexual abuse crisis in the Catholic Church, he helped create the first guide for French bishop Lutter contre la pédophilie (Fighting pedophilia) in 2000.

In 2005 he was one of the advisors behind the Vatican's prohibition on the ordination of homosexuals to the priesthood. In an analysis of the Vatican action he wrote for L'Osservatore Romano, he also said that a homosexual cannot embody the "spousal tie" between God and the Church, nor embody a priest's "spiritual paternity". He listed the problematic characteristics of the homosexual: "Closing oneself off in a clan of persons of the same type; exaggerated affective choices; [becoming] a narcissistic position in front of a community that [the gay priest] disturbs even to the point of dividing it; a mode of vocational discernment that seeks candidates in his own image; relations with authority based on seduction and rejection;... an often limited vision of truth and a selective way of presenting the Gospel message; particularly in the areas of sexual and conjugal morality, these are habitually zones of relational and intellectual confusion and ideological combat, disapproved by a correct search for truth and the wisdom of God." In 2006 he told a conference on homosexuality at the Pontifical Lateran University that 40% of children raised by homosexuals become homosexuals. The Catholic News Service reported that the audience "chuckled" in response.

He was appointed a consultant to two bodies of the Roman Curia, the Pontifical Council for the Family and the Pontifical Council for the Pastoral Care of Health Care Workers. He participated as a "collaborator" in the Synod of Bishops on the Family in October 2014. A critic of the Synod's advice that homosexuals needed to be accompanied with respect, cited Anatrella's recent statement: "We must clear the field of many clichés: homosexuality ... has no genetic, biological or neurological origin. Its origin is principally psychological. Today a lot of false research and many experiments have failed to demonstrate its origin is hormonal".

== Views ==
In 2009 he warned that the Western ideology of "gender theory" was being imposed on African nations, that "to receive international aid — in the financial, health and educational realms — most African countries are subjected, through different associations, to the gender lecture". He has said that gender theory, the idea that gender identity is socially constructed, is "more damaging than Marxist ideology".

He views homosexuality as "an incomplete and immature formation of human sexuality".

In 2010 he was named a member of the commission of inquiry examining the apparitions of the Virgin Mary at Medjugorje.

In 2013, he opposed the legalization of same-sex marriage in France, which he said was promoted by "a lobby that reduces the family to what it isn't" supported by those "wishing to play Daddy and Mommy without having the appropriate characteristics". He said that "the confusion of sex and feelings leads to a confusion of the realities and an impasse. Marriage between persons of the same sex is simply ridiculous and the act doesn't inspire any esteem as it doesn't contribute at all to social relation."

In February 2016, after it was reported that Anatrella, in the course of a Vatican-sponsored training session for new bishops, had said they had no obligation to report instances of abuse to civil authorities, Cardinal Sean O'Malley, head of the Pontifical Commission for the Protection of Minors, insisted that the training session his Commission leads for new bishops rejects that view: "Our obligations under civil law must certainly be followed, but even beyond these civil requirements, we all have a moral and ethical responsibility to report suspected abuse to the civil authorities who are charged with protecting our society."

== Allegations of abuse ==
Accusations that Anatrella had abused patients in the course of therapy sessions were first raised by three of them in 2006, but their civil suit was dismissed for lack of evidence beyond that of accusers and the accused. Accusations were renewed in 2016, and this time church officials who had previously defended Anatrella issued a statement encouraging "any person who has been a victim of sexual aggression" to contact the archdiocese to report it: "They will be received and listened to, counseled on what to do next, and urged to file a complaint with the judicial authorities." Four former patients of Anatrella described therapy sessions that involved nudity and bodily contact. Investigative journalists found that Anatrella had used such methods since the 1970s and as late as 2011. The courses Anatrella taught at the Collège des Bernardins in Paris were suspended in 2016 and an invitation to speak at a conference organized by the Pontifical John Paul II Institute for Studies on Marriage and Family in February 2017 was withdrawn.

In October 2017, Aupetit initiated a canonical investigation of charges made against Anatrella. In a statement to Agence France Presse on 4 July 2018, the archdiocese announced that Anatrella was forbidden to exercise his priestly ministry, hear confessions, or provide spiritual direction. Aupetit also repeated an earlier prohibition first made by predecessor, Cardinal André Vingt-Trois, that Anatrella provide therapeutic services. The church sanction indicated that the investigation had determined that there was serious evidence of a crime. Éric de Moulins-Beaufort Auxiliary Bishop of Paris, conducted the investigation's interviews with patients who charged Anatrella had molested them in the course of therapy sessions designed to cure them of homosexuality, and reported his findings to Aupetit in mid-May. When these sanctions were announced in 2018, Anatrella had already ceased pastoral activity for several years but continued his work as a therapist.

In 2019, a 58-year-old man claimed that Anatrella had sexually abused him when he was fourteen years old.

=== Legal proceedings ===
On July 1, 2021, it was reported that Anatrella had been arrested and was awaiting trial in a canon court. The charges against him were not specified, and the trial date is unknown. On January 17, 2023, the Paris archdiocese announced that Anatrella had been barred from his ministry as a priest and instructed to live a life of prayer following a canonical process into the 2019 allegations.
