= Institute of Political History =

Hungarian left-wing think tank

The Institute of Political History (Hungarian: Politikatörténeti Intézet, PTI), the legal successor of the former Institute of Party History (Hungarian: Párttörténeti Intézet) is a left-wing public utility private research institute and think-tank located in Budapest, Hungary, outside the Hungarian governmental institute-system strongly associated with the left-wing MSZP party. It is aiming and organizing the multifold scientific research of the recent past and the present age. Besides history it is widening its focus on other social sciences as well. It helps the birth of new scientific results with tenders, scholarships, support of individual and team researches. It enables the public usage of the documents of national value kept in the archives and library of the institute. Besides the historical and societal research works, it hosts scientific conferences and cultural events as well. It is a kind of intellectual center that is concentrating first of all on renewing and popularizing social criticism in the widest range of the term. For the publication of the results of the researches the Foundation operates a detached publishing house, Napvilág Kiadó, and publishes the historical quarterly Múltunk (Our Past).

== The Archives of Political History and of Trade Unions ==
The precursor of the archives was established in 1948. It served as a department of the Institute of Labour Movement of the Hungarian Workers' Party until 1955, of the Institute of Party History of the Hungarian Socialist Workers' Party from 1957, of the Institute of Political History of the Hungarian Socialist Party between 1989 and 1998, and as a part of the non-profit organization of the Institute of Political History from 1998. Its maintainer is the Foundation of Political History. Before 1989, the archives had been collecting primarily the documents of the pre-1945 legal and illegal movements of the Hungarian labour movement, of the parties of the popular democratic period following the First World War, of the left-wing youth organizations, and of the people connected to these movements and organizations. Now it is storing the documents of the Hungarian Workers' Party and the Hungarian Socialist Workers' Party as well until 1992. Since 1998 it has been storing the documents of the Hungarian trade-unionist movement that were produced during the period of 1945 to 1989 and which had previously been stored in the Central Archives of Trade Unions. Nowadays the archives are focusing not merely on the political Left, but also on the entire Hungarian history of the modern age. It is endeavoring to trace, collect and preserve the private documentations that are enduring sources of contemporary history, with a special emphasis on the history of the change of regime, 1989. As open proprietary archive, it is handling the documents in its care in accordance with the Hungarian rules set forth for public archives. According to its own rules, the archives are open for research, while the staff is ready to provide the necessary information and supplies data as well. In the care of the archives there are 4298 running-metres of documents, and also 1215 cassettes and tapes, 30 discs and 284 rolls of research films. The majority of the fonds are co-ordinated and included in the inventory.

== Recent attacks against the PTI by the Hungarian government ==
The Hungarian right-wing government of FIDESZ-KDNP alliance with the assistance of the extreme right-neofascist opposition party Jobbik is attempting to confiscate both the majority of the materials of the archives and the headquarters building of the Institute of Political History, since it is the last independent historical workshop in Hungary; with its two-thirds majority in Parliament the government even changed the Hungarian Constitution to make its attacks against the institute legal.
