= European Journal of Women's Studies =

- Discipline: Women's studies
- Language: English
- Edited by: Kathy Davis, Gail Lewis

Publication details
- History: 1994–present
- Publisher: SAGE Publications
- Frequency: Quarterly
- Impact factor: 1.160 (2015)

Standard abbreviations
- ISO 4: Eur. J. Women's Stud.

Indexing
- CODEN: EJWSE5
- ISSN: 1350-5068
- LCCN: 94648660
- OCLC no.: 644465838

Links
- Journal homepage; Online access; Online archive

The European Journal of Women's Studies is a peer-reviewed academic journal that publishes papers in the field of women's studies. It is published quarterly by SAGE Publications. The journal's editors-in-chief are Kathy Davis (Utrecht University) and Gail Lewis (Open University). It publishes articles, reviews, conference reports, topical and polemical pieces, and overviews on the state of women's studies in various European countries. The journal has published special issues on subjects including women and war, gender and religion, and the politics of identification.

== Abstracting and indexing ==
The European Journal of Women's Studies is abstracted and indexed in Studies on Women & Gender Abstracts, British Humanities Index, International Bibliography of the Social Sciences, Scopus, and the Social Sciences Citation Index. According to the Journal Citation Reports, its 2015 impact factor is 1.160, ranking it 14th out of 40 journals in the category "Women's Studies".

== See also ==
- List of women's studies journals
