= Dragon Tattoo (film series) =

Film series

- Logo
- Based on: Characters created by Stieg Larsson
- Starring: Rooney Mara; Claire Foy; (various actors)
- Distributed by: Sony Pictures Releasing
- Release dates: 2011 (The Girl with the Dragon Tattoo); 2018 (The Girl in the Spider's Web)
- Countries: Sweden, United States, United Kingdom, Germany
- Language: English
- Budget: $133 million (Total 2 films)
- Box office: $266.8 million (Total 2 films)

The Dragon Tattoo film series consists of films based on the Millennium book series, which were written by Stieg Larsson and David Lagercrantz. The plot centers around Lisbeth Salander, an asocial computer hacker, and Mikael Blomkvist, an investigative journalist and publisher of a magazine called Millennium, as they investigate criminal injustices.

The Girl with the Dragon Tattoo, an adaption of the first novel in the series, was released in 2011. It was written by Steven Zaillian and directed by David Fincher, with Daniel Craig and Rooney Mara starring as Blomkvist and Salander. Along with Dragon Tattoo, Fincher and Zaillian signed a two-picture deal to adapt The Girl Who Played with Fire, and The Girl Who Kicked the Hornets' Nest.

The Girl in the Spider's Web, an adaption of the first novel in the second trilogy was released in 2018. The film was marketed as a relaunch of the franchise and featured a different cast, but was chronologically a sequel to Fincher's film. It is directed by Fede Álvarez, and stars Claire Foy as Salander and Sverrir Gudnason as Blomkvist.

== Films ==
=== The Girl with the Dragon Tattoo (2011) ===
A disgraced journalist, Mikael Blomkvist (Daniel Craig) investigates the disappearance of a wealthy patriarch's niece who has been missing for forty years. He is aided by the young computer hacker named Lisbeth Salander (Rooney Mara). As they work together in the investigation, Blomkvist and Salander uncover immense corruption beyond anything anyone could have anticipated.

=== The Girl in the Spider's Web (2018) ===
Lisbeth Salander (Claire Foy) and Mikael Blomkvist (Sverrir Gudnason) once again teamup, this time to become involved in a conspiracy of spies, cybercriminals, and corrupt government officials, and discover the deception runs closer than they understand, with familiar ties to the pair.

Film	U.S. release date	Directed by	Screenplay by	Produced by
The Girl with the Dragon Tattoo	December 21, 2011	David Fincher	Steven Zaillian	Scott Rudin, Ole Søndberg, Ceán Chaffin & Søren Stærmose
The Girl in the Spider's Web	November 9, 2018	Fede Álvarez	Jay Basu, Fede Álvarez & Steven Knight	Eli Bush, Amy Pascal, Scott Rudin, Ole Søndberg, Søren Stærmose & Elizabeth Cantillon

== Television ==
In May 2020, a standalone television series adapting a Lisbeth Salander story separate from the Millennium book series was announced as being in development. Andy Harries will serve as executive producer, while the show will be a joint-venture production between Sony Pictures Television, Amazon Studios, and Left Bank Pictures. By October 2023, Veena Sud joined the production as showrunner with Amazon MGM Studios also involved in its development.

== Development ==
=== The Girl with the Dragon Tattoo ===
The success of Stieg Larsson's novel created Hollywood interest in adapting the book, as became apparent in 2009, when Lynton and Pascal pursued the idea of developing an "American" version unrelated to the Swedish film adaptation released that year. By December, two major developments occurred for the project: Steven Zaillian became the screenwriter, while producer Scott Rudin finalized a partnership allocating full copyrights to Sony. Zaillian, who was unfamiliar with the novel, got a copy from Rudin. The screenwriter recalled, "They sent it to me and said, 'We want to do this. We will think of it as one thing for now. It's possible that it can be two and three, but let's concentrate on this one.'"

Fincher, who was requested with partner Cean Chaffin by Sony executives to read the novel, was astounded by the series' size and success. Fincher stated: "The ballistic, ripping-yarn thriller aspect of it is kind of a red herring in a weird way. It is the thing that throws Salander and Blomkvist together, but it is their relationship you keep coming back to. I was just wondering what 350 pages Zaillian would get rid of." Because Zaillian was already cultivating the screenplay, the director avoided interfering. Once the script was completed Fincher was comfortable that "they were headed in the same direction". The writing process lasted approximately six months, including three months reviewing the script, creating notes and analyzing the novel. Given the book's sizable length, Zaillian deleted elements to match Fincher's desired running time. Even so, Zaillan took significant departures from the book. Zaillian stated that during the writing process, the production team intended to stay close to the source material though there would be differences. The production team decided early in the development process that they would not stray away from the novel's darker themes, planning instead to delve deeper into them. Instead of the typical three-act structure, they chose a five-act structure, with Fincher comparing the plot to "a lot of TV cop dramas."

Yellow Bird and Metro-Goldwyn-Mayer partnered with Columbia Pictures to produce the film with Daniel Craig as Mikael Blomkvist and Rooney Mara as Lisbeth Salander.

=== The Girl in the Spider's Web ===
In November 2015, The Hollywood Reporter announced that Sony Pictures Entertainment was planning to develop a new film series based on the Millennium novels, starting with an adaptation of The Girl in the Spider's Web by David Lagercrantz. In the same announcement, it was confirmed that Rooney Mara and Daniel Craig, nor Fincher would return to the series. Steven Knight was announced in early negotiations to develop the adaptation, while the producers would be Scott Rudin, Amy Pascal, Elizabeth Cantillon, Berna Levin, Søren Stærmose, and Ole Sondberg.

By November 2016, Sony had entered negotiations with Fede Álvarez to direct the film, with Eli Bush slated to act as an additional producer. In March 2017, it was announced that the film would feature an entirely new cast as the director wanted to be able to create his own interpretation of the source material. Production set to begin in September 2017. In September 2017, Foy was officially cast in the starring role. By October, Sylvia Hoeks joined the cast as Camilla Salander. The rest of the cast was announced over the next five months.

Principal photography began in January 2018 in Berlin, and ended in April 2018, in Stockholm. The film is a quasi-reboot featuring a different cast, but still framed as a sequel to Fincher's film. It is directed by Fede Álvarez, and stars Claire Foy as Salander and Sverrir Gudnason as Blomkvist.

=== Canceled sequels ===
Along with The Girl with the Dragon Tattoo, Fincher and Zaillian signed a two-picture deal to adapt The Girl Who Played with Fire and The Girl Who Kicked the Hornets' Nest, which would possibly have been shot back to back. In January 2012, it was announced that Sony was "moving forward" with the adaptations of The Girl Who Played with Fire and The Girl Who Kicked the Hornet's Nest. Zaillian wrote the original screenplays, but Sony brought in Andrew Kevin Walker to revise them. The studio had hoped to have the same people involved in the sequels as in the first film, with Fincher directing and Daniel Craig and Rooney Mara starring, but due to delays, the projects fell through.

== Main cast and characters ==
List indicator

This section includes characters who will appear or have appeared in the franchise in main roles.

- An empty grey cell indicates the character was not in the film, or that the character's official presence has not yet been confirmed.

Character	The Girl with the Dragon Tattoo	The Girl in the Spider's Web
Principal cast
Lisbeth Salander	Rooney Mara	Claire Foy Beau Gadsdon^{Y}
Mikael Blomkvist	Daniel Craig	Sverrir Gudnason
Camilla Salander		Sylvia Hoeks Carlotta von Falkenhayn^{Y}
Erika Berger	Robin Wright	Vicky Krieps
Supporting cast
Plague	Tony Way	Cameron Britton
Nils Bjurman	Yorick van Wageningen	
Henrik Vanger	Christopher Plummer	
Martin Vanger	Stellan Skarsgård	
Harriet Vanger	Joely Richardson	
Cecilia Vanger	Geraldine James	
Harald Vanger	Per Myrberg Gustaf Hammarsten^{Y}	
Annika Giannini	Embeth Davidtz	
Frans Balder		Stephen Merchant
Alexander Zalachenko		Mikael Persbrandt

== Additional crew and production details ==
Film	Crew/Detail					
Film	Composer(s)	Cinematographer	Editor(s)	Production companies	Distributing company	Running time
The Girl with the Dragon Tattoo	Trent Reznor & Atticus Ross	Jeff Cronenweth	Kirk Baxter & Angus Wall	Metro-Goldwyn-Mayer, Scott Rudin Productions, Yellow Bird	Columbia Pictures	158 minutes
The Girl in the Spider's Web: A New Dragon Tattoo Story	Roque Baños	Pedro Luque	Tatiana S. Riegel	Columbia Pictures, Metro-Goldwyn-Mayer, Regency Enterprises, Scott Rudin Productions, Yellow Bird, The Cantillon Company, Pascal Pictures	Sony Pictures Releasing	115 minutes

== Reception ==
=== Box office and financial performance ===
Film	Box office gross			Box office ranking		Total video sales gross	Combined worldwide total	Budget	Ref.
Film	North America	Other territories	Worldwide	All time North America	All time worldwide	Total video sales gross	Combined worldwide total	Budget	Ref.
The Girl with the Dragon Tattoo	$102,515,793	$136,858,177	$239,373,970	#671	#618	$40,228,366	$279,602,336	$90,000,000	
The Girl in the Spider's Web	$13,292,139	$13,300,000	$26,592,139	#4,372	#3,461		TBA	$43,000,000	

=== Critical and public response ===
Film	Rotten Tomatoes	Metacritic	CinemaScore
The Girl with the Dragon Tattoo	86% (246 reviews)	71 (41 reviews)	A
The Girl in the Spider's Web	39% (233 reviews)	43 (38 reviews)	B
