= The Girl with the Dragon Tattoo (disambiguation) =

The Girl with the Dragon Tattoo is a 2005 crime novel by Stieg Larsson.

The Girl with the Dragon Tattoo may also refer to:

- The Girl with the Dragon Tattoo (2009 film), a Swedish-language film
- The Girl with the Dragon Tattoo (2011 film), an English-language film
  - The Girl with the Dragon Tattoo (soundtrack)
- Lisbeth Salander, the fictional character to whom the title refers

== See also ==
- Millennium (novel series), novel series featuring Lisbeth Salander by Larsson
  - Millennium (miniseries), 2010 Swedish television adaptation
  - Dragon Tattoo Stories (film series), American film series adaptation
