= The Girl Who Played with Fire (film) =

2009 film by Daniel Alfredson

- Swedish theatrical release poster
- Swedish: Flickan som lekte med elden
- Directed by: Daniel Alfredson
- Screenplay by: Jonas Frykberg
- Based on: The Girl Who Played with Fire by Stieg Larsson
- Produced by: Søren Stærmose
- Starring: Michael Nyqvist; Noomi Rapace; Annika Hallin; Per Oscarsson; Lena Endre; Peter Andersson; Jacob Ericksson; Sofia Ledarp; Yasmine Garbi; Johan Kylén; Tanja Lorentzon; Paolo Roberto
- Cinematography: Peter Mokrosinski
- Edited by: Mattias Morheden
- Music by: Jacob Groth
- Production companies: Yellow Bird; Nordisk Film; ZDF Enterprises; Sveriges Television; ZDF; Filmpool Stockholm-Mälardalen; Film i Väst; Spiltan Underhållning
- Distributed by: Nordisk Film (Sweden and Denmark); NFP (Germany)
- Release dates: 18 September 2009 (Sweden and Denmark); 4 February 2010 (Germany)
- Running time: 129 minutes
- Countries: Sweden; Denmark; Germany
- Language: Swedish
- Box office: $67.1 million

The Girl Who Played with Fire (Swedish: Flickan som lekte med elden) is a 2009 crime thriller film directed by Daniel Alfredson from a screenplay by Jonas Frykberg and produced by Søren Stærmose. It is the sequel to The Girl with the Dragon Tattoo from the same year and based on the 2006 novel by Swedish writer Stieg Larsson, the second entry in his Millennium series.

Starring Michael Nyqvist and Noomi Rapace in the main roles, the film follows Lisbeth Salander as she returns to Sweden after spending a year abroad. She falls under suspicion of having murdered a journalist and his girlfriend, as well as her own social services guardian, Nils Bjurman, while Mikael Blomkvist tries to find her before the authorities.

The third part of the trilogy, The Girl Who Kicked the Hornets' Nest (Luftslottet som sprängdes), was released two months later, on 27 November 2009.

== Plot ==
On returning to Sweden after nearly a year living abroad, Lisbeth Salander reconnects with her ex-girlfriend Miriam Wu and offers her free use of her old apartment. Later, Salander confronts her sexually abusive former guardian Nils Bjurman after hacking into his email and discovering that he has an appointment booked with a tattoo removal specialist. She warns him at gunpoint not to remove the tattoo that she etched on his abdomen exposing him as a rapist.

Mikael Blomkvist hires journalist Dag Svensson to work at his magazine, Millennium. Dag is writing an exposé on prostitution and human trafficking in Sweden, while his girlfriend, Mia Bergman, is writing her doctoral thesis on sex trafficking. Dag and Mia are about to go on a holiday and ask Blomkvist to come to his apartment and collect some photographs; he also asks Blomkvist to inquire about someone called "Zala" who may have a connection to his article.

At the apartment, Blomkvist finds the two murdered, and soon traces the handgun used to kill them to Bjurman, who has also been murdered. Salander is the prime suspect because her fingerprints are on the gun. After initially resisting his help, Salander tells Blomkvist that she did not kill anyone and that they need to find the mysterious "Zala".

Salander's boxing trainer and friend, Paolo Roberto, contacts Blomkvist and says that he can find her by reaching out to Miriam. Near her apartment, Paolo witnesses Miriam being kidnapped by Ronald Niedermann, a career criminal with ties to a human trafficking ring. Paolo follows Niedermann to a deserted barn, where he hears him torturing Miriam for information about Salander. Paolo tries to rescue her, but Niedermann beats him up and sets the barn aflame, although Paolo and Miriam manage to escape.

News breaks of the attack, and Paolo gives his account to the police. After Blomkvist leaves information that he has discovered about the case on his computer for Salander to hack into and read, she leaves a message to him saying, "Thank you for being my friend." He realizes that she intends to set out alone to find the man who framed her and that she may not survive.

A disguised Salander visits Miriam in hospital to apologize for getting her involved. Salander confirms the police sketch of Niedermann with Miriam and then disappears. Miriam calls Blomkvist and gives him keys that Salander dropped during her visit. Noticing that one of them is for a post office box, Blomkvist is able to access and read Salander's mail and locate her apartment. Meanwhile, Salander stakes out Niedermann's post office box, eventually seeing someone retrieve his mail and following him to a small house near Gosseberga. Reading the material in Salander's apartment, Blomkvist finds a video of Bjurman raping her.

Paolo meets with Blomkvist and explains that he tracked down Niedermann and learned that he has congenital analgesia, which makes him unable to feel pain. They trace Niedermann to a company owned by "Karl Axel Bodin." Blomkvist has his Millennium colleague and lover Erika Berger forward documents to Bublanski and sets out to find Salander.

Salander enters the Gosseberga house, but Niedermann has been alerted by motion detectors and knocks her out. She awakens to see her father, Alexander "Zala" Zalachenko, whom she has not seen since she set him on fire and disfigured him as a child. Zalachenko dismisses her mother as a whore and belittles her rape at the hands of Bjurman. He reveals that Niedermann is her half-brother and that Niedermann killed Bjurman to prevent him from revealing Zalachenko's secrets.

They lead Salander to a shallow grave in the woods. She tells him that the police will find him soon and all that he has said has been published online through her hidden cellphone. Seeing through her bluff, he shoots Salander several times as she attempts to escape and buries her alive. Salander digs her way out and buries an axe in Zalachenko's leg. She keeps Niedermann at bay with Zalachenko's gun as Blomkvist comes coasting up the driveway. An ambulance arrives to take away Salander and Zalachenko, who are both seriously injured.

== Cast ==
- Michael Nyqvist as Mikael Blomkvist
- Noomi Rapace as Lisbeth Salander
- Lena Endre as Erika Berger
- Peter Andersson as Nils Erik Bjurman
- Per Oscarsson as Holger Palmgren
- Georgi Staykov as Alexander Zalachenko
- Sofia Ledarp as Malin Eriksson
- Yasmine Garbi as Miriam Wu
- Annika Hallin as Annika Giannini
- Tanja Lorentzon as Sonja Modig
- Paolo Roberto as himself
- Johan Kylén as Jan Bublanski
- Magnus Krepper as Hans Faste
- Ralph Carlsson as Gunnar Björck
- Micke Spreitz as Ronald Niedermann
- Anders Ahlbom as Dr. Peter Teleborian
- Tehilla Blad as young Lisbeth Salander

== Production ==
Daniel Alfredson takes over from Niels Arden Oplev, who directed The Girl with the Dragon Tattoo, the first part of the trilogy.

== Reception ==
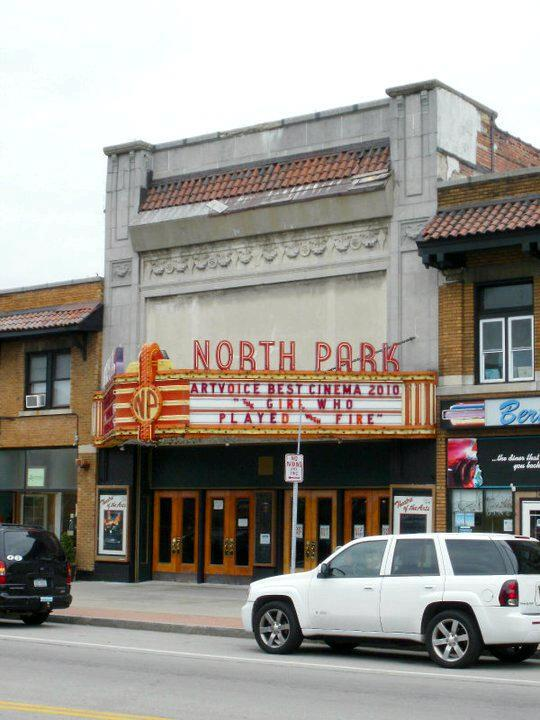
Film showing at theater in Buffalo, New York

=== Critical response ===
The film received mostly positive reviews from critics, although some noted it as a step down from its predecessor. On review aggregation website Rotten Tomatoes, the film holds an approval rating of 69% based on 156 reviews with an average rating of 6.2/10. Metacritic, which uses a weighted average, assigned the film a score of 66 out of 100, based on 35 critics, indicating "generally favorable" reviews.

Roger Ebert of the Chicago Sun-Times gives the film three and a half out of four stars, describing the film as a step down from The Girl With the Dragon Tattoo, but only because the first film was so "fresh and unexpected". A. O. Scott of The New York Times praises Rapace's performance, stating, "tiny and agile, her steely rage showing now and then the tiniest crack of vulnerability, belongs to another dimension altogether. She makes this movie good enough, but also makes you wish it were much better." Lisa Kennedy of The Denver Post describes Lisbeth Salander as "worth the trouble" and having a "cold stare" the like of which has not been seen since "Clint was roaming the Italian hillsides." She notes the film uses the linked themes of bureaucratic corruption and misogyny, where the previous film linked misogyny with fascism. The review contrasts the violence against women and heroism of Fire with the violence of The Killer Inside Me, complaining that the latter gives in to the worst impulses, noting that only the former story "works,” as some redemption is provided through revenge.

Michael Phillips of the Chicago Tribune writes that the film is much the same as its predecessor, despite the new director (Daniel Alfredson) and screenwriter (Jonas Frykberg), and is likely to please those who enjoyed the first film. He observes that Rapace remains the chief asset of the series, and that she works well with Michael Nyqvist, whom he likens to a more sincere, Swedish version of Larry Hagman. He writes further that even though Rapace and Nyqvist "could not be better" in their roles, the film should acknowledge the middle ground between the righteous heroes and the evil villains in order to work better as cinematic pulp fiction.

Peter Travers of Rolling Stone gives the film 3 out of 4 stars.

Rick Groen of The Globe and Mail describes the film as "Tepid and downright confusing" for those who have not read the books, although he suspects there are few who have not; he notes that the plot, "already thick on the page, often seems impenetrable here." Although he concedes the plot generates some suspense, he complains it more often results in confusion but hopes the final film in the trilogy will bring greater clarity.

=== Box office ===
Prior to its release in the United States, the film had already earned $51,259,526 at the international box office.

During its first week of release in the United States, it grossed $904,998, being released in three times as many theaters as the first film and grossing three times as much. The film has a worldwide gross of $67,126,795.
