= Tanja Lorentzon =

Sweden-Finnish actress

- Born: Tanja Mirjam Cecilia Koukonen; 25 September 1971 (age 54); Botkyrka, Sweden
- Education: Bachelor's degree
- Alma mater: Swedish National Academy of Mime and Acting
- Occupations: Actress, dramatist, playwright, screenwriter
- Years active: 1997–present

Tanja Mirjam Cecilia Lorentzon (née Tanja Mirjam Cecilia Koukonen; born 25 September 1971), previously known as Tanja Svedjeström, is a Sweden-Finnish actress and dramatist of Finnish descent. Internationally, she is probably best known for her role of Sonja Modig in The Girl Who Played with Fire and The Girl Who Kicked the Hornets' Nest, film adaptations of the Millennium series by Stieg Larsson.

== Early and personal life ==
Lorentzon was born in Tumba, Stockholm County, Sweden, to Finnish parents. In her youth, Lorentzon worked as an engineer in the Ericsson, Inc., a cleaner and a teacher before entering the Swedish National Academy of Mime and Acting in 1994. She earned her bachelor's degree in 1998.

Lorentzon currently lives in Stockholm with her husband and their three daughters.

== Writing career ==
In 2010, Lorentzon debuted as a screenwriter with her monologue play Grandmother's Dark Eyes (Swedish: Mormors mörka ögon), in which she played all three characters — herself, her mother and her grandmother. The plays follows lives of . In December 2010, Grandmother's Dark Eyes was broadcast on the STV. The following year, Lorentzon was awarded with the P7 Sisuradio Award for Swedish Finn of the Year for her work on Grandmother's Dark Eyes.

== Filmography ==
Title	Original Title	Year	Role	Notes
Before the Day	Inna dagen	1997	Ana	Short film
Alone at Home	Ensamma hemma	1998	Tanja	Short film
Eva & Adam	Eva & Adam	1999	Interviewer	TV series; 1 episode
Crime Wave	Brottsvåg	2000	Alexandra Melin Fuchs	TV series; 24 episodes
Away / Near	Borta / Nära	2001	Sad Woman	Short film
Sidetracked	Villospår	2001	Elisabet Carlén	TV film
Outside Your Door	Utanför din dörr	2002	Angelica Stjernholm	
Neighbourhood Watch	Grannsamverkan	2004		Short film
Four Shades of Brown	Fyra nyanser av brunt	2004	Olle's wife	
My Ex-Family	Min f.d. familj	2004	Louise	TV series; 2 episodes
Daddy's Little Fatty	Pappas lilla tjockis	2005	Olle's wife	TV film
Lovisa and Carl Michael	Lovisa och Carl Michael	2005	Lovisa Bellman	TV film
Darling	Darling	2007	Maja	
Brother and Sister	Bror och syster	2007	Yvonne	TV series
Maria Wern	Maria Wern	2008	Erika	Miniseries; 8 episodes
Wallander	Wallander	2009	Helena Landberg	TV series; 1 episode
Summer With Göran — A Midsummer Night Comedy	Sommaren med Göran – En midsommarnattskomedi	2009	Anne	
The Girl Who Played with Fire	Flickan som lekte med elden	2009	Sonja Modig	
The Girl Who Kicked the Hornets' Nest	Luftslottet som sprängdes	2009	Sonja Modig	
Millennium	Millennium	2010	Sonja Modig	Miniseries; 4 episodes
Maria Wern — Dreams from Snow	Maria Wern — Drömmar ur snö	2011	Erika	Direct-to-video
The Chinese Man	Kinesen	2011	Journalist	TV film
Maria Wern — May the Death Sleep	Maria Wern — Må döden sova	2011	Erika	Direct-to-video
Maria Wern — Black Butterfly	Maria Wern — Svart fjäril	2011	Erika	Direct-to-video
Maria Wern — Boy Missing	Maria Wern — Pojke försvunnen	2011	Erika	Direct-to-video
Cockpit	Cockpit	2012	nyskild magspecialist	

== Writing ==
Title	Original Title	Year	Credits	Production	Notes
Grandmother's Dark Eyes	Mormors mörka ögon	2010	Actress, writer	Royal Dramatic Theatre	Stage play

== Awards and nominations ==
Awards	Year	Category	Work	Result
P7 Sisuradio Awards	2011	Swedish Finn of the Year	Grandmother's Dark Eyes	Won
