= The Girl in the Spider's Web (film) =

2018 film by Fede Álvarez

- Theatrical release poster
- Directed by: Fede Álvarez
- Screenplay by: Jay Basu; Fede Álvarez; Steven Knight
- Based on: The Girl in the Spider's Web by David Lagercrantz (Note: Characters introduced in Millennium series by Stieg Larsson)
- Produced by: Scott Rudin; Eli Bush; Ole Søndberg; Søren Stærmose; Berna Levin; Amy Pascal; Elizabeth Cantillon
- Starring: Claire Foy; Sverrir Gudnason; LaKeith Stanfield; Sylvia Hoeks; Stephen Merchant
- Cinematography: Pedro Luque Briozzo
- Edited by: Tatiana S. Riegel
- Music by: Roque Baños
- Production companies: Columbia Pictures; Metro-Goldwyn-Mayer Pictures; Regency Enterprises; Scott Rudin Productions; Yellow Bird; Pascal Pictures; The Cantillon Company; Rose Line Productions; Studio Babelsberg
- Distributed by: Sony Pictures Releasing
- Release dates: October 24, 2018 (Rome Film Festival); October 26, 2018 (Sweden); November 9, 2018 (United States and Canada); November 21, 2018 (United Kingdom); November 22, 2018 (Germany)
- Running time: 115 minutes
- Countries: Germany; Sweden; United Kingdom; United States
- Language: English
- Budget: $43 million
- Box office: $35.2 million

The Girl in the Spider's Web is a 2018 action thriller film directed by Fede Álvarez, who co-wrote the screenplay with Jay Basu and Steven Knight, based on the 2015 novel by David Lagercrantz, which in turn was based on characters introduced in the Millennium book series by Stieg Larsson. The film acts as a soft reboot and sequel to The Girl with the Dragon Tattoo (2011). It stars Claire Foy in the role of Lisbeth Salander, and follows Salander as she battles against a mysterious notorious organization, the Spiders, who seek world dominance. Sverrir Gudnason, Lakeith Stanfield, and Sylvia Hoeks with Synnøve Macody Lund appear in supporting roles.

The Girl in the Spider's Web had its premiere at the Rome Film Festival on October 24, 2018, and was released in Sweden on October 26, and in the United States on November 9, by Sony Pictures Releasing. The film was a box office failure, only grossed $35.2 million worldwide against a production budget of $43 million and received generally mixed reviews from critics, although Foy's performance was praised.

== Plot ==
Two young sisters, Camilla and Lisbeth Salander, play chess at the home of their abusive father, crime lord Alexander Zalachenko. One day, when Zalachenko attempts to molest Camilla, Lisbeth tries to drag her away, to no avail. She eventually leaps from a balcony into a snowdrift and escapes, leaving Camilla behind.

Years later, in Stockholm, Sweden, computer programmer Frans Balder hires Lisbeth, now a vigilante hacker, to retrieve Firefall, a program he developed for the National Security Agency (NSA) that can access the world's nuclear codes. Balder believes it too dangerous to exist. Lisbeth retrieves Firefall from the NSA's servers, but cannot unlock it. NSA agent Edwin Needham tracks the unauthorized login to Stockholm and arrives there seeking Lisbeth and Firefall.

Mercenaries led by Jan Holtser steal the program from Lisbeth and attempt to kill her, though she survives. When she misses a scheduled rendezvous with Balder, he mistakenly believes Lisbeth kept Firefall for herself and contacts Gabrielle Grane, the deputy director of the Swedish Security Service (SÄPO). Grane moves Balder and his young son, August, to a safe house.

Lisbeth and her hacker friend, Plague, contact Lisbeth's former lover, investigative journalist Mikael Blomkvist, for help identifying her assailants. Blomkvist learns that Holtser previously worked for Lisbeth's late father, Zalachenko, and is now affiliated with the "Spiders", an international crime syndicate. Lisbeth puts surveillance on Balder's safe house, and when it is attacked, she intervenes, attempting to protect Balder and August. She is intercepted by Holtser, who kills Balder, frames Lisbeth, and kidnaps August. Lisbeth pursues them and rescues August. She also learns that the Spiders' leader is Camilla, whom Lisbeth believed was dead. After years of physical and sexual abuse by Zalachenko, Camilla faked her suicide and went underground to form the Spiders.

Lisbeth takes August to another safe house, and confirms only he can unlock Firefall. Elsewhere, Needham locates Lisbeth's girlfriend, Sofia, and persuades her to arrange a meeting between them, intending to lure Lisbeth into a trap. Lisbeth evades Needham, who is later arrested by SÄPO. Lisbeth helps Needham escape in exchange for him escorting August to San Francisco to reunite him with his mother; she agrees to later give him Firefall.

The Spiders trick August by calling him from his father's cellphone, then track him to Lisbeth's safe house. Camilla and the Spiders take August to her base of operations, the sisters' childhood home. Grane hired the Spiders to retrieve Firefall for her and informed them of Balder's location. However, Camilla, having other plans, kills her.

Using a tracker hidden on August, Lisbeth, Blomkvist, Plague, and Needham locate him. Lisbeth breaks in to give Plague remote computer access to the building's surveillance system. She is caught and taken to where August is being held. Blomkvist is also captured. When Camilla threatens to torture him, Lisbeth tells August to trust her and to reveal the Firefall password. Camilla tries suffocating Lisbeth while describing Zalachenko's abuse.

Armed with a sniper rifle and remotely guided by Plague via computer, Needham fires through walls, eliminating Camilla's henchmen and saving August and Blomkvist. Camilla escapes with the laptop containing Firefall, and Lisbeth pursues her. Holtser, injected with a poison that induces blindness, stumbles onto a road and is fatally hit by Camilla's fleeing car. The vehicle crashes into trees. Camilla, injured, escapes into the nearby woods. Lisbeth pursues her to a clifftop, where Camilla asks why she never returned to rescue her; Lisbeth says that Camilla chose to remain with their father rather than escape with her. Camilla, heavily bleeding, drops the laptop and steps off the cliff before Lisbeth can stop her.

Needham later attempts to access Firefall, only to discover that Lisbeth destroyed it. August is reunited with his mother in the United States. Blomkvist writes an investigative article about the Spider's Web to be published in Millennium, but then deletes it. Lisbeth destroys her childhood home and rides away on her motorcycle.

== Cast ==
- Claire Foy as Lisbeth Salander, a computer hacker who has survived severe emotional and sexual abuse
  - Beau Gadsdon as young Lisbeth Salander
- Sverrir Gudnason as Mikael Blomkvist, a journalist for Millennium and lover/partner of Lisbeth
- Lakeith Stanfield as Edwin Needham, an NSA security expert who is tracking Salander
- Sylvia Hoeks as Camilla Salander, Lisbeth's estranged sister, who is the head of a major crime syndicate
  - Carlotta von Falkenhayn as young Camilla Salander
- Stephen Merchant as Frans Balder, a terminated NSA employee and the creator of the Firefall program
- Christopher Convery as August Balder, Frans' son
- Claes Bang as Jan Holtser, Camilla's accomplice
- Synnøve Macody Lund as Gabriella Grane, the deputy director of the Swedish Security Service
- Cameron Britton as Plague, a computer expert and close associate of Lisbeth
- Vicky Krieps as Erika Berger, the publisher of Millennium
- Andreja Pejić as Sofia, Lisbeth's lover/partner
- Mikael Persbrandt as Alexander Zalachenko, Lisbeth and Camilla Salander's father
- Volker Bruch as Peter Ahlgren
- Pal Sverre Hagen as Ove Levin

== Production ==
=== Development ===
In November 2015, The Hollywood Reporter announced that Sony Pictures Entertainment was planning to develop a new film series based on the Millennium novels, starting from the book The Girl in the Spider's Web by David Lagercrantz. Rooney Mara and Daniel Craig, who portrayed Salander and Blomkvist, respectively, in The Girl with the Dragon Tattoo, would not be back for the film. New actors would be cast, and David Fincher would also not return as director, though he later received an executive producer credit. Steven Knight was announced to be in talks to adapt the novel, while the producers would be Scott Rudin, Amy Pascal, and Elizabeth Cantillon, along with Yellow Bird's Berna Levin, Søren Stærmose, and Ole Sondberg. TheWrap reported that Alicia Vikander was being considered for the role of Salander. However, while promoting Carol, Mara stated that she was still signed for the sequel: "As far as I know I'm doing it until someone tells me otherwise". Tatiana Maslany, Jane Levy and Troian Bellisario were also linked to the project.

=== Casting ===
In November 2016, Variety reported that Sony was in negotiations with Fede Álvarez to direct the film, with Eli Bush as an additional producer. In March 2017, it was announced that the film would feature an entirely new cast, with production set to begin in September 2017. In May 2017, it was reported that Claire Foy was the frontrunner to play Salander, and, in September 2017, Foy was officially cast in the film. Sylvia Hoeks joined the cast in October 2017. The rest of the cast was announced over the next five months.

=== Filming ===
Principal photography began in January 2018 in Berlin, Leipzig Airport then moved to Hamburg February 2–4, for filming at the Kattwyk Bridge; and ended in April 2018, in Stockholm.

=== Music ===
Composer Roque Baños was chosen to provide the score. The recording took place at the newly opened Synchron Stage Vienna in Austria.

== Release ==
The Girl in the Spider's Web was released in the United States on November 9, 2018, by Sony. It was originally scheduled for October 5, 2018, but was moved in March 2017. The first trailer was released on June 7, 2018. The film premiered at the Rome Film Festival on October 24, 2018.

== Reception ==
=== Box office ===
The Girl in the Spider's Web worldwide gross was $35 million, against a production budget of $43 million. Having failed to recover its production budget, it emerged a box-office bomb.

In the United States and Canada, The Girl in the Spider's Web was released alongside The Grinch and Overlord, and was projected to gross $10–15 million from 2,929 theaters in its opening weekend. It made $3 million on its first day, including $635,000 from Thursday night previews. It went on to debut to $8 million, down from the $12.8 million opening of the first film and finishing fifth at the box office. The film fell 68% in its second weekend to $2.8 million, finishing ninth.

=== Critical response ===
On the review aggregator website Rotten Tomatoes, 38% of 239 critics' reviews are positive, with an average rating of 5/10. The website's consensus reads: "The Girl in the Spider's Web focuses on the action elements of its source material for a less complex – and only sporadically effective – franchise reboot." Metacritic, which uses a weighted average, assigned the film a score of 43 out of 100, based on 42 critics, indicating "mixed or average" reviews. Audiences polled by CinemaScore gave the film an average grade of "B" on an A+ to F scale, while PostTrak reported filmgoers gave it a 75% positive score.

Manohla Dargis of The New York Times was critical of Alvarez's action filmmaking touch-ups being "a bummer, at times risible" and giving the story "a wash of murky hues and murkier narrative developments". Chris Nashawaty of Entertainment Weekly gave the film an overall C grade, calling it "a disappointingly safe, by-the-numbers action-thriller" that will be "a letdown for fans who once embraced Salander's bold queerness and bleak nihilism." Peter Sobczynski of RogerEbert.com commended Alvarez for staging the action scenes in a "slick and efficient manner," but criticized the overall film for having a "genuinely terrible story" with "ham-handed storytelling" and reducing Lisbeth Salander to a "nondescript female action hero" with dialed down characteristics. Greg Cwik of Slant Magazine heavily panned Alvarez's film for using a "slick but lifeless aesthetic" that rips off David Fincher's Seven and "suffers from a compulsion to be capital-C cool" with its overly stylistic touches, concluding with: "From its aping of Fincher's style to its purloining of clichés from so many James Bond films and action thrillers before it, The Girl in the Spider's Web is simply chasing the ghosts of other films."

Many critics praised Foy for her portrayal of Lisbeth Salander. Deborah Young of The Hollywood Reporter wrote that Foy did a "respectable job" as the character, while Will Gompertz of BBC.com said she did a "reasonable job in a limited role" that does not go beyond "being a cartoonishly two-dimensional action hero". Brian Truitt of USA Today said, "To her credit, Foy gives her a default cold demeanor and businesslike drive that is nicely upended later on when things do get personal." Rolling Stone's Peter Travers called her "killer good" in the role for "supplying the nuance and grace notes that the too-busy script leaves out." Katie Rife of The A.V. Club wrote that Foy gave an "interesting performance" that "splits the difference between [Rooney] Mara's mannered interpretation of the character and [Noomi] Rapace's more vulnerable work in the role". Kate Erbland of IndieWire felt that Foy gave "the best on-screen depiction of Lisbeth yet," saying she makes her "more human" than the previous incarnations and delivers "a heroine not only worth cheering for, but one worth loving and even understanding."
