= The Girl Who Lived Twice =

2019 novel by David Lagercrantz

- First edition cover
- Author: David Lagercrantz
- Original title: Hon som måste dö
- Translator: George Goulding
- Language: Swedish
- Series: Millennium
- Genre: Crime, mystery, thriller
- Publisher: Norstedts Förlag (Sweden), Quercus (United Kingdom), Alfred A. Knopf (United States)
- Publication date: 22 August 2019
- Publication place: Sweden
- Media type: Print
- Pages: 448
- Preceded by: The Girl Who Takes an Eye for an Eye
- Followed by: The Girl in the Eagle's Talons

The Girl Who Lived Twice (original title in Swedish: Hon som måste dö, lit. 'The Woman Who Must Die') is the sixth novel in the Millennium series. It focuses on the characters Lisbeth Salander and Mikael Blomkvist. Written by David Lagercrantz, it is the third novel in the series not authored by the series' creator and author of the first three Millennium books, Stieg Larsson.

== Plot ==
Mikael Blomkvist is suffering from a creative slump due to a lack of interesting news. The only story he has involves a stock market crash believed to be caused by troll factories, though a lack of evidence has left him uninterested. To make matters worse, he's been unable to contact Lisbeth Salander, and learns that she's sold her apartment.

Unknown to Blomkvist, Salander is in Russia hunting down her twin Camilla, aka Kira. Though she corners her outside a club, she hesitates and Camilla escapes and returns to Sweden with Salander in pursuit. Salander later realizes she hesitated out of guilt over not stopping their father from molesting Camilla as a child.

Blomkvist receives a call from a coroner named Frederika Nyman about a dead homeless man who had Blomkvist's phone number on him and who died under mysterious circumstances. Eyewitness accounts, including reporter Catrin Lindas, who Blomkvist starts dating, suggest the man knew something about controversial Minister of Defense Johannes Forsell. With help from Salander, Lindas, and the police, Blomkvist figures out that the man was Nima Rita, a Sherpa who was a guide on an Everest expedition Forsell was part of where billionaire Klara Engelman died. Injuries sustained in the trip destroyed Rita's mind and he ended up in a mental hospital from which he escaped.

Meanwhile, a seemingly depressed Forsell tries to drown himself, only for Blomkvist to happen upon him and save him. After recovering, Forsell makes his wife Rebekka help him escape the hospital. They go to the home of secret agent Janek Kowalski where Forsell tells Rebekka, and later Lindas, what happened on Everest. Kowalski had Forsell convince GRU agent Victor Grankin to defect. Grankin and Klara planned to expose her husband Stan, a member of crime syndicate Zvesda Bratva, who had Forsell's undersecretary Svante Lindberg, also a member, poison the two. He forced Rita to abandon Klara and later poisoned him to keep him quiet. He also blackmailed Forsell to silence him.

During this, Blomkvist is led into a trap and captured by Camilla's forces. He's taken to an old glassworks and tortured by former GRU agent Ivan Galinov. Camilla's hacker Jurij Bogdanov, fed up with her, leads Salander to the factory and in the ensuing fight, she disfigures her sister's face. Though Salander again hesitates, Camilla ends up committing suicide.

In the aftermath, Rita's story is published by Millennium through Lindas. Lindberg, Engelman, and Galinov all go to jail, Rita receives a proper burial, and Forsell resigns. Blomkvist finishes his story about the stock market crash with a caveat about the culprit added by Salander, who burns down her childhood home to move on.

== Reception ==
A review by The Washington Post noted the focus on Blomkvists character and referred to it as "Salander is less physically present this time — and that’s too bad, because she’s fascinating", but felt the novel had less "violence and gore" that were prominent in the preceding novels. The Guardian felt that while Lagercrantz’s prose is more serviceable than the peculiarly clodhopping original writing, by this point the main characters have, sadly, become subject to the law of diminishing returns – in particular Salander, who is now just another all-purpose kick-ass heroine.
