= Melissa Nordell =

Murdered Swedish fashion model (1979–2001)

- Died: 11 November 2001; Sweden
- Occupation: model
- Known for: her murder, by a boyfriend, was an inspiration for the Millennium novels

Melissa Nordell was a Swedish fashion model, who was murdered when she was 22 years old. Her murder, by a disgruntled boyfriend, had a powerful effect on Stieg Larsson author of the Millennium novels, who published an anthology on honour killings in which the case featured heavily.

During her post-mortem, signs were found she had been the target of violence on other occasions. Her ex-boyfriend confessed to the murder. He admitted buying a stun gun, and remembered using it on her, but claimed he did not remember strangling her. He admitted weighing her body, prior to throwing it off a bridge. Her ex-boyfriend's motive is routinely described as rage over her decision to leave him.

A few months after Nordell's murder, a Muslim woman, living in Sweden, Fadime Sahindal, was murdered by her father. The two murders are regularly compared. Some commentators question why only Sahindal's murder should be characterized as an honour killing. In May 2015 Sweden's TV4 broadcast a documentary about Nordell's murder.
