= The Girl Who Takes an Eye for an Eye =

2017 novel by David Lagercrantz

- First edition cover
- Author: David Lagercrantz
- Original title: Mannen som sökte sin skugga
- Translator: George Goulding
- Language: Swedish
- Series: Millennium
- Genre: Crime, mystery, thriller
- Publisher: Norstedts Förlag (Sweden), Quercus (United Kingdom), Alfred A. Knopf (United States)
- Publication date: 12 September 2017
- Publication place: Sweden
- Media type: Print
- Pages: 347
- Preceded by: The Girl in the Spider's Web
- Followed by: The Girl Who Lived Twice

The Girl Who Takes an Eye for an Eye (original title in Swedish: Mannen som sökte sin skugga, lit. 'The Man Who Sought His Shadow') is the fifth novel in the Millennium series. It focuses on the characters Lisbeth Salander and Mikael Blomkvist. Written by David Lagercrantz, it is the second novel in the series not authored by the series' creator and author of the first three Millennium books, Stieg Larsson, who died of a heart attack in 2004. The novel was released worldwide on 7 September 2017.

== Plot ==
Hacker Lisbeth Salander is serving a two-month jail sentence for the crimes she committed while protecting August Balder. After threats arise against her, she is transferred to maximum security Flodberga Prison, which is rife with corruption. There, Bangladeshi prisoner Faria Kasi is tormented nightly by prisoner Beatrice "Benito" Andersson.

One day, Salander is visited by former guardian Holger Palmgren. During their conversation, Palmgren mentions a visit he received from a former secretary from St Stefan's, where she was committed as a child, who gave him Salander's medical files which led him to believe she was involved in something called the Registry. Suspicious, Salander forces the Warden to let her use his computer, and learns the Registry is a secret project that places exceptional children in specific environments to test the effects on their growth.

Unable to do anything from prison, Salander asks journalist Mikael Blomkvist to investigate in her stead, pointing him to wealthy businessman Leo Mannheimer, whose name was in a Registry file she found. During his investigation, Blomkvist learns that Mannheimer had recently begun acting strangely and suspecting that not only does he have a twin, Dan Brody, but Brody has been going around pretending to be Mannheimer.

Meanwhile, Palmgren, while going through Salander's file, recognizes the name Martin Steinberg and calls him. Steinberg panics and contacts his associate Rakel Greitz who, despite dying from stomach cancer, enters Palmgren's house pretending to be a nurse, poisons him and takes the file. Blomkvist arrives too late to save him, but in his dying breaths Palmgren tells him to find Hilda von Kanterborg, a former Registry agent whose initials were in the file.

Blomkvist tracks Hilda down and, though she does not believe Dan stole Leo's identity, she confirms that they are twins. She also says that Greitz tried to take Salander away from her family as a child as part of the experiment, only for her to react violently and escape. What they do not know is she then hid in a church and saw a statue of a dragon being slain, which inspired her to fight against the unjust and don her dragon tattoo.

Blomkvist then confronts Mannheimer who, after saving him from Greitz' henchman Benjamin, reveals that he is Dan. Having grown up on a farm with an abusive adopted father, Dan found a passion for music and eventually fled to America, where he lived as a jazz musician. After being mistaken for Leo by a co-worker, he saw that they looked alike and came to Sweden to find him. After spending time together, they confronted Greitz together for answers. She and Benjamin caught them off guard and poisoned Leo, blackmailing Dan into burying him and taking his identity. However, Dan secretly saved his brother's life and help him escape. They ended taking each other's identity, with Leo living in America, while plotting revenge.

While this is happening, the Warden of Flodberga makes plans to transfer Benito to another prison. Upon learning this, Benito prepares to kill Faria, which she reveals she was hired to do by Faria's brothers. However, Salander stops and severely injures her, sending her to the hospital.

After she is released, Salander, aided by Blomkvist's sister Annika, looks into Faria's history: she had been treated as a slave and object by her religious older brothers Bashir and Ahmed, who planned on selling her into marriage with a rich man. That fell apart when she fell in love with Jamal Chowdhury, a Bangladeshi national who was branded a heretic by Islamist extremists. On the two older brothers' orders, younger brother Khalil murdered Jamal, leading to Faria pushing Ahmed to his death in anger, resulting in her arrest and Bashir hiring Benito.

Salander tricks Bashir into confessing on video, and convinces Khalil to do the same to the police after Bashir flees. She then plans to go after Greitz when Blomkvist tells her what he has found, only to be kidnapped by Bashir and an escaped Benito. She gets an alert out to her hacker allies, who track the truck they are in and alert the police. With Faria's help, the police find them just as Salander escapes and arrest Benito, Bashir, and their colleagues. After recovering from a wound sustained in her escape, Salander confronts and subdues Greitz and Benjamin, deciding to spare the former so she can suffer the shame of her reputation being ruined as she is arrested.

Faria's charges are lowered and she is presumably released. The people, Steinberg included, involved are sent to prison and, though preempted by a stock market crash, Millennium publishes Leo and Dan's story. Everyone who knew Palmgren gather for his funeral, where Salander makes a speech about her guardian.

== Reception ==
A review by The Washington Post says The Girl Who Takes an Eye for an Eye "intensifies the mythic elements of Larsson's vision" and is entertaining. However, The Guardian says that "There is a sluggishness to the plotting and much of the tension relies on orchestrated interruptions and delays, which irritate". The review in USA Today calls Salander a fascinating character, and warns potential readers the reviewer thought she was not present for too much of the novel. Paste magazine's review also noted the relative absence of Salander, asserting that Lagercrantz seemed to prefer focusing on new characters that he invented.
