= The Girl with the Dragon Tattoo (2009 film) =

Film by Niels Arden Oplev

- Swedish theatrical release poster
- Swedish: Män som hatar kvinnor
- Directed by: Niels Arden Oplev
- Screenplay by: Rasmus Heisterberg; Nikolaj Arcel
- Based on: The Girl with the Dragon Tattoo by Stieg Larsson
- Produced by: Søren Stærmose
- Starring: Michael Nyqvist; Noomi Rapace; Ingvar Hirdwall; Björn Granath; Lena Endre; Ewa Fröling; Marika Lagercrantz
- Cinematography: Eric Kress
- Edited by: Anne Østerud
- Music by: Jacob Groth
- Production companies: Yellow Bird; ZDF Enterprises; Sveriges Television; Nordisk Film; ZDF; Filmpool Stockholm-Mälardalen; Film i Väst; Spiltan Underhållning
- Distributed by: Nordisk Film (Sweden/Denmark); NFP Marketing & Film Distribution; Warner Bros Pictures (Germany)
- Release dates: 27 February 2009 (Sweden and Denmark); 1 October 2009 (Germany)
- Running time: 153 minutes
- Countries: Sweden; Denmark; Germany
- Language: Swedish
- Budget: $13 million
- Box office: $104 million

The Girl with the Dragon Tattoo (Swedish: Män som hatar kvinnor, lit. 'Men Who Hate Women') is a 2009 crime thriller film directed by Niels Arden Oplev from a screenplay by Rasmus Heisterberg and Nikolaj Arcel, and produced by Søren Stærmose. The film is based on the 2005 novel, the first entry in his Millennium series, by Swedish writer Stieg Larsson. It stars Michael Nyqvist and Noomi Rapace.

That same year, two sequels—The Girl Who Played with Fire and The Girl Who Kicked the Hornets' Nest—were released in September and November, respectively. The following year, all three were expanded into the six-part Millenium television miniseries.

== Plot ==
Journalist Mikael Blomkvist, co-owner of the magazine Millennium, loses a high-profile libel case against billionaire Hans-Erik Wennerström, resulting in a looming prison sentence. Meanwhile, Lisbeth Salander, a brilliant but troubled hacker, is commissioned to run a background check on Blomkvist.

Henrik Vanger, the elderly patriarch of the affluent Vanger family, hires Blomkvist to investigate the disappearance of his niece, Harriet, who had vanished in 1966 during a family gathering. Henrik suspects foul play by his family, many of whom had Nazi connections.

Salander struggles under the control of her abusive guardian, Nils Bjurman. After enduring severe abuse, including rape, she gains the upper hand by blackmailing Bjurman, securing her financial independence and personal safety.

Blomkvist, living on the Vanger estate, discovers a list of names and numbers in Harriet's diary, linked to biblical verses. Salander, secretly accessing Blomkvist’s files, identifies the biblical references and joins Blomkvist, proposing they might relate to a series of unsolved murders connected to antisemitic motives within the Vanger family.

Their investigation leads them to suspect Martin, Harriet’s brother, who eventually captures Blomkvist. In Martin's custody, Blomkvist learns of the serial murders conducted by Martin and his late father. Salander arrives in time to rescue Blomkvist, and Martin dies in a subsequent car crash.

The duo discover that Harriet is alive in Australia, having escaped to avoid further abuse. Reunited with Henrik, she explains that she sent him annual pressed flowers as a signal that she was still alive.

The film closes as Blomkvist, aided by Salander, publishes an exposé on Wennerström, which revitalises his career and leads to Wennerström’s downfall. Salander, having secretly transferred Wennerström's funds, begins a new life under a new identity.

== Cast ==
- Michael Nyqvist as Mikael Blomkvist
- Noomi Rapace as Lisbeth Salander
- Lena Endre as Erika Berger
- Sven-Bertil Taube as Henrik Vanger
- Peter Haber as Martin Vanger
- Peter Andersson as Nils Bjurman
- Marika Lagercrantz as Cecilia Vanger
- Ingvar Hirdwall as Dirch Frode
- Björn Granath as Gustav Morell
- Ewa Fröling as Harriet Vanger
- Michalis Koutsogiannakis as Dragan Armansky
- Annika Hallin as Annika Giannini
- Tomas Köhler as "Plague"
- Gunnel Lindblom as Isabella Vanger
- Gösta Bredefeldt as Harald Vanger
- Stefan Sauk as Hans-Erik Wennerström
- Jacob Ericksson as Christer Malm
- Julia Sporre as young Harriet Vanger
- Tehilla Blad as young Lisbeth Salander
- Sofia Ledarp as Malin Eriksson
- David Dencik as Janne Dahlman
- Reuben Sallmander as Enrico Giannini
- Alexandra Hummingson as an unnamed journalist

== Release ==
=== Critical response ===
The Girl with the Dragon Tattoo was well received by critics. The review aggregator website Rotten Tomatoes gives the film a normalised score of 85% based on 192 reviews, with an average score of 7.3/10. The critical consensus is: "Its graphic violence and sprawling length will prove too much for some viewers to take, but Noomi Rapace's gripping performance makes The Girl With the Dragon Tattoo an unforgettable viewing experience." Metacritic gives the film a weighted average score of 76 based on reviews from 36 critics. Roger Ebert of the Chicago Sun-Times gave the film four out of four, noting that "[the film] is a compelling thriller to begin with, but it adds the rare quality of having a heroine more fascinating than the story".

=== Box office ===
The film grossed more than $10 million in the US and Canada in a limited release of 202 theatres. The total gross worldwide is $104,617,430.

=== Awards and nominations ===
Association	Category	Nominee	Result
Amanda Award	Best Foreign Feature Film	Niels Arden Oplev	Nominated
BAFTA Award	Best Actress in a Leading Role	Noomi Rapace	Nominated
BAFTA Award	Best Adapted Screenplay	Nikolaj Arcel and Rasmus Heisterberg	Nominated
BAFTA Award	Best Film Not in the English Language	Niels Arden Oplev	Won
Broadcast Film Critics Association Award	Best Actress	Noomi Rapace	Nominated
Broadcast Film Critics Association Award	Best Foreign Language Film	Niels Arden Oplev	Won
Empire Awards	Best Thriller		Won
Empire Awards	Best Actress	Noomi Rapace	Won
European Film Awards	Audience Award	Niels Arden Oplev	Nominated
European Film Awards	Best Actress	Noomi Rapace	Nominated
European Film Awards	Best Composer	Jacob Groth	Nominated
Guldbagge Award	Audience Award	Niels Arden Oplev	Won
Guldbagge Award	Best Actress	Noomi Rapace	Won
Guldbagge Award	Best Film	Søren Stærmose	Won
Guldbagge Award	Best Cinematography	Eric Kress	Nominated
Guldbagge Award	Best Supporting Actor	Sven-Bertil Taube	Nominated
Houston Film Critics Society Award	Best Foreign Language Film		Won
Houston Film Critics Society Award	Best Actress in a Leading Role	Noomi Rapace	Nominated
London Film Critics Circle Award	Actress of the Year	Noomi Rapace	Nominated
New York Film Critics Online Award	Breakthrough Performer	Noomi Rapace	Won
Palm Springs International Film Festival	Audience Award for Best Narrative Feature	Niels Arden Oplev	Won
Satellite Award	Best Actress – Motion Picture Drama	Noomi Rapace	Won
Satellite Award	Best Foreign Language Film		Won
Satellite Award	Best Adapted Screenplay	Nikolaj Arcel and Rasmus Heisterberg	Nominated
St. Louis Gateway Film Critics Association Award	Best Actress	Noomi Rapace	Nominated
St. Louis Gateway Film Critics Association Award	Best Foreign Language Film		Nominated
Washington D.C. Area Film Critics Association Award	Best Foreign Language Film		Nominated

== TV miniseries ==
French premium pay television channel Canal+ aired extended versions of the three films as a miniseries between March and June 2010, before the theatrical release of the second and third films, consisting of six parts of 90 minutes each. The first part attracted 1.2 million viewers, the largest audience of a foreign series at Canal+ that year. The series aired on US pay-for-view cable networks in the weeks leading up to the release of David Fincher's 2011 film adaptation of the novel.

A home video set of all six parts of the miniseries was released on DVD and Blu-ray Disc by Music Box Home Entertainment on 6 December 2011.

== See also ==
- The Girl with the Dragon Tattoo (American adaptation)
