= The Girl Who Played with Fire =

2006 novel by Stieg Larsson

- First edition cover
- Author: Stieg Larsson
- Original title: Flickan som lekte med elden
- Translator: Reg Keeland, pseudonym of Steven T. Murray
- Language: Swedish
- Series: Millennium
- Genre: Crime, mystery, thriller
- Publisher: Norstedts Förlag (Swedish)
- Publication date: June 2006
- Publication place: Sweden
- English publication date: 2009
- Media type: Print (paperback & hardback)
- Pages: 576 (paperback)
- Preceded by: The Girl with the Dragon Tattoo
- Followed by: The Girl Who Kicked the Hornets' Nest

The Girl Who Played with Fire (Swedish: Flickan som lekte med elden) is a psychological thriller novel by Swedish author Stieg Larsson. It was published posthumously in Swedish in 2006 and in English in January 2009.

The book features many of the characters who appeared in The Girl with the Dragon Tattoo (2005), among them the title character, Lisbeth Salander, a brilliant computer hacker and social misfit, and Mikael Blomkvist, an investigative journalist and publisher of Millennium magazine.

Widely seen as a critical success, The Girl Who Played with Fire was also (according to The Bookseller magazine) the first and only translated novel to be number one in the UK hardback chart.

== Synopsis ==
After a yearlong sojourn to Grenada, Lisbeth Salander uses three billion laundered kronor to purchase a new apartment in Stockholm. She re-establishes contact with Dragan Armansky, her former boss at Milton Securities, and her former legal guardian Holger Palmgren. Nils Bjurman, who had previously raped Salander, focuses his attention on capturing her and destroying the film she made of his crime. Reviewing her medical records, he identifies a person from her past as his strongest ally. Mikael Blomkvist, the publisher of Millennium magazine, who had lost contact with Salander since her absence, sees her being attacked by a member of the Svavelsjö outlaw motorcycle club. He attempts to help, to Salander's astonishment, and their joint efforts enable her to evade her attacker.

Millennium is approached by Dag Svensson and Mia Johansson, who have put together a report concerning sex trafficking in Sweden and the abuse of underage girls by high-ranking figures. Everyone is intrigued by recurring mentions of "Zala", a mysterious figure heavily involved in the sex-trafficking industry. Salander, hacking Blomkvist's computer, is taken aback by the mention of Zala, and visits Svensson and Johansson to ask questions. Later that same night, Blomkvist finds the couple shot dead in their apartment. With Salander's fingerprints on the murder weapon, and her formal record establishing a history of violent instability, she is implicated in the double murder. Bjurman is also found dead, shot by the same weapon; Salander is the prime suspect.

Eager to clear Salander's name and realizing that she has hacked into his notebook computer, Blomkvist leaves her notes on his desktop; her replies point him to "Zala". Blomkvist confronts Gunnar Björck, a policeman on sick leave and one of the high-ranking abusers identified by Svensson and Johansson, who agrees to disclose information about Zala if Blomkvist leaves him out of Millennium's exposé. Miriam Wu, Salander's best friend and current sex partner, is taken in for questioning by the police. After her release, Paolo Roberto, Salander's former boxing coach, witnesses her being kidnapped into a van by Salander's earlier attacker, aided by a "blond giant". He follows them to a warehouse south of Nykvarn, where he attempts to fight the giant and manages to escape with Wu. The giant recovers and sets the warehouse on fire to destroy the evidence.

Visiting Bjurman's summer cabin, Salander finds a classified Säpo file and begins to make the connection between Bjurman and Zala, whose real name is Alexander Zalachenko. By coincidence, two members of the motorcycle club, Carl-Magnus Lundin (Salander's attacker) and Sonny Nieminen, have been dispatched to burn the place down. Salander incapacitates them, leaving suspects for the police to find. She returns to her apartment and, having no choice, decides to find and kill Zalachenko. She discovers the identity of the giant, Ronald Niedermann, and traces him to a post office box in Gothenburg. Meanwhile, Blomkvist manages to find Salander's new apartment as well as the DVD revealing Bjurman's crime.

With information from Björck and Palmgren, Blomkvist pieces together the entire story: Zalachenko is a former Soviet defector whose very existence is kept classified by Säpo. Initially an intelligence source, Zalachenko began to traffic in sex slaves on the side. He became the partner of a 17-year-old girl who became pregnant with twins, Lisbeth and Camilla. Zalachenko was an itinerant father who habitually abused his partner, culminated in Lisbeth's deliberately setting his car alight while her father was in it. The authorities imprisoned Salander and declared her insane, since acknowledging Zalachenko's crimes would require them to divulge his existence. Niedermann had killed Svensson and Johansson on Zalachenko's orders; Bjurman, who was involved with Zalachenko, played a role in the murders and was killed to ensure his silence.

Between Blomkvist's testimony, Salander's various character witnesses, and the additional suspects piling up, the police are forced to admit that their original suspicions were wrong. Blomkvist finds Niedermann's Göteborg address and sets off for the farm where he and Zalachenko await. There, Salander is captured and brought before Zalachenko. She is shot when she attempts to escape and is buried by Niedermann, not realising she is still alive. Battling through immense pain, Salander slowly digs herself out and attempts to kill Zalachenko with an axe. On his way to Göteborg, Blomkvist captures Niedermann and ties him against a signpost by the road. The book ends as Blomkvist finds Salander and calls emergency services.

== Characters ==
=== Main characters ===
- Mikael Blomkvist – A journalist and publisher at Millennium magazine
- Lisbeth Salander – A private investigator, hacker, and accused triple-murderer
- Alexander Zalachenko (Zala) a.k.a. Karl Axel Bodin – A former Soviet spy who turns out to be deeply involved in Salander's dark past
- Ronald Niedermann a.k.a. The Giant – Zalachenko's henchman who is connected to Salander in a way which she does not realise
- Carl-Magnus Lundin – The President of Svavelsjö Motorcycle Club (Svavelsjö MC) who sells drugs and is commissioned to kidnap Salander for Zala

=== Related to Millennium magazine ===
- Erika Berger – Editor in chief of Millennium magazine and Blomkvist's on–off lover
- Harriet Vanger – Majority investor in Millennium
- Malin Eriksson – Managing editor of Millennium magazine
- Christer Malm – Art director and designer of Millennium magazine
- Dag Svensson – A journalist who is writing an exposé on the Swedish sex trade and Mia’s boyfriend
- Mia Johansson – A doctoral student in criminology and Dag’s girlfriend
- Henry Cortez – Part-time journalist at Millennium magazine
- Lotta Karim – Part-time journalist at Millennium magazine
- Monika Nillson – Journalist at Millennium magazine

=== Related to Milton Security ===
- Dragan Armansky – Salander's former boss and director of Milton Security
- Sonny Bohman – A former policeman and part of the team Armansky assigns to support the police investigation
- Johan Fräklund – Chief of Operations at Milton Security and assigned to support police investigation
- Niklas Hedström – Works for Milton Security and is assigned to support police investigation but sabotages it. A heart problem kept him from becoming a police man. He hates Salander since she caught him blackmailing a client

=== Related to police investigation ===
- Jan Bublanski – A police officer who is in charge of Salander's case, nicknamed Officer Bubble
- Sonja Modig – A detective in Bublanski's team
- Richard Ekström – A prosecutor of Salander's case
- Hans Faste – Working in Bublanski's team, causing trouble with his sexually discriminating attitude
- Curt Andersson – Police officer in Bublanski's team
- Jerker Holmberg – Police officer in Bublanski's team

=== Other characters ===
- Annika Gianinni – Blomkvist's sister and an attorney
- Miriam "Mimmi" Wu – A kickboxer, university student and Salander's on and off girlfriend
- Nils Bjurman – An attorney and Salander's current guardian since Palmgren's stroke
- Paolo Roberto – A former professional boxer and Salander's boxing instructor. The character is based on the real boxer Paolo Roberto.
- Gunnar Björk – A Swedish Security Police officer and former punter abusing women. He is also the lead source for Blomkvist on Zalachenko.
- Holger Palmgren – Lisbeth Salander's former guardian; she visits him in a rehabilitation home and they play a game of chess together. In her memoir "There Are Things I Want You to Know" About Stieg Larsson and Me, Eva Gabrielsson tells readers that this chess game was inspired by her brother Björn who Stieg Larsson used to play the game with and with whom he was very close.
- Greger Beckman – Erika Berger's husband
- George Bland – Black teenage boy whom Salander has an affair with in Grenada
- Richard Forbes – Reverend and Salander's hotel room neighbour in Grenada
- Geraldine Forbes – A millionaire heiress and battered wife of Richard Forbes
- Sonny Nieminen – Part of Svavelsjö MC and involved in trying to kidnap Salander

== Reception ==
The English version was published in January 2009 and immediately became a number 1 bestseller.

Most of the reviewers concentrated mainly on the character of Lisbeth Salander, with Mark Lawson at the Guardian saying that "the huge pleasure of these books is Salander, a fascinating creation with a complete and complex psychology." Boyd Tonkin in The Independent said: "the spiky and sassy Lisbeth Salander – punkish wild child, traumatised survivor of the 'care' system, sexual adventurer and computer hacker of genius" was "the most original heroine to emerge in crime fiction for many years". Michiko Kakutani at The New York Times wrote that "Salander and Blomkvist, transcend their genre and insinuate themselves in the reader’s mind through their oddball individuality, their professional competence and, surprisingly, their emotional vulnerability."

== Cultural notes ==
The character of Paolo Roberto is an actual person. He is a former boxer and television chef who has also dabbled in politics. He played himself in the 2009 film adaptation of the book.

In the first part of the book, Salander is exploring Dimensions in Mathematics apparently written by L. C. Parnault and published by Harvard University Press in 1999. On February 9, 2009, Harvard University Press announced on their website that this book and the author are purely fictitious.

The mysterious Karl Axel Bodin, in whose house Salander finds Zalachenko and Niedermann, is a historical name. Bodin was born in Karlstad and later moved to Sundsvall. He went to Norway to join the Waffen-SS; at the end of World War II, he was attached to the country's branch of the Gestapo. At the war's end, Bodin and another Swedish volunteer stole a car in an attempted escape to Sweden. The car's owner saw the theft, and soon a gunfight erupted in which the car owner and Bodin's friend were shot. Bodin left his friend behind and crossed the border.

== Film and television adaptations ==
- The Girl Who Played with Fire, a 2009 Swedish-Danish film directed by Daniel Alfredson.
- Millennium, a Swedish six-part television miniseries based on the film adaptations of Stieg Larsson's series of the same name, was broadcast on SVT1 from 20 March 2010 to 24 April 2010. The series was produced by Yellow Bird in cooperation with several production companies, including SVT, Nordisk Film, Film i Väst, and ZDF Enterprises.
- Dragon Tattoo Trilogy: Extended Edition is the title of the TV miniseries release on DVD, Blu-ray, and video on demand in the US. This version of the miniseries comprises nine hours of story content, including over two hours of additional footage not seen in the theatrical versions of the original Swedish-Danish films. The four-disc set includes two hour special features and extended editions of The Girl with the Dragon Tattoo, The Girl Who Played with Fire and The Girl Who Kicked the Hornet's Nest.
