= The Girl Who Kicked the Hornets' Nest =

2007 novel by Stieg Larsson

- First edition cover
- Author: Stieg Larsson
- Original title: Luftslottet som sprängdes
- Translator: Reg Keeland, pseudonym of Steven T. Murray
- Language: Swedish
- Series: Millennium
- Genre: Crime, mystery, thriller
- Publisher: Norstedts Förlag (Swedish)
- Publication date: May 2007
- Publication place: Sweden
- English publication date: October 2009
- Media type: Print (paperback and hardback)
- Pages: 720 (paperback)
- Preceded by: The Girl Who Played with Fire
- Followed by: The Girl in the Spider's Web

The Girl Who Kicked the Hornets' Nest (original title in Swedish: Luftslottet som sprängdes, lit. 'The Castle in the Air That Was Blown up') is a psychological thriller novel by Swedish author Stieg Larsson. It was published in Swedish in 2007; in English, in the United Kingdom, in October 2009; and in the United States and Canada on 25 May 2010. The three novels in the Millennium series, The Girl with the Dragon Tattoo (2005), The Girl Who Played with Fire (2006), and The Girl who Kicked the Hornets' Nest were written by Larsson and were published posthumously after his fatal heart attack in 2004. All three novels were adapted as films.

== Plot ==
It picks up where The Girl Who Played with Fire left off. A severely wounded Lisbeth Salander is placed in intensive care at Sahlgrenska Hospital, two rooms away from her also-injured father, Alexander Zalachenko, whom Salander injured with an axe. Ronald Niedermann, Zalachenko's son and Salander's half-brother, steals 800,000 kronor from an outlaw motorcycle gang before disappearing. These events prompt immediate action from "the Section", a secret counterintelligence division of Säpo which shielded the abusive Zalachenko and forcibly institutionalized Salander after she attempted to kill him as a child. Evert Gullberg, founder and former chief of the Section, plots to deflect attention by silencing Salander, Zalachenko, and Mikael Blomkvist, the publisher of Millennium magazine. Meanwhile, Dr. Peter Teleborian, the corrupt psychiatrist who abused Salander during her institutionalization, provides prosecutor Richard Ekström with a false psychiatric examination so that she can be recommitted.

Gullberg, who has terminal cancer, shoots Zalachenko in his hospital bed. He attempts to enter Salander's room to kill her as well, but is thwarted by her lawyer, Annika Giannini, leading to him committing suicide. Section operatives also murder Gunnar Björk, Zalachenko's former Säpo handler and Blomkvist's source of information for an upcoming exposé; the operatives falsify the death as a suicide. Other operatives break into Blomkvist's apartment and mug Giannini, making off with copies of the classified Säpo file that contains Zalachenko's identity and planting bugs in the homes and phones of Millennium staff. The timing of the attacks and the property that was taken cause Blomkvist to realise that the phones are tapped, and he begins to investigate the Section in earnest.

Blomkvist hires Dragan Armanskij's Milton Security to handle countersurveillance. Armansky, on his own initiative, informs Säpo official Torsten Edklinth about the violations of Salander's constitutional rights. Edklinth, along with his assistant Rosa Figuerola, begins a clandestine investigation into the Section. After Figuerola confirms the allegations, Edklinth contacts the Justice Minister and the Prime Minister, who approve a full investigation and later invite Blomkvist to a confidential meeting in which they are to share information. They agree to Blomkvist's deadline—he intends to publish his findings about the Section's actions on 15 July, the third day of Salander's trial, and the government agree to arrest any identified ringleaders of the Section at the same time.

Blomkvist arranges to have Salander's handheld computer returned to her, and has a cellular phone placed in a duct near her room to give her an online hotspot through which to maintain contact with the outside world. Meanwhile, Blomkvist, Armanskij, and their allies continue their joint counter-surveillance of the "Zalachenko club", feeding them misinformation about Millennium's (supposed) passivity regarding Salander's trial, identifying nine central players in the Section. The Section catch on to the ruse and arrange to plant cocaine in Blomkvist's apartment and hire two members of the Yugoslav mafia to murder him; their intention is to frame him as a drug dealer and thus destroy his credibility. The dual plot is foiled, and Blomkvist and Berger are spirited off to a safehouse.

On the third day of Salander's trial, Millennium's exposé causes a media frenzy and officers of the Section are arrested. Giannini systematically destroys Teleborian's testimony, proving that he and the Section conspired to commit Salander to protect Zalachenko and that his recent "psychiatric assessment" of her was fabricated. The most powerful testimony on Salander's behalf is the playing in court of the secret video recording Salander made of her rape by her former guardian, which Teleborian had dismissed as a schizophrenic fantasy. Teleborian is then arrested for possession of child pornography. Ekström, realising that the law is on Salander's side, withdraws all charges against her, and her declaration of incompetence is rescinded.

Freed, Salander spends several months at Gibraltar. She soon discovers that, as Zalachenko's daughter, she is obliged to inherit half of his properties and wealth, while the other half goes to her twin sister Camilla, whom no one has heard from in more than a decade. Suspicious about an abandoned factory in her father's estate, she goes there to investigate. There, she discovers Niedermann, who had been hiding there from the police. After a brief struggle and chase, Salander outwits Niedermann by nailing his feet to the plank floor with a nail gun. She is tempted to kill him herself, but instead reports his location to the biker gang, and then reports the entire brawl to the police. Back at her apartment in Stockholm, Salander receives a visit from Blomkvist. The story ends with the two reconciling as friends.

== Characters from Larsson's life ==
- Svante Branden helps Salander "by denouncing the fraudulent analysis of Dr. Peter Teleborian and the arbitrary internment to which he had subjected her." Larsson and his life partner Eva Gabrielsson were loaned a student room by the real Svante Branden who, after being neighbors with Larsson in Umeå, was a psychiatrist and a friend. In her book "There Are Things I Want You to Know" About Stieg Larsson and Me, Gabrielsson writes that the character and the person were a lot alike because Svante "was against every form of violation of human rights and freedom. When Stieg made him one of the heroes of The Millennium Trilogy, it was a way of paying homage to him."
- Anders Jonasson, the doctor who helps Salander significantly throughout her hospital stay, is based on Anders Jakobsson, a longtime friend of Stieg Larsson and Eva Gabrielsson's. His name was changed in the novel to Jonasson after he ran into Erland, Larsson's father, in a supermarket and loudly denounced him in no uncertain terms as a tomb raider after Gabrielsson was denied access to Larsson's estate after his death.
- Kurdo Baksi, Kurdish-Swedish publisher of Black and White magazine and collaborator with Stieg Larsson at the Expo Foundation, appears "as himself" in the books, along with his publishing house.

== Reception ==
The Girl Who Kicked the Hornet's Nest was listed at the top of Amazon's bestseller list before arriving in bookstores, extremely unusual for an English-language book in translation. Just as unusually, this book was not made available in paperback until 21 February 2012, or more than two years after its original English-language publication in October 2009, probably because it still regularly appeared in Top 10 best seller lists as a hardcover book (e.g., rated #5 in the New York Times best seller list for the week ending 29 January 2012).

The Millennium series is described in a New York Times review as "utterly addicting", and this, the third in the series, received a good review. Salander is described as "one of the most original characters in a thriller to come along in a while." The combination of her resourcefulness, intelligence and apparent fragility underlies her ability to win the battle to have her re-institutionalised. The compelling character of Salander and her past, completely explained in the volume of the trilogy, is a counterpoint to Blomkvist's more mundane character, writes the reviewer. The novel itself is compared to John le Carré's cold-war thrillers. Writing for The Guardian, Kate Mosse declares that The Girl Who Kicked the Hornet's Nest is a "grown-up work for grown-up readers", which she says shows a well-presented plausible narrative. The Los Angeles Times disagrees, describing the plots as "improbable", but notes the popularity of the series, referring to it as "an authentic phenomenon". Writing for The Washington Post, Patrick Anderson claims the third in the series "brings the saga to a satisfactory conclusion".

The overly long and complicated plot is criticised by Marcel Berlins writing for The Sunday Times. The Los Angeles Times critic agrees, pointing at the implausibility of Larsson's plot, the weak writing and characterisations.

== Publication history ==
Larsson submitted the book to two Swedish publishers, with Norstedts Förlag accepting the manuscript for publication. Norstedts commissioned Steve Murray under the pen-name of Reg Keeland to undertake the English translation.

Alfred A. Knopf bought the rights to the book, along with the preceding two volumes in the series, after Larsson's death in 2004. The Girl Who Kicked the Hornets' Nest was published with a first print-run of 800,000 copies.

== Film and TV adaptations ==
- The Girl Who Kicked the Hornets' Nest (film)
- Millennium (miniseries), a Swedish six-part television miniseries based on the film adaptations of Stieg Larsson's series of the same name, was broadcast on SVT1 from 20 March 2010 to 24 April 2010. The series was produced by Yellow Bird in cooperation with several production companies, including SVT, Nordisk Film, Film i Västm, and ZDF Enterprises.
- Dragon Tattoo Trilogy: Extended Edition is the title of the TV miniseries release on DVD, Blu-ray, and video on demand in the US. This version of the miniseries comprises nine hours of story content, including over two hours of additional footage not seen in the theatrical versions of the original Swedish films.
