= David Lagercrantz =

Swedish journalist and author (born 1962)

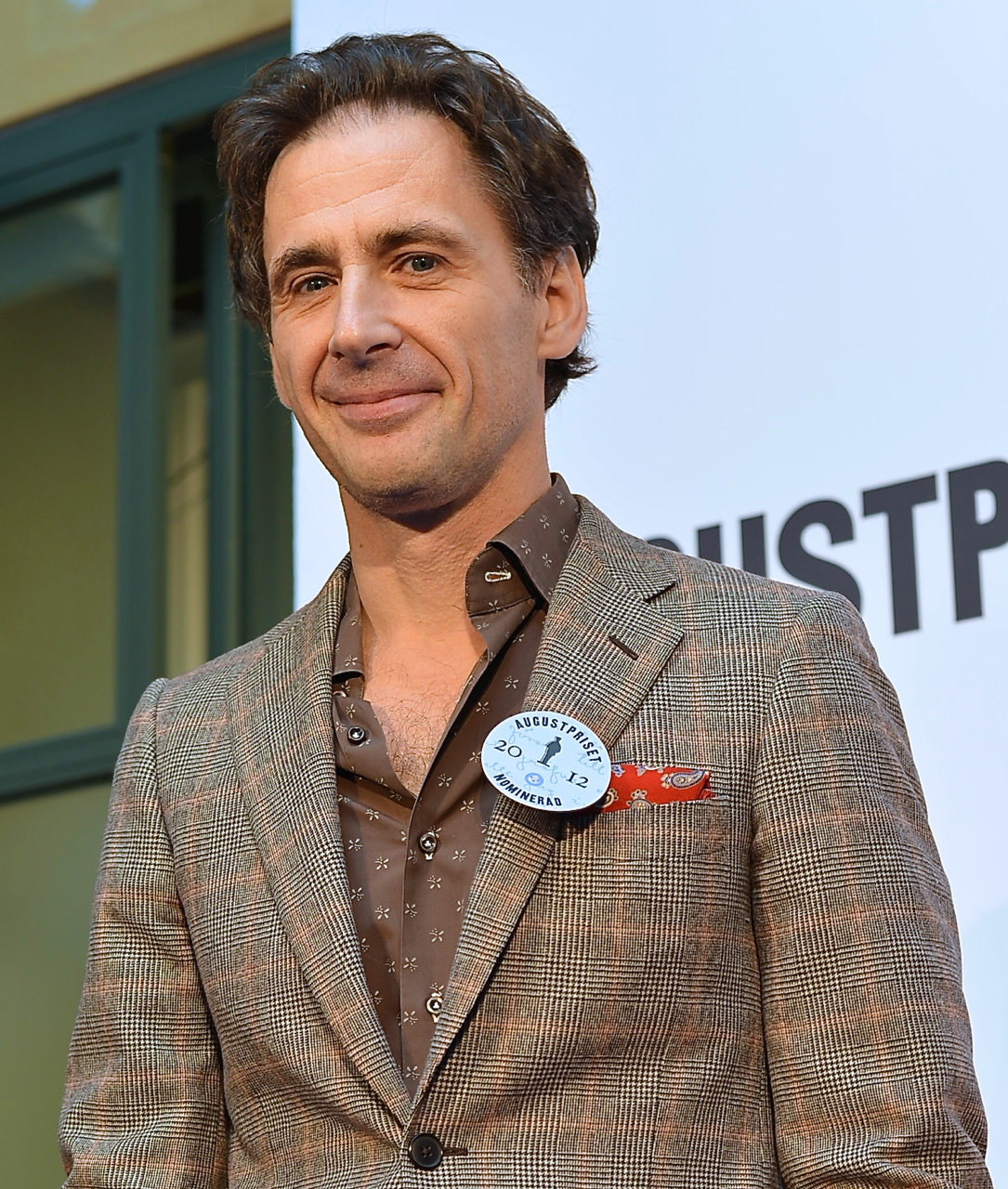
- Lagercrantz in 2012
- Born: 4 September 1962 (age 63) Solna, Sweden
- Occupation: Journalist, novelist
- Genre: Biographies, crime fiction and journalism
- Relatives: Olof Lagercrantz (father); Martina Ruin (mother); Marika Lagercrantz (sister)

Website
- www.davidlagercrantz.com

David Lagercrantz (born 4 September 1962) is a Swedish journalist and bestselling writer known as the author of I am Zlatan Ibrahimovic and The Girl in the Spider's Web, the fourth through sixth installments in the Millennium series. He is also a columnist for Swedish Newspaper Expressen.

== Biography ==
David Lagercrantz is the youngest of five siblings. His father was author and editor-in-chief Olof Lagercrantz (1911–2002), whose parents were banker Carl Lagercrantz and Countess Agnes Hamilton; the latter was the great-granddaughter of poet and historian Erik Gustaf Geijer. David Lagercrantz's mother, Finnish-Swedish Martina Ruin (1921–2019), was the daughter of the philosopher and author Hans Ruin. The actress Marika Lagercrantz is David Lagercrantz's sister.

In interviews, David Lagercrantz has spoken of his fear of failure in an intellectually eminent family, of early depression, and of the strained relationship with his father. After graduating from Kungsholmens gymnasium in Stockholm, David Lagercrantz studied philosophy and religious history, and obtained a degree in journalism from University of Gothenburg. Enticed by a peculiar job advertisement, he took a position as a crime reporter at local newspaper Sundsvalls Tidning, and subsequently worked at evening paper Expressen, where he covered the major criminal cases of the time, one of which he later described in his book Änglarna i Åmsele (The Angels in Åmsele). Though his time as a crime reporter was formative in many ways, he eventually had enough and moved into freelance journalism.

In 1996, Lagercrantz wrote a piece about the adventurer Göran Kropp who, mere days after a disaster on Mount Everest in which eight people died, reached the summit without sherpa or oxygen. The piece turned into Lagercrantz's first book, Göran Kropp 8000 Plus (1997). In 2000, Lagercrantz published a biography of the inventor Håkan Lans, A Swedish Genius, which was later adapted as a documentary film, Patent 986. Lagercrantz's literary breakthrough was the 2009 novel Syndafall i Wilmslow (the Fall of Man in Wilmslow) about the English mathematician and cryptanalyst Alan Turing. Lagercrantz's first books had in common the theme of brilliant eccentrics at odds with their contemporaries.

=== I Am Zlatan Ibrahimović (2011) ===
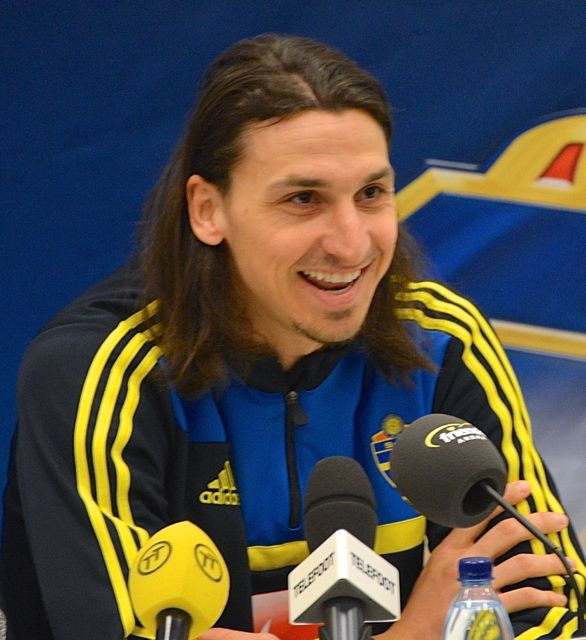
Zlatan Ibrahimović

In November 2011, David Lagercrantz's best-selling sports biography I Am Zlatan Ibrahimović was published. The Swedish-language edition sold over 500,000 copies in six weeks, making it the fastest-selling book of all time in Sweden. The biography has today been translated into more than 30 languages. I Am Zlatan Ibrahimovic received much attention, as it contributed to an increased readership amongst boys and young men. It was nominated for the August Prize in 2012 and the William Hill Sports Book of the Year in 2013. In the Financial Times, Simon Kuper called the biography "the best footballer's autobiography of recent years".

A film adaptation of the book premiered in Sweden in March 2022 and became the No. 1 Swedish movie in Swedish cinemas that year. David Lagercrantz wrote the screenplay along with Jakob Beckman. The film I Am Zlatan was nominated for the audience award at the 2023 Swedish Film Awards. It was also nominated in the best film, best director, best screenplay, best actor and best supporting actor categories at the 2023 Swedish Film Awards.

=== The Millennium Series ===
In 2013 it was announced that David Lagercrantz would write a fourth installment in Stieg Larsson's Millennium series. The announcement garnered considerable attention, both positive and negative. Stieg Larsson's partner, for example, criticized the project. In August 2015, The Girl in the Spider's Web was published simultaneously in 27 countries. It broke international sales records and topped bestseller lists across the world, including the New York Times bestseller list. Reviews were generally positive. Along with two subsequent Millennium installments also penned by Lagercrantz, The Girl in the Spider's Web has been published in more than 50 countries and is one of the greatest international commercial successes of Swedish literature to date.

In 2015, Lagercrantz published a diary about his work on The Girl in the Spider's Web, and in 2016 Swedish Public Broadcasting released a television documentary on the same topic.

The Girl in the Spider's Web was adapted by Sony Pictures as the first book in the Millennium series to be originally produced in English. The Girl in the Spider's Web film premiered in 2018. The film was directed by Fede Álvarez, who also wrote the screenplay along with Steven Knight and Jay Basu. Claire Foy, known from The Crown, played Lisbeth Salander while Sverrir Gudnason played Mikael Blomkvist.

The fifth installment in the Millennium series, The Girl Who Takes an Eye for an Eye, was published in 2017. Reviews were mostly favorable and the book was a New York Times bestseller. Lagercrantz's sixth and final installment, The Girl Who Lived Twice, was published in 2019. It was the bestselling book in both print and audio in Sweden that year.

=== The Rekke-Vargas Series ===
Obscuritas is the first of five planned installments in Lagercrantz's crime fiction series about Professor Hans Rekke, an international expert on interrogation technique, and Micaela Vargas, a young street cop from Husby. Obscuritas was published in 2021 and was well received by literary critics. Translation rights to the Rekke-Vargas Series have been sold to more than 30 countries.

Memoria (2023) is the second installment in Lagercrantz's new crime series about Professor Hans Rekke and Constable Micaela Vargas.

== Personal life ==
Since 2004, David Lagercrantz is married to Anne Lagercrantz (née Bergman, b. 1973). They have two children. Lagercrantz also has a daughter from a previous relationship.

== Social engagement ==
Lagercrantz is on the board of Swedish PEN, which campaigns for and supports oppressed and imprisoned writers across the world. Lagercrantz is also an advocate for children's and youth literature and reading habits. He is actively engaged in Läsrörelsen, of which he was elected honorary member in 2018, alongside authors like Astrid Lindgren and Lennart Hellsing.

Lagercrantz runs the literary agency Brave New World Agency alongside Jessica Bab.

Lagercrantz has made significant donations to organizations such as Läsrörelsen (which promotes children's and youth reading), Grävfonden (a foundation for training journalists in investigative reporting), and Swedish PEN.

Lagercrantz has hosted and appeared in numerous television and radio shows in Sweden. He gave a much-praised speech at the secular opening ceremony of Swedish parliament in 2022.

=== Awards ===
Shortlisted for The August Prize 2012 for I Am Zlatan Ibrahimovic

Short-listed to The William Hill Sport Book of the Year in 2013 for I Am Zlatan Ibrahimovic

Designated as one of the year's best thrillers in 2015 by the magazine Esquire for The Girl in the Spider's Web

Short-listed to the 2016 Petrona Award – Best Scandinavian Crime Novel of the Year for The Girl in the Spider's Web

Nominated for the 2023 Swedish Film Awards for the screenplay for I am Zlatan.

== Published works ==
- Göran Kropp 8000 plus (1997), biography of Göran Kropp
- Änglarna i Åmsele (1998), non-fiction, about the Åmsele triple murder case
- Ett svenskt geni (2000), biography of Håkan Lans
- Stjärnfall (2001), novel
- Där gräset aldrig växer mer (2002), novel
- Underbarnets gåta (2003), novel
- Himmel över Everest (2005), novel
- Ett svenskt geni – berättelsen om Håkan Lans och kriget han startade (second revised and expanded edition) (2006)
- Fall of Man in Wilmslow (2009), novel
- I am Zlatan Ibrahimović (Original title: Jag är Zlatan Ibrahimović, 2011).
- The Girl in the Spider's Web (2015), novel, part four in the Millennium series
- The Girl Who Takes an Eye for an Eye (2017), novel, part five in the Millennium series
- The Girl Who Lived Twice (August 2019), novel, part six in the Millennium series
- Dark Music: A Novel (2022)
