= Millennium (novel series) =

Crime novel series started by Stieg Larsson

MILLENNIUM TRILOGY
- First Swedish edition cover of The Girl with the Dragon Tattoo
- The Girl with the Dragon Tattoo (2005); The Girl Who Played with Fire (2006); The Girl Who Kicked the Hornets' Nest (2007); The Girl in the Spider's Web (2015); The Girl Who Takes an Eye for an Eye (2017); The Girl Who Lived Twice (2019); The Girl in the Eagle's Talons (2022); The Girl with Ice in her Veins (2024)
- Author: Stieg Larsson; David Lagercrantz; Karin Smirnoff
- Translator: Reg Keeland; George Goulding; Sarah Death
- Country: Sweden
- Language: Swedish
- Genre: Crime, Mystery fiction
- Publisher: Norstedts Förlag, Polaris
- Published: August 2005 – present
- Published in English: January 2008 – present
- Media type: Print (hardback and paperback); Audiobook; E-book
- No. of books: 8

Millennium is a series of crime novels originally conceptualized by Swedish author Stieg Larsson, who completed the first three books before his death. David Lagercrantz penned the next three, and Karin Smirnoff is in the midst of writing the third trilogy. The two primary characters in the saga are Lisbeth Salander, an asocial computer hacker with a photographic memory, and Mikael Blomkvist, an investigative journalist and publisher of Millennium magazine.

Eight books in the series have been published. Larsson planned for 10 installments, but completed only three before his sudden death in 2004. That first trilogy was published posthumously as The Girl with the Dragon Tattoo in 2005, The Girl Who Played with Fire in 2006, and The Girl Who Kicked the Hornets' Nest in 2007. Larsson's novels were originally printed in Swedish by Norstedts Förlag, with English translations by Steven T. Murray published a few years later, by Quercus in the United Kingdom and Alfred A. Knopf in the United States.

In 2013, Norstedts Förlag commissioned Swedish author David Lagercrantz to continue the Millennium series with Larsson's characters. George Goulding was the English translator. The Girl in the Spider's Web was published in 2015, followed by The Girl Who Takes an Eye for an Eye in 2017 and The Girl Who Lived Twice in 2019.

In November 2021, publishing house Polaris acquired the rights to the series from Larsson's estate and announced a new trilogy of books written by Swedish author Karin Smirnoff, with English translation by Sarah Death. The Girl in the Eagle's Talons was published in 2022. The Girl with Ice in Her Veins followed, in 2024.

The first three books have been translated by many publishers in over 50 countries; by March 2015, 80 million copies had been sold worldwide. With Lagercrantz's first two installments, the Millennium series had sold over 100 million copies worldwide by May 2019, making it one of the best-selling book series in history. The series has been adapted into Swedish and American films, as well as comics from Vertigo Comics and Dupuis.

== Production ==
=== Origins ===
After his death, many of Larsson's friends said the character of Lisbeth Salander was created out of an incident in which Larsson, then a teenager, witnessed three of his friends gang-raping an acquaintance of his named Lisbeth, and did nothing to stop it. Days later, wracked with guilt, he begged her forgiveness — which she refused. The incident, he said, haunted him for years afterward, and in part moved him to create a character with her name who was also a rape survivor. The veracity of this story has since been questioned, after a colleague from Expo magazine reported to Rolling Stone that Larsson had told him that he had heard the story secondhand and retold it as his own.

In the only interview he ever did about the series, Larsson stated that he based the character on what he imagined Pippi Longstocking might have been like as an adult. Another source of inspiration was Larsson's niece, Therese. A rebellious teenager, she often wore black clothing and makeup and told him several times that she wanted to get a tattoo of a dragon. The author often emailed Therese while writing the novels to ask her about her life and how she would react in certain situations.

Larsson's friend and colleague Kurdo Baksi believes the author was also influenced by two murders in 2001 and 2002: Melissa Nordell, a model killed by her boyfriend, and Fadime Şahindal, a Swedish-Kurdish woman killed by her father. Both women were killed at the hands of men or as victims of honor crime. To Larsson, there was no difference, and the "systemic violence" against women highly affected and inspired him to take action against these crimes through his writing. Eva Gabrielsson, Larsson's longtime partner, wrote that "the trilogy allowed Stieg to denounce everyone he loathed for their cowardice, their irresponsibility, and their opportunism: Couch potato activists, sunny-day warriors, fair-weather skippers who pick and choose their causes; false friends who used him to advance their own careers; unscrupulous company heads and shareholders who wrangle themselves huge bonuses... Seen in this light, Stieg couldn't have had any better therapy for what ailed his soul than writing his novels."

People who knew Larsson, such as Baksi and Anders Hellberg, a colleague of Larsson's in the 1970s and 1980s, were surprised that he wrote the novels. Hellberg went so far as to suspect that Larsson is not the sole author of the series, reasoning that Larsson was simply not a good enough writer. His partner Gabrielsson has been named as the most likely candidate, due to her chosen wording during at least one interview that seemed to imply co-authorship. She later claimed she had been misquoted. In 2011 Gabrielsson expressed anger at such accusations and clarified: "The actual writing, the craftsmanship, was Stieg's. But the content is a different matter. There are a lot of my thoughts, ideas and work in there." As an example, she said he used her unfinished book about architect Per Olof Hallman to research locations for the Millennium series, and that the two of them physically checked places together and discussed where the characters would live.

=== Original trilogy by Stieg Larsson ===
Having begun writing the first book in summer 2002, Larsson waited until he had finished the first two and most of the third before submitting them to Swedish publishers. Baksi suggested he might have written the first chapter in 1997, which is when Larsson told him he was writing a novel. While other publishers had turned the manuscripts down, Expo's publisher Robert Aschberg recommended them to Norstedts Förlag, whose editors accepted after reading the first two books in a single sitting. Norstedts commissioned Steven T. Murray to undertake the English translation. Larsson tried to get British publishers to accept his book, but was turned down until Christopher MacLehose bought the global English-language rights of the book for his MacLehose Press, an imprint of the London publisher Quercus. Both Gabrielsson and Murray have said that MacLehose "needlessly prettified" the English translation, this being the reason Murray requested he be credited under the pseudonym "Reg Keeland." MacLehose explained that the translations were commissioned by the Swedish company who adapted the books to film in order to aid an English-speaking screenwriter whom the producers were hoping to hire. For that reason they were done quickly and were not intended for publication. MacLehose said he polished and tightened them up a bit, as he would with any translation. The English releases changed the titles, even though Larsson specifically refused to allow the Swedish publisher to change the name of the first novel, and the size of Salander's dragon tattoo; from a large piece covering her entire back, to a small shoulder tattoo. Alfred A. Knopf bought the U.S. rights to the books after Larsson's death in 2004, and uses this same translation.

=== Follow-up trilogy by David Lagercrantz ===
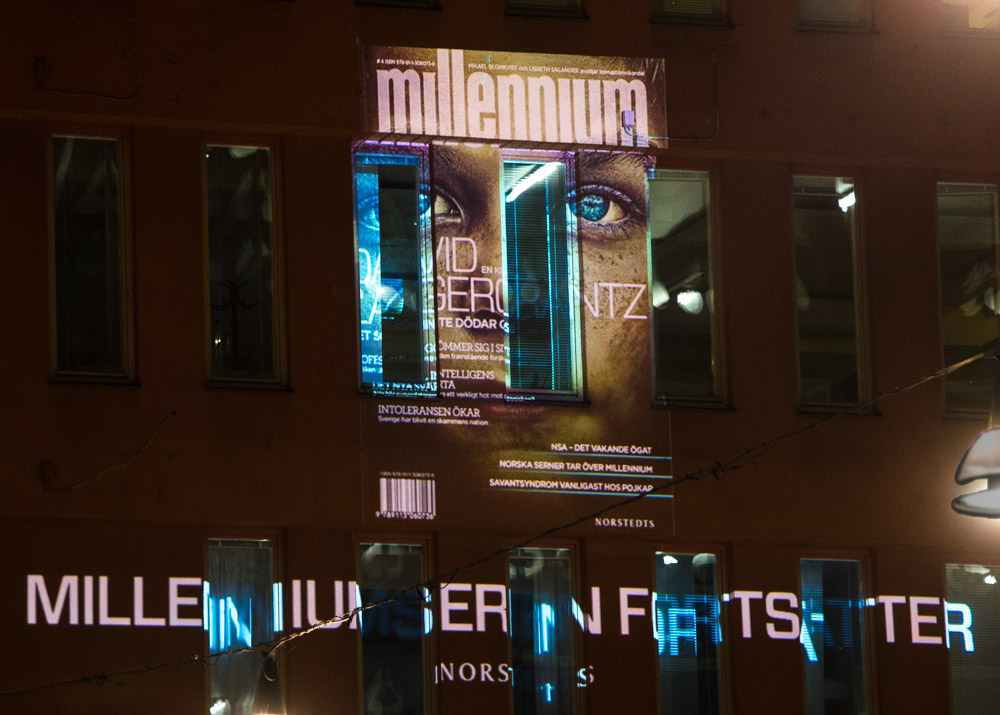
Advertisement for the release of The Girl in the Spider's Web in Stockholm, 2015

In December 2013, the Swedish publisher Norstedts announced that a fourth Millennium book, to be published in August 2015, would be written by David Lagercrantz, a Swedish author known for being Zlatan Ibrahimović's biographer. Gabrielsson has voiced criticism against this project, which has not made use of the unpublished material which is still in her possession. The Swedish title of the book is Det som inte dödar oss, literally translated "What Doesn't Kill Us". Like the previous novels, the English language translation was published by Quercus. The book was released with the English language title The Girl in the Spider's Web in the UK on 27 August and in the US on 1 September 2015.

The fifth book in the Millennium series was released in September 2017, once again written by Lagercrantz. The Swedish title is Mannen som sökte sin skugga (literal English translation: The Man Who Sought His Shadow) and the English title is The Girl Who Takes an Eye for an Eye. In 2017, Lagercrantz stated that he would only write one more installment in the Millennium series. Lagercrantz's The Girl Who Lived Twice was released on August 22, 2019.

=== Third trilogy by Karin Smirnoff ===
In November 2021, publishing house Polaris announced that they acquired the rights to the Millennium series from Larsson's estate and will release three new books in the series. Swedish author Karin Smirnoff was confirmed as the writer in December. Smirnoff said she accepted the offer without hesitation and stated "The Millennium books are classics in their genre, where the combination of unforgettable characters and the strong political and societal engagement still fascinates readers. I will continue to build on Stieg Larsson's core themes, such as violence, abuse of power, and contemporary political currents."

Smirnoff's first entry in the series, Havsörnens skrik (literal English translation 'The Sea Eagle's Cry'), was published on October 31, 2022. An English translation by Sarah Death titled The Girl in the Eagle's Talons was published on August 29, 2023.

Smirnoff's second book, Lokattens klor (literal English translation 'The Cat's Claws'), was published on September 29, 2024. An English translation titled The Girl with Ice in her Veins was published on September 2, 2025.

Smirnoff will write at least one more book for the series, with the title and release to be determined.

== Novels ==
=== Written by Stieg Larsson ===
Novels by Stieg Larsson
English title (original Swedish title)	Publication year	Description
The Girl with the Dragon Tattoo (Män som hatar kvinnor, "Men Who Hate Women")	2005	Journalist Mikael Blomkvist has been convicted of libelling billionaire industrialist Hans-Erik Wennerström and wants to escape the media attention. He is hired by industrial tycoon Henrik Vanger under the guise of writing a biography of Henrik and the Vanger family, while really investigating the 40-year-old disappearance of Henrik's niece Harriet. He teams up with the introverted and skilled computer hacker Lisbeth Salander.
The Girl Who Played with Fire (Flickan som lekte med elden, "The Girl Who Played with Fire")	2006	Mikael Blomkvist is contacted by freelance journalist Dag Svensson with regard to having ''Millennium'' publish his exposé on the sex trade in Sweden, which includes implicating government officials. Svensson and his girlfriend are murdered and the police believe Lisbeth Salander is the culprit. Blomkvist works to prove Salander's innocence while also trying to finish Svensson's piece and finds that both are connected.
The Girl Who Kicked the Hornets' Nest (Luftslottet som sprängdes, "The Castle in the Air That Was Blown Up")	2007	Having learned of a secret group within the Swedish Security Service that has committed several constitutional violations against Lisbeth Salander, Mikael Blomkvist and a group of policemen from Swedish Security Service's Constitutional Protection division try to learn who its members are and have Salander cleared of the murder charges against her.

=== Written by David Lagercrantz ===
Novels by David Lagercrantz
English title (original Swedish title)	Publication year	Description
The Girl in the Spider's Web (Det som inte dödar oss, "What Doesn't Kill Us")	2015	Journalist Mikael Blomkvist receives a phone call from a source claiming to have information vital to the United States. The source has been in contact with a young female superhacker—a hacker resembling someone Blomkvist knows all too well. The implications are staggering. Blomkvist, in desperate need of a scoop for Millennium, turns to Lisbeth Salander for help. She, as usual, has her own agenda. The secret they are both chasing is at the center of a tangled web of spies, cybercriminals, and governments around the world, and someone is prepared to kill to protect it.
The Girl Who Takes an Eye for an Eye (Mannen som sökte sin skugga, "The Man Who Sought His Shadow")	2017	Lisbeth Salander has never been able to uncover the most telling facts of her traumatic childhood, the secrets that might finally, fully explain her to herself. Now, when she sees a chance to uncover them once and for all, she enlists the help of Mikael Blomkvist, the editor of the muckraking investigative journal Millennium. And she will let nothing stop her — not the Islamists she enrages by rescuing a young woman from their brutality; not the prison gang leader who passes a death sentence on her; not the deadly reach of her long-lost twin sister, Camilla; and not the people who will do anything to keep buried knowledge of a sinister pseudoscientific experiment known only as The Registry.
The Girl Who Lived Twice (Hon som måste dö, "The Woman Who Must Die")	2019	Lisbeth Salander has left Stockholm, seemingly forever, and gone to Russia on a mission to finally hunt down, ruin, and kill her sister and nemesis Camilla. Meanwhile, Mikael Blomkvist, suffering from a slump due to a lack of interesting news stories, gets roped into a case involving a homeless man who may have been murdered and who had Blomkvist's phone number on him.

=== Written by Karin Smirnoff ===
Novels by Karin Smirnoff
English title (original Swedish title)	Publication year	Description
The Girl in the Eagle's Talons (Havsörnens skrik, "The Sea Eagle's Cry")	2022	Mikael Blomkvist boards a train to Älvsbyn to attend his daughter's wedding. Lisbeth Salander also travels north to mend a broken family bond. The two once again cross paths in the small town of Gasskas.
The Girl with Ice in her Veins (Lokattens klor, "The Cat's Claws")	2024	Once again located in Gasskas, the eighth Millennium story.

=== Larsson's unfinished material ===
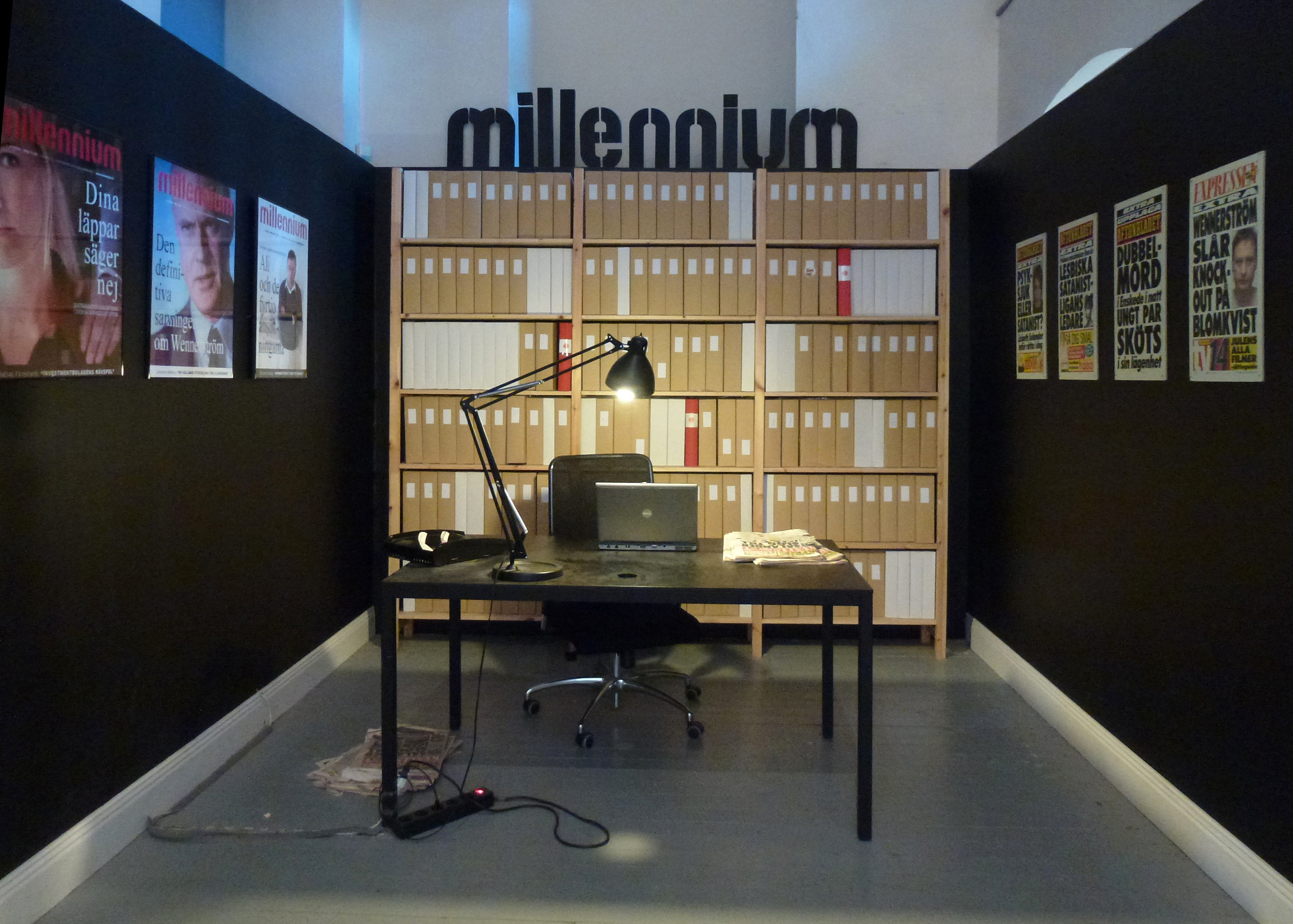
The Millennium Exhibition at the Stockholm City Museum

Larsson wrote an incomplete manuscript of another novel in the series before his sudden death in November 2004. His partner, Eva Gabrielsson, is in possession of the notebook computer with the manuscript, but does not own the rights to Larsson's work. In an attempt to protect Gabrielsson from the people he was investigating in real life, Larsson never married. He wrote a will, but it was not witnessed, making it invalid according to Swedish law. Thus, it is his family who have succession. Outlines or manuscripts for a fifth and sixth book also possibly exist.

In 2010, Larsson's friend John-Henri Holmberg showed Associated Press emails he received from the author shortly before his death that supposedly described plans for another book in the series. In them Larsson wrote, "The plot is set 120 kilometers north of Sachs Harbour, at Banks Island in the month of September ... According to the synopsis it should be 440 pages."

Gabrielsson has described the manuscript in her possession as roughly 200 pages, having a working title of Guds hämnd (God's Revenge), being 30% complete and "Not worth publishing as is." In 2011 Gabrielsson said, "I once offered to finish it, but I have to have the legal rights to do so, and they didn't want to give me that, so I think we should all be happy that there are just three." Only months earlier, Larsson's former colleague Kurdo Baksi said he and the author's father were shown the manuscript by Gabrielsson shortly after Larsson's death and that "It is at 260 pages at the moment – about 70% complete." He described the manuscript as being the fifth in the series, set "between Ireland, Sweden and the US" and largely featuring Lisbeth Salander's twin sister Camilla. Baksi is also against having a ghost writer complete it, believing that they "would not respect Stieg Larsson's style."

== Reception ==
The first novel won Sweden's Glass Key award in 2006, that same year the second book won the Best Swedish Crime Novel Award, and in 2008 the third novel also won the Glass Key award. In the 2012 revised edition of Japan's Tozai Mystery Best 100, the Millennium series was ranked the twelfth best mystery from the West. By May 2010, 27 million copies of the trilogy had been sold worldwide, a number that would grow to more than 46 million over the next five months, and reach 65 million in December 2011. In July 2010 the series made Larsson the first author to sell a million electronic copies of his work on the Amazon Kindle. Sales reached 75 million copies throughout fifty countries by December 2013, and 80 million by March 2015. Lagercrantz's first two installments had sold 14 million copies in 47 countries by May 2019, increasing the Millennium series' total to over 100 million copies worldwide.

== Adaptations ==
=== Swedish films ===
- The Girl with the Dragon Tattoo, released on February 25, 2009.
- The Girl Who Played with Fire, released on September 18, 2009.
- The Girl Who Kicked the Hornets' Nest, released on November 27, 2009.

The Swedish film production company Yellow Bird has produced film versions of the Millennium Trilogy, co-produced with The Danish film production company Nordisk Film and television company, which were released in Scandinavia in 2009. In 2010, the extending of all three films to approximately 180 minutes led to their being shown on Swedish television as the six-part Millennium series. Each film was divided into two parts of 90 minutes. This version was released on July 14, 2010, on DVD and Blu-ray Disc in three separate sets and on November 24, 2010, as a Complete Millennium Trilogy box set with an extra disc.

Originally, only the first film was meant for a theatrical release, with the following ones conceived as TV films, but this was changed in the wake of the tremendous success of the first film. The first film was directed by Niels Arden Oplev and the next two by Daniel Alfredson, while the screenplays of the first two were adapted by Nikolaj Arcel and Rasmus Heisterberg, and the last one by Ulf Rydberg and Jonas Frykberg. All three films feature Michael Nyqvist as Mikael Blomkvist and Noomi Rapace as Lisbeth Salander.

=== American films ===
- The Girl with the Dragon Tattoo. Released in North America on December 21, 2011, and in the United Kingdom on December 26, 2011.
- The Girl in the Spider's Web. Released in Sweden on October 26, 2018, and in the United States on November 9, 2018.

Yellow Bird and Metro-Goldwyn-Mayer partnered with Columbia Pictures to produce an English-language adaptation of the first novel. The Girl with the Dragon Tattoo was written by Steven Zaillian, directed by David Fincher and produced by Scott Rudin, with Daniel Craig as Mikael Blomkvist and Rooney Mara as Lisbeth Salander. Along with Dragon Tattoo, Fincher and Zaillian signed a two-picture deal to adapt The Girl Who Played with Fire, and The Girl Who Kicked the Hornets' Nest, which would possibly have been shot back to back. In January 2012, it was announced that Sony was "moving forward" with the adaptations of The Girl Who Played with Fire and The Girl Who Kicked the Hornet's Nest. Zaillian wrote the original screenplays, but Sony brought in Andrew Kevin Walker to revise them. The studio had hoped to have the same people involved in the sequels as in the first film, with Fincher directing and Daniel Craig and Rooney Mara starring, but scheduling has been difficult.

On 4 November 2015, it was announced that an adaptation of The Girl in the Spider's Web was in the works and that Craig and Mara would not be reprising their roles. The film is a quasi-reboot featuring a different cast, but still framed as a sequel to Fincher's film. It is directed by Fede Álvarez, and stars Claire Foy as Salander and Sverrir Gudnason as Blomkvist.

=== Comics ===
In October 2011, DC Comics announced that its Vertigo imprint had acquired the rights to the series, and would be adapting each novel into two graphic novels. The adaptations were written by Scottish crime novelist Denise Mina, with art by Leonardo Manco and Andrea Mutti.

- The Girl with the Dragon Tattoo, Book 1, released on November 13, 2012.
- The Girl with the Dragon Tattoo, Book 2, released on May 7, 2013.
- The Girl Who Played with Fire, released on June 3, 2014.
- The Girl Who Kicked the Hornet's Nest, released on July 28, 2015.

For the Franco-Belgian market, a separate adaptation has been published, written by Sylvain Runberg with artwork by José Homs and Manolo Carot. Starting in 2016, Runberg followed up the series with newer stories based on the characters, Millénium Saga, drawn by Belén Ortega, independent of David Lagercrantz' sequels.

In 2017, Titan Comics began publishing English translations of the Runberg/Homs adaptations under their Hard Case Crime imprint.

== Legacy ==
The Stockholm City Museum hosts a two hour long tour of the city with popular spots that Larsson visited and other spots named as being visited by his characters Lisbeth Salander and Mikael Blomkvist.
