= The Girl in the Spider's Web =

2015 novel by David Lagercrantz

- First edition cover
- Author: David Lagercrantz
- Original title: Det som inte dödar oss
- Translator: George Goulding
- Language: Swedish
- Series: Millennium
- Genre: Crime, mystery, thriller
- Publisher: Norstedts Förlag (Sweden), Quercus (United Kingdom), Alfred A. Knopf (United States)
- Publication date: 27 August 2015
- Publication place: Sweden
- English publication date: 27 August 2015 (UK), 1 September 2015 (US)
- Media type: Print
- Pages: 544
- ISBN: 978-0-85705-999-4 (English)
- Preceded by: The Girl Who Kicked the Hornets' Nest
- Followed by: The Girl Who Takes an Eye for an Eye

The Girl in the Spider's Web (original title in Swedish: Det som inte dödar oss, lit. 'What Doesn't Kill Us') is the fourth novel in the Millennium series. It focuses on the characters Lisbeth Salander and Mikael Blomkvist. Written by David Lagercrantz, it is the first novel in the series not authored by the series' creator and author of the first three Millennium books, Stieg Larsson, who died of a heart attack in 2004. The novel was released worldwide on 27 August 2015, except in the United States, where it was released on 1 September 2015.

== Development ==
In December 2013, the Swedish publisher of the Millennium series, Norstedts Förlag, announced plans for a fourth Millennium book, written by David Lagercrantz, to be published in August 2015. Extreme caution was taken to make sure details did not leak, and no early review copies were given out. Lagercrantz wrote the book on a computer that had no internet connection, and he personally handed his manuscripts to his publisher. Lagercrantz reported the draft finished in January 2015. Its Swedish title, Det som inte dödar oss, literally translated, means "That Which Does Not Kill Us".

Lagercrantz was given free rein by Larsson's estate. He tried to stay true to the series' complex stories with different plotlines but did not attempt to imitate Larsson's "journalistic authoritativeness."

The novel was translated into 38 different languages, including an English translation by George Goulding. Like the previous novels, the English language translation is published by Quercus in the UK. In March 2015, the US publisher Alfred A. Knopf announced the English-language title of the book, The Girl in the Spider's Web, and released their cover art. The first printing in the United States was for 500,000 copies.

The late author's literary estate is fully controlled by Larsson's brother and father, who hired Lagercrantz and have supported the latest book in the series.

However, Larsson's long-term domestic partner, Eva Gabrielsson, has voiced criticism against this project and referred to Lagercrantz as a "completely idiotic choice" to continue the Millennium series. She possesses an unfinished fourth manuscript of the Millennium series, which is not included in the novel.

In an interview, Lagercrantz said that he had one criticism against Stieg Larsson and Larsson's portrait of the protagonist Mikael Blomkvist: "Women came to [Mikael Blomkvist], fell down and wanted to sleep with him, he didn't even have to charm them. I tried to tone this down as I couldn't understand it."

When asked about the decision to continue the series after Larsson's death, Sonny Mehta, the president of Alfred A. Knopf — the American publisher of all the Millennium books — said, "Lisbeth Salander is one of the heroines, I think, of the 21st century, and a most unlikely heroine. She's brave, she's intrepid, she's unfrightenable, she's got a moral core (...) And I hope people will just welcome the return of this extremely unlikely pair of Salander and this crusading journalist."

== Plot ==
Computer scientist Frans Balder abandons a prestigious job in Silicon Valley and returns to Sweden to take custody of his autistic son August. Balder is informed by several law enforcement agencies that he is in danger of a criminal organization who call themselves the "Spider Society", but he ignores their warnings, preferring to focus on his neglected son. August exhibits savant syndrome; he produces drawings of impressive veracity and demonstrates facility with numbers. Meanwhile, one year since Millennium magazine's scoop on The Section, the publication has stagnated and is in danger of losing creative control to outside investors. Balder's former associate, Linus Brandell, tells Mikael Blomkvist about Balder and his tumultuous history, mentioning that some of his activities were aided by Lisbeth Salander.

Spurred by a childhood memory, Salander attempts to track down someone from her past, leading her to the Spider Society. She helps a group of hackers gain access into NSA servers, much to the fury of the agency's top cyber security agent, Edwin Needham. NSA agent Alona Casales and SÄPO agent Gabriella Grane are given the task of pursuing Salander and the Spider Society, which are a group of elite Russian criminals led by an individual named "Thanos". Grane calls Balder with concerns about his safety, and Balder hires Milton Security for protection. He also reaches out to Blomkvist, hoping to confess his concerns to a respected journalist. Blomkvist agrees to meet him, but as he arrives, an assassin, self-identified in the narration as Jan Holtser, kills Balder. Blomkvist reaches out to Salander, hoping to harness her talents for the investigation.

August's mother is unable to cope with his disorder and remands him to a care facility. However, Blomkvist realizes that August is drawing a picture of his father's killer. Holtser's superior, a woman called Kira, orders him to eliminate the child, but Salander rescues August and reaches out to Blomkvist and Millennium editor Erika Berger. Grane, a friend of Berger's, offers her a beachfront vacation property as a safe house. Blomkvist learns from Balder's former associates that he had hired Salander to confirm that someone had robbed him, implicating executives inside Solifon, the company he worked for, in the theft. Thus, Balder went to Solifon to attempt to gain more evidence, discovering that they were collaborating with both the NSA and the Spider Society in their espionage efforts. It was this investigation that resulted in his death.

Needham is pulled off the investigation into Salander's hack, as the NSA is eager to cover up the agency's involvement. He learns of an individual known as "Wasp", and catches the allusions to Marvel Comics characters Janet Van Dyne, the founding member of the Avengers, and their perennial foe. Meanwhile, a woman calling herself Rebecka Mattson attempts to seduce Blomkvist. After talking to Salander's former guardian, Holger Palmgren, he learns she is Lisbeth's long-missing twin sister Camilla, who has taken over part of her father Zalachenko's criminal network and is using it to strike against Lisbeth. Needham comes to Sweden and contacts Blomkvist, asking to meet Salander so that she can help him secure the NSA database. However, they are interrupted by Salander: she and August are under attack at the safe house by the Spider Society by the orders of Camilla AKA Kira AKA Thanos. Lisbeth fends them off, wounding Holtser and several other suspects.

Though Camilla gets away, Lisbeth and August do as well; additionally, August has already drawn the picture implicating Holtser and helping Salander decrypt the last of the NSA's secrets. Grane takes a position at the UN working for human rights. Millennium publishes an exposė of the affair which restores their credibility; additionally, a new investment from Gibraltar (the site of Salander's Wasp Enterprises) allows Millennium to buy out their meddlesome investors. Needham, with the magazine as ammunition, ousts the crooked officers at the NSA. Salander visits Blomkvist to renew their friendship.

== Reception ==
An early review by Upsala Nya Tidning characterised The Girl in the Spider's Web as "standard crime", portraying more brooding, human versions of Blomkvist and Salander, while downplaying the earlier "exaggerated and cartoonish features of the series".

The book topped the U.S. bestseller list in August 2015.

== Film adaptation ==
In November 2015, Columbia Pictures announced a film adaptation written by Steven Knight was in development. In November 2016, Variety reported that Fede Álvarez would direct the film, a sequel to The Girl with the Dragon Tattoo. Unlike the previous books and film versions, The Girl in the Spider's Web is the first in the best-selling series to be produced into an English-language film in its initial adaptation. Knight wrote the screenplay with Alvarez and Jay Basu.

In March 2017, it was confirmed that the film would have an entirely new cast and was scheduled to be released on 5 October 2018. In May 2017, Variety reported that Claire Foy is the top pick for the main role. Scott Rudin, Søren Stærmose, Ole Søndberg, Amy Pascal, Elizabeth Cantillon, Eli Bush, and Berna Levin produced the film, which is executive produced by Anni Faurbye Fernandez, Line Winther Skyum Funch, Johannes Jensen, and The Girl with the Dragon Tattoo director David Fincher.
