= Millennium (miniseries) =

Swedish television miniseries

- Also known as: Millenniumtriologin
- Genre: Thriller
- Based on: Millennium by Stieg Larsson
- Written by: Rasmus Heisterberg; Nikolaj Arcel; Jonas Frykberg; Ulf Rydberg
- Directed by: Niels Arden Oplev; Daniel Alfredson
- Starring: Michael Nyqvist; Noomi Rapace; Lena Endre; Michalis Koutsogiannakis; Jacob Ericksson
- Country of origin: Sweden
- Original language: Swedish
- No. of episodes: 6

Production
- Running time: 90 min
- Production companies: Yellow Bird; SVT; Nordisk Film; Film i Väst; ZDF Enterprises

Original release
- Network: SVT1
- Release: 20 March – 24 April 2010

Millennium is a 2010 Swedish six-part television miniseries expanded from the 2009 film adaptations of Stieg Larsson's Millennium book series: The Girl with the Dragon Tattoo, The Girl Who Played with Fire, and The Girl Who Kicked the Hornets' Nest.

The miniseries was produced by Yellow Bird in cooperation with several production companies. It was broadcast on SVT1 from 20 March 2010 to 24 April 2010, and released in 2011 in DVD and Blu-ray in the US under the name Dragon Tattoo Trilogy: Extended Edition. Millennium was well received, winning a jury award for drama at Kristallen 2010, and an International Emmy Award for Best TV Movie or Miniseries in 2011.

== Production ==
The Millennium TV miniseries is a compilation of the three Swedish film adaptations, The Girl with the Dragon Tattoo, The Girl Who Played with Fire, and The Girl Who Kicked the Hornets' Nest with extended scenes, adding more depth in both the stories and the characters. It was divided into 6 episodes total, with each episode of the series about 90 minutes long, making the television series about 110 minutes longer than the movies. The series was produced by Yellow Bird in cooperation with several production companies, including SVT, Nordisk Film, Film i Väst and ZDF Enterprises. It was broadcast on SVT1 from 20 March 2010 to 24 April 2010 and released on a DVD and Blu-ray boxset titled Millennium Trilogy on 11 November 2011. Music Box Home Entertainment released the English version in US on 6 December 2011 under the name Dragon Tattoo Trilogy: Extended Edition.

No.	Title	Directed by	Written by	Original release date
1	The Girl with the Dragon Tattoo	Niels Arden Oplev	Rasmus Heisterberg and Nikolaj Arcel	20 March 2010
2	The Girl with the Dragon Tattoo	Niels Arden Oplev	Rasmus Heisterberg and Nikolaj Arcel	27 March 2010
3	The Girl Who Played with Fire	Daniel Alfredson	Jonas Frykberg	3 April 2010
4	The Girl Who Played with Fire	Daniel Alfredson	Jonas Frykberg	10 April 2010
5	The Girl Who Kicked the Hornets' Nest	Daniel Alfredson	Ulf Rydberg	17 April 2010
6	The Girl Who Kicked the Hornets' Nest	Daniel Alfredson	Ulf Rydberg	24 April 2010

== Cast ==
This is a list of characters who appeared in the series.

Character	Actor/Actress	Episodes					
Character	Actor/Actress	Part 1	Part 2	Part 3	Part 4	Part 5	Part 6
Mikael Blomkvist	Michael Nyqvist	Yes	Yes	Yes	Yes	Yes	Yes
Lisbeth Salander	Noomi Rapace	Yes	Yes	Yes	Yes	Yes	Yes
Erika Berger	Lena Endre	Yes	Yes	Yes	Yes	Yes	Yes
Dragan Armanskij	Michalis Koutsogiannakis	Yes		Yes		Yes	Yes
Christer Malm	Jacob Ericksson	Yes		Yes	Yes	Yes	Yes
"Plague"	Tomas Köhler	Yes		Yes		Yes	Yes
Malin Eriksson	Sofia Ledarp	Yes	Yes	Yes	Yes	Yes	Yes
Annika Giannini	Annika Hallin	Yes		Yes		Yes	Yes
Alexander Zalachenko	Georgi Staykov			Yes	Yes	Yes	
Miriam Wu	Yasmine Garbi	Yes		Yes	Yes		
Ronald Niedermann	Mikael Spreitz			Yes	Yes	Yes	Yes
Nils Bjurman	Peter Andersson	Yes	Yes	Yes	Yes	Yes	
Holger Palmgren	Per Oscarsson	Yes		Yes	Yes		Yes
Henrik Vanger	Sven-Bertil Taube	Yes	Yes				
Cecilia Vanger	Marika Lagercrantz	Yes	Yes				
Martin Vanger	Peter Haber	Yes	Yes				
Dirch Frode	Ingvar Hirdwall	Yes	Yes				
Janne Dahlman	David Dencik	Yes	Yes				
Gustaf Morell	Björn Granath	Yes	Yes				
Harriet Vanger	Ewa Fröling	Yes	Yes				
Brännlund	Fredrik Ohlsson	Yes	Yes				
Harald Vanger	Gösta Bredefeldt	Yes	Yes				
Isabella Vanger	Gunnel Lindblom	Yes	Yes				
Birger Vanger	Willie Andréason	Yes	Yes				
Otto Falk	Christian Fiedler	Yes	Yes				
Birgit Falk	Margareta Stone	Yes	Yes				
Enrico	Reuben Sallmander	Yes		Yes			
Paolo Roberto	Paolo Roberto			Yes	Yes		
Jan Bublanski	Johan Kylén			Yes	Yes	Yes	Yes
Gunnar Björk	Ralph Carlsson			Yes	Yes	Yes	
Sonja Modig	Tanja Lorentzon			Yes	Yes	Yes	Yes
Rikard Ekström	Niklas Hjulström			Yes	Yes	Yes	Yes
Hans Faste	Magnus Krepper			Yes	Yes	Yes	Yes
Niklas Eriksson	Daniel Gustavsson			Yes	Yes		
Jerker Holmberg	Donald Högberg			Yes	Yes	Yes	Yes
Dr. Peter Teleborian	Anders Ahlbom Rosendahl			Yes		Yes	Yes
Evert Gullberg	Hans Alfredson					Yes	Yes
Fredrik Clinton	Lennart Hjulström					Yes	Yes
Torsten Edklinth	Niklas Falk					Yes	Yes
Monica Figuerola	Mirja Turestedt					Yes	Yes
Hallberg	Jan Holmquist					Yes	Yes
Georg Nyström	Rolf Degerlund					Yes	Yes
Birger Wadensjöö	Jacob Nordenson					Yes	Yes
Dr. Anders Jonasson	Aksel Morisse					Yes	Yes
Jonas Sandström	Johan Holmberg					Yes	Yes
Judge	Ylva Lööf					Yes	Yes
Sonny Nieminen	Pelle Blomander			Yes	Yes	Yes	Yes
Hans-Åke Waltari	Nicklas Gustavsson					Yes	Yes
Watchman	Jim Wiberg					Yes	Yes

== Reception ==
Millennium won the award for "Årets TV-drama" ("TV Drama of the Year") at Kristallen 2010. The series also won the award for "Best TV Movie or Miniseries" at the 39th International Emmy Awards. Paul Pritchard of DVD Verdict praised the choice for reconfiguring the three films into an extended miniseries stating, "This change of format not only doesn't harm the material, it actually enhances it. Given the extra room to breathe, the films are both richer and a much more palatable proposition. Whether by chance or design, each of the films also has a natural break-off point, where each episode can draw to a close; this allows the viewer to take in each story in easily digestible chunks whilst ensuring they are left desperate to find out what happens next. It's also important to stress that the story still maintains its cinematic feel." Thomas Spurlin of DVD Talk gave similar praise stating, "The Swedish film trilogy captures the character examination portion of the equation quite well; combining Noomi Rapace with generally well-adapted text (aside from a few character divergences and rewrites) renders a compelling cinematic exploration of the character, one similar in tone and impact to that in Larsson's text. The films aren't perfect in terms of their effectiveness as procedural thrillers or dramatic powerhouses, but the elements that they do get right elevate the content to something noteworthy."

== See also ==
- Stieg Larsson
- Millennium series
