= Mikael Blomkvist =

Character in novels by Stieg Larsson

- Millennium character
- Mikael Blomkvist, as portrayed by Michael Nyqvist
- First appearance: The Girl with the Dragon Tattoo
- Last appearance: The Girl Who Takes an Eye for an Eye
- Created by: Stieg Larsson
- Portrayed by: Michael Nyqvist (Swedish); Daniel Craig (English, 2011); Sverrir Gudnason (English, 2018)

In-universe information
- Nickname: Kalle Blomkvist
- Gender: Male
- Occupation: Journalist
- Family: Kurt Blomkvist (father; deceased); Anita Blomkvist (mother; deceased); Annika Giannini (sister); Enrico Giannini (brother-in-law); Monica Abrahamson (ex-wife); Pernilla Blomkvist (daughter); Lucas (grandson); Henry Salo (son-in-law)
- Nationality: Swedish

Mikael Blomkvist is a fictional character created by Swedish author and journalist Stieg Larsson. He is a main character of Larsson's award-winning Millennium series, along with Lisbeth Salander.

== Profile ==
=== Name ===
Larsson stated in interviews that he based many characters, including that of Lisbeth Salander, on characters from Astrid Lindgren novels. Blomkvist is frequently referred to by his colleagues in the news media as "Kalle Blomkvist", a reference to a boy detective who appears in several of Lindgren's novels, because his first notable investigation is uncovering the hideout of a gang of bank robbers. Lisbeth Salander sarcastically refers to him by this nickname throughout the series.

=== Overview ===
"Mikael Blomkvist is a graduate of the School of Journalism and had much of his professional life dedicated to revealing and report suspicious transactions, specifically in the field of banking and business," writes Larsson in the first volume of the trilogy. "It will give the typical image of guardian of the moral, incorruptible, facing the business world. And as such quite frequently invite you to comment on various issues in television."

=== Character biography ===
Blomkvist is an investigative journalist and co-owner of the monthly magazine Millennium based in Stockholm, Sweden. At the start of The Girl with the Dragon Tattoo, he loses a libel case involving damaging allegations about billionaire industrialist Hans-Erik Wennerström, and is sentenced to three months in prison. Facing jail time and professional disgrace, Blomkvist steps down from his position on the magazine's board of directors. At the same time, he is offered a freelance assignment by Henrik Vanger, the former CEO of Vanger Enterprises and patriarch of the wealthy Vanger family, to help him solve the cold case of his great-niece, Harriet Vanger, who has been missing for 36 years and presumed dead. Blomkvist reluctantly accepts the case in exchange for valuable information Vanger claims to have that would help him in his case against Wennerström.

During this time, Blomkvist meets and begins to work with computer hacker Lisbeth Salander, whom Vanger had hired prior to investigate Blomkvist while considering him for the job. The two form an important relationship, in which each of their skill-sets prove invaluable in solving the Vanger case; they also become lovers. At the end of the first novel, Salander saves Blomkvist from Vanger's great-nephew (and Harriet's brother) Martin, a serial killer who has been murdering women throughout Sweden for decades. Using her phone tapping contacts in London, she and Blomkvist discover that Harriet Vanger is alive and living in Australia. When Vanger's information about Wennerström proves to be useless, Salander uses her computer hacking skills to get sensitive information about Wennerström that is much more incriminating than what Blomkvist had in the past. With the information uncovered by Salander, Blomkvist publishes an exposé article and book that ruins Wennerström, clears his own name, and propels his magazine to one of the most respected and profitable in Sweden. Salander abruptly ends their relationship at the end of the novel, however, after seeing him with his lover and business partner, Erika Berger.

In the following novel, The Girl Who Played with Fire, two of Blomkvist's colleagues and Salander's former legal guardian Nils Bjurman are murdered and Salander is identified as the prime suspect. Blomkvist becomes her only supporter and strives to clear her name, even as she wants nothing to do with him and refuses to help him in any way. He eventually discovers that the murders are part of an elaborate conspiracy between The Section—a faction of SÄPO, the Swedish Secret Service—and Salander's father, former Soviet spy Alexander Zalachenko, whom The Section had illegally helped to defect. He also learns that Bjurman had raped Salander a few years earlier, and that The Section conspired to have her committed to a mental hospital as a child in order to protect Zalachenko. He follows Salander to Zalachenko's farm, where he finds her near death after a confrontation with her father. He calls an ambulance, saving her life.

In the final novel of the original Millennium trilogy, The Girl Who Kicked the Hornets' Nest, Blomkvist risks his life researching the full extent of SÄPO's crimes, and persuades his sister Annika, a lawyer, to represent Salander, who has been cleared of the original murder suspicions, but is now charged with attempted murder and two cases of grievous bodily harm, as well as several other offences including possession of illegal weapons. With help from government prosecutors and Salander's fellow hackers, Blomkvist finds proof of the conspiracy and publishes an exposé article on the case, which results in several SÄPO agents being arrested. Using this information, Annika clears Salander's name. Blomkvist shows up at Salander's flat that night, and they reconcile as friends.

In the 2015 novel The Girl in the Spider's Web, written by David Lagercrantz as a continuation of the original series, Blomkvist again appears as one of the main protagonists. In the novel, Millennium's parent company, Serner Group, is trying to push Blomkvist out as editor. Desperate for a story, Blomkvist agrees to interview scientist Frans Balder about the theft of his quantum computer technology by hackers. When Balder is murdered, Blomkvist learns that he had hired Salander to hack his company, Solifon, to find out the thieves' identities. She had found out that a criminal organization called "The Spider Society" stole the data with help from Solifon employees and a mole in the National Security Agency. Salander enlists his help in protecting Balder's autistic son, August, from assassins working for the Spider Society, who had also murdered Balder.

Blomkvist meets Salander's sister, Camilla, and learns from Salander's former guardian, Holger Palmgren, that she is the leader of the Spider Society. When Camilla kills one of his reporters, Andrei Zander, Blomkvist—using information supplied by Salander—writes an article exposing Camilla's complicity with Solifon and the NSA in Balder's murder. The article nets Millennium enough money to buy out Serner, and re-establishes Blomkvist as one of Sweden's most respected journalists. The night the article is published, Blomkvist and Salander meet at his apartment.

=== Relationships ===
Blomkvist is divorced with one daughter – Pernilla – and throughout the trilogy has several lovers, including a brief affair with Lisbeth Salander. However, his primary partner throughout his adult life is Erika Berger, also his business partner. They enjoy an on-off sexual relationship which began years earlier before each were married. Berger is still married and her husband knows about and accepts their open relationship. Towards the end of the first novel, Salander, after realising that she has fallen in love with him, and believing it to be one-sided, abruptly cuts off all contact with him. Blomkvist also has sexual relationships with three other characters in the series: Cecilia Vanger, Harriet Vanger and Monica Figuerola.

== In film ==
In the 2009 Swedish version of The Girl with the Dragon Tattoo and its two sequels, Blomkvist is played by Michael Nyqvist. In the 2011 English adaptation, Blomkvist is played by Daniel Craig. In The Girl in the Spider's Web, he is portrayed by Sverrir Gudnason.
