= Lisbeth Salander =

Fictional character created by Stieg Larsson

- Millennium character
- Lisbeth Salander, as portrayed by Noomi Rapace in the Swedish films
- First appearance: The Girl with the Dragon Tattoo (2005)
- Last appearance: The Girl with Ice in her Veins (2024)
- Created by: Stieg Larsson
- Portrayed by: Noomi Rapace (Swedish); Tehilla Blad (Swedish, young); Rooney Mara (English, 2011); Claire Foy (English, 2018); Beau Gadsdon (English, 2018, young)

In-universe information
- Aliases: Wasp, Irene Nesser, Monica Sholes
- Gender: Female
- Occupation: Computer hacker in the Hacker Republic; Private investigator at Milton Security
- Family: Alexander Zalachenko (father; deceased); Agneta Sofia Salander (mother; deceased); Camilla Salander (twin sister; deceased); Ronald Niedermann (half-brother; deceased); Svala Hirak (niece - Niedermann's daughter); Four unnamed half-brothers; Three unnamed half-sisters
- Nationality: Swedish with Russian ancestry

Lisbeth Salander is a fictional character created by Swedish author and journalist Stieg Larsson in his award-winning Millennium series. She first appeared in the 2005 novel The Girl with the Dragon Tattoo, as an antisocial computer hacker with a photographic memory who teams up with Mikael Blomkvist, an investigative journalist and publisher of a magazine called Millennium. Salander reappears in The Girl Who Played with Fire (2006) and The Girl Who Kicked the Hornets' Nest (2007), sequels that Larsson had written before he died in 2004.

The character has been positively received, with David Denby writing that Lisbeth Salander clearly accounts for a large part of the Millennium series' success. In the various film adaptations of the novels, actresses Noomi Rapace, Rooney Mara, and Claire Foy have all received praise for their portrayals of the character. In 2013, publisher Norstedts Förlag commissioned David Lagercrantz to continue the Millennium series with The Girl in the Spider's Web (2015), The Girl Who Takes an Eye for an Eye (2017), and The Girl Who Lived Twice (2019).

== Creation ==
In the only interview he ever did about the series, Larsson stated that he based the character of Lisbeth Salander on what he imagined Pippi Longstocking might have been like as an adult. In the Millennium series, Salander has the name "V. Kulla" displayed on the door of her apartment on the top floor of Fiskargatan 9 in Stockholm. "V. Kulla" is an abbreviation of "Villa Villekulla", the name of Pippi Longstocking's house.

Another source of inspiration was Larsson's niece, Therese. A rebellious teenager, she often wore black clothing and makeup, and told Larsson several times that she wanted to get a tattoo of a dragon. The author often emailed Therese while writing the novels to ask her about her life and how she would react in certain situations. She told him about her battle with anorexia and that she practiced kickboxing (previously jujitsu).

After his death, many of Larsson's friends said the character was inspired by an incident in which Larsson, then a teenager, witnessed three of his friends gang-raping an acquaintance of his named Lisbeth, and he did nothing to stop it. Days later, wracked with guilt, he begged her forgiveness, which she refused to grant. The incident, he said, haunted him for years afterward, and in part moved him to create a character with her name who was also a rape survivor. The veracity of this story has since been questioned, after a colleague from Expo magazine reported to Rolling Stone that Larsson had told him he had heard the story secondhand and retold it as his own.

== Character profile ==
Lisbeth Salander has red hair which she dyes raven black. Upon her first appearance in the series, she is described as "a pale, androgynous young woman who has hair as short as a fuse, and a pierced nose and eyebrows".

She has a tattoo of a wasp, about 2 centimetres (3/4 in) long, on her neck, a tattooed loop around the bicep of her left arm, another loop around her left ankle, a Chinese symbol on her hip, and a rose on her left calf. She has a large tattoo of a dragon on her back that runs from her shoulder, down her spine, and ends on her buttocks. This was changed in the English translation to a small dragon on her left shoulder blade. Salander visits a clinic in Genoa between the first and second books, where she had her wasp tattoo removed as she felt it was "too conspicuous and it made her too easy to remember and identify". She also has a breast enlargement, having previously "been flat-chested, as if she had never reached puberty. She thought [her breasts] had looked ridiculous, and she was always uncomfortable showing herself naked".

Salander is a world-class computer hacker. Under the pseudonym "Wasp", she becomes a prominent figure in the international hacker community known as the Hacker Republic (similar to the group Anonymous). She uses her computer skills as a means to earn a living, doing investigative work for Milton Security. She has an eidetic memory and is skillful at concealing her identity; she possesses passports in different names and disguises herself to travel undetected around Sweden and worldwide.

Salander has a complicated relationship with investigative journalist Mikael Blomkvist, which veers back and forth between romance and hostility throughout the series. She also has an on-again/off-again romantic relationship with Miriam "Mimi" Wu.

=== Personality ===
The survivor of a traumatic childhood, Salander is highly introverted and asocial, and has difficulty connecting to people and making friends. She is particularly hostile to men who abuse women and takes special pleasure in exposing and punishing them. This is representative of Larsson's personal views and a major theme throughout the entire series. In the series, Blomkvist speculates that Salander might be on the autism spectrum. Her mental state is never definitively described, an ambiguity that many antagonists in the series try to use against her: her sexually abusive public guardian, Nils Bjurman, describes her as "a sick, murderous, insane fucking person", while her one-time jailer Dr. Peter Teleborian describes her as "paranoid", "psychotic", "obsessive", and an "egomaniacal psychopath".

On the other hand, Larsson stated that he thought that she might be looked upon as something of an unusual kind of sociopath, due to her traumatic life experiences and inability to conform to social norms.

In the book The Psychology of the Girl with the Dragon Tattoo, on the question "Is Salander a psychopath?", Melissa Burkley, Ph.D. and Dr. Stephanie Mullins-Sweatt write: "Although Salander is antagonistic and violent, she doesn't appear to lack a conscience, which is the hallmark trait of a psychopath. While she may not always follow society's rules, she does have her own set of moral principles that abide by a code of right and wrong."

At the end of the third book in the series, Salander is declared sane and competent:

In the exhilarating court scene in The Girl Who Kicked the Hornet's Nest, Salander's lawyer, Annika Giannini, tramples Dr. Teleborian as she demonstrates that Lisbeth is "just as sane and intelligent as anyone in this room." This victory puts Lisbeth back on the right side of the asylum's doors, as her declaration of incompetence is rescinded, then and there. Sanity prevails.

Writers have described Salander as a "fiercely unconventional and darkly kooky antiheroine", a "superhero", a "misfit", and "an androgynous, asocial, bisexually active... loner who makes a living as a computer hacker..." Jennie Punter in Queen's Quarterly wrote that "the diminutive, flat-chested, chain-smoking, tattoo-adorned, anti-social, bisexual, genius computer hacker Lisbeth Salander" has become "one of the most compelling characters in recent popular fiction".

== Storyline in books ==
=== Millennium series ===
==== The Girl with the Dragon Tattoo ====
In The Girl with the Dragon Tattoo (2005), Lisbeth Salander is introduced as a gifted, but deeply troubled, researcher and computer hacker working for Milton Security. Her boss, Dragan Armansky, commissions her to research disgraced journalist Mikael Blomkvist at the behest of a wealthy businessman, Henrik Vanger. When Blomkvist finds out that Salander hacked his computer, he hires her to assist him in investigating the disappearance of Vanger's grandniece, Harriet, 40 years earlier. Salander uses her research skills to uncover a series of murders, dating back decades and tied to Harriet's disappearance. During the investigation, Salander and Blomkvist become lovers.

The novel reveals Salander was declared legally incompetent as a child and is under the care of legal guardian Holger Palmgren, one of the few people in the world she trusts and cares for. When Palmgren suffers a stroke, the court appoints her a new guardian: Nils Bjurman, a sadist who forces Salander to perform oral sex in return for access to her allowance. In a second sex session at his flat, he violently rapes and sodomizes her, unaware that she is recording his actions with a hidden camera. A few days later, she returns to his flat and, after disabling him with a taser, tapes his mouth and fastens him to his bed with his own bondage equipment, and finally sodomizes him with a huge dildo. She then explains that she will release the video recording of him raping her if he does not do exactly what she tells him, or if anything happens to her. She demands that he annul her legal incompetence and restore her sole access to her bank account. She tells him that she will visit him when she pleases, and if she ever finds him with a woman, even if she is with him willingly, she will release the tape and destroy his life. Finally, she tattoos the words "I AM A SADISTIC PIG, A PERVERT, AND A RAPIST" on his abdomen, unlocks his handcuffs, and departs.

Salander eventually uncovers evidence that Harriet's late father, Gottfried, and her brother, Martin, committed the murders. Salander then finds Blomkvist just in time to save him from Martin, who is in the midst of torturing him. She pursues Martin on her motorcycle, but he is killed when he deliberately veers into an oncoming truck. Salander later uses her hacking skills to discover that Harriet Vanger is alive and hiding in Australia, and to get sensitive information about Blomkvist's arch-nemesis, corrupt media magnate Hans-Erik Wennerström. With the information uncovered by Salander, Blomkvist publishes an exposé article and book that ruins Wennerström and transforms Blomkvist's magazine, Millennium, into one of the most respected and profitable in Sweden.

During her investigation of Wennerström, Salander uses her hacking skills and a series of disguises to withdraw billions of Swedish kronor from Wennerström's off-shore accounts. She anonymously reveals the address of Wennerström's final hideout to a lawyer with criminal connections, and Wennerström is murdered three days later, supposedly owing much money to the drug cartels.

At the end of the book, Salander acknowledges to herself that she has fallen in love with Blomkvist. On her way with a Christmas present to tell him so, however, she sees him with his longtime lover, Millennium editor Erika Berger. Heartbroken, Salander dumps the present in the garbage and cuts off all contact with him.

==== The Girl Who Played with Fire ====
The Girl Who Played with Fire (2006) begins with Salander's returning to Sweden after having traveled for a year. Shortly afterward, Salander is falsely implicated in the murder of three people: Bjurman and two of Blomkvist's colleagues. The frame-up is in fact a conspiracy between her biological father, former Soviet spy Alexander Zalachenko, and the Section, an illegal faction within Säpo, the Swedish Security Service, whose members had protected her father after he defected from the USSR. Zalachenko had been a high-ranking member of the GRU, and his defection was regarded by Säpo as an intelligence windfall, thus leading to the Section's covering up his subsequent illegal activities. Zalachenko had his son (and Salander's half-brother) Ronald Niedermann kill Blomkvist's colleagues, who were writing an exposé article on Zalachenko and Neidermann's prostitution ring, and Bjurman, a former Säpo employee who would have been exposed in the article as Salander's rapist. The Section then falsely incriminates Salander to cover up their concealment of Zalachenko's crimes.

Blomkvist tries to help Salander, even though she wants nothing to do with him. When she hacks into his computer, he leaves her his notes on the prostitution ring, from which she learns that Zalachenko is behind the frame-up. By the end of the novel, she tracks Zalachenko to his farm, where he shoots her in the head and has Niedermann bury her alive. She digs her way out, however, and hits her father in the face with an axe before losing consciousness. Blomkvist finds her and calls an ambulance, saving her life.

The novel expands upon Salander's childhood. She is portrayed as having been an extremely bright but asocial child who would violently lash out at anyone who threatened or picked on her. This was in part the result of a troubled home life; Zalachenko repeatedly beat her mother but escaped punishment because the Section perceived his value to the Swedish State as being more important than her mother's civil rights.

One day, when Salander was 12, Zalachenko beat her mother so badly that she sustained permanent brain damage. In retaliation, Salander hurled a homemade Molotov cocktail into her father's car, leaving him permanently disfigured and in chronic pain. The Section, fearing this would lead to their exposure, had the girl declared legally insane and sent to a Children's Psychiatric Hospital in Uppsala. While there, Salander was placed under the direct surveillance of psychiatrist Dr. Peter Teleborian, who had earlier conspired with the Section to have her declared insane. During her stay at the hospital, Teleborian put her in restraints for the most trivial infractions as a way of venting his repressed pedophilic urges. On the Section's orders, Teleborian declared Salander legally incompetent so that no one would ever believe her accounts of what they had done. They then had Bjurman, a lawyer in their employ, appointed as her guardian after Palmgren's stroke.

==== The Girl Who Kicked the Hornets' Nest ====
In the third Millennium novel, The Girl Who Kicked the Hornets' Nest (2007), Salander is arrested for the assault on Zalachenko, while she recuperates in the hospital. Zalachenko, who is a patient in the same hospital, is murdered by someone in the Section, who then tries to kill Salander; fortunately, Salander's lawyer (Annika Giannini, Blomkvist's sister) has barred the door. The would-be assassin then commits suicide.

Due to her deep-seated mistrust of authority, Salander refuses at first to cooperate in any way with her defense, relying instead on her friends in Sweden's hacker community. They eventually help Blomkvist discover the full scope of the Section's conspiracy, which he strives to publish at the risk of his own life. Salander eventually writes, and passes to Giannini, an exact description of the sexual abuse she suffered at Bjurman's hands, but written in such a way as to make it sound hallucinatory so as to mislead the prosecution.

At her trial, Salander is defiant and uncooperative. The prosecuting counsel uses testimony from Teleborian, appearing as their principal witness, to depict Salander as insane goth lesbian pervert, in need of long-term care. Giannini then destroys Teleborian's credibility by introducing the recording of Salander's rape and produces extensive evidence of the Section's plot, published in Millennium that morning by Blomkvist. At the same time Giannini starts questioning Teleborian, the 10 members of the Section are arrested and charged with crimes against national security. Police briefly interrupt Salander's trial to arrest Teleborian for possession of child pornography, which Salander's fellow hackers uncovered from his laptop and sent to the authorities. Salander is set free the same day, her name cleared.

After she is cleared of the charges, Salander receives word that, as Zalachenko's solo known relative, she inherited his money and properties. She instructs the lawyer to liquidate everything and donate to charity, however gets intrigued by the property - a disused brick factory and decides to check it out. Arriving at the address, she finds out that it was a front for kidnapped russian women and find two dead bodies. She realizes someone is inside the building but before she can leave, she is attacked by Niedermann, completely insane but ready for revenge. Niedermann has raided the motorcycle gang, killed his contact and has been hiding there since the confrontation with Salander at Zalachenko's farm. In an intense game of cat and mouse, she manages to outsmart him, nailing his feet to the floor and then makes an anonymous call to the same motorcycle gang. As they arrive to kill Niedermann, she contacts the police.

That night, Blomkvist shows up at her door, and unable to find a reason to reject him yet again, they finally reconcile.

=== Continuation novels ===
==== The Girl in the Spider's Web ====
In The Girl in the Spider's Web (2015), written by David Lagercrantz as a continuation of the original series, Salander is hired by scientist Frans Balder to find out who hacked his network and stole his quantum computer technology. She hacks into the network of his company, Solifon, and discovers that his data was stolen by a criminal organization called the "Spider Society", with help from accomplices within Solifon and the American National Security Agency. When Balder is murdered, Salander, with Blomkvist's help, saves Balder's autistic son August from the Spider Society's assassins, and she is badly wounded in the process. She bonds with August, a fellow math prodigy, and becomes his protector.

Salander learns the Spider Society is led by her twin sister Camilla, a sociopath who as a child tormented her and delighted in the abuse their mother suffered at their father's hands. Camilla sends assassin Jan Holtster to kill Salander and August. Salander overpowers Holtster, however, and gives the police August's drawing of him. She has an opportunity to shoot Camilla during her escape, but cannot bring herself to kill her sister and allows her to get away.

Salander returns August to his mother, Hanna, kicks Hanna's abusive boyfriend out of the house, and gives Hanna and August plane tickets to Munich so they can start over. She then supplies Blomkvist with information she hacked from the NSA, which he uses to write an exposé article that results in the arrests of Camilla's accomplices and re-establishes Millennium as the most influential news magazine in Sweden. Salander shows up at Blomkvist's apartment, and they spend the night together.

==== The Girl Who Takes an Eye for an Eye ====
Lagercrantz's second novel in the series, The Girl Who Takes an Eye for an Eye, was published in 2017.

==== The Girl Who Lived Twice ====
Lagercrantz's third and final novel in the series, The Girl Who Lived Twice, was published in 2019.

== Portrayals in films ==
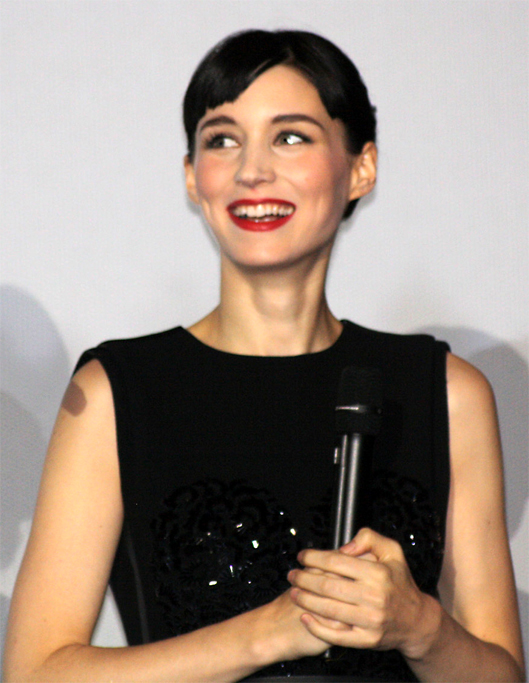
Mara's portrayal of Lisbeth Salander in the 2011 American remake attracted critical acclaim from commentators.

In 2009, the Swedish film and television studio Yellow Bird produced a trilogy of films based upon the first three novels. In these films, Salander is played as an adult by Noomi Rapace and as a child by Tehilla Blad. Rapace received a BAFTA Award for Best Actress in a Leading Role nomination in 2011.

In the 2011 English-language film adaptation of the first book, Salander is played by Rooney Mara, who received a nomination for the Academy Award for Best Actress for her performance.

The Girl in the Spider's Web, Lagercrantz's first continuation novel, was adapted into a 2018 English-language film. Salander is portrayed by Claire Foy, with Beau Gadsdon as her younger self.

== Reception ==
David Denby of The New Yorker stated that the character of Lisbeth Salander clearly accounts for a large part of the novels' success. Deirdre Donahue of USA Today referred to Salander as "one of the most startling, engaging and sometimes perplexing heroines in recent memory." The New York Times's David Kamp called her "one of the most original characters in a thriller to come along in a while." Likewise, Muriel Dobbin from The Washington Times dubbed her one of the most fascinating characters to emerge in crime fiction in years; "Her remoteness and her capacity for anger and violence are in contrast with a desperate vulnerability that she reveals only to the most unlikely of people."

Reviewing the first Swedish film, Roger Ebert noted that it is "a compelling thriller to begin with, but it adds the rare quality of having a heroine more fascinating than the story". The Independent's Jonathan Gibbs called the character "a vision of female empowerment – a kind of goth-geek Pippi Longstocking," but also an "agglomeration of clichés." Richard Schickel of Los Angeles Times suggested that Salander represents something new in the thriller genre; "She's a tiny bundle of post-modernist tropes, beginning with her computer skills."

Laura Wilson wrote in The Guardian that by Lagercrantz's third continuation novel, The Girl Who Lived Twice (2019), "the main characters have, sadly, become subject to the law of diminishing returns – in particular Salander, who is now just another all-purpose kick-ass heroine."

Since 2015, there is a street named after Salander in Larsson's home town in northern Sweden, Skellefteå. It is called Lisbeth Salanders gata and is surrounded by other names from local literature.

Colombian punk band Rose Riots released a song called Salander in 2024. The song portrays some aspects of the character and references elements from the novel, such as fire and the idea that Lisbeth is not the prey but the hunter.
