= Feminism in Sweden =

Feminism in Sweden is a significant social and political influence within Swedish society. Swedish political parties across the political spectrum commit to gender-based policies in their public political manifestos. The Swedish government assesses all policy according to the tenets of gender mainstreaming. Women in Sweden are 45% of the political representatives in the Swedish Parliament. Women make up 43% of representatives in local legislatures as of 2014. In addition, in 2014, newly sworn in Foreign Minister Margot Wallström announced a feminist foreign policy.

Swedish feminism dates back to the 17th century and was discussed in intellectual circles throughout the 18th century. Since the publication Samtal emellan Argi Skugga och en obekant Fruentimbers Skugga by Margareta Momma in 1738, followed by Hedvig Charlotta Nordenflycht's famous poem Fruntimrens försvar (To the Defense of Women, 1761) debate on gender roles and gender equality has become a mainstream topic.

Women had conditional suffrage during the Age of Liberty in 1718–1772. With a relatively high level of education, in 1862, unmarried Swedish women were the first worldwide to be granted conditional right to vote in municipal elections. Universal women suffrage followed in 1921. Since then, Sweden has remained a forerunner of gender equality driven by a both intellectual and practical feminist movement. In the 21st century, Sweden has seen the rise of anti-gender campaigns targeting transgender people, gender studies, and intersectional feminist and queer movements, reflecting a broader transnational backlash against gender justice and inclusion. Among these are so-called "gender-critical" actors who present themselves as radical feminists while advancing trans-exclusionary positions.

In 2014, Sweden's Feminist Initiative became the first feminist political party to win a mandate in the European parliament, rediscussing feminism from a decisively antiracist perspective that includes the perspectives of people of color.

== History ==
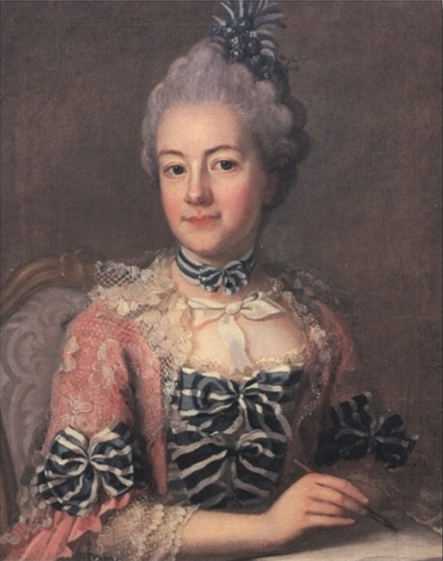
Hedvig Charlotta Nordenflycht by Ulrika Pasch

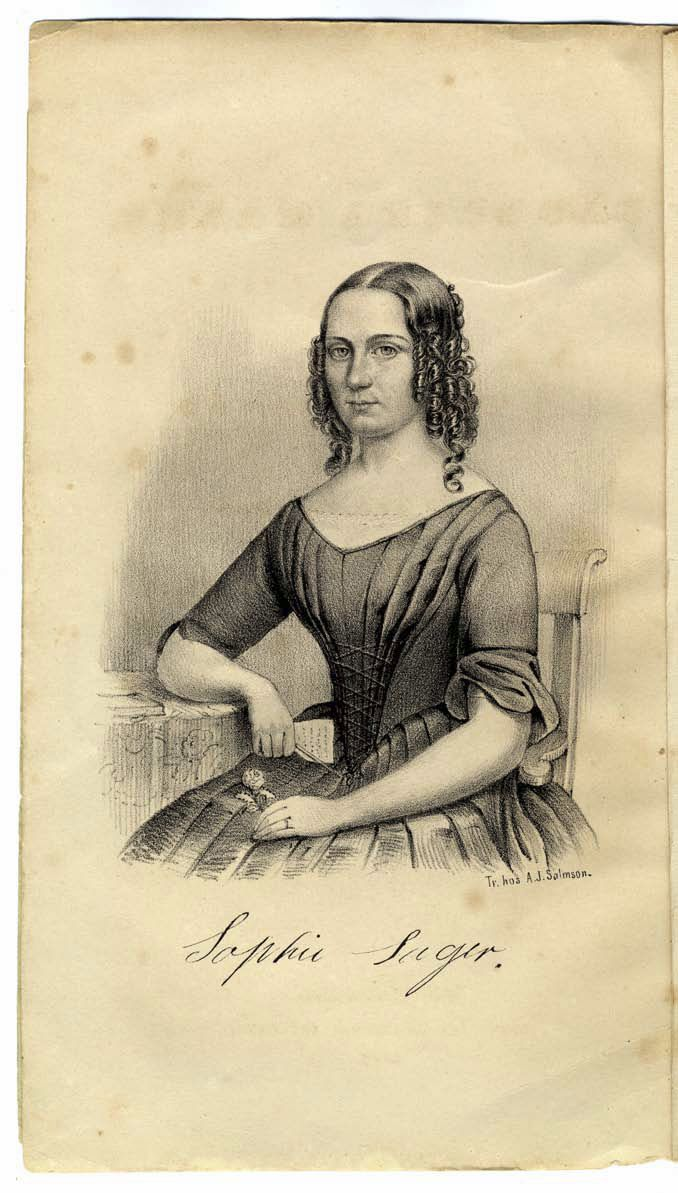
Sophie Sager was one of the first Swedish feminist activists of the modern era.

=== Protofeminism ===
During the 17th century, questions around gender roles, gender equality and women's rights were raised by individuals such as Sophia Elisabet Brenner and Beata Rosenhane, but these were rare exceptions.

During the 18th century, gender roles, gender equality and reform in women's social and legal status were discussed in public debate and literature. Many anonymous female journalists and writers participated under pseudonyms in temporary periodicals, often in the form of a fictions correspondence, questioning the status of women, only a minority of whom, however, has been identified. Among them were Margareta Momma, Catharina Ahlgren and Anna Maria Rückerschöld. In 1761, Hedvig Charlotta Nordenflycht wrote her famous poem Fruntimrens försvar (To the Defense of Women).

=== First wave feminism ===
The first civil-society organisation founded by women in Sweden was the charitable society Välgörande fruntimmerssällskapet, which was founded in Stockholm in 1819 by a group of upper-class women under the leadership of Princess Sophie Albertine of Sweden. Its purpose was to support poor women. This was the first time in Sweden women organized to achieve and reform something in society by a public voice. Though the subject may seem non controversial, the act of women organizing to change society was in itself radical. This was to be followed by numerous other charitable women's societies during the 19th century.

In 1839, Carl Jonas Love Almqvist started a long literary debate regarding gender roles through his famous novel Det går an, in which he argued for free love and the right of Cohabitation without the restrictions of marriage and the right for women to experience love without losing their independence.

In 1848, Sophie Sager aroused considerable controversy after reporting a rape attempt and going on to win her case. She became the perhaps first woman in Sweden to make public speeches in favor of feminism, which made her famous but also ridiculed as a feminist figure. Hers was, however, an isolated attempt, and did not start any organized movement.

In 1855, Josefina Deland founded the Svenska lärarinnors pensionsförening (The Society for Retired Female Teachers) to provide for retired female teachers and governesses. Being an educator was at the time one of the few professions available for an educated woman to support herself, which was at the time an important question for women. This was arguably the first time women organized themselves to deal with a wider women's issue in Sweden.

In 1856, Fredrika Bremer published the novel Hertha, which aroused great controversy and created the "Hertha Debate". The two foremost questions were the abolition of legal guardianship for unmarried women, and for the state to provide women an equivalent to a university. Social change arrived: in 1858, a reform granted unmarried women the right to apply for legal majority by a simple procedure, and in 1861, Högre lärarinneseminariet was founded as a "Women's University". In 1859, the first women's magazine in Sweden and the Nordic countries, the Tidskrift för hemmet, was founded by Sophie Adlersparre and Rosalie Olivecrona. This has been referred to as the starting point of a women's movement in Sweden.

The second half of the 19th century saw the creation of several women's rights organisations and a considerable activity within both active organisations as well as intellectual debate. The organized women's movement begun in 1873, when the Married Woman's Property Rights Association was co-founded by Anna Hierta-Retzius and Ellen Anckarsvärd. The prime task of the organization was to fully abolish coverture. In 1884, the Fredrika Bremer Association was founded by Sophie Adlersparre to work for the improvement in women's rights. The Swedish Dress reform Association worked to liberate women from the contemporary Victorian dress fashion and thus improve their health and give them more freedom of movement.

The 1880s saw the so-called Sedlighetsdebatten ('Virtue Debate'), where gender roles were discussed in literary debates in regards to sexual double standards, as opposed to sexual equality. One of the organs for this was the Svenska Federationen, who worked to put a stop to the regulation system of prostitutes and questioned the contemporaneous sexual double standards by which this system was justified. Women organized prominently in the Woman's Christian Temperance Union, whose Swedish section Vita bandet ("White ribbon") was founded in 1897.

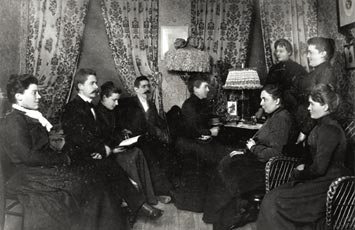
1902 meeting of the Committee for Women's Agitation, the precursor of the Women's Trade Union. The meeting was held at the Anna Sterky residence. Kata Dahlström is seen of the left.

Women also started to organize politically via the Swedish work- and union movement, where they were early inducted in to the movement and came to play an important role. In 1888 the first 'Women's Worker's Club' was founded in Malmö, which was followed by its Stockholm eqvivalent and a number of local women's workers club, which eventually united to form the Social Democratic Women in Sweden, and via the women's worker's club, women were in parallel included in the trade unions, uniting in the Women's Trade Union; and Alina Jägerstedt ensured that women were included as party members at the very foundation of the Swedish Social Democratic Party. The well organized Swedish working women came to play a vital part in the integration of women in the public political ad professional sphere, and there were more women active within the Social Democratic movement than any other policial party.

In 1902 the Swedish Society for Woman Suffrage was founded, supported by the Social Democratic women's Clubs. Women's suffrage was introduced in 1919-1921, followed by the Behörighetslagen in 1923, with women being formally awarded equal rights as male citizens. Between 1921 and 1971, the successor of the suffrage movement, the Svenska Kvinnors Medborgarförbund, worked to ensure that the formal laws of gender equality was enforced in practice and not remain on paper only. From 1921 to 1954, Kvinnliga medborgarskolan vid Fogelstad ('Fogelstad Citizen School for Women') held courses to educate women about their new rights as full and equal citizens and encouraged them to use their new rights.

During the interwar period, various women's magazines and organizations existed for women of all political views and classes. Women organized in the women's wings of the political parties, such as the Social Democratic Women in Sweden, Centerkvinnorna, Liberala kvinnor and the Moderate Women, through which they channeled their demands in to politics, entering the political life and voicing their interests in Parliament, and during the Interwar period both the Föreningen Kvinnolistan (Literary: 'The Women's List Association') of 1927 and the Kommittén för ökad kvinnorepresentation (Literary: 'The committee for increased women's representation') of 1937 lobbied the political parties to appoint more women to political office.

=== Second wave feminism and beyond ===
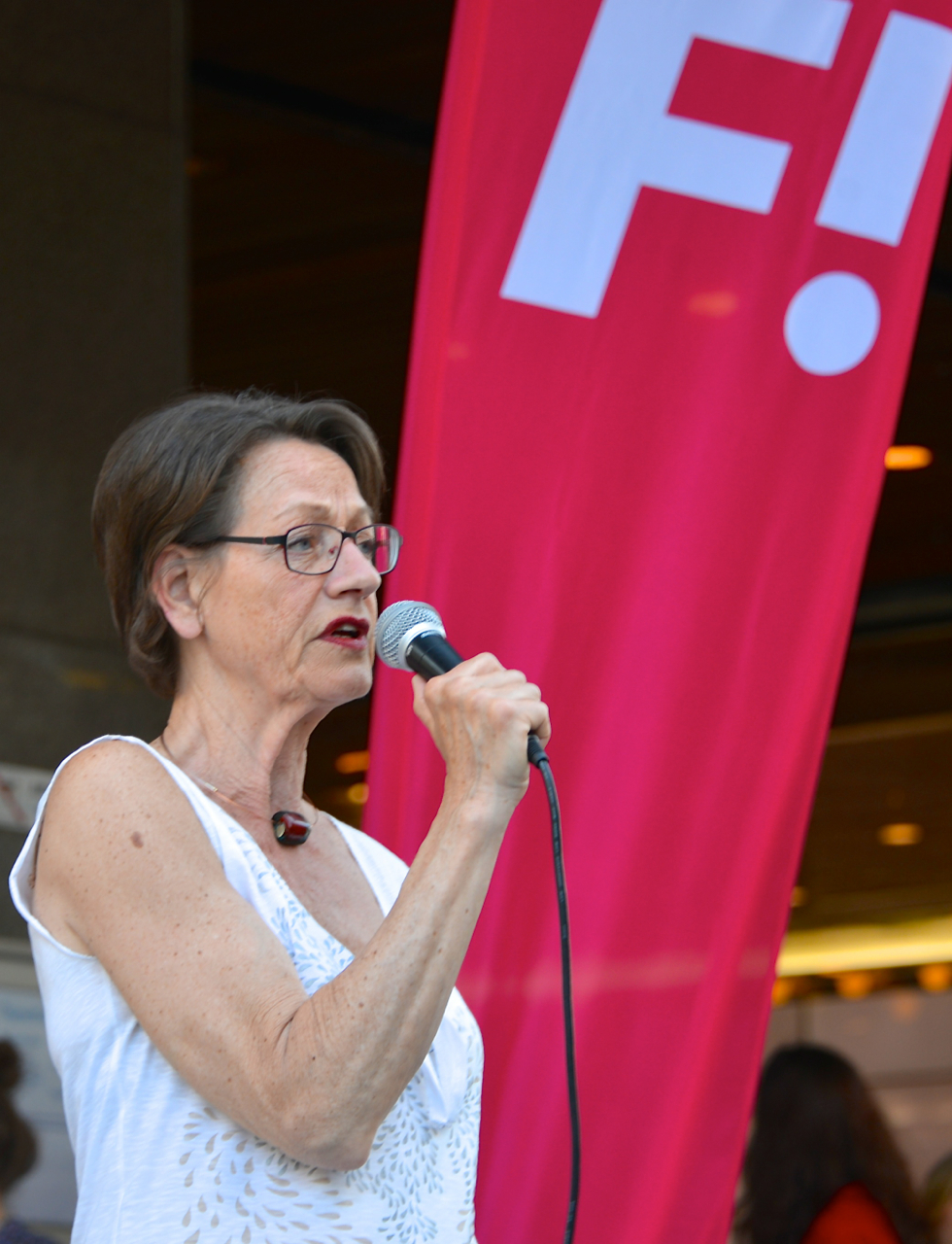
Gudrun Schyman speaks on behalf of the Feminist Initiative (Fi), 2014, in Stockholm.

During the 1960s- and 1970s, Sweden experienced a new wave of feminism: in 1968, the Group 8 was founded and raised a number of issues within gender equality. In 1973, Women of Labour was split from Group 8. Popular culture included feminism values, such as Röda bönor.

The campaign for increased political representation of women by Kommittén för ökad kvinnorepresentation in 1937-1948 was followed by the Samarbetskommittén för ökad kvinnorepresentation (Literary: 'The Cooperation Committee for increased women's representation') in 1968 and in 1991 by the campaign of the Stödstrumporna (Literary: 'The Support stockings'), resulting in the introduction of the Varannan damernas (Literary: 'Every Other Ladies [Elective seat]') principle and almost half of the elected officials to the Parliament being women in the 1994 Swedish general election.

The late 1990s saw a renewal of feminism activity in Sweden, which was given great encouragement by the government. Left Party was particularly active to raise the question under Gudrun Schyman.

In 1997 Swedish Women's Lobby was founded by the Government of Sweden. During the 2000s, it led to feminist campaigns such as Bara Bröst and Dirty Diaries, as well as reactions such as The Gender War, a critical SVT documentary by Evin Rubar on radical feminism in Sweden.

In 2005, the Feminist Initiative was founded as a political force, centered around Gudrun Schyman, who has since the 1990s been a leading figure within Swedish feminism.

In 2017 Maria Teresa Rivera became the first woman in the world granted asylum because of being wrongly jailed for disregarding a ban on abortion. She disregarded the ban in El Salvador and was given asylum in Sweden.

=== Anti-gender campaigns ===
Sweden has increasingly seen the influence of anti-gender campaigns, which scholars identify as part of a transnational trend aimed at undermining gender equality, delegitimizing transgender rights, and attacking feminist, queer, and intersectional understandings of social justice. A key element of this development is gender-critical rhetoric, which researchers describe as a core component of anti-gender politics in Sweden. Some argue that this rhetoric functions to exclude trans and queer people, oppose the recognition of gender identity, and seek to delegitimize academic fields such as gender studies. According to Karlberg, Korolczuk, and Sältenberg (2025), these developments form part of what they call "insidious de-democratization," a gradual process through which discursive and political shifts marginalize already vulnerable groups, including trans people, migrants, and racialized minorities, while eroding liberal democratic norms.

Anti-gender views have been promoted by a range of actors in Sweden, including the right-wing Sweden Democrats and the Christian Democrats, who have opposed legal reforms strengthening transgender rights. These parties often frame their opposition in terms of national values or the protection of women. Other actors have also played a role in promoting anti-gender rhetoric. One example is the Swedish Women's Lobby (SWL), which has been criticized by advocacy groups for adopting trans-exclusionary positions and contributing to the spread of anti-gender rhetoric in Swedish public discourse. In 2025, SWL launched the Women's Platform for Action International (WoPAI), a transnational network promoting so-called "sex-based rights" and opposing what it refers to as a "pro-gender movement," a "queer agenda," and the concept of gender identity. This shift aligns with what Claire House has identified as a broader international trend beginning in the mid-2010s, where feminist actors increasingly participate in anti-gender and regressive politics, often with consequences for trans rights, a trend she illustrates, in part, by referencing the case of Sweden. The increasing normalization of anti-gender discourse has coincided with growing political violence and intimidation, particularly directed at trans advocates, feminist scholars, and racialized activists. This includes online harassment, threats, and public vilification. Researchers argue that such violence, both symbolic and physical, plays a central role in silencing dissent and undermining democratic participation.

== Feminist influence ==
=== Women policy makers ===
In 2014, women constituted 45% of the political representatives in the Swedish Parliament. Women furthermore made up 43% of representatives in local legislatures. Women are 52% of the Ministers in the Swedish Government (November 2015).

While there are no legal quotas for female candidates in Sweden, most parties have internal policies to promote the participation of women. Some political parties have voluntary quotas. Explanations for levels of women's political participation include that women's organisations and community activists have been instrumental in pressing for greater female representation.

=== Gender mainstreaming ===
The Swedish government assesses all policy according to the tenets of gender mainstreaming. Gender mainstreaming is used in government offices, central government agencies, regional governments, municipalities and local government. This has been the case since 1994, with gender mainstreaming meaning that gender, in a stakeholder sense as members of society, is taken into account when government considers new policies.

=== Prostitution laws ===
Since 1999, it has been illegal to pay for sex in Sweden. The purchaser of prostitution is criminalized, not the prostitute.This is also called the Nordic model approach to prostitution.

The law is in accordance with Sweden's gender equality program. Theoretically, the gender of the seller and buyer are immaterial under the law, that is, it is gender neutral. However, the law is politically constructed, discussed, and enforced in the context of men buying sex from women. The Swedish Government believes that men buying sex from prostituted women constitutes a form of violence against women, which should be thus eliminated by reducing demand. Demand for women's "sexual services" is constructed as a form of male dominance over women, and as a practice which maintains patriarchal hegemony. (see Feminist views on prostitution).

A policy position of the Swedish Social Democratic Party and the Swedish Left Party is to criminalize the purchase of sexual acts bought overseas by Swedish citizens.

=== Military ===
Since 1989, all military branches and positions (including combat) are open to women. Beginning in 2018, both women and men are conscripted.

=== Domestic violence law ===
Incidents of domestic violence and abuse are assessed cumulatively in Sweden, so that each incidence is taken into account. There is specific reference to abuse by a man against a woman with whom he is in a close personal relationship, who can then be liable to a charge of "gross violation of a woman's integrity".

=== Rape law ===
In 1965, Sweden made marital rape illegal. In 2018, Sweden passed a law defining sex without consent in clear body language or words as rape, even if no force or threats are used; previously a rape conviction had required proof that the offender used force or that the victim was in a vulnerable state.

=== Gender and policy ===
Sweden has a Minister for Gender Equality. The Swedish government allocates money specifically to gender equality in the annual budget. In 2014 the Swedish government allocated 252 million Krona for gender equality. Swedish political parties across the political spectrum commit to gender-based policies in their public political manifestos.

=== Swedish Feminist Foreign Policy ===
In October 2014 Foreign Minister Margot Wallström announced that their country would henceforth follow a Feminist Foreign Policy as the first country globally. Throughout their foreign policy the Swedish Government has since applied a systematic gender equality perspective. In 2018 the Swedish Government published a handbook outlining the details of their feminist approach.

The Swedish Feminist Foreign Policy is based on the "three R's", meaning they focus on Rights, Representation and Resources, basing their approach on the Reality in which women live today. Strongly reflecting an intersectional approach to feminism, Sweden's Feminist Foreign Policy is a transformative agenda, aiming at changing structures and enhancing the visibility of women and girls, not just as passive audience but as actors in foreign affairs.

==== The Three R's ====
The Feminist Foreign Policy is structured around Rights, Representation and Resources and based on the different Realities in which women live.

==== Rights ====
Concerning the first "R", Rights, the Swedish Government is committed to promoting women's and girl's human rights, highlighting especially the combatting of all forms of violence and discrimination which restrict their freedoms. In order to implement these commitments, the Swedish Government drew up an Action Plan, which has six objectives: the full enjoyment of human rights, freedom from physical, psychological and sexual violence, participation in preventing and resolving conflicts, and post-conflict peacebuilding, political participation and influence in all areas of society, economic rights and empowerment and sexual and reproductive health and rights (SRHR) representation. Their rights' approach is based on a number of international frameworks including:

- the Universal Declaration of Human Rights,
- the Convention on the Elimination of All Forms of Discrimination Against Women,
- the declarations and actions plans from the UN World Conference on Women in Beijing and the International Conference on Population and Development in Cairo, as well as the final documents from the follow-up conferences,
- the United Nations Security Council Resolution 1325 on Women, Peace and Security, and subsequent resolutions,
- the 2030 Agenda for Sustainable Development and the agreements from the conferences on financing for development,
- the EU action plan for gender equality and women's empowerment in EU's external relations (2016–2020)

==== Representation ====
A survey from 2017 shows that there are only 17 women who are heads of state globally. Additionally, a study of 31 major peace processes between 1992 and 2011 revealed that only 9% of negotiators were women. Of those who signed peace agreements, more than 96 per cent were men. This is why Representation is another focus point for the Swedish Government, promoting women's participation and influence in all decision-making processes on all levels and areas.

==== Resources ====
The Swedish Feminist Foreign policy works to ensure that government resources are allocated with a gender sensitive lens to promote equality and equal opportunities for all women and girls while also promoting targeted measured for the various target groups.

==== Criticism ====
Margot Wallström's endeavour raised many eyebrows in the beginning. Today, it is especially human rights groups pointing to the hypocrisy of a feminist foreign policy in a country which is among the world's largest arms exporter per capita, exporting arms to autocratic regimes which are known for human rights abuses.
