= Opposition to LGBTQ rights =

Opposition to legal rights for lesbian, gay, bisexual, transgender, and queer (LGBTQ) people exists worldwide. Opponents of LGBTQ rights may object to the decriminalization of homosexuality, laws permitting civil unions or partnerships, same-sex parenting and adoption, the inclusion of LGBTQ people in the military, access to assisted reproductive technology, and gender-affirming surgery and hormone therapy for transgender individuals.

Organizations that oppose LGBTQ rights often resist the enactment of laws legalizing same-sex marriage, the passage of anti-discrimination legislation aimed at curbing discrimination against LGBTQ people (including in employment and housing), the adoption of anti-bullying laws to protect LGBTQ minors, the decriminalization of same-gender relationships, and other related laws. These groups are often religious or socially conservative in nature. Such opposition can be motivated by homophobia, transphobia, bigotry, animosity, religion, moral beliefs, political ideologies, or other factors.

According to the Stanford Encyclopedia of Philosophy, "natural law theory offers the most common intellectual defense for differential treatment of gays and lesbians". Dag Øistein Endsjø, a Norwegian scholar and professor of religious studies, and the United Nations Special Rapporteur on Freedom of Religion or Belief, have stated that religious belief underpins most forms of opposition to LGBTQ rights.

== History ==
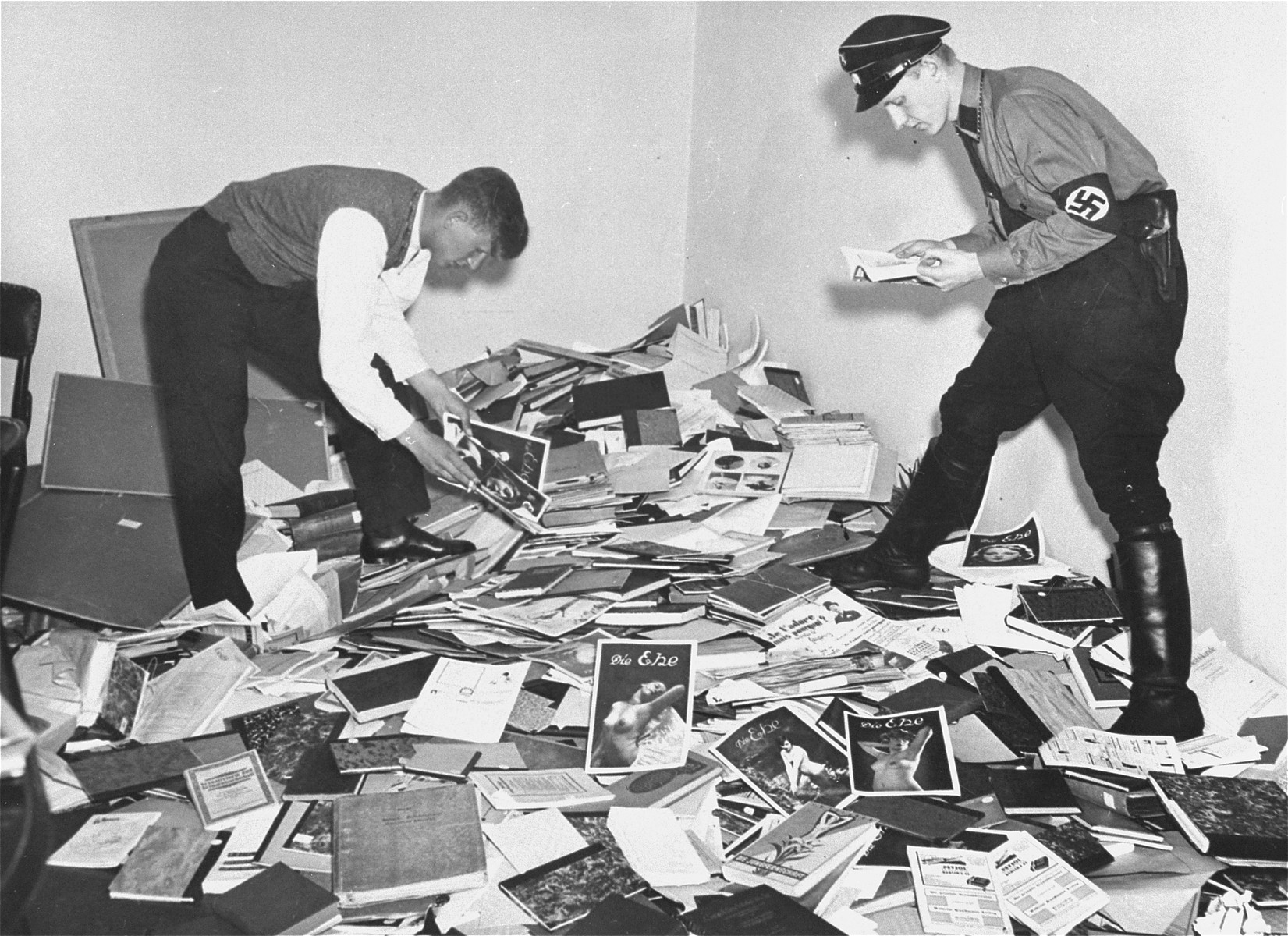
German Student Union members plunder the Institut für Sexualwissenschaft in preparation to burn its books, May 1933

The first organized gay rights movement arose in the late nineteenth century in Germany.

In the 1920s and into the early 1930s, there were LGBTQ communities in cities like Berlin; German-Jewish sexologist Magnus Hirschfeld was one of the most notable spokespeople for LGBTQ rights at this time. When the Nazi party came to power in 1933, one of the party's first acts was to burn down Hirschfeld's Institut für Sexualwissenschaft, where many prominent Nazis had been treated for perceived sexual problems. Initially tolerant to the homosexuality of Ernst Röhm and his followers, many gay men were purged from the Nazi Party following the Night of the Long Knives and the Section 175 Laws began to be enforced again, with gay men interned in concentration camps by 1938. (Note: See Persecution of homosexuals in Nazi Germany and the Holocaust.)

Under the Nazi rule in Germany, the dismantling of rights for LGBTQ individuals was approached in two ways. By strengthening and re-enforcing existing laws that had fallen into disuse, male homosexuality was effectively re-criminalised; homosexuality was treated as a medical disorder, but at a social level rather than individual level intended to reduce the incidence of homosexuality. The treatment was a program of eugenics, starting with sterilisation, then a system of working people to death in forced labour camps, and eventually refined by medical scientists to include euthanasia. The driving force was the elimination of perceived degeneracy at various levels – genetic, social, identity and practice, and the elimination of such genetic material in society. Lifton wrote about this in his book The Nazi Doctors:

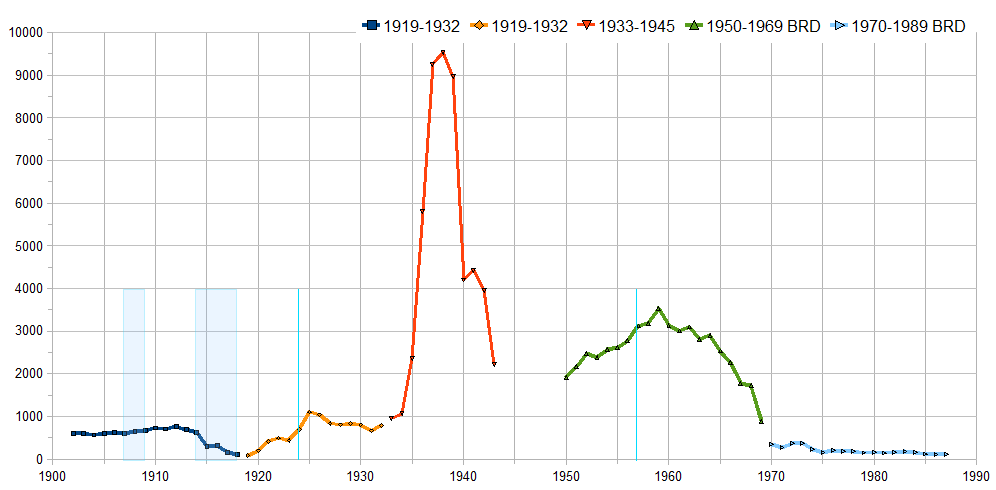
Graph of convictions under Germany's Paragraph 175. Spike occurs during Nazi era, and dropoff after partial repeal in 1969.

[...] sexology and defense of homosexuality [...] were aspects of "sexual degeneration, a breakdown of the family and loss of all that is decent," and ultimately the destruction of the German Folk. [...] medicine was to join in the great national healing mission, and the advance image of what Nazi doctors were actually to become: the healer turned killer. [...] Sterilization policies were always associated with the therapeutic and regenerative principles of the biomedical vision: with the "purification of the national body" and the "eradication of morbid hereditary dispositions." Sterilization was considered part of "negative eugenics" [...]

It is argued that the number of gay people who perished in the Holocaust was quite low in comparison to other Holocaust victims, and confined to Germany itself, based on estimates that of 50,000 gay people who came before the courts, between 5,000 and 15,000 ended up in concentration camps. However, many of those who came before the courts were directed (or volunteered) to undergo sterilisation/castration; they would be included with others who, in line with the historic shift in German society (that started with Westphal, and developed through Krafft-Ebing to Magnus Hirschfeld, of homosexuality being seen as having a neurological, endocrinological or genetic basis), were treated for homosexuality as a medical rather than criminal matter.

After the Second World War, the United States became more intolerant of homosexuality, but many gay men and lesbians decided to reveal their gay identities after meeting others in the military. Many gay bars and villages were created, and a whole gay subculture formed. Campaigns for gay rights began to develop, initially in the UK. Towards the end of the 1960s homosexuality began to be decriminalised and de-medicalised in areas such as the UK, New Zealand, Australia, North America and Europe, in the context of the sexual revolution and anti-psychiatry movements. Organized opposition to gay and lesbian rights began in the 1970s.

== Public opinion ==
Societal attitudes towards homosexuality vary greatly in different cultures and different historical periods, as do attitudes toward sexual desire, activity and relationships in general. All cultures have their own norms regarding appropriate and inappropriate sexuality; some sanction same-sex love and sexuality, while others disapprove of such activities.

According to The 2007 Pew Global Attitudes Project, "Throughout Western Europe and much of the Americas, there is widespread tolerance towards homosexuality. However, the United States, Japan, South Korea, and Israel stand apart from other wealthy nations on this issue; in each of these countries, fewer than half of those surveyed say homosexuality should be accepted by society. Meanwhile, in most of Africa, Asia and the Middle East, there is less tolerance toward homosexuality."

However, a 2012 CNN poll showed that a majority of Americans favor gay rights such as same-sex marriage. In late 2015, a poll of Japanese people also found that a majority supported same-sex marriage.

According to one study, opposition to transgender rights was correlated with a preference for obedience and conformity regardless of partisan affiliation.

== Religious reasons for opposition ==
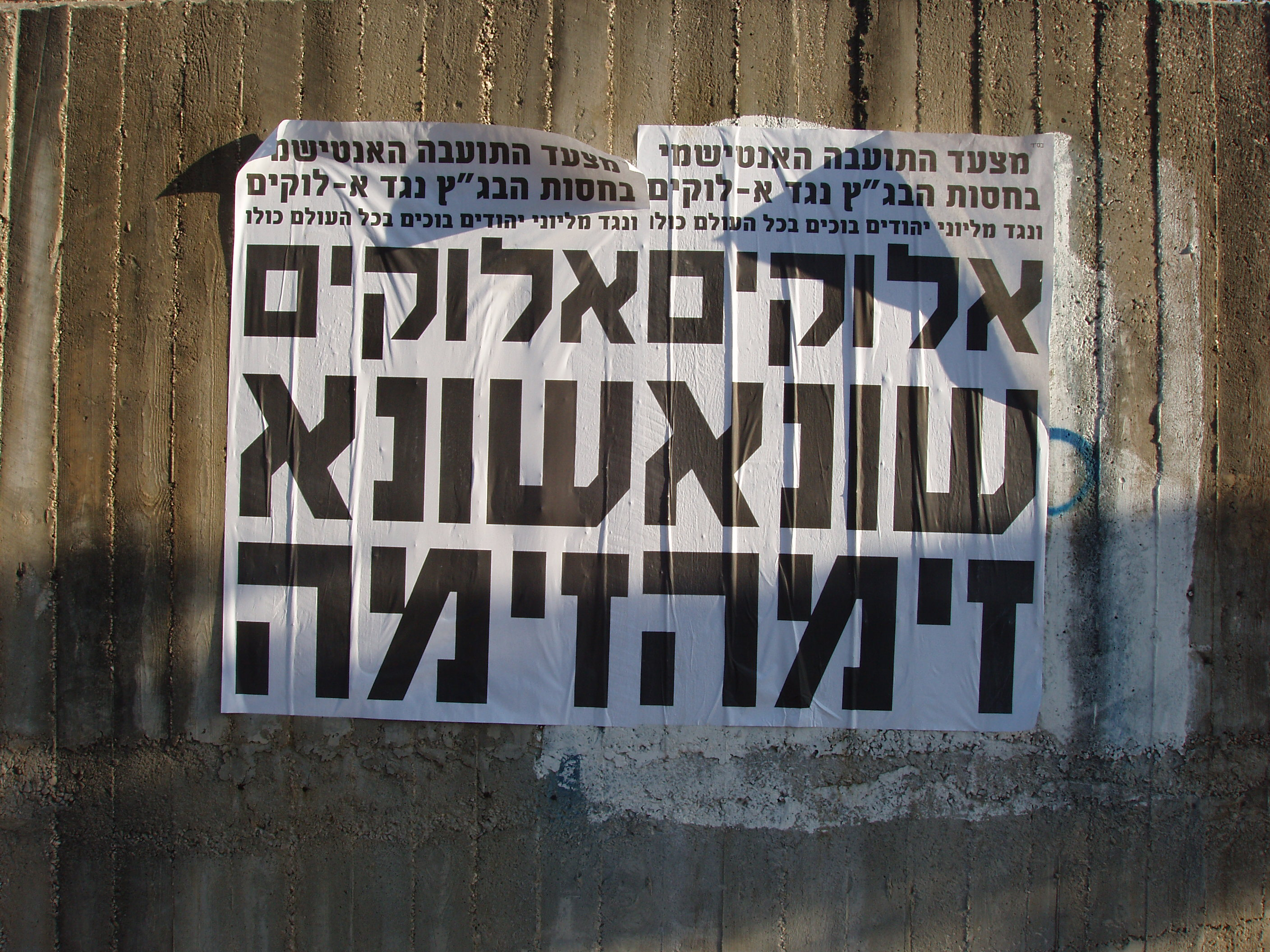
Anti-LGBT posters hung by Haredi groups in Tel Aviv protesting against the Tel Aviv Pride, 2007. Translation: "The Antisemitic abomination walk sponsored by the Supreme Court against God and against millions of crying Jews all over the world. God Hates Lechery"

Many religions, including ones within the Eastern faiths and Abrahamic faiths, do not support homosexual sex. Evangelical Christianity, Catholicism, Mormonism, Orthodox Judaism, and Islam view homosexual sex as a sin and hold that its practice and acceptance in society weakens moral standards.

=== Christian opposition ===
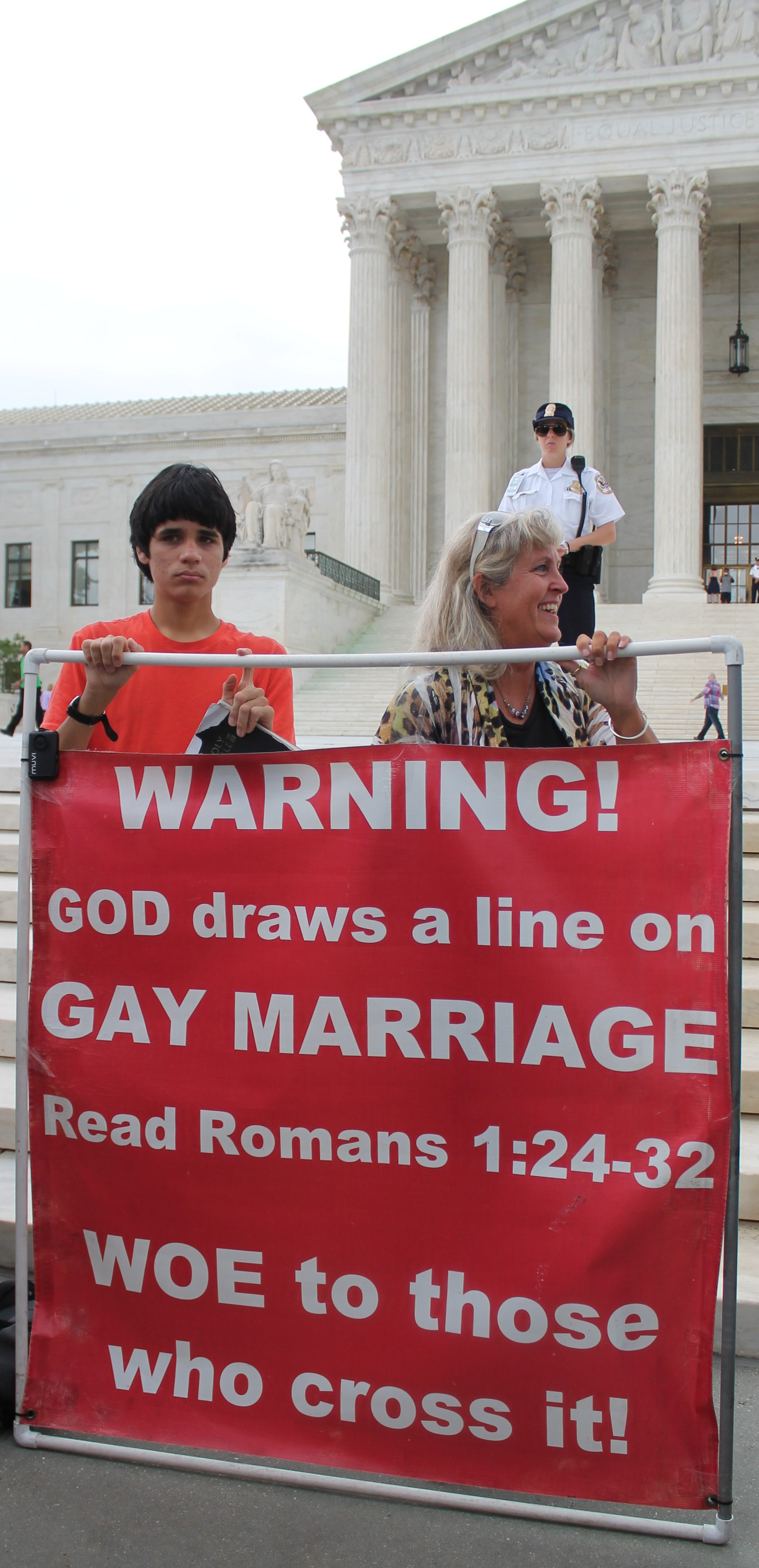
Protesters against same-sex marriage at the U.S. Supreme Court in 2015

Passages in the Old Testament that prohibit man to "lie with mankind as with womankind" (Note: Leviticus 18:22 Archived 8 September 2015 at the Wayback Machine and Leviticus 20:13 Archived 1 September 2015 at the Wayback Machine (KJV).) and the story of Sodom and Gomorrah have historically been interpreted as condemning sodomy. Several Pauline passages have also been cited against male and female homosexuality. (Note: Romans 1:25–28 Archived 21 August 2015 at the Wayback Machine – these are often considered the only explicit references in the Bible discussing female homosexuality.) Christians who take a conservative position on homosexuality endorse this reading of these passages in the belief that God is against same-sex sexual activity, while Christians who take a liberal position believe that these same passages refer to more specific situations, such as pedophilia, rape or abuse, and not homosexuality. The largest Christian body, the Catholic Church, condemns homosexual acts as "gravely sinful" and "intrinsically disordered". The second-largest Christian body, the Eastern Orthodox Church, also condemns homosexual behaviour, as do many denominations of Protestantism.

Within the Catholic Church, the theory of natural law has been employed by philosophers and theologians to justify its condemnation of homosexual behaviour. The theologian Thomas Aquinas maintained that homosexual practice was contrary to natural law, arguing that the primary natural end of the sexual act was procreation, and since said procreation is carried out from a process of sexual fertilization between a man and a woman, homosexual sex is contrary to the very end of said act.

=== Islamic opposition ===
Sodomy is regarded as criminal and forbidden in most Islamic countries, according to Sharia law, and officially carries the death penalty in Saudi Arabia, United Arab Emirates, Iran, Brunei, Mauritania, Nigeria, and Yemen.

It carries the death penalty in Afghanistan under the Taliban. In Egypt, openly gay men have been prosecuted under general public morality laws. (Note: See: Cairo 52.)

In Saudi Arabia, the maximum punishment for homosexuality is public execution, but the government will use other punishments – e.g., fines, jail time, and flagellation – as alternatives, unless it feels that LGBTQ individuals are challenging state authority by engaging in LGBTQ social movements. Since the 1979 Islamic revolution in Iran, the Iranian government has executed more than 4,000 people charged with homosexual acts. After the fall of the Taliban, homosexuality went from a capital crime to one that is punished with fines, prison sentences, and vigilante violence.

Most international human rights organizations, such as Human Rights Watch and Amnesty International, condemn laws that make homosexual relations between consenting adults a crime. Muslim nations insist that such laws are necessary to preserve Islamic morality and virtue. Of the nations with a majority of Muslim inhabitants where homosexuality is criminalized, only Lebanon and Tunisia have organizations which are trying to get homosexuality legalized.

=== Asian religious opposition ===
Among the religions that originated in India, including Hinduism, Buddhism, Jainism and Sikhism, teachings regarding homosexuality are less clear than among the Abrahamic traditions. Unlike the Abrahamic religions, homosexuality is not a 'sin' in Hindu philosophy, while in Buddhism, the Dalai Lama has stated that male-female relationships are intended by nature, though without condemning same-sex relationships. Gender-specific Temples like Aravan worship are dedicated to celebrate the non-heteronormative diverse Indigenous gender & sexuality in Hinduism. In 2005, the Head Cleric of the Akal Takht condemned same-sex marriages. Hinduism is diverse, with no supreme governing body which allows people of diverse SOGIESC communities to marry under Hindu Marriage Law 1951.

=== Scientology opposition ===
Scientology founder L. Ron Hubbard classified homosexuality as a mental illness and paraphilia (then known as "sexual perversion"), citing contemporary psychiatric and psychological textbooks to support his view. Gay people are designated a 1.1. on Hubbard's emotional tone scale, and Hubbard urged society to tackle the issue of "sexual perversion" (including homosexuality), calling it "of vital importance, if one wishes to stop immorality, and the abuse of children." In his book Science of Survival, Hubbard called for drastic action to be taken, saying that: "Such people should be taken from the society as rapidly as possible and uniformly institutionalized; for here is the level of the contagion of immorality, and the destruction of ethics; here is the fodder which secret police organizations use for their filthy operations."

A 2004 article in the St. Petersburg Times reported that the Scientology defines marriage as the union between a man and a woman. After 35 years of being a Scientologist, film producer and director Paul Haggis publicly quit the Church of Scientology over the organization's position on gay rights and a showdown with the Church's spokesperson over the 2008 California Proposition 8 on same-sex marriage.

== Opposition in different countries ==
=== Belarus ===
A 2014 report prepared by the United Kingdom, under the Conservative and Liberal Democrat coalition government of 2010–2015, raised concerns about LGBTQ treatment in Belarus:

The LGBT community suffered increased harassment from the [Belarusian] regime in 2013. The Ministry of Justice denied registration to LGBT groups, and members of the LGBT community were regularly targeted by the security forces and brought in for questioning. The authorities threatened to stigmatise them by informing their colleagues, families, or friends of their sexual orientation. Gay clubs in Minsk and Vitebsk were raided, and those present were filmed and had their details collected. The clubs were then closed down. Gay Pride week in Minsk was disrupted by the authorities who forced owners of venues, where events were due to be held, to withdraw at the last minute. Those events that did take place were raided by the police, and a request for a march through the city was turned down by the authorities.

— "LGBT rights", Corporate Report: Belarus – Country of Concern, (UK Foreign and Commonwealth Office, October 2014)

=== Georgia ===
On 8 July 2023, over 2,000 anti-LGBTQ+ protesters violently disrupted the LGBTQ+ Pride festival in the Georgian capital of Tbilisi. Homophobia remains widespread in Georgia, and several journalists were attacked during similar protests in Tbilisi two years ago.

=== India ===
On 6 October 1860, sodomy was legally forbidden in India according to Section 377 of the Indian Penal Code. This was ruled unconstitutional in 2009 by the Delhi High Court, but reaffirmed on 11 December 2013 by a Supreme Court ruling. It was again legalised by the Supreme Court on 6 September 2018.

=== Indonesia ===
Traditionally, Indonesians are quite tolerant towards LGBTQ people who keep quiet and stay discreet about their private lives. However, this level of tolerance is not extended towards the LGBTQ rights movements, which has faced fierce condemnation in the public sphere from Indonesian authorities. A wave of anti-LGBTQ rhetoric began in January 2016 when Higher Education Minister Mohamad Nasir said LGBTQ people should be barred from university campuses. The Minister called for a ban on gay groups on university campuses after a group of University of Indonesia (UI) students established a counselling and support group called the Support Group and Resource Center on Sexuality Studies (SGRC). The group was meant as a counselling service, resource centre and support group on sexuality and gender issues, especially for LGBTQ youth and students, who often suffer from abuses, harassment, violence and discrimination regarding their gender and sexuality. SGRC sees LGBTQ people as human beings who need a friend and protection. The group, which sought to advocate for those who suffer from gender-based violence, explained that they do not "turn" or "encourage" people to be gay, nor had they tried to "cure" gay people. Amid the heat of the issue, the University of Indonesia refused to be held responsible for SGRC's actions and announced the group was not an officially registered student organisation. Another official pressured smartphone instant-messaging services to drop gay and lesbian-themed emoji, prompting one company to comply.

Muhammadiyah, said it would not issue any edict condemning members of the lesbian, gay, bisexual and transgender (LGBT) community, Muhammadiyah's secretary-general, Abdul Mukti said. Muhammadiyah considered LGBTQ expression immoral, but that publicly condemning people affiliated with those identities and orientations would not help them return to normalcy. Other religious groups, such as Christianity and specifically Roman Catholicism, have expressed their rejection of LGBTQ rights in Indonesia. Indonesian Catholic authorities have reiterated that Catholicism does not recognise same-sex marriage but assured that, despite their perceived transgressions, LGBTQ people should be protected and not harmed.

The Indonesia Psychiatric Association (PDSKJI) classifies homosexuality, bisexuality and transgenderism as mental disorders. Referring to Law No.18/2014 on Mental Health and the association's Mental Health and Mental Disorder Diagnostic Guidelines, the PDSKJI categorises homosexual and bisexual Indonesians as "people with psychiatric problems" and transgender people as having "mental disorders".

Some military figures have used conspiracy theory rhetoric. Defense Minister Ryamizard Ryacudu called the LGBTQ movement a "proxy war" to brainwash Indonesians, and claimed that it received "foreign funding", pointing to funds from United Nations organisations like UNAIDS or Western governments and foundations.

There have been a few incidents of LGBTQ people being harassed. LGBTQ groups are now working on setting up safe houses and draw up evacuation plans in case of need. In Yogyakarta, in February 2016, 23 LGBTQ activists were roughed up by police, who told local media they stopped them from holding a rally to avoid a clash with a hardline Muslim group holding an anti-LGBTQ protest nearby.

The chair of the People's Consultative Assembly, Zulkifli Hasan mentioned in a statement that, "As a movement, the existence of LGBTQ must be opposed. We must limit its room to move. However, as individual people, they must be protected like any other citizen." Anthropologist Sharyn Graham Davies commented that the main focus of this opposition was that sexual and gender diversity may be tolerated but as long as LGBTQ people remain invisible in the Indonesian society and did not form a visible movement. On the other hand, amid fierce hostilities, some officials – including former Governor of Jakarta, Basuki Tjahaja Purnama and former Political, Legal, and Security Affairs Minister Luhut Binsar Panjaitan — have defended the LGBTQ community. "Whoever they are, wherever they work, he or she continues to be an Indonesian citizen. They have the right to be protected as well," Panjaitan said. President Joko Widodo has also expressed support for LGBTQ rights and has called on an end to discrimination.

=== Malaysia ===
Same-sex relationships in Malaysia are criminalised. In 2018, Malaysian LGBTQ people faced government-enforced clampdowns.

=== Poland ===
Opposition to LGBTQ rights in Poland comes mainly from right-wing politics, such as the ruling in 2015-2023 Law and Justice party, and from the Catholic Church in Poland, in which a majority of Poles are members. According to ILGA-Europe's 2020 report, Poland ranks the lowest of European Union countries for LGBTQ rights. According to some opinion polls, opposition to LGBTQ rights has been diminishing, with support for civil partnerships rising from 52% in 2017 to 60% in 2019. The number of Poles who say that homosexuality should not be accepted in society dropped from 41% in 2001 to 24% in 2019.

=== Russia ===
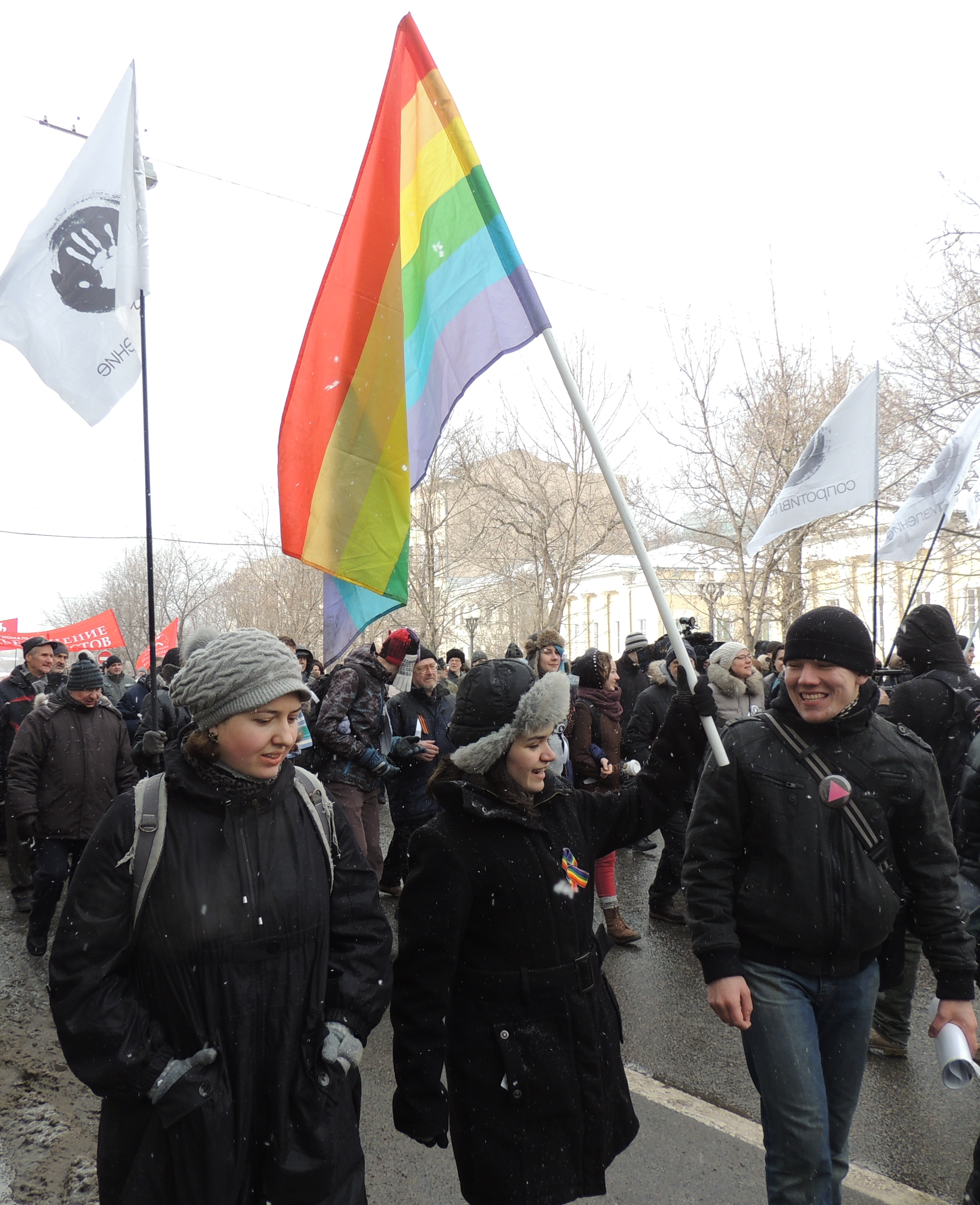
LGBTQ activists in Moscow, 2 March 2013

Opposition to the LGBTQ rights movement is very prevalent in Russia, including within the Kremlin. President Vladimir Putin enacted laws in 2012 which criminalised education about LGBTQ issues, calling it "gay propaganda". It banned telling minors that homosexuality was normal or natural. This was opposed by some nations with many members of the public in the U.S. and Western Europe calling for a boycott of the 2014 Winter Olympics in Sochi. However, President Putin assured that all athletes would be respected, regardless of their sexuality and in the event, no boycott occurred.

The law passed has been described as taking Russia's LGBTQ community "from being a stigmatized fringe group to full-blown enemies of the state", and has been described as a major contributor to a wave of anti-gay violence by several neo-Nazi organisations (such as Occupy Paedophilia), which target gay teens online and meet up with them, posting on YouTube their acts of assault against the LGBTQ teens, which have even resulted in the death of several LGBTQ teens in Russia, which are rarely investigated by the authorities, defining them as "civil movements fighting the sins of society".

=== Sweden ===
Sweden has seen increased opposition to LGBTQ rights through anti-gender campaigns. Scholars have documented how Sweden, despite its reputation as a gender-equal country, is increasingly affected by what has been termed "insidious de-democratization," a process in which small but cumulative political and discursive shifts erode liberal democratic norms by marginalizing already vulnerable groups such as trans people.

Anti-LGBTQ and anti-gender rhetoric in Sweden is promoted by a range of actors, including the far-right Sweden Democrats and Christian Democrats, who have opposed legal reforms strengthening transgender rights. These parties frame their opposition in terms of protecting women’s rights and Swedish values. At the same time, anti-gender views have also gained ground among some radical feminist groups that identify as “gender-critical.” One prominent example is the Swedish Women's Lobby (SWL), which in recent years has been criticized by scholars and civil society groups for adopting trans-exclusionary positions. In 2025, SWL launched the Women's Platform for Action International (WoPAI), an international network promoting "sex-based rights" and opposing what it calls a "pro-gender movement", a "queer agenda" and the concept of gender identity.

The increasing normalization of anti-gender discourse has also coincided with growing political violence and intimidation, particularly directed at trans advocates. This includes online harassment, threats, and public vilification. Researchers argue that such violence, both symbolic and physical, plays a central role in silencing dissent and undermining democratic participation.

=== United Kingdom ===
In 1988, the Conservative Party, who were in government at the time, enacted Section 28 which stated that local authorities must not "intentionally promote homosexuality or publish material with the intention of promoting homosexuality" and that maintained schools should not "promote the teaching [...] of the acceptability of homosexuality", describing families with gay parents as being in a "pretended family relationship". Research on the effect of suppressing information about sexuality awareness in schools showed a correspondence with increases in the level of homophobic bullying by peers, as well as increased incidence in depression and suicide amongst LGBTQ people trying to come to terms with their sexuality. In 1987, Thatcher also declared that "hard left education authorities and extremist teachers" were indoctrinating the nation by teaching the younger generation "political slogans", "anti-racist mathematics" and telling their pupils that they have an "inalienable right to be gay", rather than "taught to respect traditional moral values". She then went on to say that "all of those children are being cheated of a sound start in life—yes cheated!"

In 2003, despite opposition from socially liberal Conservatives such as later prime minister David Cameron, Section 28 was repealed by the Labour government under Tony Blair.

In June 2009, Cameron, whilst campaigning for the 2010 general election, formally apologised for his party introducing the law, stating that it was a mistake and had been offensive to gay people.

In 2013, same-sex marriage was legalised under Cameron's premiership (despite his government voting against it) which Cameron described as "an important step forward" and said that he thought that "it is right that gay people should be able to get married too".

As of 2010, the largest voice against LGBTQ equality in the UK came from the Church of England over the issue of same-sex marriage. Labour passed into law in 2005 the ability for same-sex couples to enter civil partnerships, but they could not take place in a church or be called a "marriage". The Church of England opposed the-then coalition Government's plans (this government came to an end in May 2015) to extend this to "full marriage rights."

The British National Party has shifted its platform from recriminalisation to an extension of section 28-style legislation, i.e. making it illegal to portray homosexuality positively in the media. In 1999, the Admiral Duncan pub, a gay bar in London's Soho, was targeted up as part of a terrorist campaign by a former National Socialist Movement and British National Party (BNP) member, David Copeland; three people were killed, and seventy maimed or injured by a nail bomb detonated in the pub.

=== United States ===
==== History ====
===== 1950s and 1960s =====
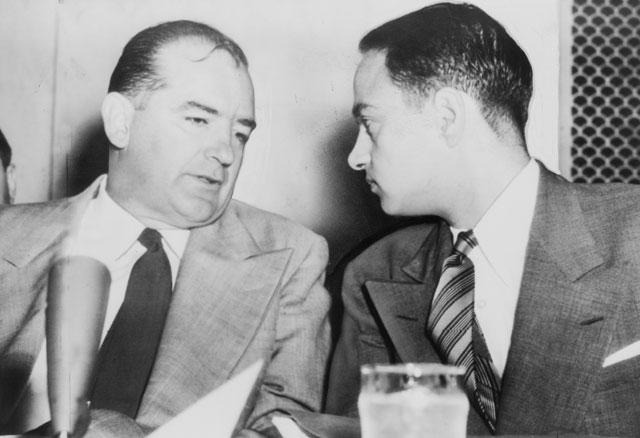
Joseph McCarthy and Roy Cohn, leaders of the Lavender scare

In the 1950s in the United States, open homosexuality was taboo. Legislatures in every state had passed laws against homosexual behavior well before this, most notably anti-sodomy laws. During the Cold War politicians frequently described homosexuals as "subversives" who undermined national security and patriotism, and described them as Communist sympathisers or a Communist Fifth column. During the Lavender Scare, Joseph McCarthy used accusations of homosexuality as a smear tactic. Senator Kenneth Wherry publicized fears that Joseph Stalin had obtained a list of closeted homosexuals in positions of power from Adolf Hitler, which he believed Stalin intended to use to blackmail these men into working against the U.S. for the Soviet regime. In the 1950 report produced by a Senate subcommittee titled "Employment of Homosexuals and Other Sex Perverts in Government" said that "the pervert is easy prey to the blackmailer... It is an accepted fact among intelligence agencies that espionage organizations the world over consider sex perverts who are in possession of or have access to confidential material to be prime targets where pressure can be exerted." Along with that security-based concern, the report found homosexuals unsuitable for government employment because "those who engage in overt acts of perversion lack the emotional stability of normal persons. In addition, there is an abundance of evidence to sustain the conclusion that indulgence in acts of sex perversion weakens the moral fiber of an individual to a degree that he is not suitable for a position of responsibility." McCarthy and Roy Cohn more often used the secrets of closeted gay American politicians as tools for blackmail than did foreign powers.

The modern roots of the Christian right's views on sexual matters were evident in the years 1950s–1960s, a period in which many conservative Christians in the United States viewed sexual promiscuity as not only excessive, but in fact as a threat to their ideal vision of the country.

===== 1970s and 1980s =====
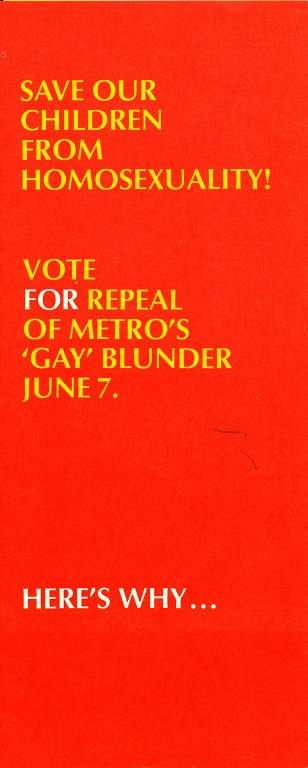
Brochure used by Save Our Children in 1977

Beginning in the 1970s, conservative Christian protests against promiscuity began to surface, largely as a reaction to the "permissive Sixties" and an emerging prominence of sexual rights arising from Roe v. Wade and the LGBTQ rights movement. The Christian right proceeded to make sexuality issues a priority political cause. Anita Bryant organized Save Our Children, a widespread campaign to oppose legislation prohibiting discrimination on the basis of sexual orientation in Miami-Dade County, Florida. The group argued that gay people were "recruiting" or "molesting children" in order to make them gay. Bryant infamously claimed that "As a mother, I know that homosexuals cannot biologically reproduce children; therefore, they must recruit our children," and also claimed that "If gays are granted rights, next we'll have to give rights to prostitutes and to people who sleep with St. Bernards and to nail biters." The Bryant campaign achieved success in repealing some city anti-discrimination laws, and proposed other citizen initiatives such as a failed California ballot question designed to ban gay people or those who supported LGBTQ rights from holding public teaching jobs. Bryant's campaign attracted widespread opposition and boycotts which put her out of business and destroyed her reputation.

From the late 1970s onwards, some conservative Christian organizations such as the Christian Broadcasting Network, Focus on the Family, Concerned Women for America, the American Family Association, and the Christian Coalition of America, along with right-wing Christian hate groups such as the Westboro Baptist Church, have been outspoken against LGBTQ rights. Late in 1979, a new religious revival among conservative Evangelical Protestants and Roman Catholics ushered in the Republican coalition politically aligned with the Christian right that would reign in the United States between the years 1970s and 1980s, becoming another obstacle for the progress of the LGBTQ rights movement.

During the HIV/AIDS epidemic of the 1980s, LGBTQ communities were further stigmatized as they became the focus of mass hysteria, suffered isolation and marginalization, and were targeted with extreme acts of violence. The Christian right champions itself as the "self-appointed conscience of American society". During the 1980s, the movement was largely dismissed by political pundits and mainstream religious leaders as "a collection of buffoonish has-beens". Later, it re-emerged, better organized and more focused, taking firm positions against abortion, pornography, sexual deviancy, and extreme feminism.

===== 1990s and 2000s =====
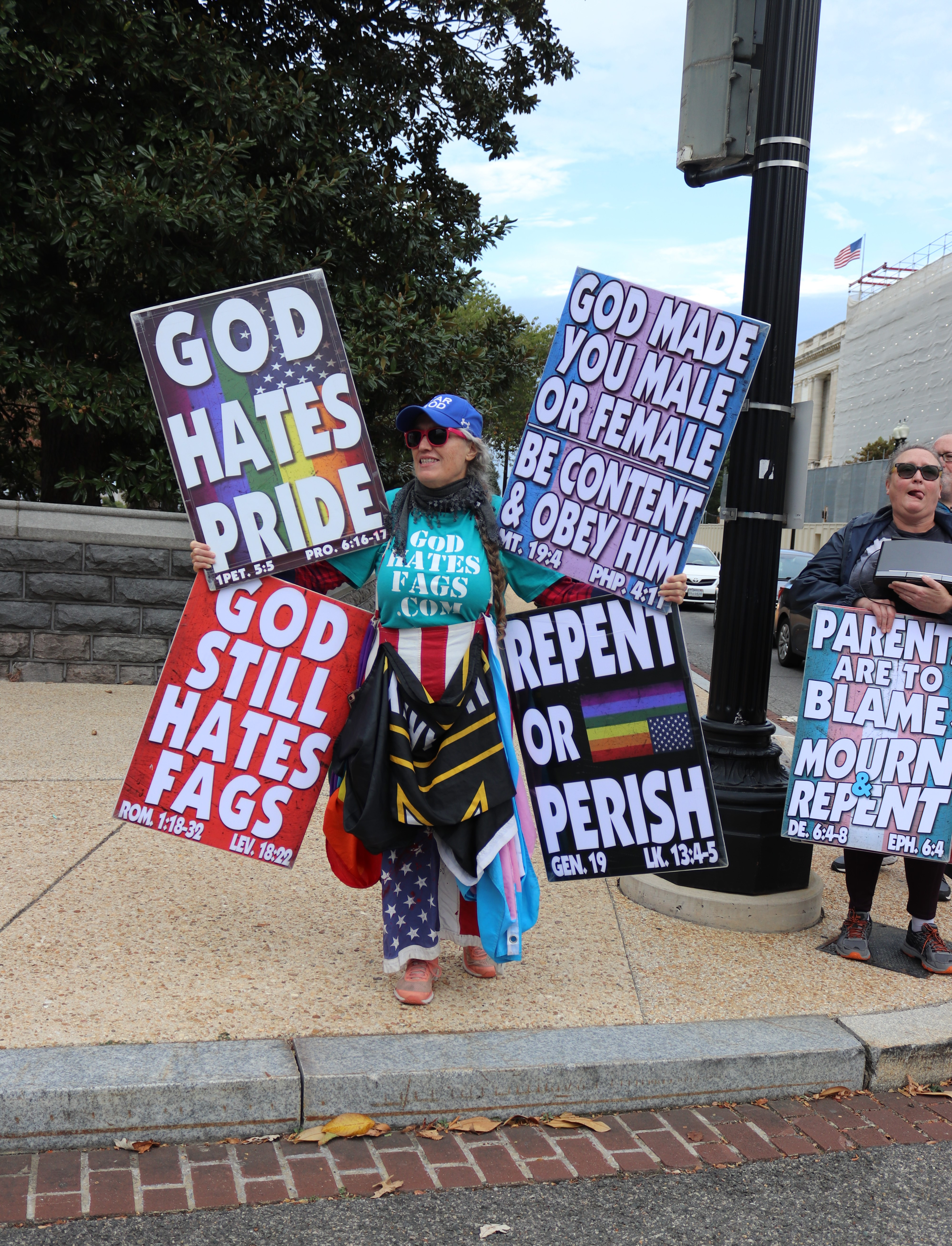
Homophobic Westboro Baptist Church protesters in Washington, D.C., 2019

Influential Christian right organizations were at the forefront of the anti-gay rights movement in the United States in the 1990s and 2000s, including Focus on the Family, Family Research Council, and the Family Research Institute. An important stratagem in Christian right anti-gay politics is in its rejection of "the edicts of a Big Brother" state, allowing it to profit from "a general feeling of discontent and demoralization with government". As a result, the Christian right has endorsed smaller government, restricting its ability to arbitrate in disputes regarding values and traditions. In this context, gay rights laws have come to symbolize the government's allegedly unconstitutional "[interference] with individual freedom".

The central tenets of Focus on the Family and similar organizations, such as the Family Research Council, emphasise issues such as abortion and the necessity of gender roles. A number of organizations, including the New Christian Right, "have in various ways rejected liberal America in favor of the regulation of pornography, anti-abortion legislation, the criminalization of homosexuality, and the virtues of faithfulness and loyalty in sexual partnerships", according to sociologist Bryan Turner.

===== 2010s and 2020s =====
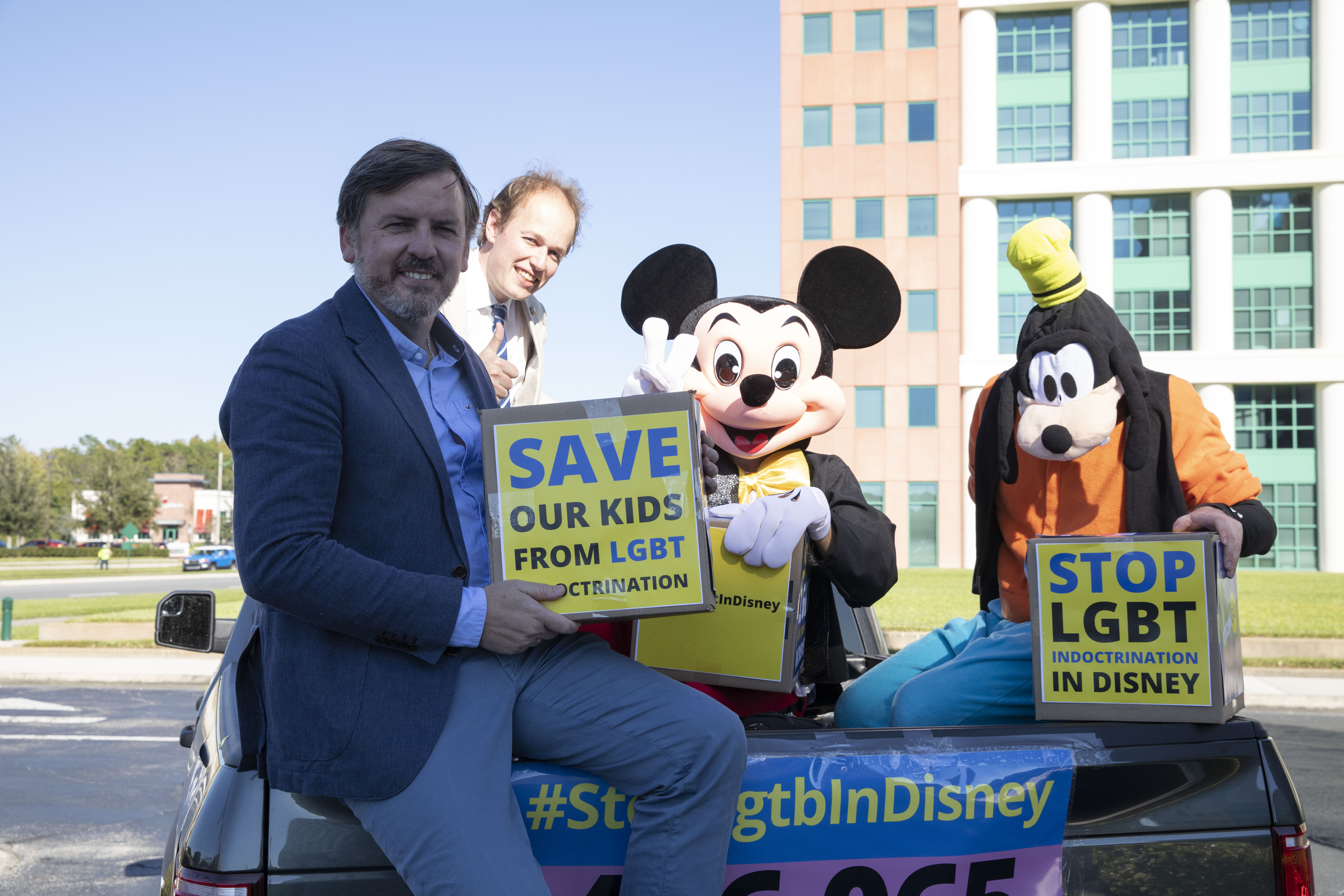
Men protesting outside Disney World in 2020 with a sign reading, "Save Our Kids from LGBT Indoctrination"

During the presidency of Donald Trump, some Christian conservatives refrained from engaging in debates about sexual morality. However, beginning in the early-2020s, an anti-LGBTQ movement occurred in the United States, heavily focused on transgender Americans. This conservative political backlash against LGBTQ rights included bathroom use restrictions, bans on gender transition, "don't say gay" laws, laws against drag performances, book bans, boycotts, and conspiracy theories around grooming.

==== U.S. public opinion ====
Public opinion has shifted towards increased acceptance of homosexuality and equal rights for gays and lesbians since the late 1970s. According to the Gallup poll, the percentage of Americans who think that same-sex relations between consenting adults should be legal increased from 43% in 1977 to 59% in 2007. In 1977, 56% of Americans thought that gay people should have equal rights in terms of job opportunities. As of 2007, that number has risen to 89%. In 1982, 34% thought that homosexuality should be considered "an acceptable alternative lifestyle". As of 2007, that number is 54%. In 1997, 27% of Americans thought that same-sex marriages should be legally valid. That number is 46% as of 2007. In 1977, 13% of Americans thought that sexual orientation is "something a person is born with"; as of 2007, that percentage increased to 42%. A poll conducted in 2013 showed a record high of 58% of the Americans supporting legal recognition for same-sex marriage. In April 2015, a Washington Post-ABC News poll showed that 61% of Americans supported same-sex marriage and a similar share were against state-by-state legalization.

Numerous studies have investigated the prevalence of acceptance and disapproval of homosexuality and have consistently found correlations with various demographic, psychological, and social variables. For example, studies (mainly conducted in the United States) have found that heterosexuals with positive attitudes towards homosexuality are more likely to be non-religious, politically liberal or moderate, young, female and have close personal contact with openly gay men and lesbians. (Note: Studies finding that heterosexual men usually exhibit more hostile attitudes toward gay men and lesbians than heterosexual women: Herek, G. M. (1994). Assessing heterosexuals' attitudes toward lesbians and gay men. In "B. Greene and G.M. Herek (Eds.) Psychological perspectives on lesbian and gay issues: Vol. 1 Lesbian and gay psychology: Theory, research, and clinical applications." Thousands Oaks, Ca: Sage.; Kite, M.E. (1984). Sex differences in attitudes toward homosexuals: A meta-analytic review. Journal of Homosexuality, 10 (1–2), 69–81.; Morin, S., & Garfinkle, E. (1978). Male homophobia. Journal of Social Issues, 34 (1), 29–47.; Thompson, E., Grisanti, C., & Pleck, J. (1985). Attitudes toward the male role and their correlates. Sex Roles, 13 (7/8), 413–427.; For other correlates, see: Larson et al. (1980) Heterosexuals' Attitudes Toward Homosexuality, The Journal of Sex Research, 16, 245–257; Herek, G. (1988), Heterosexuals' Attitudes Toward Lesbians and Gay Men, Journal of Sex Research, 25, 451–477; Kite, M.E., & Deaux, K., 1986. Attitudes toward homosexuality: Assessment and behavioral consequences. Basic and Applied Social Psychology, 7, 137–162; Haddock, G., Zanna, M. P., & Esses, V. M. (1993). Assessing the structure of prejudicial attitudes: The case of attitudes toward homosexuals. Journal of Personality and Social Psychology, 65, 1105–1118.; See also: Lewis, Gregory B., Black-White Differences in Attitudes toward Homosexuality and Gay Rights, Public Opinion Quarterly, Volume 67, Number 1, Pp. 59–78 They are also more likely to have positive attitudes towards other minority groups) and are less likely to support traditional gender roles.

==== United States Armed Forces ====
Homosexual activity was a reason for expulsion from the United States Armed Forces from their very beginning, although that was not codified until 1920. The "Don't ask, don't tell" (DADT) policy that began in 1994 barred the military from questioning people about their sexual orientation, but maintained the barring of service members who had come out. The barring of homosexuals was removed altogether in December 2010 by President Barack Obama.

Even before DADT was established, advocates for allowing gay people to openly serve pointed out that neither unit cohesion nor morale were affected when the UK admitted gay people into the military. A similar comparison has been made to the lack of negative consequences when African-Americans and women were admitted into the military.

==== Boy Scouts of America ====
The Boy Scouts of America now accepts gay and bisexual people in its organizations. Previously, there was an exclusion enforced commonly for Scoutmasters, but also for scouts in leadership positions. Their rationale was that homosexuality is immoral and that Scouts are expected to have certain moral standards and values, as the Scout Oath and Scout Law requires boys to be "morally straight". The Boy Scout organization did not view their policy as unjustly discriminatory, but instead defends their policy saying that, "Tolerance for diversity of values does not require abdication of one's own values".

In 2000 the United States Supreme Court ruled in Boy Scouts of America v. Dale that the Boy Scouts of America is a private organization, and as such can decide its own membership rules. There is still a movement to try to persuade the organization to change its policy or allow local chapters to decide for themselves.

In 2005, the U.S. Congress passed the Support Our Scouts Act of 2005 to exempt the BSA from anti-discrimination laws, to require the Department of Defense to support scouting Jamborees (thus rendering ineffective a Federal Court injunction prohibiting this as an unconstitutional establishment of religion in violation of the First Amendment) and to require state or local governments that receive Community Development Block Grant money from the Department of Housing and Urban Development to allow BSA to have meetings in their facilities or on their property.

The BSA historically has received much of its funding and support from religious groups noted for their opposition to the gay rights movement. Some BSA local councils found that United Way's, municipalities', school districts' and businesses' support and funding was reduced because of their adherence to the BSA's policy on sexual orientation. In order to continue receiving funding, local councils like New Jersey signed nondiscrimination agreements contrary to BSA National Council policy. Other outdoor-focused, youth-based organizations such as the 4-H club and Girl Scouts of the USA do not discriminate on the basis of sexual orientation.

In most countries where Boy Scouts organizations exist homosexuality is not regarded as incompatible with scout values, and gay members are not excluded from activities; this includes the United Kingdom, where scouting was founded by Baden-Powell.

In July 2015, the Boy Scouts' executive board voted to end the ban on adult leaders who are openly gay.

== See also ==
- Anti-Homosexuality Act, 2023 – Ugandan law
- Anti-LGBTQ rhetoric
- Antifeminism
- Anti-gender movement
- Biphobia
- Conversion therapy
- Culture war
- "Down-low", sexual subculture of Black men who identify as heterosexual but secretly have sex with other men
- "Drop the T", slogan coined to encourage LGBTQ organizations to stop support of transgender people
- Gay agenda
- Gay concentration camps in Chechnya
- Gay–straight alliance
- George Rekers
- Heteronormativity
- Heterosexism
- Homophile movement
- Homophobic propaganda
- Homosexual recruitment, a conspiracy theory alleging conversion efforts targeting heterosexuals
- Ivar Lovaas
- Lesbophobia
- LGBTQ people and Islam
- LGBTQ retirement issues in the United States
- List of organizations designated by the Southern Poverty Law Center as anti-LGBTQ hate groups
- List of U.S. ballot initiatives to repeal LGBTQ anti-discrimination laws
- Persecution of gay and bisexual men by the Islamic State
- Straight pride
- Straightwashing
- Transphobia
  - Discrimination against transgender men
  - Transmisandry
  - Transmisogynoir
  - Transphobic misogyny
- Karl Heinrich Ulrichs
- Violence against LGBTQ people
