= Åström =

Åström is a surname of Swedish origin. Notable people with the surname include:

- Alice Åström (born 1959), Swedish politician
- Anna Åström (born 1990), Swedish actress
- Emma Irene Åström (1847–1934), Finnish teacher
- Erik Åström (1902–1971), Finnish sprinter
- Gertrud Åström (born 1954), Swedish businesswoman
- Gunnar Åström (1904–1952), Finnish football player
- Hans Åström (born 1968), Swedish bandy player
- Hardy Åström (born 1951), Swedish ice hockey goaltender
- Henrik Åström (born 1980), Swedish composer and music producer
- Hjalmar Åström (1888–1957), Swedish lieutenant general
- Karin Åström (born 1953), Swedish politician
- Karl-Erik Åström (1924–1993), Swedish cross-country skier
- Karl Johan Åström (1934–2026), Swedish control theorist
- Kristofer Åström, Swedish singer-songwriter
- Maja Åström (born 1982), Swedish football player
- Nina Åström (born 1962), Finnish singer-songwriter
- Patrik Åström (born 1987), Swedish football player
- Paul Åström (1929–2008), Swedish archaeologist
- Peer Åström (born 1972), Swedish songwriter
- Sverker Åström (1915–2012), Swedish diplomat
- Ted Åström (born 1945), Swedish actor
