= Group 8 =

Group 8 may refer to:

- Group 8 (Sweden), a feminist movement in Sweden
- Group 8 element, a series of elements in the Periodic Table
- Group 8 Rugby League, a rugby league competition
- G8, or Group of 8, an inter-governmental political forum from 1997 until 2014
- NASA Astronaut Group 8, 1978
- Group VIII, former nomenclature for the noble gases
