= Anti-gender movement in Sweden =

Since the mid 2010s Sweden has increasingly seen the rise of anti-gender campaigns, part of a broader transnational movement that opposes gender equality, transgender rights and other LGBTQ rights, and feminist and queer scholarship. Notable organizations promoting anti-gender politics include both far-right parties such as the Sweden Democrats and gender-critical groups such as the Swedish Women's Lobby, with international projects including Women's Platform for Action International and the MOTERIS network. Feminist academics have described the rise of anti-gender politics in Sweden, encompassing both right-wing and "gender-critical" factions, as part of an "insidious de-democratization."

== Background ==
Anti-gender campaigns mobilize around the invented concept of "gender ideology," a term used pejoratively by anti-gender actors to delegitimize academic gender studies and the human rights of LGBTQ people and women.

The Report on violence and pathways to violence in anti-gender campaigns, published by the European Commission, noted that Sweden has seen a rise in anti-gender rhetoric since the mid 2010s. Gender studies scholars Karlberg, Korolczuk, and Sältenberg describe anti-gender politics in Sweden as part of a wider process of "insidious de-democratization," which they describe as a set of discourses and practices that erode liberal democracy by marginalizing already vulnerable groups; they further argue that "anti-gender politics in the country is inextricably linked with the use of political violence and the further normalization of exclusion."

Gender studies scholars Sältenberg, Fernández and Caravantes argue that in Sweden, "anti-gender actors' discourses are strongly based on femonationalism and the naturalization of gender equality, regarded as a core value attributed to the country and hegemonic forms of 'Swedishness,'" noting that anti-gender discourses target gender studies, gender pedagogy, and trans rights, but also Islam and the Muslim community. Korolczuk and Sältenberg argue that "the case of Sweden shows us that the shape that anti-gender initiatives take varies from country to country. Thus, we need to understand the complexity of opposition to the concept of gender and minority rights, and its relation to other forms of structural oppression, such as racism."

Media studies scholar Hugo Ekström argues that Swedish anti-transgender rhetoric, spread by far-right and allied YouTube channels, relies on a belief in a fixed, binary view of sex and portrays this as unquestionable truth. Claims about "protecting children" are used to justify hostility toward transgender people and to promote conspiracy theories linking them to paedophilia. Ekström shows that appeals to "science" and moral panic lend these ideas false legitimacy, turning prejudice into apparent "common sense." In Sweden, this rhetoric draws strength from the country's image of gender equality, twisting it to claim that progressive rights have "gone too far" and to normalise anti-trans and anti-gender attitudes in public debate.

In her cross-cultural study on prejudice against transgender people, social psychologist Jaime L. Napier highlights Sweden as the only sample in her research where women, not men, were more prejudiced toward transgender women, noting how prejudice against transgender people also exists among self-identified feminists. She cites Kajsa Ekis Ekman's anti-transgender stance as an example and possible explanation of this trend.

== Anti-gender actors ==
=== Right-wing political parties ===
Anti-gender rhetoric in Sweden is promoted by a range of actors, including the far-right Sweden Democrats and Christian Democrats, who have opposed legal reforms strengthening transgender rights. These parties frame their opposition in terms of protecting women’s rights and Swedish values.

=== Gender-critical groups ===
==== Swedish Women's Lobby ====
At the same time, anti-gender views have also gained ground among some radical feminist groups that identify as "gender-critical." One prominent example is the Swedish Women's Lobby (SWL), which in recent years has been criticized by scholars and civil society groups for adopting trans-exclusionary positions.

==== Women's Platform for Action International ====
In 2025, SWL launched the Women's Platform for Action International (WoPAI), an international anti-gender network promoting "sex-based rights" and opposing what it calls a "queer agenda," a "pro-gender movement" in academia and NGOs, and "non-legal and not agreed upon by the international community concepts of 'gender identity.'" In a joint statement, SWL and WoPAI opposed the inclusion of trans women—whom they referred to as "males who do not wish to be treated in law and practice as men"—in analyses of violence against women.

Observing the launch of Women's Platform for Action International in 2025, Andrea Cornwall discusses the launch as dedicated to promoting "sex-based rights" and as part of a broader anti-gender discourse coalition. She notes that self-described grassroots women's liberation movement activists find common cause with Christian anti-abortion activists in fighting "gender", stating that one activist at the WoPAI launch told her that it "was the power of shared anti-gender antipathy that enabled her to organise across political faultlines that might have sundered potential alliances in any other context."

Elena Crimaldi notes that "Sweden, previously highlighted as a pioneer of feminist and LGBTIQ rights policies, has seen the rise of TERF-aligned groups. The Swedish Women’s Lobby (SWL), established in 1997 as an umbrella organisation uniting 57 associations representing over 130,000 women and girls, now actively opposes the ‘pro-gender movement’. The SWL, which participated in the 2010 Krafttag mot våldtäkter campaign, this year launched the Women’s Platform for Action International, a far-right, anti-transgender association promoting ‘sex-based rights’."

==== MOTERIS Protecting the Civic Space of Women and Girls ====
In August 2025, SWL also founded the international anti-gender network "MOTERIS Protecting the Civic Space of Women and Girls", which states that it promotes "sex-based rights" and which includes other gender-critical and anti-gender organizations. MOTERIS states that it works for "material reality" and that "women's existence as a sex-based political class" is being denied by "pseudo-progressive currents." It portrays the criticism of anti-gender politics by academics, NGOs and governments as an infringement of the "civic space" of anti-trans groups, and includes such organizations as Southern Poverty Law Center-designated anti-trans hate group Women's Declaration International.

== Reception and analysis ==
Research shows that these anti-gender efforts in Sweden target not only legal rights but also knowledge production, including gender studies and intersectional feminist scholarship, which are often labeled as ideological or unscientific by critics. The opposition frequently draws on arguments about safeguarding "rationality" and "science" and sometimes mirrors narratives associated with international far-right and populist movements.

The increasing normalization of anti-gender discourse has also coincided with growing political violence and intimidation, particularly directed at trans advocates, feminist scholars, and racialized activists. This includes online harassment, threats, and public vilification. Researchers argue that such violence, both symbolic and physical, plays a central role in silencing dissent and undermining democratic participation.

Despite Sweden’s formal commitment to gender equality and LGBTQ rights, scholars argue that the adoption of exclusionary rhetoric and policy proposals, especially against trans people and migrants, reflects a deeper shift in how democracy and equality are understood and enacted.

In 2021, 943 priests and employees of the Church of Sweden condemned "trans-exclusionary feminism [that] uses rhetoric we recognize from radical right-wing Christian groups and right-wing populists," adding: "We mourn a rights movement that punches down. You, me, we, all of us, need a broad, solidarity-based feminism that fights restrictive gender norms."

In 2020, the Swedish magazine Ottar published an exposé on what it described as an "unholy alliance" of right-wing Christians and radical feminists working to undermine trans rights. The article reported that in 2018, the Swedish Women's Lobby invited the anti-trans group Genid to an internal training session, and it identified 2020 as the point when organized anti-trans mobilization gained momentum in Sweden. Daniel Poohl, publisher of Swedish anti-racist magazine Expo, wrote that "radical feminists, right-wing Christians, conspiracy theorists, and far-right extremists have found each other in an unholy alliance that has made transgender people the new target of the far right's hatred." Jon Voss argued in QX in 2023 that "the Sweden Democrats and the Swedish Women's Lobby sound frighteningly similar to Putin, Orbán, Erdoğan, Trump, and DeSantis in their ways of arguing by belittling transgender people."

Swedish journalist Göran Eriksson argued in Svenska Dagbladet that Sweden has become a weapon of the American far right, noting how Ron DeSantis considered the country a model for his anti-transgender policies. He highlighted an op-ed by the Swedish Women's Lobby's Tanja Olsson Blandy titled "Can women have a penis?" that promoted common anti-transgender talking points.
