= Swedish Women's Lobby =

Organization in Sweden

- Formation: 1997
- Type: Political advocacy
- Affiliations: Women's Platform for Action International, MOTERIS, European Women's Lobby
- Website: sverigeskvinnoorganisationer.se

The Swedish Women's Lobby (Swedish: Sveriges Kvinnoorganisationer; formerly Sveriges Kvinnolobby) (SWL) is a Swedish gender-critical organization. It describes itself as a non-partisan and non-denominational independent umbrella organization for the Swedish women’s movement. Since the late 2010s it has increasingly represented what academics describe as gender-critical, anti-gender and trans-exclusionary positions, and in 2025 it launched the international NGO Women's Platform for Action International (WoPAI) to promote "sex-based rights" and oppose what they call a "queer agenda," a "pro-gender movement" in academia and NGOs, and "non-legal and not agreed upon by the international community concepts of 'gender identity.'" WoPAI is described as a far-right anti-transgender organization. WoPAI is hosted by SWL and shares its address; SWL's secretary-general Susannah Sjöberg is also the inaugural secretary-general of WoPAI, while former SWL chair Gertrud Åström was its inaugural chair. In August 2025, SWL also founded the anti-gender network MOTERIS Protecting the Civic Space of Women and Girls, which states that it promotes "sex-based rights" and which includes other gender-critical and anti-gender organizations. MOTERIS states that it works for "material reality" and that "women’s existence as a sex-based political class" is being denied by "pseudo-progressive currents."

In a joint statement, SWL and WoPAI opposed the inclusion of trans women—whom they referred to as "males who do not wish to be treated in law and practice as men"—in analyses of violence against women. In May 2025, WoPAI board member Anna Kerr presented her lecture "Did Freemasonry have a role in the roots of the trans movement?," which promoted Masonic conspiracy theories. WoPAI said in September 2025 that "trans ideology has been a pernicious threat to women's safety and freedom," and WoPAI asserted in 2025 that "queer activists" are waging a "war on women," with "the direct participation of powerful industries, UN bodies, global governments and philanthropic corporations." The Report on violence and pathways to violence in anti-gender campaigns, published by the European Commission, identified several of SWL's member organizations as part of a growing anti-gender landscape in Sweden, and noted that Sweden has seen a rise of anti-gender rhetoric since the mid 2010s. Women's Declaration International, that is described by SPLC as a central node in an international "anti-LGBTQ+ pseudoscience network," is a member of both SWL itself and its international umbrella groups.

Gender studies scholars Karlberg, Korolczuk and Sältenberg situate SWL within the broader landscape of anti-gender politics in Sweden, arguing that the rise of gender-critical and anti-trans rhetoric, including that promoted by SWL, is part of a wider process of "insidious de-democratization," which they describe as a set of discourses and practices that erode liberal democracy by marginalizing already vulnerable groups. In 2020, the magazine Ottar published an exposé on what it described as an "unholy alliance" of right-wing Christians and radical feminists working to undermine trans rights. The article reported that in 2018, SWL had worked with the anti-trans group Genid, and it identified 2020 as the point when organized anti-trans mobilization gained momentum in Sweden. Daniel Poohl, publisher of Swedish anti-racist magazine Expo, wrote that "radical feminists, right-wing Christians, conspiracy theorists, and far-right extremists have found each other in an unholy alliance that has made transgender people the new target of the far right's hatred," while nearly a thousand priests of the Church of Sweden condemned trans-exclusionary radical feminism as indistinguishable from the far right. Jon Voss argued in QX in 2023 that "the Sweden Democrats and the Swedish Women's Lobby sound frighteningly similar to Putin, Orbán, Erdoğan, Trump, and DeSantis in their ways of arguing by belittling transgender people."

== History ==
Originally named Samverkansforum för Kvinnor i Sverige (English: Forum for the Cooperation of Women in Sweden), the SWL was founded in 1997, based on the model of the European Women's Lobby (EWL) on the EU level.

The SWL’s work in based on the Convention on the Elimination of All Forms of Discrimination Against Women (CEDAW), the Beijing Declaration and Sweden’s national gender equality goals. The lobby gathers 57 member organizations with the mutual aim to achieve women’s full human rights and a gender equal society, and is the Swedish national coordination of the European Women’s Lobby.

The SWL annually analyzes the state budget bill, as well as local and regional budgets, from a gender equality perspective. It conveys the network Lön hela dagen for gender equal pay, and runs the initiative Reklamera against sexist advertising. The SWL has an abolitionist stance on all forms of trafficking in women, meaning that it advocates the abolition of prostitution, pornography and gestational surrogacy.

Every year, the SWL organizes Forum Jämställdhet, Sweden’s largest gender equality conference. The SWL has consultative status at the United Nations Economic and Social Council, and annually represents its member organizations at the United Nations Commission on the Status of Women.

Susannah Sjöberg became secretary-general in 2025.

== Views on transgender people ==
SWL's views on transgender people have evolved significantly. A 2015 report on their website, that offered guidance for feminist organizing, emphasized the importance of actively working against cissexism and ensuring inclusion of trans and queer people. It pointed out that individuals who do not conform to the binary gender norm have long struggled to find space within the feminist movement, and that it is essential to combat both the discrimination they face and the ignorance that often underlies it. The report defined "not recognizing other gender identities or gender expressions than man and woman, or not taking transgender people's gender identity or gender expression seriously" as a form of transphobia. In 2015, SWL was among five organizations that called for public funding to be withheld from religious communities that allow "discrimination against women, homophobia, transphobia or gender apartheid."

Since the late 2010s, scholars and activists in Sweden have increasingly noted SWL’s turn toward gender-critical positions and its adoption of trans-exclusionary views and policies. In 2018, thirteen Swedish gender studies academics criticized SWL for its trans-exclusionary positions, particularly its opposition to proposed legal reforms intended to improve the lives of transgender people. Writing in Feministiskt Perspektiv, the scholars accused SWL of spreading misinformation and reproducing a binary, heteronormative, and trans-exclusionary conception of gender. They warned that SWL’s rhetoric not only marginalized trans and nonbinary people, but also distorted the meaning of feminist and intersectional equality work in Sweden. They called on SWL to adopt a more solidaristic approach and to engage seriously with up-to-date knowledge on trans issues, rather than echoing misleading narratives associated with broader anti-trans discourse.

A turning point came in 2019, when SWL denied board candidacy to Signe Krantz, a 20-year-old transgender woman representing the member organization Maktsalongen. SWL conducted an unauthorized inquiry into her legal gender, sparking outrage from civil society and the National Council of Swedish Children and Youth Organisations (LSU). Maktsalongen withdrew in protest, and LSU condemned SWL’s actions as "offensive" and "directly transphobic" in an open letter. In 2021, 943 priests and employees of the Church of Sweden condemned "trans-exclusionary feminism [that] uses rhetoric we recognize from radical right-wing Christian groups and right-wing populists," adding: "We mourn a rights movement that punches down. You, me, we, all of us, need a broad, solidarity-based feminism that fights restrictive gender norms."

In 2020, gender studies scholars Alm and Engebretsen highlighted SWL's promotion of gender-critical ideas as part of what they described as "a key issue in the current political and scholarly landscape (...) the growing convergence, and sometimes conscious alliances, between 'gender-critical' feminists (sometimes known as TERFs – Trans-Exclusionary Radical Feminists), religious and social conservatives, as well as right-wing politics and even neo-Nazi and fascist movements." In a talk to Women's Declaration International (WDI) in 2020, WDI's Swedish country contact said WDI and the Swedish Women's Lobby were the main organizations opposing gender self-determination in Sweden, and that "the Swedish Women's Lobby had a really big loss of organizations" that left the organization as a result of disagreement in the definition of feminism. In 2024 SWL opposed the Gender Recognition Act, aligning with the Sweden Democrats and Christian Democrats. Gender studies scholars Michal Grahn and Malin Holm argued that SWL’s claims that the Gender Recognition Act would endanger "women’s rights" and allow "men" to access "women-only spaces" closely mirrored the "threat to women" narratives employed in anti-trans rhetoric across other national contexts. In 2024, SWL accused "progressive parties and movements" of working against women. Gender studies scholars Karlberg, Korolczuk and Sältenberg argued that the rise of gender-critical and anti-trans rhetoric in Sweden, including that promoted by SWL, is part of a broader process of "insidious de-democratization," which they describe as a set of discourses and practices that erode liberal democracy by marginalizing already vulnerable groups. This shift aligns with what Claire House has identified as a broader international trend beginning in the mid-2010s, where (radical) feminist actors increasingly participate in anti-gender and regressive politics, often with particularly harmful consequences for trans rights, a trend she illustrates, in part, by referencing Alm and Engebretsen’s discussion of developments in Sweden and the case of SWL.

In 2020, the Swedish magazine Ottar published an exposé on what it described as an "unholy alliance" of right-wing Christians and radical feminists working to undermine trans rights. The article reported that in 2018, the Swedish Women's Lobby invited the anti-trans group Genid to an internal training session, and it identified 2020 as the point when organized anti-trans mobilization gained momentum in Sweden. Mathias Wåg, a Swedish journalist who covers the far right, said that "it is important to highlight the role the Swedish Women's Lobby plays in international anti-trans organizing." Daniel Poohl, publisher of Swedish anti-racist magazine Expo, pointed out that “radical feminists, right-wing Christians, conspiracy theorists, and far-right extremists have found each other in an unholy alliance that has made transgender people the new target of the far right's hatred.”

In her book Gender Ideology, Social Contagion, and the Making of a Transgender Generation, gender-critical writer Dianna Kenny lists the Swedish Women's Lobby as a group opposing gender-affirming care alongside Women's Declaration International, Moms for Liberty, Gays Against Groomers, Genspect, Sex Matters, and Transgender Trend.

In 2025, SWL launched an international umbrella organization, the Women's Platform for Action International (WoPAI), which states that it promotes "sex-based rights" and opposes what it calls a "pro-gender movement" in academia and NGOs, "large civil society organizations that claim to be feminist" and "queer, postmodern, or neoliberal agendas of liberal and leftist origin" as well as "non-legal and not agreed upon by the international community concepts of 'gender identity'". It brings together groups including Women's Declaration International, whose Swedish branch XXantippas Vrede is also a member of SWL. WoPAI is described as a far-right anti-transgender organization. SWL's secretary-general Susannah Sjöberg is the inaugural secretary-general of WoPAI, while former SWL chair Gertrud Åström was its inaugural chair. WoPAI shares SWL's address and lists Gertrud Åström, Anna Zobnina, and Susannah Sjöberg as its legal representatives as of 2025. WoPAI's first action was an open letter of support for Reem Alsalem in response to the criticism of her by many women's organizations, that WoPAI claimed was a "campaign [...] supported by powerful foundations such as Gates, Open Society and Ford." The organization has also voiced its support for a recent UK court ruling that defines women strictly as biological females, stating, "The UK Supreme Court knows what a woman is," and urging other countries to follow suit. In May 2025, WoPAI board member Anna Kerr presented her lecture "Did Freemasonry have a role in the roots of the trans movement?," which promoted Masonic conspiracy theories. A panel organized by WoPAI at the gender-critical FiLiA conference in 2025 promotes the claim that "queer activists" are waging a "war on women," with "the direct participation of powerful industries, UN bodies, global governments and philanthropic corporations." Speakers include Susan Smith and other gender-critical activists.

Observing the launch of Women's Platform for Action International in 2025, Andrea Cornwall discusses the launch as dedicated to promoting "sex-based rights" and as part of a broader anti-gender discourse coalition. She notes that self-described grassroots women's liberation movement activists find common cause with Christian anti-abortion activists in fighting "gender", stating that one activist at the WoPAI launch told her that it "was the power of shared anti-gender antipathy that enabled her to organise across political faultlines that might have sundered potential alliances in any other context."

Elena Crimaldi argued in 2025 that "Sweden, previously highlighted as a pioneer of feminist and LGBTIQ rights policies, has seen the rise of TERF-aligned groups. The Swedish Women’s Lobby (SWL) [...] now actively opposes the ‘pro-gender movement’. The SWL [...] this year launched the Women’s Platform for Action International, a far-right, anti-transgender association promoting ‘sex-based rights’."

Göran Eriksson argued in Svenska Dagbladet that Sweden has become a weapon of the American far right, noting how Ron DeSantis considered the country a model for his anti-transgender policies. He highlighted an op-ed by SWL's Tanja Olsson Blandy titled "Can women have a penis?" that promoted common anti-transgender talking points.

In July 2025, SWL together with WoPAI and the European Network of Migrant Women, issued a joint statement in support of Reem Alsalem and her report "Sex-based violence against women and girls," amid strong criticism of the report from international human rights groups such as Amnesty. The report called on states to "ensure that the terms 'women' and 'girls' are only used to describe biological females and that such a meaning is recognised in law," referred to trans women as "males who identify as women or girls" and called for a ban on legal and social gender transition for children. SWL and WoPAI referred to trans women as "males who do not wish to be treated in law and practice as men" and opposed their inclusion in analyses of violence against women, accused states and UN agencies of "redefining [women] out of legal existence," called women a "sex class," and denounced "exclusion, harassment, and professional retaliation" faced by those "who advocate for [...] sex-based rights," whom they said are met with "institutional power and public vilification." In September 2025 WoPAI said "trans ideology has been a pernicious threat to women's safety and freedom."

In 2025, feminist lawyer and humanitarian Hanna Gunnarsson wrote in Feministiskt Perspektiv that SWL was showing its "true colors" in its opposition to inclusive language in abortion law and that its trans-exclusionary rhetoric echoed "the right-wing movement that is currently driving a global offensive against trans people's rights." She argued that in this situation it was "deeply problematic" for SWL to exclude trans people instead of defending equal access to healthcare and protection. Gunnarsson asked whether all of SWL's member organizations supported SWL's "transphobic line," and said Sweden needed a feminist movement that stands up for both women's rights and trans rights, while opposing far-right extremism. Jon Voss argued in QX in 2023 that "the Sweden Democrats and the Swedish Women's Lobby sound frighteningly similar to Putin, Orbán, Erdoğan, Trump, and DeSantis in their ways of arguing by belittling transgender people."

Several women's shelters in Sweden have left the umbrella organization Unizon, affiliated with SWL, due to its anti-trans stance. In 2017 several women's shelters formed a new umbrella organization in Sweden, United Shelters, that unites Sweden's trans-inclusive girls' and youth shelters. This organization stands in opposition to SWL's members and their anti-trans stance.

The Report on violence and pathways to violence in anti-gender campaigns, published by the European Commission and part of the EU-funded research project Co-Creating Inclusive Intersectional Democratic Spaces Across Europe, discussed several of SWL's member organizations as part of an anti-gender landscape in Sweden, noting that Sweden has seen "a gradual rise in anti-gender discourses between 2015 and 2023," and that also "self-described 'gender-critical feminists'" such as WDI and Women's Rights Watch challenge feminist expertise and engage in attacks on gender studies and scholars.

In August 2025, SWL also founded the international anti-gender network "MOTERIS Protecting the Civic Space of Women and Girls", which states that it promotes "sex-based rights" and which includes other gender-critical and anti-gender organizations. MOTERIS states that it works for "material reality" and that "women's existence as a sex-based political class" is being denied by "pseudo-progressive currents." It portrays the criticism of anti-gender politics by academics, NGOs and governments as an infringement of the "civic space" of anti-trans groups, and includes such organizations as Southern Poverty Law Center-designated anti-trans hate group Women's Declaration International.

== Presidents ==
- Gunvor Ngarambe 1997–2009
- Gertrud Åström 2009–2015
- Clara Berglund 2015–2016
- Anna Giotas Sandquist 2016–2022
- Susannah Sjöberg 2022–2024
- Hanna Carlsson Kota 2025–

== See also ==
- Anti-gender movement in Sweden
- Norwegian Women's Lobby
