= SCAA =

SCAA may refer to:

- Scotland's Charity Air Ambulance
- Somali Civil Aviation Authority
- South China Athletic Association, an athletic club in Hong Kong
- The Specialty Coffee Association of America
- The Swedish Committee Against Antisemitism
- Civil Aviation Administration (Sweden)
