= Sofia Ahlbom =

Swedish artist (1803–1868)

Sofia Carolina Ahlbom
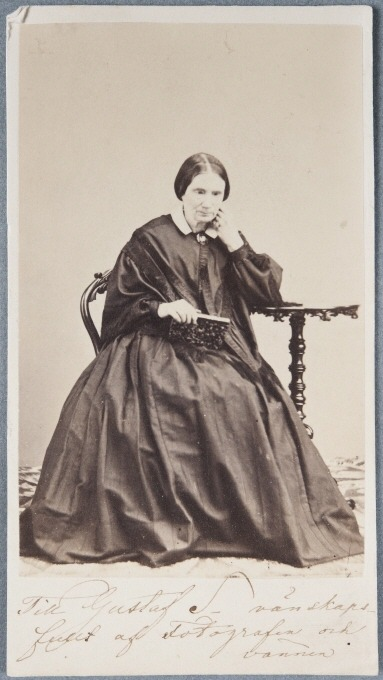
- Born: 25 November 1803; Västerås, Sweden
- Died: 8 June 1868 (aged 64); Stockholm, Sweden
- Known for: Engraving, Lithography, Photography, Writing, Drawing

Sofia Carolina Ahlbom (25 November 1803 – 8 June 1868) was a Swedish drawing artist, engraver, lithographer, photographer, map maker, writer, poet and feminist.

== Life ==
Sofia Ahlbom was born in Västerås, the daughter of a goldsmith. She displayed an early talent in drawing as a child, and was tutored by the engraver Grandel in first drawing and later in engraving. After the death of her father in 1822, she and her sister Gustafva Ahlbom founded and managed a girls' school to support themselves and their mother. In parallel, she made engravings by commission for with clients among the city goldsmiths. A rich female benefactor admired her talent and advised her to move to the capital.

In 1832, Sofia Ahlbom moved to Stockholm with her mother and sister, where she was able to support herself and her family solely as a professional artist: she never married, but lived with her mother and sister her entire life. She was described as a vivid personality with a practical and effective view on life: "A more bright look upon life and its circumstances, alongside a clearer mind and a more sensible head than that of mamsell Ahlbom, would be hard to find. She is, when it comes to business, so practical, that no male could be more so." She died in Stockholm, aged 64.

=== Engraver ===
Sofia Ahlbom was first known most for her engravings in copper, silver and gold. From 1842 to 1843, she was active in Paris, where she performed several stone engravings for the artist Jacob. Eventually, she also added Lithography to her field of expertise. She was able to make several trips abroad to study the art work in which she specialized.

=== Photographer ===
Sofia Ahlbom was also active as a professional photographer. In 1864, it is mentioned that she had been a successful photographer for several years prior, but it does not mentioned the exact year when she debuted as such.

=== Map maker ===
Sofia Ahlbom was employed as a map maker by the Navigationsskolan (University of Navigation) in Stockholm. She performed the inscriptions for the medals of Stockholms Slöjdskola (Stockholm Arts and Crafts School) and the Krigsakademien vid Karlberg (War Academy in Karlberg). She made the inscriptions for the heraldry book of the Swedish House of Lords (1861–64).

=== Writer ===
Sofia Ahlbom was also active as a writer, and produced publications in both poetry and prose. Described as a very learned autodidact, she was well considered in literary circles. Fredrika Bremer mentioned Sofia Ahlbom with respect in Livet i gamla världen (1862).

=== Social issues ===
Sofia Ahlbom also engaged herself in political issues. During the 1850s, one of the most debated issues regarding women's rights was the establishment of a retirement support system for professional female teachers, supported by the government. This was realized by the initiative of Josefina Deland by the Svenska lärarinnors pensionsförening (The Pension Fond for Female Teachers), in 1855, but the project was in great risk of never being realized because of the incompetence of the people responsible for it. Sofia Ahlbom succeeded Deland as secretary of the organisation after it had been approved by the government, a post she kept during the period of 1859–64. She was credited with having given it a firm organisation which saved the project from being disbanded.
