= Bilan Osman =

Swedish journalist

Bilan Osman (born 1992) is a Swedish journalist, opinion columnist and anti-racism activist.

== Early life and education ==
She was born in Gothenburg to parents from Somalia, a chemistry professor and an activist, and raised in Partille. Her paternal grandfather, Nor Osman, was a poet. She studied multimedia journalism at Bona Folk High School in Motala.

== Career ==
Osman has been a columnist at the newspapers Svenska Dagbladet (2018–2019) and Expressen, and also written opinion articles for other Swedish publications, including the magazine Opulens. For eight years beginning in 2013, her primary work was as a travelling educator for the anti-racism Expo foundation. She then joined the Islamic Ibn Rushd Study Association.

She has contributed to the anthologies Av oss blev det aldrig några riktiga damer, Svart kvinna (2015) Rummet (2015) and En annan historia (2017).

== Activism ==
In 2013, Osman was one of five co-signatories of an open letter in Aftonbladet urging Muslim women in Sweden to veil themselves in solidarity with a pregnant woman who was attacked in Stockholm by a man who objected to her hijab. She stated at the time that the group wanted to normalise the hijab in Sweden.

Educating people about and combatting racism is a major focus for Osman. She has written for the group anti-racist blog Inte rasist, men ... ('Not racist, but ...). In response to the murder of George Floyd and the Black Lives Matter movement in the US, Osman said that she sought to "start a conversation about whiteness" in Sweden. She covers right-wing extremism and has been accused of left-wing extremism; in early 2024 a Facebook post in which she expressed exasperation with white people led to criticism.

== Honors ==
In 2014 Osman was the recipient of the annual ELSA Award of the Swedish Committee Against Antisemitism, which is given to "individuals or groups who, via social media or in other ways, counteract anti-Semitism and other types of prejudice". In 2020 she was one of four nominees for the "Rising Star" award of the Swedish Magazine Publishers Association.
