= Josefina Deland =

Swedish feminist and writer

Josefina (Josephine) Deland (Stockholm, 1 October 1814 – Paris, 8 March 1890), was a Swedish feminist, writer and French teacher. She founded Svenska lärarinnors pensionsförening (Society for Retired Female Teachers), where she served as chairperson from its foundation in 1855 to 1859.

== Life ==
Deland was the daughter of the ballet dancer Louis Deland and the actress Maria Deland. Her father was partially French speaking, and she herself visited France during her upbringing, and was a French teacher in Stockholm in the 1840s and -50s. She published a book about the French language in 1839.

Deland was a feminist, and became a pioneer as a women's rights activist in Sweden at a point when no women's movement was organized in Sweden, apart from the isolated example of Sophie Sager. In 1852, she raised a public debate about the fact that the state did not provide any pension for retired female teachers and governesses, who consequently often ended up at the poor house after retirement. In 1855, the stately retirement fund Svenska lärarinnors pensionsförening was created thanks to her efforts. Her initial demand that the society was to be organised by women, as well as what was perceived as her "aggressive" behavior, was ridiculed by the media, and the debate was long remembered with her words: "No Gentlemen! No Gentlemen!". She was described by a contemporary as a: "Voluptuously curvy shaped lady, whose masculine behavior would have made a revolting impression, had it not been softened somewhat by the golden shine of her hair and the bright play of her eyes".

In 1859, Deland left Sweden for France. She was succeeded as chairperson of the Svenska lärarinnors pensionsförening by Sofia Ahlbom.

The same year, a comedy play by August Säfström with the title Mamsell Garibaldi eller Inga herrar, inga herrar! (Mamsell Garibaldi or No Gentlemen! No Gentlemen!) had its premier at the Humlegård Theater in Stockholm, caricaturing Josefina Deland.
