= Andreas Rosenlund =

Peter Andreas Rosenlund (born April 13, 1967) is a Swedish journalist and communication manager. He is best known as a co-founders, and former editor (1996), of anti-racist magazine Expo. He has also been working at the pharmacy monopoly Apoteket as press officer. Since 2009, he has been information manager at the pharmacy chain Kronans Droghandel.

Andreas Rosenlund has a background in the Left Party's youth wing Young Left, and was a contributor to its publication sv:Röd Press.
