= Swedish Committee Against Antisemitism =

The Swedish Committee Against Antisemitism (SCAA) (Swedish: Svenska kommittén mot antisemitism, SKMA) is a politically and religiously independent organization that works to spread knowledge about, and counteract, antisemitism and other forms of racism. The SCAA continuously monitors public debate and the media in order to report on and challenge antisemitic and racist commentary. Its blog, Facebook page, Twitter account and newsletter are sources of information on contemporary antisemitism.

SCAA also works through education and advocacy, providing information, expert lecturers and teaching resources for use by teachers, students, the media, political organisations and other interested parties.

Since the early 1990s, SCAA has organised regular training courses on antisemitism and other forms of racism, as well as on Nazism and the Holocaust. These courses draw together a number of Sweden's leading researchers, experts and educators in the field.

SCAA also organises study trips to Poland, Ukraine and the Baltic countries for those looking to deepen their knowledge about the Holocaust.

To date, thousands of teachers, youth leaders, politicians, journalists and students have participated in SCAA's extensive and nationwide training courses and seminars.

Each year, SCAA organizes memorial services to commemorate Holocaust Memorial Day on 27 January (the anniversary of Auschwitz's liberation) as well as the November Pogroms in Nazi Germany (Kristallnacht) that occurred on 9 November 1938.

The ELSA Prize is an annual award that was instituted by SCAA to highlight the efforts of young people who, via social media or other forms of activism, have campaigned against antisemitism and other forms of prejudice. The ELSA Prize consists of a diploma and the sum of 20 000 SEK and is awarded in conjunction with the annual memorial service commemorating the November Pogroms.

== History ==
The SCAA was formed in 1983 in the wake of the surge of antisemitism that occurred in the early 1980s.

During the late 1980s, SCAA disclosed anti-Jewish propaganda spread by the community radio station Radio Islam. SCAA's report to Sweden's Attorney General resulted in charges being brought against Radio Islam's controller, who was later convicted of several counts of inciting race hate. Since 1996, Radio Islam has been spreading hatred of Jews through the internet with almost the same antisemitic message as before, something that SCAA has many times drawn attention to.

In the 1990s, Sweden experienced a stark antisemitic surge in connection with the increase in extremist far-right activity. Through advocacy, training and reports, SCAA highlighted the proliferation of Holocaust-denial propaganda and the dissemination of racist white power music.

SCAA played an important role in the implementation of the Government's Living History information campaign (1997–2003), and today continues to works closely with the governmental Living History Forum.

In recent years, antisemitism has become more visible both in Europe and globally; a development that has also left its mark on Sweden. Through its articles, newsletters and training seminars, SCAA continues to highlight and combat anti-Jewish hate crimes and antisemitic propaganda.

== Awards ==
The organization annually gives out the ELSA Award, for "individuals or groups who, via social media or in other ways, counteract anti-Semitism and other types of prejudice". In 2014, the award went to journalist Bilan Osman.
