= Hardy Åström =

Swedish ice hockey player

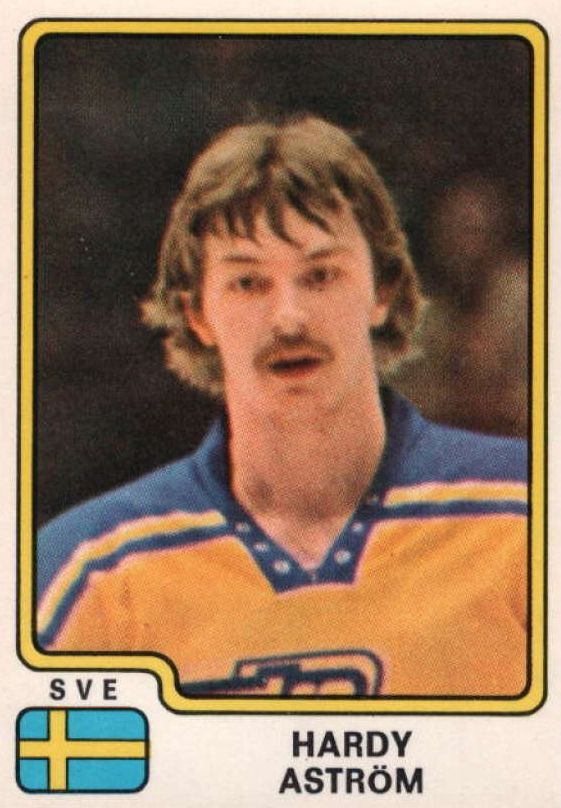
- Born: 29 March 1951 (age 75) Luleå, Sweden
- Height: 6 ft 0 in (183 cm)
- Weight: 170 lb (77 kg; 12 st 2 lb)
- Position: Goaltender
- Caught: Left
- Played for: Skellefteå AIK; New York Rangers; Colorado Rockies; Modo AIK; Södertälje SK
- NHL draft: Undrafted
- Playing career: 1974–1986

Ray Hardy Åström (born 29 March 1951 in Luleå, Sweden) is a retired Swedish professional ice hockey goaltender who played three seasons in the National Hockey League (NHL) for the New York Rangers and Colorado Rockies.

== Playing career ==
Åström was the first European goaltender to start an NHL game, when he played for the Rangers against the Montreal Canadiens on February 25, 1978. Åström played brilliantly in the Rangers' 6-3 win, which also stopped Montreal's 28-game unbeaten streak.

Hardy Åström also represented Sweden in the 1976 Canada Cup and the 1977 World Championships as one of Sweden's top goalies.

== Career statistics ==
=== Regular season and playoffs ===
| | | | Regular season | | | | | | | | | Playoffs |
| Season | Team | League | GP | W | L | T | MIN | GA | SO | GAA | SV% | GP | W | L | MIN | GA | SO | GAA | SV% |
|---|---|---|---|---|---|---|---|---|---|---|---|---|---|---|---|---|---|---|---|
| 1974–75 | Skellefteå AIK | SWE | 30 | — | — | — | 1800 | 96 | 0 | 3.20 | .883 | 5 | — | — | 307 | 19 | — | 3.71 | .881 |
| 1975–76 | Skellefteå AIK | SWE | 36 | — | — | — | 2160 | 149 | 1 | 4.14 | .876 | 3 | — | — | — | — | — | 8.85 | .785 |
| 1976–77 | Skellefteå AIK | SWE | 35 | — | — | — | 2092 | 142 | 0 | 4.07 | .862 | — | — | — | — | — | — | — | — |
| 1977–78 | New York Rangers | NHL | 4 | 2 | 2 | 0 | 240 | 14 | 0 | 3.50 | .887 | — | — | — | — | — | — | — | — |
| 1977–78 | New Haven Nighthawks | AHL | 27 | 17 | 5 | 3 | 1572 | 69 | 5 | 2.63 | .913 | — | — | — | — | — | — | — | — |
| 1978–79 | Skellefteå AIK | SWE | 26 | — | — | — | 1515 | 101 | 0 | 4.00 | .870 | — | — | — | — | — | — | — | — |
| 1979–80 | Colorado Rockies | NHL | 49 | 9 | 27 | 6 | 2566 | 161 | 0 | 3.77 | .870 | — | — | — | — | — | — | — | — |
| 1980–81 | Colorado Rockies | NHL | 30 | 6 | 15 | 6 | 1639 | 103 | 0 | 3.77 | .869 | — | — | — | — | — | — | — | — |
| 1980–81 | Fort Worth Texans | CHL | 7 | 1 | 5 | 0 | 345 | 21 | 0 | 3.65 | .881 | 1 | 0 | 0 | 20 | 3 | 0 | 9.00 | — |
| 1981–82 | Oklahoma City Stars | CHL | 35 | 12 | 18 | 1 | 1911 | 154 | 0 | 4.84 | .843 | 2 | 0 | 1 | 61 | 8 | 0 | 7.87 | — |
| 1982–83 | Örebro IK | Div.1 | — | — | — | — | — | — | — | — | — | — | — | — | — | — | — | — | — |
| 1983–84 | MODO | SWE | 36 | — | — | — | — | 39 | — | 2.16 | .872 | — | — | — | — | — | — | — | — |
| 1984–85 | Södertälje SK | SWE | 27 | — | — | — | 1508 | 85 | 3 | 3.38 | .875 | 8 | 5 | 3 | 495 | 26 | 1 | 3.15 | .907 |
| 1985–86 | Södertälje SK | SWE | 28 | — | — | — | 1650 | 87 | 0 | 3.16 | .887 | 7 | 4 | 3 | 420 | 23 | 0 | 3.29 | .895 |
| NHL totals | | | 83 | 17 | 44 | 12 | 4445 | 278 | 0 | 3.75 | .871 | — | — | — | — | — | — | — | — |

=== International ===
| Year | Team | Event | GP | W | L | T | MIN | GA | SO | GAA | SV% |
|---|---|---|---|---|---|---|---|---|---|---|---|
| 1976 | Sweden | CC | 4 | 1 | 2 | 1 | 240 | 17 | 0 | 4.00 | 8.50 |
| 1978 | Sweden | WC | 4 | — | — | — | 208 | 15 | — | 4.33 | — |
| Senior totals | | | 8 | — | — | — | 448 | 32 | — | 4.29 | — |
