= Group 8 (Sweden) =

Swedish feminist organization

Group 8 (Swedish: Grupp 8) was a feminist organization in Sweden, founded by eight women in Stockholm in 1968. The organization took up various feminist issues such as: demands for expansions of kindergartens, 6-hour working day, equal pay for equal work and opposition to pornography. Initially the organization was based in Stockholm, but later local groups were founded throughout the country. Although Group 8 dissolved in the early 2000s, their influence on feminism in Sweden is still prevalent.

== Origin ==
The eight original founders of the organization in 1968 were Barbro Back Berger, Birgitta Bolinder, Gunnel Granlid, Birgitta Svanberg, Greta Sörlin, Ulla Torpe, Anita Theorell and Åsa Åkerstedt. Karin Westman Berg, literary scholar and member of the Women's Literature Project at Uppsala University, held a gender conference circa 1967 in which the Group 8 founders attended. It was at this conference where the eight women first met.

By 1970 the group had increased to 16 members, all operating under the slogan "the private is political", which was intended to give recognition to women's struggles. Only four years after Group 8 appeared in Stockholm, forty-three Group 8's surfaced with about ten members each. A larger Group 8, with roughly thirty-five members, was formed in Malmö.

== Feminist equality comparison ==
The United States and other European countries had their own ways of going about establishing feminist equality in the 1960s and 1970s. In the United States, the feminist movement in the 1960s focused on, among other things, inequality in the workplace. Only 38% of women held jobs, and these jobs were limited to teachers, nurses, and secretaries. During this period, most upper and middle class white women were college educated, and felt irritated that they were confined to the house. A group of women, including Betty Friedan, decided to found an organization to fight this gender discrimination called the National Organization for Women (NOW). With help from NOW, women began inserting themselves in state, local, and national levels of politics.

In Britain, feminists played more of a secondary role. In Britain it was not necessary to establish an organization like NOW because of pressure groups already established in politics. By the 70's Britain's feminism had transitioned from a social feminism to a radical feminism. According to "Strands of Feminist Theory" by Penny Welch, socialist feminists are, "concerned with challenging capitalism as well as male supremacy," and radical feminists are described as seeing, "the basic division in all societies as that between men and women." As radical feminists, the focus was shifted from developing theories to various forms of activism such as establishing for themselves their own printing press, art culture, and feminist culture. British, radical feminists argued that women needed to be observed as an oppressed class, and what better place to start then in schools. Sexism in school education was challenged by these feminists as they worked to develop a curriculum that addressed sexist stereotyping, as well as challenged male vs. female sexuality in sexual education classes. In February of 1970 Britain held the first National Women's Liberation Movement conference in Oxford. During the conference over 600 women discussed various issues including equal pay, equal educational and job opportunities, free contraception and abortion, and free 24-hour nurseries. Although feminism in both America and Britain was quite different, the majority of people eventually developed opposition towards the present feminist groups and took the initiative to lessen their abilities to initiate political policies.

In contrast to the U.S. and Britain, Swedish feminist have achieved many of their goals in regards to women's equality, although a women's liberation movement only existed in minimal ways. Swedish feminists took a different route and focused on establishing non-discrimination policies. According to "Feminism and Politics a Comparative Perspective," in 1984, Sweden was often regarded as the country who had the most success establishing equality. Women in Sweden began liberating themselves from their patriarchal society as early as the 17th century, and by the 60's they were permitted to attend school, conduct business in their own names, and had gained equal inheritance rights. Although they had made significant progress in establishing equality, Swedish women still had further to go. It was not until 1968 that the feminist organization Group 8 was created.

Group 8 consisted of about 1,000 members but had no true leader. The women of Group 8 created a sense of political activism through the use of media. They made sure female feminist columnists and writers were hired by the two major newspapers in Sweden, allowing for a feminist voice to be heard by just about everyone. The group also sponsored housing set aside solely for women to help protect, strengthen, and empower the female population. Group 8 never became a consistently strong organization because they were more focused on class than on gender. Group 8's impact and efforts towards equality have since died down a lot. Although Group 8 no longer holds a significant position in the feminist movement, it still publishes an issue of their magazine, "Kvinnobulletinen", every month. "Kvinnobulletinen", also known as "Women's Bulletin," was started by Gunilla Thorgren, who was the chief editor from 1970 to 1975. The magazine was first released in 1970 and covered various feminist issues such as prostitution, unionism, women in the workplace, heterosexuality, and homosexuality.

== Swedish political structure ==
As a liberal democracy, the Swedish system typically has little opposition to framework and rules for the resolution of conflict. The local government gives power to executive committees to govern at a community level. This distinguishes Swedish politics as well as their low level of political activism, with the exception of voting. Swedish officials are typically suspicious of women's groups that do exist in Sweden; this is primarily due to the structure of the women's organizations being more traditional rather than "liberationists". Because the government model emphasizes consensus, minorities typically have difficulty developing and implementing movements for their cause.

The logo of Feminist Initiative

In 2005 the political part Feminist Initiative was formed, and announced it would field candidates in future elections. This political party, originally influenced by Group 8 and similar organizations, acquired 2500 members.

== Influence ==
In 1971, the group relaunched International Women's Day manifestations and also started publishing Kvinnobulletinen.

By 8 April 1972, the exhibition Women was compiled by Group 8 in Moderna Museet – a modern art museum in Stockholm. Later, in the same year, Group 8 is attributed to a reversal conducted by the Minister of Finance, Gunnar Sträng. They had three very clear demands: women's right to work, daycare, and education.

In 1973 a section that felt that more emphasis needed to be given to the class struggle broke away and formed Women of Labor (in Swedish: Arbetets kvinnor).

After making valuable contributions to Swedish societal issues, Group 8's importance to feminism in Sweden declined towards the end of the 1970s. In Sweden, some of the largest beneficiaries of Group 8's impact include the National Organization for Women's and Girls' Shelters in Sweden (ROKS) and the Feminist Initiative.
