= Women of Labour =

First issue of Rödhättan

Women of Labour (in Swedish: Arbetets kvinnor) was a feminist group in Sweden. The group emerged from a split from Grupp 8 in 1973. The founders of Arbetets kvinnor felt that gender oppression and class oppression functioned side by side, and that the women's movement could not ignore the class struggle.

The organization published Rödhättan. The last issue was published in 1981. Some of the activists who had worked with Rödhättan would later work with Kvinnotidningen Q (which was published until 1986).
