= Gertrud Åström =

Swedish business and organization leader

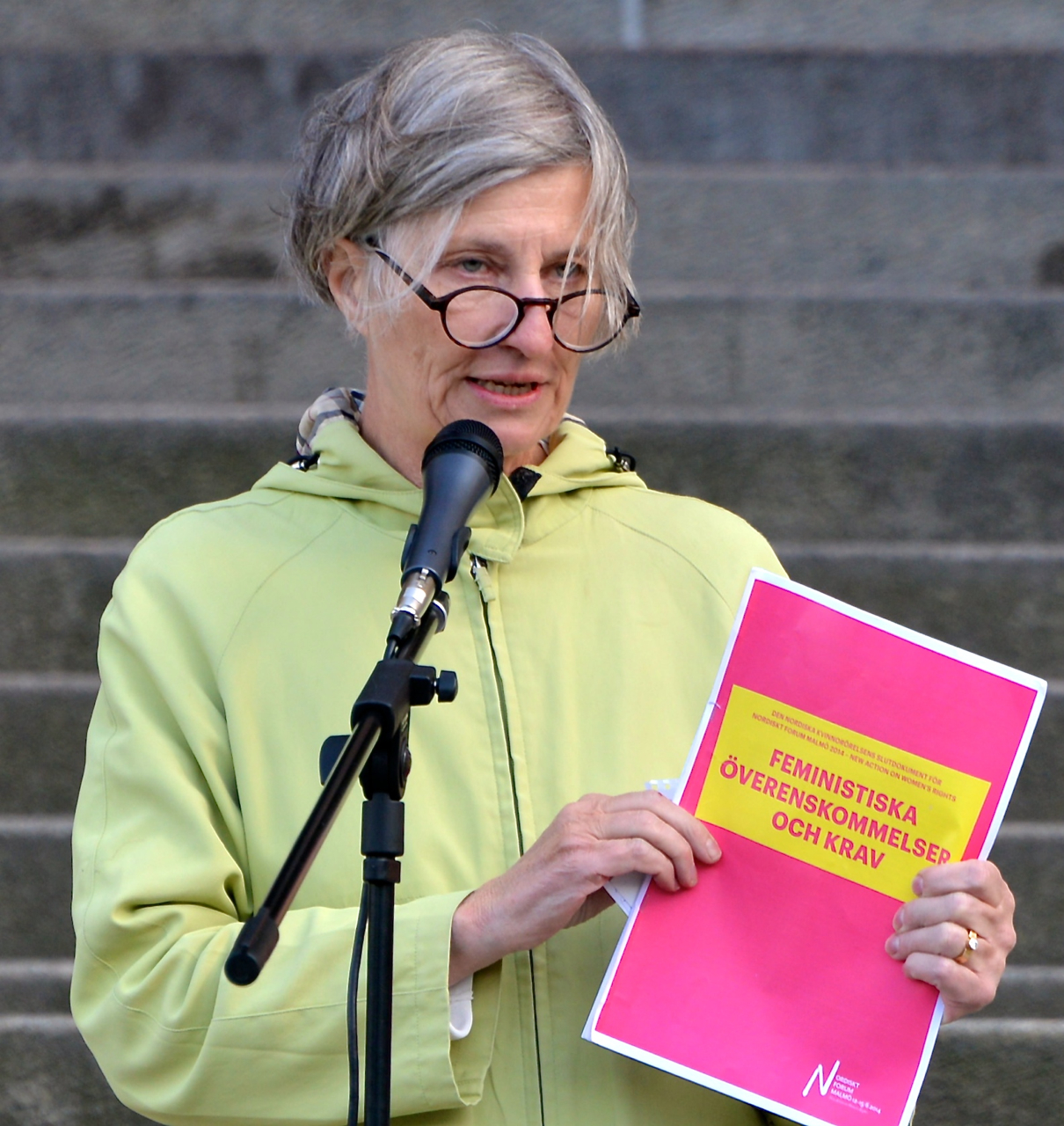
Gertrud Åström in 2014

Gertrud Maria Åström (born 28 July 1954 in Bodträsk in Kalix) is a Swedish business and organization leader. She was President of the Swedish Women's Lobby from 2009 to 2015. Åström previously was CEO of the publishing company Ordfront. In 2004 she was appointed by the Government of Sweden as a special rapporteur on gender equality policies.
