= Sophie Sager =

Swedish writer and feminist

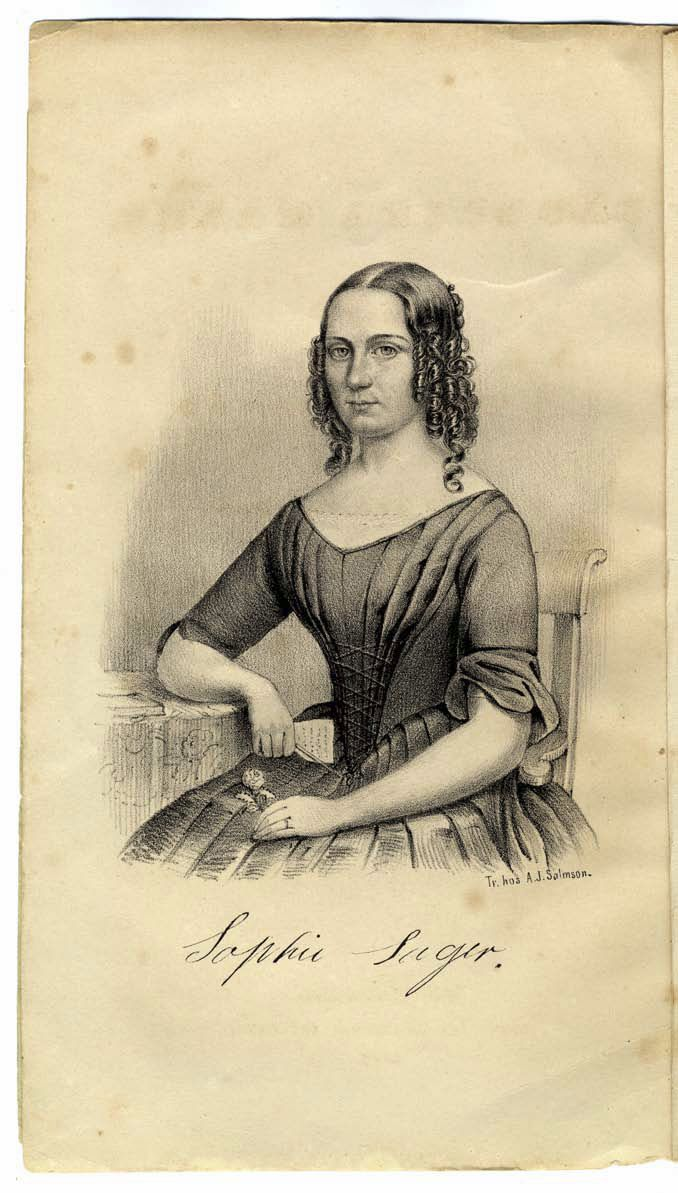
Sophie Sager.

Sophie (or Sofie) Sager, (Växjö, Sweden, 1825 – New York City, United States, 1902), was a Swedish writer and feminist. She was one of the first feminist activists and speakers for the modern women's movement in Sweden. She is also known for her part in the famous Sager Case (1848), where she sued a man for attempted rape and won the case, which was one of the most famous Swedish criminal cases of her time.

== Life ==
Born into a wealthy family, Sophie Sager was educated in a girls’ school. As an adult, she fell into poverty and supported herself as governess. Aspiring to start a dress-shop, she apprenticed herself to a tailor in Stockholm in 1848. An elderly man named Möller offered her a room in his Stockholm house. Sager accepted, but was sexually assaulted by Möller in her bed. She fought back, suffering severe injuries while preventing a rape. Escaping Möller’s house, Sager was treated by a doctor, who documented her injuries and encouraged her to report Möller to the police.

At that time, it was very unusual for a woman to report a rape, which would only cast shame upon her. In this event, Sager’s case received enormous attention in the press. Möller claimed Sager was insane. But the court was convinced by the doctor’s report, and found Möller guilty of attempted rape and violence.

After that incident and trial, Sager became one of the first feminist activists of the new women’s movement in Sweden, touring the country to speak about women’s rights. She claimed women had become passive regarding their few rights and suffered low self-esteem due to poor education. As an example, she reflected on her own education in a girls’ school, which did not teach much more than French and etiquette. On one occasion, she spoke dressed in male clothing.

In 1852, she published the autobiography: Bilder ur livet. Ett fosterbarns avslöjande genealogi (Images of life. The revealing tale of a foster child) of her experiences.

Sager moved to the US in 1854, where she became active within the American women's movement. She married the music teacher E. A. Wiener.

== Quotes ==
"I am the one who defies the false ideals of opinion, to enable myself to show my emancipation in my way of life.”

”I am the first woman in Sweden, to stand for the emancipation-theory in public, and therefore, it can not yet be so common, as it will be some day.”
