= Daniel Poohl =

Swedish writer

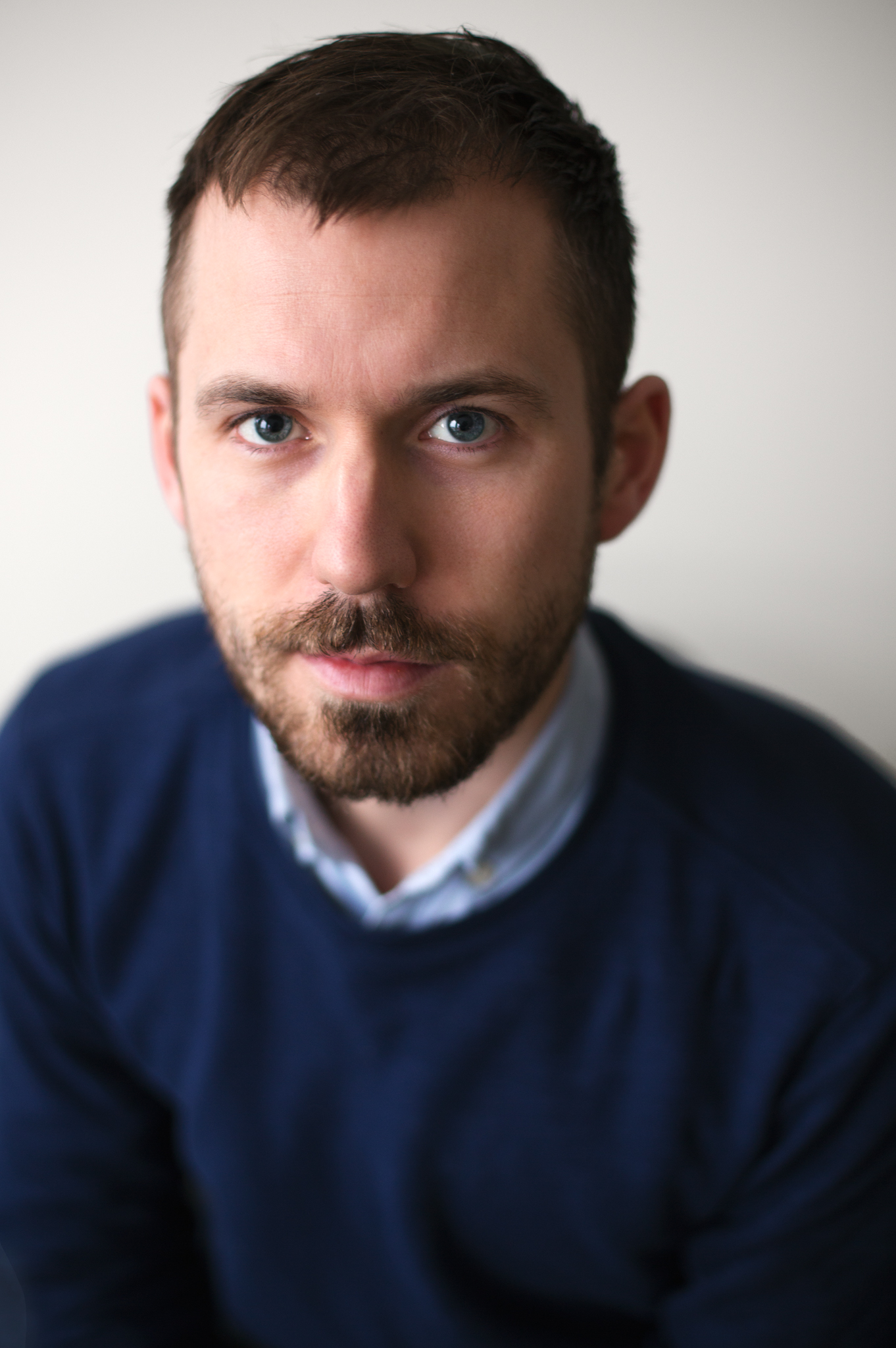
- Born: 11 August 1981 (age 45); Vänersborg
- Education: Sinclairgymnasiet, Uddevalla
- Writing career
- Notable work: Som om vi hade glömt

Daniel Poohl (born 11 August 1981) is a Swedish journalist and publicist who served as publisher (ansvarig utgivare) and CEO of the Expo magazine.

== Biography ==
Poohl was born in Vänersborg. He grew up in Åsensbruk in Dalsland and studied media at Sinclairgymnasiet in Uddevalla. During his time at the national guard training he did journalism work for Värnpliktsnytt, a newspaper for the soldiers. He started working at Expo at the age of twenty in 2001. Poohl became a known name in 2001 when he infiltrated the Nationaldemokraterna party to make a report that was broadcast on the show Folkhemmet on TV3. Poohl became the editorial assistant at Expo after the death of Stieg Larsson in 2004 and became the editor-in-chief in 2006.

Poohl is often used by media as a reference when it comes to questions about right-wing extremism and racism, for Dagens Nyheter, Svenska Dagbladet and Göteborgs-Posten. He writes articles about politics in Sweden for the English magazine Searchlight.

In 2013, Poohl wrote and published the book Som om vi hade glömt. On 6 August 2015 he presented Sommar i P1 on Sveriges Radio.
