= Expo (magazine) =

Swedish magazine

- Editor-in-Chief: Anna Fröjd
- Frequency: Four times a year
- Publisher: Daniel Poohl
- Founder: Stieg Larsson
- Founded: 1995; 31 years ago
- Company: Expo
- Country: Sweden
- Based in: Borlänge
- Language: Swedish
- Website: http://www.expo.se Expo Foundation

Expo is a Swedish anti-racist magazine started in 1995 by Stieg Larsson. It is issued by the non-profit Expo Foundation (Stiftelsen Expo). The magazine, issued four times a year, contains investigative journalism focused on nationalist, racist, anti-democratic, antisemitic, and far-right movements and organisations. It also publishes articles and podcasts on the Internet on a more regular basis. The people responsible for Expo make no connections with specific organisations or political parties, but work together with individuals and organisations that share Expo's platform. The chairman of the Expo Foundation is Charles Westin. The magazine is headquartered in Stockholm.

== History ==
Stieg Larsson, the author of the Millennium series of novels, was Expo's co-founder and editor-in-chief from 1995 until his death in 2004. Larsson's political and journalistic background in far-left political activism including in Kommunistiska Arbetareförbundet (Communist Workers' League), and Internationalen, led him to found the Expo Foundation, similar to the British Searchlight Foundation, with the aim of "studying and mapping anti-democratic, right-wing extremist and racist tendencies in society".

Expo became widely known in Sweden in June 1996 following a string of threats and attacks directed against companies printing and selling the magazine, and organisations supporting it. The words "Inget stöd till kommunist-Expo" (No support for communist Expo) were painted on the wall of the Moderate Party headquarters. In response, leading tabloid newspapers Aftonbladet and Expressen printed and distributed the June 1996 issue as a free supplement, with a circulation of around 800,000 copies.

Financial pressures in 1998 forced the people responsible for Expo to cease publication of the magazine and replace it with a newsletter. In 1999, Expo was restarted as a part of the magazine Svartvitt. When Svartvitt shut down in 2003, Expo returned to publication as an independent magazine.

The foundation's chairman of the board since 2023 is Anne Ramberg. The editor-in-chief of Expo is Anna Fröjd (since 2019), while Daniel Poohl is CEO and publisher (ansvarig utgivare). In 2014 the circulation of the magazine was 3,500 copies.

== See also ==
- Bilan Osman
- Andreas Rosenlund
