= Andrea Cornwall =

Professor of anthropology and development

- Education: SOAS, University of London
- Occupation: Political Anthropologist
- Children: Jake Cornwall Scoones, Kate Cornwall Scoones

Andrea Cornwall is a British political anthropologist who is Professor of Global Development and Anthropology at King's College London.

== Professional career ==
Andrea Cornwall is a political anthropologist who specialises in the anthropology of gender and sexuality, citizen participation and participatory research.

After graduating from SOAS with a PhD in Social Anthropology, she began her career as a Research Fellow at the Institute of Development Studies in Sussex, as a member of the Participation Team and the Gender Working Group. With Vera Schattan Coelho, she led a thematic cluster in the Citizenship, Participation and Accountability Development Research Centre on inclusion, rights and voice. Their work drew together researchers from Angola, Bangladesh, Brazil, India, Mexico, Nigeria, South Africa and the UK to explore the emergence of new democratic spaces and democratic practices focused on a more deliberative and inclusionary approach to governance.

Together with Susie Jolly, Cornwall co-founded the IDS Sexuality Programme, which took shape through a series of international gatherings bringing activists, practitioners, policy makers and academics together to explore the marginalisation of sexuality in development and the politics of pleasure. Cornwall also worked with Elizabeth Harrison and Ann Whitehead to convene leading figures in the field of gender and development to reflect critically on the gender agenda in development, giving rise to collections exploring challenges, contradictions and contestations in feminist approaches to development and change, and the contested politics of women's rights.

Cornwall was the Director of the Pathways of Women’s Empowerment Research Programme Consortium, which ran from 2006 through 2014. This programme was funded by UKAid from the Department for International Development and the Swedish and Norwegian governments, and its main aim was to elucidate factors that help create more equality and equity between men and women through collection of women's experiences in this sphere. The programme sought to make the experiences of many individual women visible to teach and inspire others. She remains an Honorary Associate of the Institute of Development Studies.

In 2011, she joined Sussex University's School of Global Studies as Professor in Global Development, where she taught introductory courses in international development to first year undergraduate and Master's students, experimenting with immersive learning and decolonising the way international development was taught. As the Pathways programme came to a close, she took up a temporary role as interim Head of School and found in it a new field of engagement for work on citizenship, participation, accountability and equity. Appointed Head of School in early 2014, and serving as Deputy Pro-Vice Chancellor Equality and Diversity from 2016 to 2017, she remained at Sussex until the conclusion of her term of office in August 2018. She then joined London University's School of Oriental and African Studies as Pro-Director Research & Enterprise, moving to KCL in August 2022.

Her work has focused on what needs to change to give those affected by decisions, norms and institutions a voice, focusing primarily on the rights of women and sexual minorities. Among the specific topics she has worked on are contraception from a woman's point-of-view; indigenous medical knowledge and women's experiences of infertility and sexually transmitted diseases in Nigeria and Zimbabwe; rights and social movements of sex workers in India and of domestic workers in Brazil; and the quality of democratic processes in Brazil.

== Books ==
Participation and Democracy

Participation: A Reader, Andrea Cornwall (ed.), Zed Books, 2011

Novos Espaços Democraticos: Experiencias Internacionais, Andrea Cornwall and Vera Schattan P. Coelho (eds.), São Paulo, Editora Brasileira, 2009.

Democratising Engagement: What the UK Can Learn from International Experience, Andrea Cornwall, Demos, 2009.

Spaces for Change? Representation, Inclusion and Voice in New Democratic Arenas, Andrea Cornwall and Vera Schattan Coelho (eds.), Zed Books, 2006.

Pathways to Participation: Practitioners’ Reflections on PRA, Andrea Cornwall and Garett Pratt (eds.), IT Publications, 2003.

Beneficiary, Customer, Citizen: Perspectives on Participation for Poverty Reduction, A.Cornwall, Sida Studies 2, Sida: Stockholm. 2000.

Masculinities Masculinities Under Neoliberalism, Andrea Cornwall, Frank G. Karioris and Nancy Lindisfarne (eds.), Zed Books, 2016.

Men and Development: Politicising Masculinities, Andrea Cornwall, Jerker Edstrom and Alan Greig (eds.), Zed Books, 2011.

Dislocating Masculinity: Comparative Ethnographies, Andrea Cornwall and Nancy Lindisfarne (eds.), Routledge, 1994. Second edition, 2017.

Feminisms and Development

Feminism, Empowerment and Development: Changing Women’s Lives, Andrea Cornwall and Jenny Edwards (eds.). Zed Books, 2014.

The Politics of Rights: Dilemmas for Feminist Praxis, Andrea Cornwall and Maxine Molyneux (eds)., Routledge, 2009.

Gender Myths and Feminist Fables: The Struggle for Interpretive Power in Gender and Development, Andrea Cornwall, Elizabeth Harrison and Ann Whitehead (eds.), Blackwell, 2008.

Feminisms in Development: Contradictions, Contestations and Challenges, Andrea Cornwall, Elizabeth Harrison and Ann Whitehead (eds.), Zed Books, 2008.

Readings in Gender in Africa, Andrea Cornwall (ed.), International African Institute, 2005.

Sexualities

Researching Sex and Sexualities, eds. Charlotte Morris, Paul Boyce, Andrea Cornwall, Hannah Frith, Laura Harvey and YingYing Huang, Researching Sex and Sexualities, London: Zed Books. 2018.

Women, Sexuality and the Political Power of Pleasure, Susie Jolly, Andrea Cornwall and Kate Hawkins (eds.), Zed Books, 2013.

Development with a Body, Sonia Correa, Andrea Cornwall and Susie Jolly (eds.), Zed Books, 2009.

Realizing Rights: Transforming Approaches to Sexual and Reproductive Wellbeing, Andrea Cornwall and Alice Welbourn (eds.), Zed Books, 2002. [published in Brazil in 2006 as Direitos Sexuais e Reproductivas]

Development

Revolutionising Development: Reflections on the Work of Robert Chambers, Andrea Cornwall and Ian Scoones (eds.), Earthscan, 2011.

Deconstructing Development Discourse: Buzzwords and Fuzzwords, Andrea Cornwall and Deborah Eade (eds.), Practical Action Publishing, 2010.

The Beast of Bureaucracy and Other Tales from Valhalla, Andrea Cornwall, Katja Jassey, Seema Arora-Jonsson and Patta Scott-Villiers, Bath Press, 2007.
