= Gnesta =

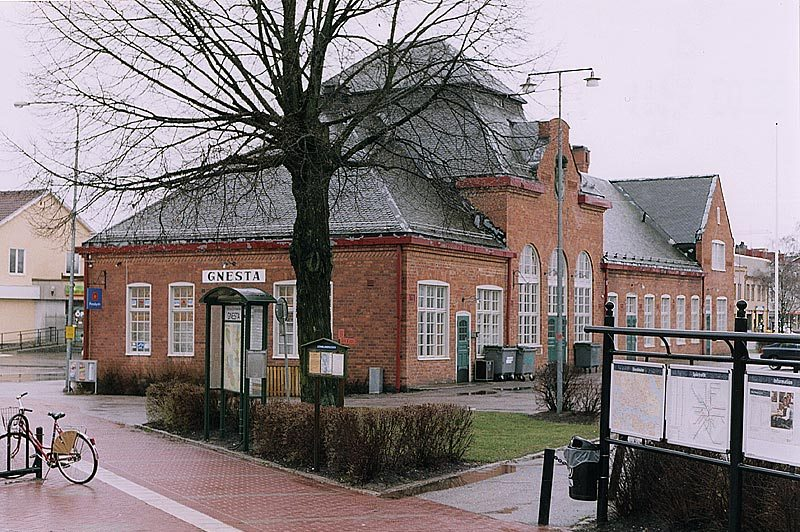
- Gnesta railway station

- Location within Södermanland Location within Sweden
- Coordinates: 59°03′N 17°18′E
- Country: Sweden
- Province: Södermanland
- County: Södermanland County and Stockholm County
- Municipality: Gnesta Municipality and Södertälje Municipality

Area
  - Total: 3.86 km^{2} (1.49 sq mi)

Population (31 December 2020)
  - Total: 6,376
  - Density: 1,441/km^{2} (3,730/sq mi)
- Time zone: UTC+1 (CET)
  - Summer (DST): UTC+2 (CEST)
- Climate: Cfb

Gnesta (Swedish pronunciation: [ˈgněːsta]) is a bimunicipal locality and the seat of Gnesta Municipality, Södermanland County, Sweden. The population was 6,376 as of 2020.

Gnesta is in Södermanland, on the border with Stockholm County. The Stockholm commuter rail has a terminus in Gnesta.

The 2009 film adaptation of Stieg Larsson's book The Girl with the Dragon Tattoo was shot in Gnesta, which represented the fictional Hedestad and Hedeby Island.

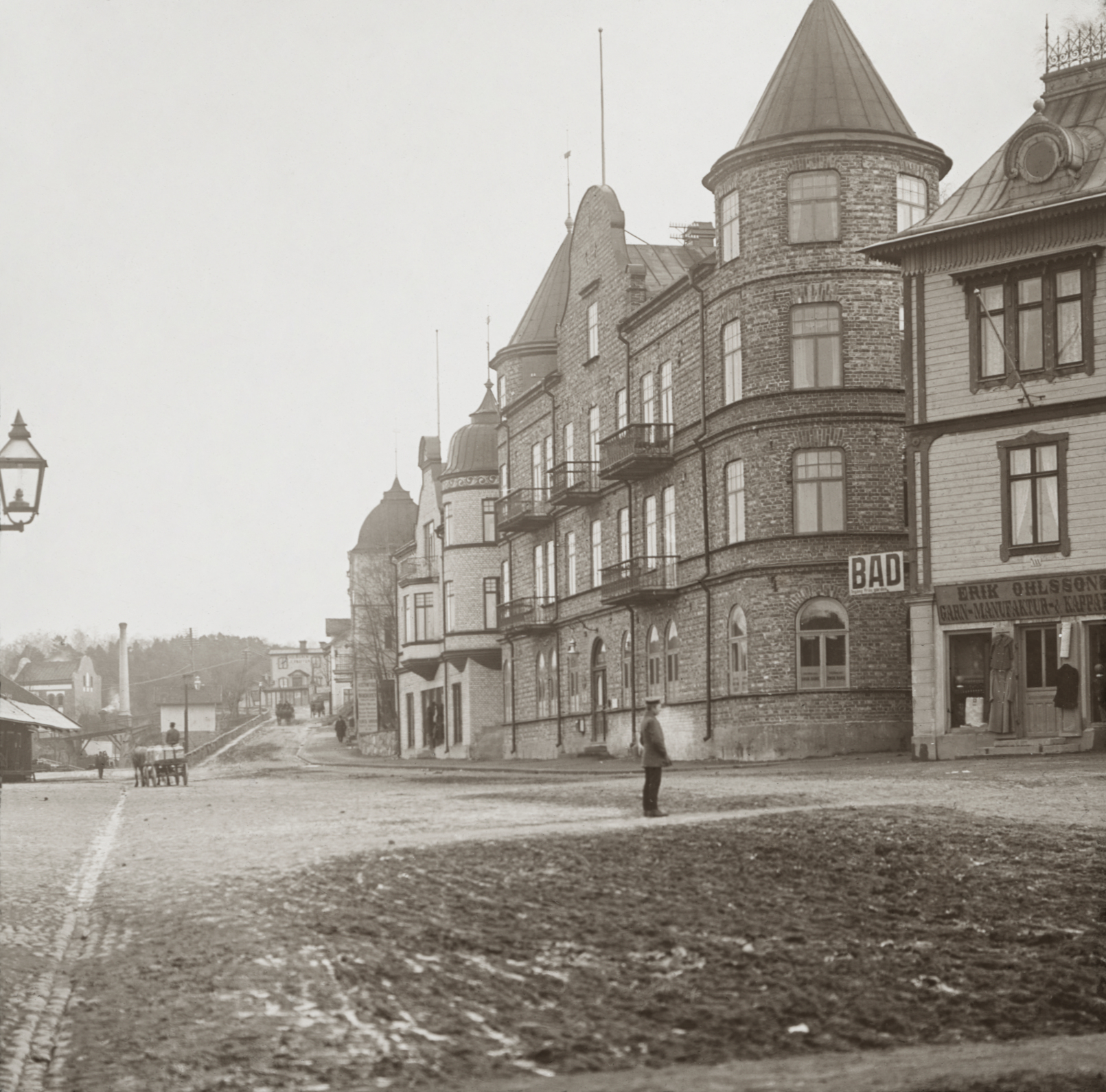
Street in Gnesta with bathhouse, c. 1900
