= Södermanland Runic Inscription 16 =

Viking Age runestone

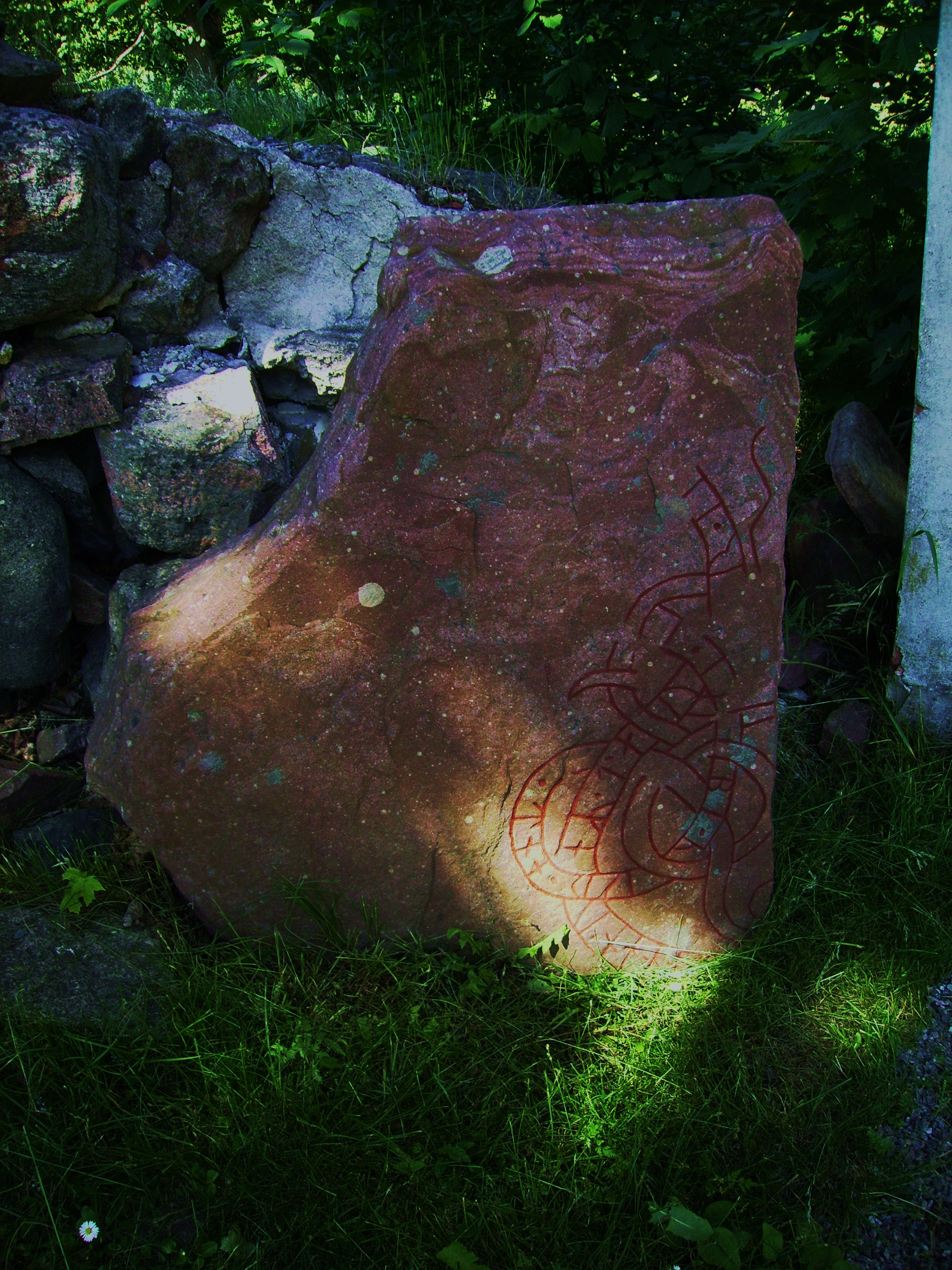
Sö 16

The Södermanland Runic Inscription 16 is a Viking Age runestone engraved in Old Norse with the Younger Futhark runic alphabet. It is in sandstone and located in the cemetery of Kattnäs Church in Gnesta Municipality.

== Inscription ==
· þ(i)... ...uþin · hhn · unʀ · tauþr · i [hailaby] halbi · kuþ · aat ·
{} .. [A]uðin/[L]uðin. {} Hann {} vaʀ {} dauðr {} i Hæiðaby. Hialpi {} Guð {} and. {}
"... Auðin/Loðin. He died in Hedeby. May God help (his) spirit."

aʀ
<aʀ>
"<aʀ>"
