= Sillen =

Lake in Södertälje Municipality, Sweden

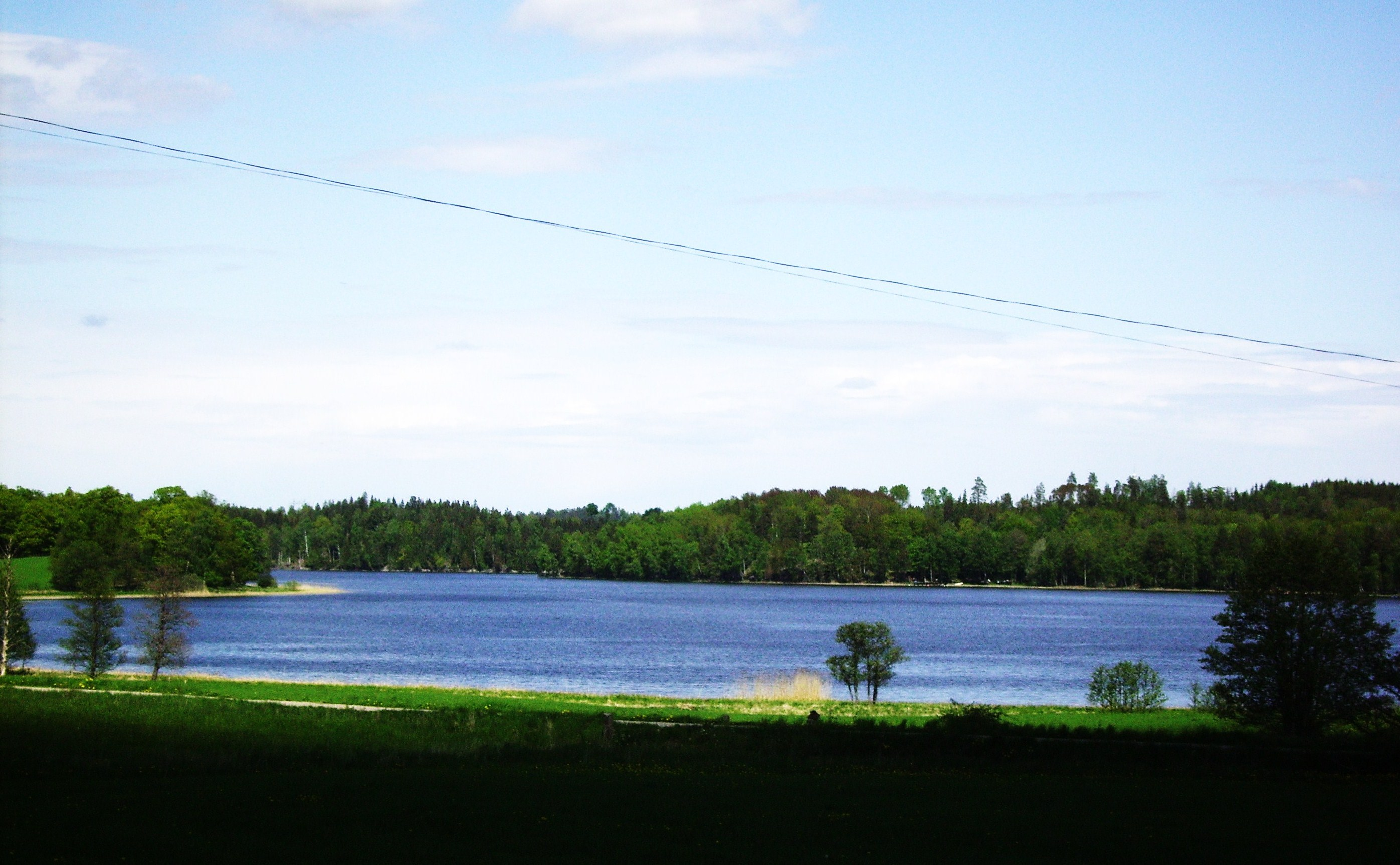

- Location within Södermanland
- Coordinates: 58°59′N 17°22′E
- Basin countries: Sweden

Sillen is a lake in Södermanland, Sweden. It straddles the boundary between Gnesta Municipality in Södermanland County and Södertälje Municipality in Stockholm County.
