= Stjärnhov =

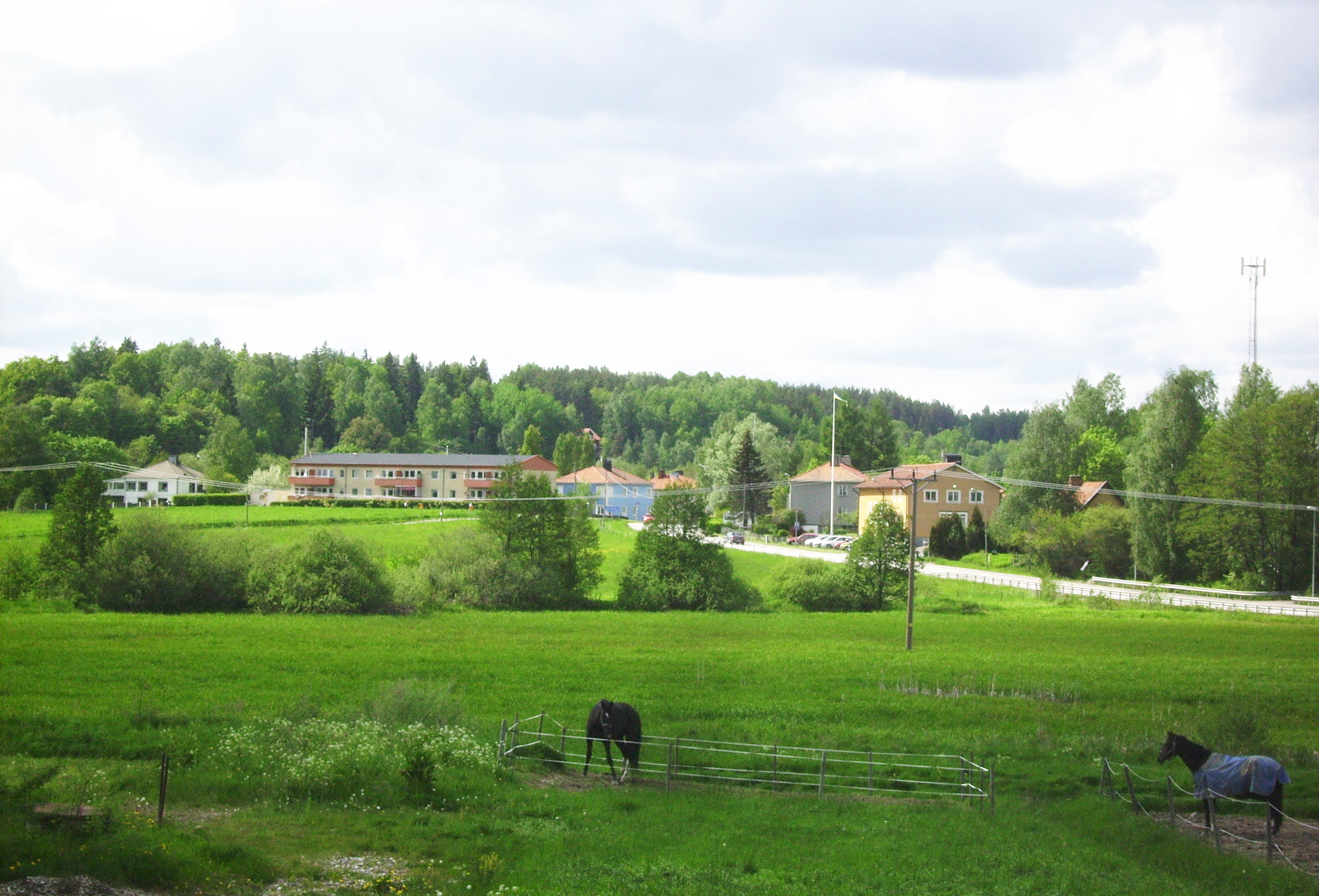

- Location within Södermanland Location within Sweden
- Coordinates: 59°05′N 17°00′E
- Country: Sweden
- Province: Södermanland
- County: Södermanland County
- Municipality: Gnesta Municipality

Area
  - Total: 0.97 km^{2} (0.37 sq mi)

Population (31 December 2020)
  - Total: 574
  - Density: 590/km^{2} (1,500/sq mi)
- Time zone: UTC+1 (CET)
  - Summer (DST): UTC+2 (CEST)
- Climate: Dfb

Stjärnhov (Swedish pronunciation: [ɧæɳˈhoːv]) is a locality situated in Gnesta Municipality, Södermanland County, Sweden with 549 inhabitants in 2010.

== Riksdag elections ==
Year	%	Votes	V	S	MP	C	L	KD	M	SD	NyD	Left	Right
1973	83.8	586	2.9	38.1		30.0	12.8	2.0	14.2			41.0	57.0
1976	90.3	651	2.6	36.1		33.2	11.5	1.4	15.2			38.7	59.9
1979	89.7	676	3.1	36.2		27.4	9.3	1.0	22.5			39.3	59.2
1982	89.1	649	3.7	36.1	3.7	26.8	5.4	0.3	23.9			39.8	56.1
1985	90.2	673	6.4	34.3	3.0	23.8	9.2		23.3			40.7	56.3
1988	83.2	640	5.3	34.8	9.1	24.1	8.0	1.6	16.9			49.2	48.9
1991	82.5	601	4.0	29.5	6.7	17.0	5.7	8.7	18.6		9.2	33.4	49.9
1994	86.4	651	4.8	38.9	11.4	17.2	3.7	4.3	18.4		0.3	55.0	43.6
1998	81.5	605	12.7	29.3	5.8	14.0	2.8	11.7	23.3			47.8	51.9
2002	80.7	622	6.6	35.2	6.6	14.8	12.9	8.2	15.0	0.2		48.4	50.8
2006	83.0	614	3.7	32.7	7.5	16.0	7.0	3.9	25.2	2.0		44.0	52.1
2010	83.6	621	6.4	28.0	7.4	12.4	6.4	4.3	29.0	3.5		41.9	52.2
2014	86.3	639	6.4	27.7	4.4	12.2	5.2	4.2	22.5	12.5		38.5	44.1
2018	85.9	621	7.7	24.6	4.0	14.0	4.3	5.2	17.4	20.6		50.4	47.5
