= Gnesta Municipality =

Gnesta Municipality Gnesta kommun
- Municipality
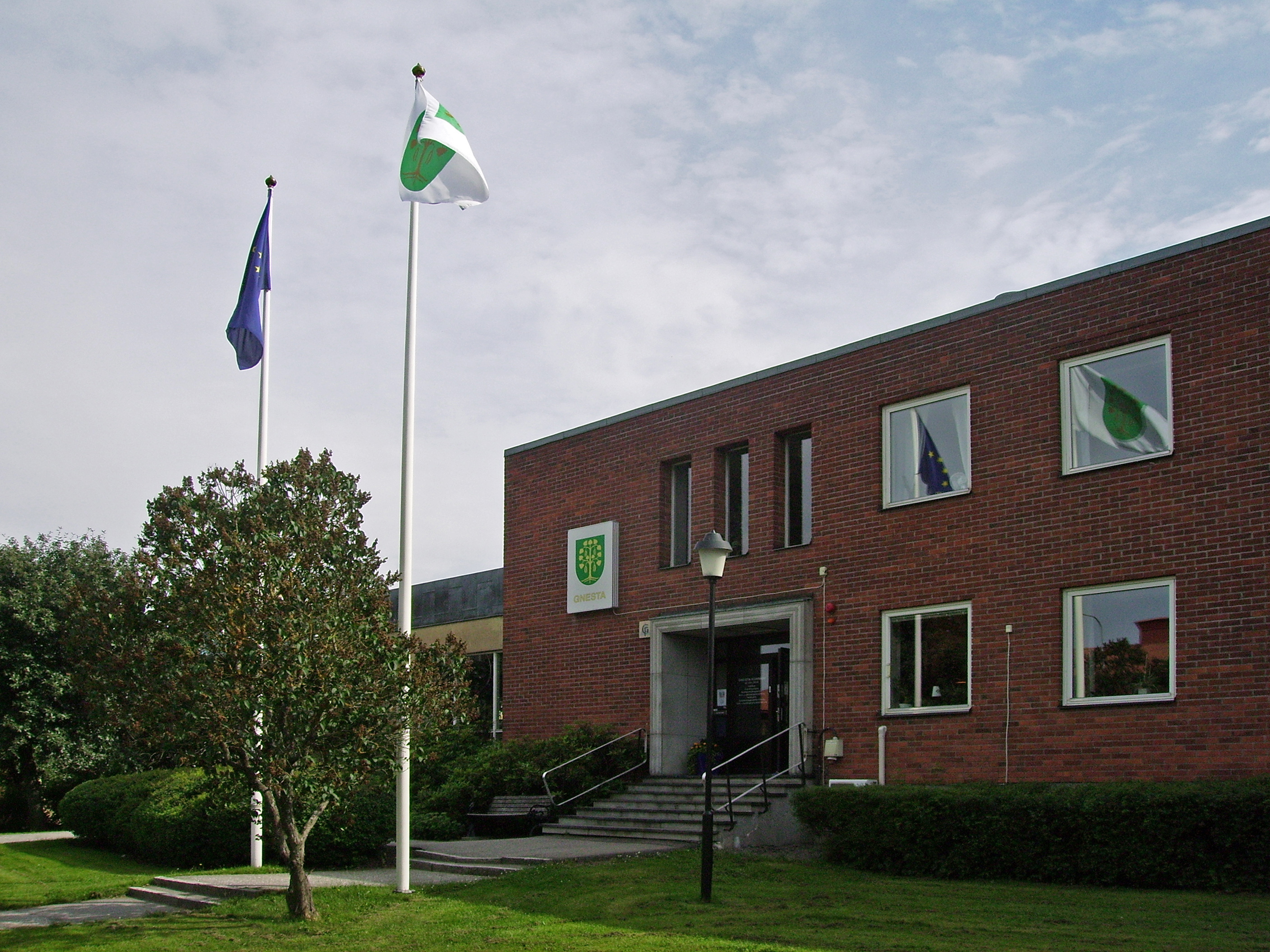
- Gnesta City Hall

- Flag Coat of arms

- Coordinates: 59°03′N 17°18′E
- Country: Sweden
- County: Södermanland County
- Seat: Gnesta

Area
  - Total: 538.14 km^{2} (207.78 sq mi)
  - Land: 461.24 km^{2} (178.09 sq mi)
  - Water: 76.9 km^{2} (29.7 sq mi)
- Area as of 1 January 2014.

Population (30 June 2025)
  - Total: 11,389
  - Density: 24.692/km^{2} (63.952/sq mi)
- Time zone: UTC+1 (CET)
  - Summer (DST): UTC+2 (CEST)
- ISO 3166 code: SE
- Province: Södermanland
- Municipal code: 0461
- Website: www.gnesta.se

Gnesta Municipality (Swedish: Gnesta kommun) is a municipality in Södermanland County in southeast Sweden. Its seat is located in the town of Gnesta, with some 5,000 inhabitants.

The present municipality was created in 1992, when Nyköping Municipality (of which it had been a part since 1974) was split up.

It is in the middle of the cultural Södermanland province. Although it only has around 10,000 permanent inhabitants, the population increases substantially in the summer due to the many summer houses.

Industry-wise, Gnesta mostly has small companies with few employed. There are about 800 registered companies in the municipality, and a "large" company would have 25-50 employees.

== Localities ==
From Statistics Sweden, 2004.

- Gnesta has about 5,000 inhabitants
- Björnlunda 760
- Stjärnhov 573

== Geography ==
The highest peak within Gnesta Municipality is at 103 metres (338 ft) at the Gnesta-Flen-Strängnäs municipal tripoint. The municipality is landlocked but near the coast, which means that the lowest point is at 9 metres (30 ft) above sea level on the shores of lake Sillen.

== Notable events ==
Gnesta became Hedestad when Stieg Larsson's book, The Girl with the Dragon Tattoo, was made into a film. Filming took place in April 2008. The film premiered worldwide, and in Gnesta, on 27 February 2009.

== Elections ==
=== Riksdag ===
The results of Sweden Democrats were not published by SCB at a municipal level between 1991 and 1998 due to the party's small size at a nationwide level.

Year	Turnout	Votes	V	S	MP	C	L	KD	M	SD	ND
1991	86.4	5,564	3.7	33.8	4.4	15.1	7.8	6.0	19.4	0.0	9.3
1994	86.7	5,892	5.5	42.2	7.7	13.3	6.0	3.6	19.6	0.0	0.9
1998	81.3	5,634	10.0	34.1	6.8	10.7	3.4	13.0	20.8	0.0	0.0
2002	80.2	5,769	6.6	40.3	6.4	10.3	11.4	8.5	14.4	0.6	0.0
2006	82.6	5,990	4.9	34.5	7.3	11.3	5.5	5.6	26.1	2.5	0.0
2010	85.3	6,684	5.7	28.7	9.8	8.9	5.8	4.0	29.5	6.0	0.0
2014	87.2	6,880	5.9	30.3	7.7	8.7	3.3	2.9	23.4	13.2	0.0

Blocs

This lists the relative strength of the socialist and centre-right blocs since 1991, but parties not elected to the Riksdag are inserted as "other", including the Sweden Democrats results from 1988 to 2006 but also the Greens in 1991. The sources are identical to the table above. The coalition or government mandate marked in bold formed the government after the election. New Democracy got elected in 1991 but are still listed as "other" due to the short lifespan of the party. "Elected" is the total number of percentage points from the municipality that went to parties who were elected to the Riksdag.

Year	Turnout	Votes	Left	Right	SD	Other	Elected
1991	86.4	5,564	37.5	**48.3**	0.0	14.2	95.1
1994	86.7	5,892	**55.4**	42.5	0.0	2.1	97.9
1998	81.3	5,634	**50.9**	47.9	0.0	1.2	98.8
2002	80.2	5,769	**53.3**	44.6	0.0	2.1	97.9
2006	82.6	5,990	46.7	**48.5**	0.0	4.8	95.2
2010	85.3	6,684	44.2	**48.2**	6.0	1.6	98.4
2014	87.2	6,880	**43.9**	38.3	13.2	4.6	95.4

== Demographics ==
This is a demographic table based on Gnesta Municipality's electoral districts in the 2022 Swedish general election sourced from SVT's election platform, in turn taken from SCB official statistics.

In total there were 11,501 residents, of which 8,615 were Swedish citizens of voting age. 49.7% voted for the left coalition and 48.8% for the right coalition. Indicators are in percentage points except population totals and income.

Location	Residents	Citizen adults	Left vote	Right vote	Employed	Swedish parents	Foreign heritage	Income SEK	Degree
Location			%	%					
Björnlunda	1,408	1,099	47.3	51.4	85	86	14	24,631	29
Dansut	1,896	1,464	47.2	52.1	85	87	13	28,199	40
Freja	1,815	1,277	54.6	43.8	83	82	18	26,578	43
Frönäs	2,182	1,556	46.5	52.1	86	85	15	29,346	40
Gnesta C	2,069	1,562	56.9	41.7	72	76	24	20,881	28
Gryt	959	706	50.2	48.2	77	79	21	23,530	33
Gåsinge-Dillnäs	1,172	951	43.9	54.6	78	86	14	25,435	38
Source: SVT

== Sister cities ==
Gnesta has two sister cities, both with around 6,000 inhabitants:

- Saulkrasti, Latvia
- Sundsøre Municipality, Denmark
