= Bo Persson =

- Occupation: Sound mixer
- Years active: 1979-present

Bo Persson is a sound mixer. On 24 January 2012 he was nominated for an Academy Award for the film The Girl with the Dragon Tattoo.
