= Stieg Larsson =

Swedish writer, journalist, and activist (1954–2004)

- Born: Karl Stig-Erland Larsson; 15 August 1954; Skellefteå, Sweden
- Died: 9 November 2004 (aged 50); Stockholm, Sweden
- Occupations: Journalist, novelist
- Partner: Eva Gabrielsson (1974–2004; his death)
- Relatives: Knut Erland Fridolf Larsson (father), Gerd Dagny Vivianne Boström (mother)
- Writing career
- Period: 1990s–2004
- Genres: Crime fiction, thriller
- Notable work: The Millennium Trilogy
- Website: stieglarsson.com

Karl Stig-Erland "Stieg" Larsson (/stiːɡ ˈlɑːrsən/, Swedish: [ˈkɑːɭ stiːɡ ˈæ̌ːɭand ˈlɑ̌ːʂɔn]; 15 August 1954 – 9 November 2004) was a Swedish writer, journalist, and far-left activist. He is best known for writing the first trilogy in the Millennium series of crime novels, which was published posthumously, starting in 2005, after he died of a sudden heart attack. The trilogy was adapted as three motion pictures in Sweden, and one in the United States (for the first book only). Larsson had conceived of ten books in the series; the publisher commissioned David Lagercrantz to write the next trilogy, and Karin Smirnoff to write the third trilogy in the series, which has eight novels as of December 2025. For much of his life, Larsson lived and worked in Stockholm. His journalistic work covered socialist politics and he acted as an independent researcher of right-wing extremism.

He was the second-best-selling fiction author in the world for 2008, owing to the success of the English translation of The Girl with the Dragon Tattoo, behind Afghan-American novelist Khaled Hosseini. The third and final novel in the Millennium trilogy, The Girl Who Kicked the Hornets' Nest, became the bestselling book in the United States in 2010, according to Publishers Weekly. By March 2015, his series had sold 80 million copies worldwide.

== Early life, family and education ==
Stieg Larsson was born in Skelleftehamn, Västerbottens län, Sweden, the son of Erland Larsson (1935–2026) and his wife Vivianne, née Boström (1937–1991). His father and maternal grandfather worked in the Rönnskärsverken smelting plant in Skelleftehamn. Suffering from arsenic poisoning, his father resigned from his job, and the family subsequently moved to Stockholm. However, because of their cramped living conditions, they chose to let one-year-old Larsson remain behind. Until the age of nine, Larsson lived with his grandparents in a small wooden house in the countryside, near the village of Bjursele in Norsjö Municipality, Västerbotten County. He attended the village school and used cross-country skis to get to and from school during the long, snowy winters in northern Sweden, experiences that he remembered fondly.

In the book "There Are Things I Want You to Know" About Stieg Larsson and Me, Eva Gabrielsson describes this as Larsson's motivation for setting part of his first novel The Girl with the Dragon Tattoo in northern Sweden, which Gabrielsson calls "godforsaken places at the back of beyond."

Larsson was not as fond of the urban environment in the city Umeå, where he resided with his parents after his grandfather, Severin Boström, died of a heart attack at age 50.

Larsson earned a secondary diploma in social sciences in 1972. He applied to the Joint Colleges of Journalism in Stockholm, but he failed the entrance examination. In 1974, Larsson was drafted into the Swedish Army under the conscription law. He spent 16 months in compulsory military service, training as a mortarman in an infantry unit in Kalmar County.

=== Name change ===
Larsson's first name was originally Stig, which is the standard spelling. In his early 20s, he changed it to avoid confusion with his friend Stig Larsson, who went on to become a well-known author well before Stieg did. The pronunciation is the same regardless of spelling.

== Early writing ==
On his 12th birthday, Larsson's parents gave him a typewriter as a birthday gift.

Larsson's first efforts at writing fiction were in the genre of science fiction. As an avid science fiction reader from an early age, he became active in Swedish science fiction fandom around 1971; he co-edited, with Rune Forsgren, his first fanzine, Sfären, in 1972; and he attended his first science fiction convention, SF•72, in Stockholm. Through the 1970s, Larsson published around 30 additional fanzine issues; after his move to Stockholm in 1971, he became active in the Scandinavian SF Society, of which he was a board member in 1978 and 1979, and chairman in 1980.

In his first fanzines, 1972–74, he published a handful of early short stories, while submitting others to other semiprofessional or amateur magazines. He was co-editor or editor of several science-fiction fanzines, including Sfären and FIJAGH!; in 1978–79, he was president of the largest Swedish science-fiction fan club, Skandinavisk Förening för Science Fiction. An account of this period in Larsson's life, along with detailed information on his fanzine writing and short stories, is included in the biographical essays written by Larsson's friend John-Henri Holmberg in The Tattooed Girl, by Holmberg with Dan Burstein and Arne De Keijzer, 2011.

In early June 2010, manuscripts for two such stories, as well as fanzines with one or two others, were noted in the National Library of Sweden (to which this material had been donated a few years earlier, mainly by the Alvar Appeltofft Memorial Foundation, which works to further science-fiction fandom in Sweden). This discovery of what was called "unknown" works by Larsson generated considerable publicity.

== Activism and journalism ==
While working as a photographer, Larsson became engaged in far-left political activism. He became a member of Kommunistiska Arbetareförbundet (Communist Workers' League), edited the Swedish Trotskyist journal Fjärde internationalen, journal of the Swedish section of the Fourth International. He wrote regularly for the weekly Internationalen.

Larsson spent parts of 1977 in Eritrea, training a squad of female Eritrean People's Liberation Front guerrillas in the use of mortars. He was forced to abandon that work after he contracted a kidney disease. Upon his return to Sweden, he worked as a graphic designer at the largest Swedish news agency, Tidningarnas Telegrambyrå, between 1977 and 1999.

Larsson's political convictions, as well as his journalistic experiences, led him to found the Swedish Expo Foundation, similar to the British Searchlight Foundation, established to "counteract the growth of the extreme right and the white power culture in schools and among young people." He also became the editor of the foundation's magazine, Expo, in 1995.

When he was not at his day job, he worked on independent research into right-wing extremism in Sweden. In 1991, his research resulted in his first book, Extremhögern (The Extreme Right). Larsson quickly became instrumental in documenting and exposing Swedish extreme right and racist organisations. He was an influential debater and lecturer on the subject, reportedly living for years under death threats from his political enemies. The political party Sweden Democrats (Sverigedemokraterna) was a major subject of his research.

== Work ==
=== Novels ===
Larsson had originally planned a series of 10 books and had completed two and most of a third when he began looking for publishers. At the time of his death in 2004, only three had been completed, and although accepted for publication, none had yet been printed. These were published posthumously as the Millennium series.

The first book in the series was published in Sweden as Män som hatar kvinnor (literally "Men who hate women") in 2005. It was titled for the English-language market as The Girl with the Dragon Tattoo and published in the United Kingdom in February 2008. It was awarded the Glass Key award as the best Nordic crime novel in 2005.

His second novel, Flickan som lekte med elden (2006, The Girl Who Played with Fire), received the Best Swedish Crime Novel Award in 2006 and was published in the United Kingdom in January 2009.

The third novel, Luftslottet som sprängdes (literally "The castle in the air which was blown up"), published in English as The Girl Who Kicked the Hornets' Nest, was published in the United Kingdom in October 2009 and the United States in May 2010.

Larsson left about three-quarters of a fourth novel on a notebook computer, now possessed by his partner, Eva Gabrielsson; synopses or manuscripts of the fifth and sixth in the series, which he intended to comprise an eventual total of ten books, may also exist. Gabrielsson has stated in her book "There Are Things I Want You to Know" About Stieg Larsson and Me (2011) that she feels capable of finishing the book.

In 2013, Swedish publisher Norstedts contracted David Lagercrantz, a Swedish author and journalist, to continue the Millennium series. Lagercrantz did not have access to the material in Gabrielsson's possession, which remains unpublished. The new book was published in August 2015 in connection with the 10th anniversary of the series, under the Swedish title Det som inte dödar oss (literally "That which doesn't kill us"); the English title is The Girl in the Spider's Web.

The fifth book in the Millennium series was released in September 2017. The Swedish title is Mannen som sökte sin skugga (literally "The man who hunted his shadow") and the English title is The Girl Who Takes an Eye for an Eye.

The sixth book in the Millennium series was released in August 2019. The Swedish title is Hon som måste dö (literally "She who must die") and the English title is The Girl Who Lived Twice.

The seventh book in the Millennium series was released in November 2022. The Swedish title is Havsörnens skrik (literally "The cry of the sea eagle") and the English title is The Girl in the Eagle's Talons, written by Karin Smirnoff.

=== Film adaptations ===
The Swedish film production company Yellow Bird has produced film versions of the Millennium series, co-produced with the Danish film production company Nordisk Film. The three films were all released in 2009 in Scandinavia.

Sony Pictures released a film adaptation of the first book in the Millennium series. Directed by David Fincher, The Girl with the Dragon Tattoo was released in 2011. Despite the film being a critical and commercial success, plans for sequels were ultimately scrapped.

=== Influences ===
Through his written works, as well as in interviews, Larsson acknowledged that a significant number of his literary influences were American and British crime/detective fiction authors. His heroine has some similarities with Carol O'Connell's "Mallory", who first appeared in Mallory's Oracle (1994). In his work Larsson made a habit of inserting the names of some of his favourites within the text, sometimes by making his characters read the works of Larsson's favorite authors. Topping the list were Sara Paretsky, Agatha Christie, Val McDermid, Dorothy L. Sayers, Elizabeth George, and Enid Blyton.

One of the strongest influences originates from his own country: Pippi Longstocking, by Sweden's much-loved children's author Astrid Lindgren. Larsson explained that one of his main recurring characters in the Millennium series, Lisbeth Salander, is actually fashioned on a grown-up Pippi Longstocking as he chose to sketch her. Additional connections to Lindgren's literary work are in the Larsson novels; for example, the other main character, Mikael Blomkvist, is frequently referred to mockingly by his detractors as "Kalle Blomkvist", the name of a fictional teenaged detective created by Lindgren. The name Salander was actually inspired by the strong female character in the Kalle Blomkvist trilogy by Astrid Lindgren, Kalle's girlfriend Eva-Lotte Lisander.

Larsson has said when he was 15 years old, he witnessed three of his friends gang-raping a young girl, which led to his lifelong abhorrence of violence and abuse against women. His longtime partner, Eva Gabrielsson, writes that this incident "marked him for life" in a chapter of her book that describes Larsson as a feminist. The author never forgave himself for failing to help the girl, and this inspired the themes of sexual violence against women in his books. According to Gabrielsson, the Millennium trilogy allowed Larsson to express a worldview he was never able to elucidate as a journalist. She described, in great detail, how the fundamental narratives of his three books were essentially fictionalised portraits of the Sweden few people knew, a place where latent white supremacy found expression in all aspects of contemporary life, and anti-extremists lived in persistent fear of attack. "Everything of this nature described in the Millennium trilogy has happened at one time or another to a Swedish citizen, journalist, politician, public prosecutor, unionist, or policeman," she writes. "Nothing was made up."

Similarities also exist between Larsson's Lisbeth Salander and Peter O'Donnell's Modesty Blaise. Both are women from disastrous childhoods, who somehow survive to become adults with notable skills, including fighting, and who accomplish good by operating somewhat outside the law. One of Larsson's villains, Ronald Niedermann (blond hulk), has much in common with the invulnerable, sociopathic giant named Simon Delicata in the fourth Modesty Blaise book A Taste for Death.

== Awards and recognition ==
- 2005 – Glass Key award, Män som hatar kvinnor
- 2006 – Best Swedish Crime Novel Award, Flickan som lekte med elden
- 2008 – Glass Key award, Luftslottet som sprängdes
- 2008 – ITV3 Crime Thriller Award for International Author of the Year, UK, for The Girl with the Dragon Tattoo
- 2008 – Exclusive Books Boeke Prize, South Africa, for The Girl with the Dragon Tattoo
- 2009 – Galaxy British Book Awards, Books Direct Crime Thriller of the Year, UK, for The Girl with the Dragon Tattoo
- 2009 – Anthony Award, Best First Novel, for The Girl with the Dragon Tattoo
- 2009 – General Council of the Judiciary, Spain, for his contribution to the fight against domestic violence
- 2010 – USA Today's Author of the Year.

Stieg Larsson was the first author to sell more than one million e-books on Amazon.com.

== Personal life ==
His mother Vivianne also died early, in 1991, from complications of breast cancer and an aneurysm.

Eva Gabrielsson was his long-time partner, from 1974 until his death in 2004.

=== Death and will ===
Larsson died of a heart attack after climbing the stairs to work on 9 November 2004; he was 50. According to ABC News, fast food and coffee featured heavily in his diet. He is interred at the Högalid Church cemetery in the district of Södermalm in Stockholm.

In May 2008, it was announced that a 1977 will, found soon after Larsson's death, declared his wish to leave his assets to the Umeå branch of the Communist Workers League (now the Socialist Party). As the will was unwitnessed, it was not valid under Swedish law, with the result that all of Larsson's estate, including future royalties from book sales, went to his father and brother, Joakim (1957-2024). His long-term partner Eva Gabrielsson, who found the will, had no legal right to the inheritance, sparking controversy between his father and brother and her. Reportedly, the couple never married because under Swedish law those entering marriage were required to make their addresses publicly available, which may have been a "security risk" as Larsson feared retaliation from violent extremists.

An article in Vanity Fair discusses Gabrielsson's dispute with Larsson's relatives, which has also been well-covered in the Swedish press. She claims the author had little contact with his father and brother, and requests the rights to control his work so it may be presented in the way he would have wanted.

== Stieg Larsson prize ==
Since 2009, Larsson's family and Norstedts have instituted an annual award of 200,000 Swedish Kronor (US$20,600 in 2025 terms) in memory of him. The prize is awarded to a person or organisation working in Stieg Larsson's spirit.

The recipient in 2015 was Chinese author Yang Jisheng for his notable work Tombstone which describes the consequences of The Three Years of Great Chinese Famine.

== Biographies about Larsson ==
Kurdo Baksi, Larsson's former colleague at Expo, published Min vän Stieg Larsson ("My Friend Stieg Larsson") in January 2010.

Barry Forshaw's English language biography was published in April 2010.

Larsson's romantic partner, Eva Gabrielsson, released her memoir Millennium, Stieg & jag in 2011, published in English the same year as "There Are Things I Want You to Know" About Stieg Larsson and Me.

In 2012, French comics artist Frédéric Rébéna drew a graphic biography of Larsson scripted by Guillaume Lebeau and entitled Stieg Larsson, avant Millenium, which was published by Denoël Graphic.

In 2018, a study by Jan Stocklassa of Larsson's research into Olof Palme's assassination was released in Swedish, and in English the following year, translated by Tara F. Chace, under the title The Man Who Played with Fire: Stieg Larsson's Lost Files and the Hunt for an Assassin.

== Published works ==
=== Non-fiction books ===
- Stieg Larsson, Anna-Lena Lodenius: Extremhögern, Stockholm, 1991;
- Stieg Larsson, Mikael Ekman: Sverigedemokraterna: den nationella rörelsen, Stockholm, 2001;
- Stieg Larsson, Cecilia Englund: Debatten om hedersmord: feminism eller rasism, Stockholm, 2004;
- Richard Slätt, Maria Blomquist, Stieg Larsson, David Lagerlöf m.fl.: Sverigedemokraterna från insidan, 2004.

=== Novels ===
The Millennium series:

- Män som hatar kvinnor ("Men Who Hate Women"), 2005. English translation by Reg Keeland under the title The Girl with the Dragon Tattoo, January 2008. US release 16 September 2008.
- Flickan som lekte med elden ("The Girl Who Played with Fire"), 2006. English translation by Reg Keeland under the title The Girl Who Played with Fire, January 2009. US release 28 July 2009.
- Luftslottet som sprängdes ("The Air Castle That Was Blown Up"), 2007. English translation by Reg Keeland under the title The Girl Who Kicked the Hornet's Nest, October 2009 (UK release). US release date May 2010.

=== Periodicals edited ===
Science fiction fanzines:

- Sfären (with Rune Forsgren), 4 issues, 1972–1973;
- FIJAGH! (with Rune Forsgren), 9 issues, 1974–1977;
- Långfredagsnatt, 5 issues, annual 1973–1976, final issue 1983;
- Memorafiac, 2 issues, circa 1978;
- Fanac (with Eva Gabrielsson), 7 issues (numbered 97–103; earlier and later by other editors), 1979–1980;
- The Magic Fan (with Eva Gabrielsson), 2 issues, 1980.

Other:

- Svartvitt med Expo, 1999–2002;
- Expo, 2002–2004.
