= Hofsta =

Coordinates: 58.5304°N 16.2842°E

Hofsta is a mansion in Björkvik parish Katrineholm Municipality, Södermanland, Sweden.

Hofsta manor is situated on the northwestern shore of Lake Yngaren. The manor house from the 17th century is probably today the main building which got its current design in 1746. The inner wings are from the 17th century. The west wing ground floor comes from the 15th century. The other four wings are from a later period.

During the 14th and 15th centuries, it belonged in part to Hofsta Strängnäs Cathedral and Vadstena and during the 16th and 17th centuries by various noble families. In the mid-17th century, it belonged to the Privy Councillor Johan Berendes. Since then it has belonged other families including Ulfsparre, von Berchner, von Meijerhelm and Mörner. Hofsta is now owned by the family von Arnold.

The estate was used as a filming location for David Fincher's 2011 film The Girl with the Dragon Tattoo.
