= "There Are Things I Want You to Know" About Stieg Larsson and Me =

2011 memoir by Eva Gabrielsson

- First edition (Swedish)
- Translator: Linda Coverdale
- Language: Swedish, English
- Publisher: Actes Sud, Seven Stories Press
- Publication date: 2011
- English publication date: 2011

"There Are Things I Want You to Know" About Stieg Larsson and Me is a memoir written by Eva Gabrielsson, the life partner of Stieg Larsson, about life with the author and all of the complications surrounding his legacy. Larsson is best known for his posthumously published Millennium series.

== Relationship ==
Gabrielsson and Larsson met when they were 18 at an anti-Vietnam War meeting and they remained together for 32 years until his unexpected death in 2004.

== Background and contents ==
The memoir originated with a series of diary entries that Gabrielsson wrote in order to cope with the loss of her partner. It chronicles their life together and puts Larsson's life into context. The title of the book comes from a love letter that Larsson wrote to Gabrielsson when he thought he might die during a trip to Africa in 1977. The letter is included in the memoir along with the details of Larsson's trip to Africa.

Her partner, she says, was a feminist, a hopeless businessman, a journalist who could not hold down a staff job, and a passionate fighter and investigator for social causes and against the Far Right. The memoir details how the couple met and their struggles together at Expo, the anti-fascist publication Larsson founded in 1995. Larsson's crusade against Sweden's right wing fascist movements put him in constant danger and Gabrielsson writes that neo-Nazis left death threats on the couple's answering machine and sent bullets in the mail, and suggests that part of the reason the two of them never married was that it would have made Larsson an easier target for his opponents on the right.

=== Legacy issues ===
In her book, Gabrielsson also describes her struggle with Erland and Joakim Larsson, Stieg's estranged father and brother, over control of Larsson's work. Gabrielsson explains feeling "dispossessed" after Larsson's death because, as a common law partner in Sweden with no children, she had no inheritance rights. At one point, Erland and Joakim offered Gabrielsson roughly $3.3 million, but she does not want money and will continue to fight for the literary rights of Larsson's work. One source interviewed a friend who said that Gabrielsson "will not be bought." According to Gabrielsson, Larsson had written 200 pages of a fourth novel in his internationally successful Millennium series before he died; she has been seeking the legal authority to be in charge of what will happen to these 200 pages as well as with all of Larsson's literary work and success, though so far Larsson's family has refused to give her these rights. If granted the literary rights of Stieg Larsson's Millennium series, however, Gabrielsson explains that she is not sure that it is fair for a ghostwriter to complete the work that Larsson had started.

== Reception ==
The memoir received a mixed critical response. Shortly after its American publication, Publishers Weekly reported favorable reviews from David Carr in The New York Times Book Review and from The Globe and Mail. By early July 2011, the publisher reported that more than 43,000 copies were in print and that the book had appeared on the national IndieBound bestseller list and several regional lists.

Other reviewers were more critical of the book's structure and emphasis. Evelyn McDonnell of the Los Angeles Times argued that it functioned more as Gabrielsson's case in the dispute over Larsson's literary estate than as a full portrait of Larsson, while still noting its account of the couple's shared commitments to feminism, anti-racism and left-wing politics. Maureen Corrigan, writing in The Washington Post, found the memoir stylistically fragmented and uneven, but regarded Gabrielsson's account of her grief following Larsson's death as its most affecting material.

== Publication ==
The memoir was written in Swedish and was first published by Actes Sud in 2011. It was translated into English by Linda Coverdale and published by Seven Stories Press also in 2011.
