= The Girl with the Dragon Tattoo (2011 film) =

2011 neo-noir mystery thriller film by David Fincher

- Theatrical release poster
- Directed by: David Fincher
- Screenplay by: Steven Zaillian
- Based on: The Girl with the Dragon Tattoo by Stieg Larsson
- Produced by: Scott Rudin; Ole Søndberg; Søren Stærmose; Ceán Chaffin
- Starring: Daniel Craig; Rooney Mara; Christopher Plummer; Stellan Skarsgård; Steven Berkoff; Robin Wright; Yorick van Wageningen; Joely Richardson
- Cinematography: Jeff Cronenweth
- Edited by: Kirk Baxter; Angus Wall
- Music by: Trent Reznor; Atticus Ross
- Production companies: Columbia Pictures; Metro-Goldwyn-Mayer Pictures; Scott Rudin Productions; Yellow Bird
- Distributed by: Sony Pictures Releasing
- Release dates: December 12, 2011 (Odeon Leicester Square); December 21, 2011 (United States); December 21, 2011 (Sweden)
- Running time: 158 minutes
- Countries: Sweden; United States
- Language: English
- Budget: $90 million
- Box office: $233 million

The Girl with the Dragon Tattoo is a 2011 thriller film directed by David Fincher from a screenplay by Steven Zaillian. It is based on the 2005 novel of the same name by Stieg Larsson. Starring Daniel Craig as journalist Mikael Blomkvist and Rooney Mara as Lisbeth Salander, it tells the story of Blomkvist's investigation to find out what happened to a girl from a wealthy family who had disappeared 40 years earlier. He recruits the help of Salander, a computer hacker.

Sony Pictures began development on the film in 2009. It took the company a few months to obtain the film adaptation rights to the novel, while also recruiting Zaillian and Fincher. The casting process for the lead roles was intense; Craig faced scheduling conflicts, and a number of actresses were sought for the role of Lisbeth Salander. The script took over six months to write, which included three months of analyzing the novel.

The Girl with the Dragon Tattoo premiered at Odeon Leicester Square in London on December 12, 2011, and was released in the United States on December 21, by Sony Pictures Releasing. The film grossed $233 million against a $90 million production budget and received acclaim from critics, with praise for Craig and Mara's performances as well as Fincher's direction, the score, and the film's tone and visuals. The film was chosen by the National Board of Review as one of the top ten films of 2011 and was a candidate for numerous awards, winning, among others, the Academy Award for Best Film Editing, while Mara's performance earned her a nomination for the Academy Award for Best Actress at the 84th Academy Awards.

A soft reboot and sequel, The Girl in the Spider's Web, was released in October 2018.

== Plot ==
In Stockholm, journalist Mikael Blomkvist is recovering from the legal and professional fallout of a libel suit brought against him by businessman Hans-Erik Wennerström. The wealthy Henrik Vanger offers to give Blomkvist evidence against Wennerström in exchange for the performance of an unusual task: investigating the 40-year-old disappearance and presumed murder of Henrik's grandniece, 16-year-old Harriet.

Harriet had always given Vanger a framed pressed flower on his birthday, and he has continued to receive them every year since she disappeared. He believes her killer is taunting him. Blomkvist moves into a cottage on the Vanger family's island estate and starts his investigation.

Lisbeth Salander is an asocial investigator and hacker who is antagonized by her state-appointed guardian, Nils Bjurman. Bjurman controls Salander's finances and extorts sexual favors by threatening to have her institutionalized. In one meeting, Bjurman chains Salander to his bed and brutally anally rapes her, unaware that she is recording his actions. At their next meeting, Salander tasers Bjurman, binds him, rapes him with a steel dildo, and tattoos an ignominious message across his chest. Using the recording she made, she blackmails him into giving her financial independence and ceasing contact with her.

Blomkvist explores the island and interviews Vanger's relatives living there, many of whom were Nazis or Nazi sympathizers during World War II. He uncovers a list of names and numbers that he learns are Bible verse references. Blomkvist recruits Salander as his research assistant, and she discovers a connection between the list and a number of young women brutally murdered from 1947 to 1967 across Sweden, which suggests the activity of a serial killer. Many of the victims had given names from the Old Testament, leading her to theorize that they were Jewish and that the murders were motivated by anti-semitism.

One morning, Blomkvist finds his cat's mutilated corpse on the doorstep. Another time, someone shoots at him, the bullet grazing his forehead. After Salander tends to his wound, she initiates sex.

Investigating separate leads, Blomkvist and Salander both deduce that Harriet's late father, Gottfried, committed the first murders and Martin, her brother, those that took place after Gottfried's death. While looking for more proof in Martin's house, Blomkvist is caught by him, gassed unconscious, and restrained in a specially prepared basement. Martin brags about killing and raping women for decades, like his father, but denies knowing what happened to Harriet. As Martin prepares to kill Blomkvist, Salander arrives and wounds Martin, forcing him to flee in his car. Pursued by Salander on her motorcycle, Martin drives off the road and hits a propane tank, which explodes and kills him. As she nurses Blomkvist back to health, Salander, who has become emotionally attached to him, reveals that she was institutionalized after attempting to burn her father alive as a child.

Blomkvist and Salander deduce that Harriet is alive and in hiding, and they find her in London. Harriet reveals that Gottfried sexually abused both her and Martin for an entire year before she defended herself by drowning him when she was 14. After witnessing Harriet kill their father, Martin continued to sexually abuse her. Her cousin Anita smuggled her off the island and let Harriet assume her identity in London; Anita and her husband were later killed in a car accident. Finally free of her brother, Harriet returns to Sweden and tearfully reunites with Henrik.

Henrik gives Blomkvist the promised information against Wennerström, but it proves to be outdated, and any statutes of limitations have run out. Salander reveals that she has hacked Wennerström's accounts and discovered he is laundering money for various criminal syndicates. She gives Blomkvist evidence of Wennerström's crimes, which Blomkvist publishes in a scathing editorial, ruining Wennerström and bringing Blomkvist to national prominence. Salander, in disguise, travels to Switzerland and removes two billion euros from Wennerström's secret accounts. Wennerström is later murdered in an apparent gangland shooting.

On her way to give Blomkvist a Christmas present, Salander sees him being affectionate with his boss and long-time lover, Erika Berger. She discards the gift and rides away on her motorcycle.

== Cast ==
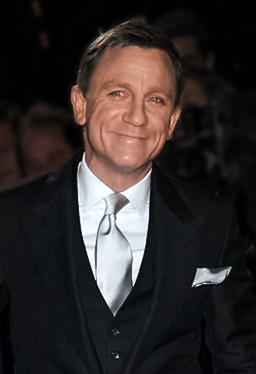
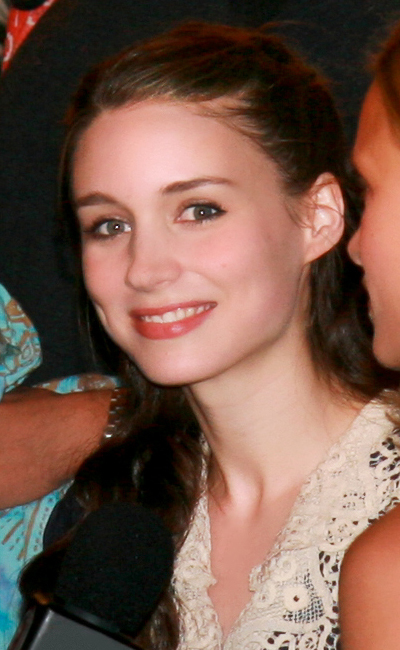
Daniel Craig (left) and Rooney Mara respectively portray Mikael Blomkvist and Lisbeth Salander.
- Daniel Craig as Mikael Blomkvist: An investigative journalist and the co-owner of Swedish magazine Millennium who takes on the case of Henrik Vanger's missing grandniece. Blomkvist is devoted to exposing the corruptions and malfeasance of government, attracting infamy for his tendency to "go too far".
- Rooney Mara as Lisbeth Salander: An asocial computer hacker who has survived severe emotional and sexual abuse since her childhood. The character was a "vulnerable victim-turned-vigilante" with the "take-no-prisoners" attitude of Lara Croft and the "cool, unsentimental intellect" of Spock. David Fincher felt that Salander's eccentric persona was enthralling, and stated, "there's a kind of wish fulfillment to her in the way that she takes care of things, the way she will only put up with so much, but there are other sides to her as well."
- Christopher Plummer as Henrik Vanger: The retired CEO of Vanger Industries who launches an extensive investigation into his family's affairs, with hopes of discovering what happened to his grandniece, Harriet. Despite calling the Vanger family "dysfunctional", Plummer said of the character: "I love the character of the old man, and I sympathize with him. He's really the nicest old guy in the whole book. Everybody is a bit suspect, and still are at the end. Old Vanger has a nice straight line, and he gets his wish." Plummer wanted to imbue the character with irony, an element he found to be absent from the novel's Henrik. "I think that the old man would have it," he opined, "because he's a very sophisticated old guy [...] used to a great deal of power. So in dealing with people, he would be very good [...] he would be quite jokey, and know how to seduce them." Julian Sands portrays a young Henrik Vanger.
- Stellan Skarsgård as Martin Vanger: Henrik's grandnephew, Harriet's brother and the current CEO of Vanger Industries. Skarsgård was allured by the character's dual nature, and was fascinated that he got to portray him in "two totally different ways". Regarding Martin's "very complex" and "complicated" personality, the Swedish actor said, "He can be extremely charming, but he also can seem to be a completely different person at different points in the film." While consulting with Fincher, the director wanted Skarsgård to play Martin without reference to the book.
- Steven Berkoff as Dirch Frode, Head Legal Counsel for Vanger Industries
- Robin Wright as Erika Berger: Blomkvist's business partner and editor-in-chief of Millennium magazine. She is also Blomkvist's occasional lover.
- Yorick van Wageningen as Nils Bjurman: Salander's sexually abusive legal guardian. Fincher wanted the character to be worse than a typical antagonist, although he did not want to emulate the stereotypical "mustache-twirling pervert". The director considered Van Wageningen to be the embodiment of a versatile actor—one who was a "full-fledged human being" and a "brilliant" actor. "He was able to bring his performance from a logical place in Bjurman's mind and find the seething morass of darkness inside," Fincher stated. Bjurman's multifaceted psyche was the main reason Van Wageningen wanted to play the role. The Dutch actor said, "This character goes through a lot and I wasn't quite sure I wanted to go through all that. I started out half way between the elation of getting to work with David Fincher and the dread of this character, but I was able to use both of those things. We both thought the most interesting route would be for Bjurman to seem half-affable. The challenge was not in finding the freak violence in the guy but finding the humanity of him."
- Joely Richardson as Harriet Vanger: Henrik's long-lost grandniece (Henrik's brother's grand daughter) who went into hiding posing as her cousin Anita. In performing her "tricky" character, Richardson recalled that Fincher wanted her to embrace a "darker, edgier" persona, without sugarcoating, and not "resolved or healed". "Even if you were starting to move towards the direction of resolved or healed, he still wanted it edgy and dark. There are no straightforward emotions in the world of this film." Moa Garpendal portrays a young Harriet Vanger.
- Goran Višnjić as Dragan Armansky, head of Milton Security, Salander's employer
- Donald Sumpter as Detective Morell. David Dencik portrays a young Morell.
- Ulf Friberg as Hans-Erik Wennerström, CEO of the Wennerström Group
- Geraldine James as Cecilia Vanger, Henrik Vanger's niece, Harald's daughter
- Embeth Davidtz as Annika Giannini, Mikael's sister and a lawyer
- Josefin Asplund as Pernilla Blomkvist, Mikael's daughter
- Per Myrberg as Harald Vanger, Henrik's nazi brother. Gustaf Hammarsten portrays a young Harald.
- Arly Jover as Liv, Martin's girlfriend
- Tony Way as Plague, Salander's hacker friend
- Fredrik Dolk as Bertil Camnermarker, Counsel for the Wennerström Group
- Alan Dale as Detective Isaksson
- Leo Bill as Trinity, another of Salander's hacker friends
- Élodie Yung as Miriam Wu, Salander's occasional lover
- Joel Kinnaman as Christer Malm, a journalist at Millennium

== Production ==
=== Conception and writing ===
The success of Stieg Larsson's novel created Hollywood interest in adapting the book, as became apparent in 2009 when Sony's Michael Lynton and Amy Pascal pursued the idea of developing an "American" version unrelated to the Swedish film adaptation released that year. By December, two major developments occurred for the project: Steven Zaillian, who had recently completed the script for Moneyball (2011), became the screenwriter, while producer Scott Rudin finalized a partnership allocating full copyrights to Sony. Zaillian, who was unfamiliar with the novel, got a copy from Rudin. The screenwriter recalled, "They sent it to me and said, 'We want to do this. We will think of it as one thing for now. It's possible that it can be two and three, but let's concentrate on this one.'" After reading the book, the screenwriter did no research on the subject. David Fincher, who was requested with partner Ceán Chaffin by Sony executives to read the novel, was astounded by the Millennium series' size and success. As they began to read, the duo noticed that it had a tendency to take "readers on a lot of side trips"—"from detailed explanations of surveillance techniques to angry attacks on corrupt Swedish industrialists," professed The Hollywood Reporter's Gregg Kilday. Fincher recalled of the encounter: "The ballistic, ripping-yarn thriller aspect of it is kind of a red herring in a weird way. It is the thing that throws Salander and Blomkvist together, but it is their relationship you keep coming back to. I was just wondering what 350 pages Zaillian would get rid of." Because Zaillian was already cultivating the screenplay, the director avoided interfering. After a conversation, Fincher was comfortable "they were headed in the same direction".

"I imagined someone who could move through the streets of Stockholm almost invisibly even though she looks the way she looks ... it's almost like a forcefield"

— Steven Zaillian

The writing process consumed approximately six months, including three months creating notes and analyzing the novel. Zaillian noted that, as time progressed, the writing accelerated. "As soon as you start making decisions," he explained, "you start cutting off all of the other possibilities of things that could happen. So with every decision that you make you are removing a whole bunch of other possibilities of where that story can go or what that character can do." Given the book's sizable length, Zaillian deleted elements to match Fincher's desired running time. Even so, Zaillan took significant departures from the book. To Zaillian, there was always a "low-grade" anxiety, "but I was never doing anything specifically to please or displease," he continued. "I was simply trying to tell the story the best way I could, and push that out of my mind. I didn't change anything just for the sake of changing it. There's a lot right about the book, but that part, I thought we could do it a different way, and it could be a nice surprise for the people that have read it."

Zaillian discussed many of the themes in Larsson's Millennium series with Fincher, taking the pair deeper into the novel's darker subjects, such as the psychological dissimilarities between rapists and murderers. Fincher was familiar with the concept, from projects such as Seven (1995) and Zodiac (2007). Zaillian commented, "A rapist, or at least our rapist, is about exercising his power over somebody. A serial killer is about destruction; they get off on destroying something. It's not about having power over something, it's about eliminating it. What thrills them is slightly different." The duo wanted to expose the novels' pivotal themes, particularly misogyny. "We were committed to the tack that this is a movie about violence against women about specific kinds of degradation, and you can't shy away from that. But at the same time you have to walk a razor thin line so that the audience can viscerally feel the need for revenge but also see the power of the ideas being expressed." Instead of the typical three-act structure, they reluctantly chose a five-act structure, which Fincher pointed out is "very similar to a lot of TV cop dramas."

=== Casting ===
Daniel Craig competed with George Clooney, Johnny Depp, Viggo Mortensen and Brad Pitt as candidates for the role of Mikael Blomkvist. Initial concerns over schedule conflicts with the production of Cowboys & Aliens (2011) and Skyfall (2012) prompted Craig to postpone the casting process. Given the uncertainty surrounding Skyfall following Metro-Goldwyn-Mayer's bankruptcy, Sony Pictures Entertainment and DreamWorks worked out a schedule and Craig agreed to take the part. The British actor was required to gain weight and adopted a neutral accent to befit Stockholm's worldly cultural fabric. Having read the book amid its "initial craze", Craig commented, "It's one of those books you just don't put down" [...] There's just this immediate feeling that bad things are going to happen and I think that's part of why they've been so readable for people."

Casting of Lisbeth Salander was complicated by the raft of prominent candidates such as Emily Browning, Eva Green, Anne Hathaway, Scarlett Johansson, Keira Knightley, Jennifer Lawrence, Carey Mulligan, Elliot Page, Natalie Portman, Léa Seydoux, Vanessa Hudgens, Sophie Lowe, Sarah Snook, Kristen Stewart, Olivia Thirlby, Mia Wasikowska, Emma Watson, Evan Rachel Wood and Yolandi Visser; Lowe, Rooney Mara, Seydoux, and Snook were the final four candidates. Despite the hype, some eventually withdrew from consideration due to the time commitment and low pay. Mara had worked with Fincher in his 2010 film The Social Network. Fincher, while fond of the actress' youthful appearance, found it difficult at first to mold her to match Salander's antisocial demeanor, which was a vast contrast from her earlier role as the personable Erica Albright. Mara went through multiple changes in her appearance to become Salander. Her hair was dyed black and cut into various jagged points, giving the appearance that she cut it herself. In addition to her transgressive appearance, which was described as a "mash-up of brazen Seventies punk and spooky Eighties goth with a dash of S&M temptress" by Lynn Hirschberg of W, Mara participated in a formal screening and was filmed by Fincher on a subway in Los Angeles in an effort to persuade the executives of Sony Pictures that she was a credible choice.

=== Filming ===
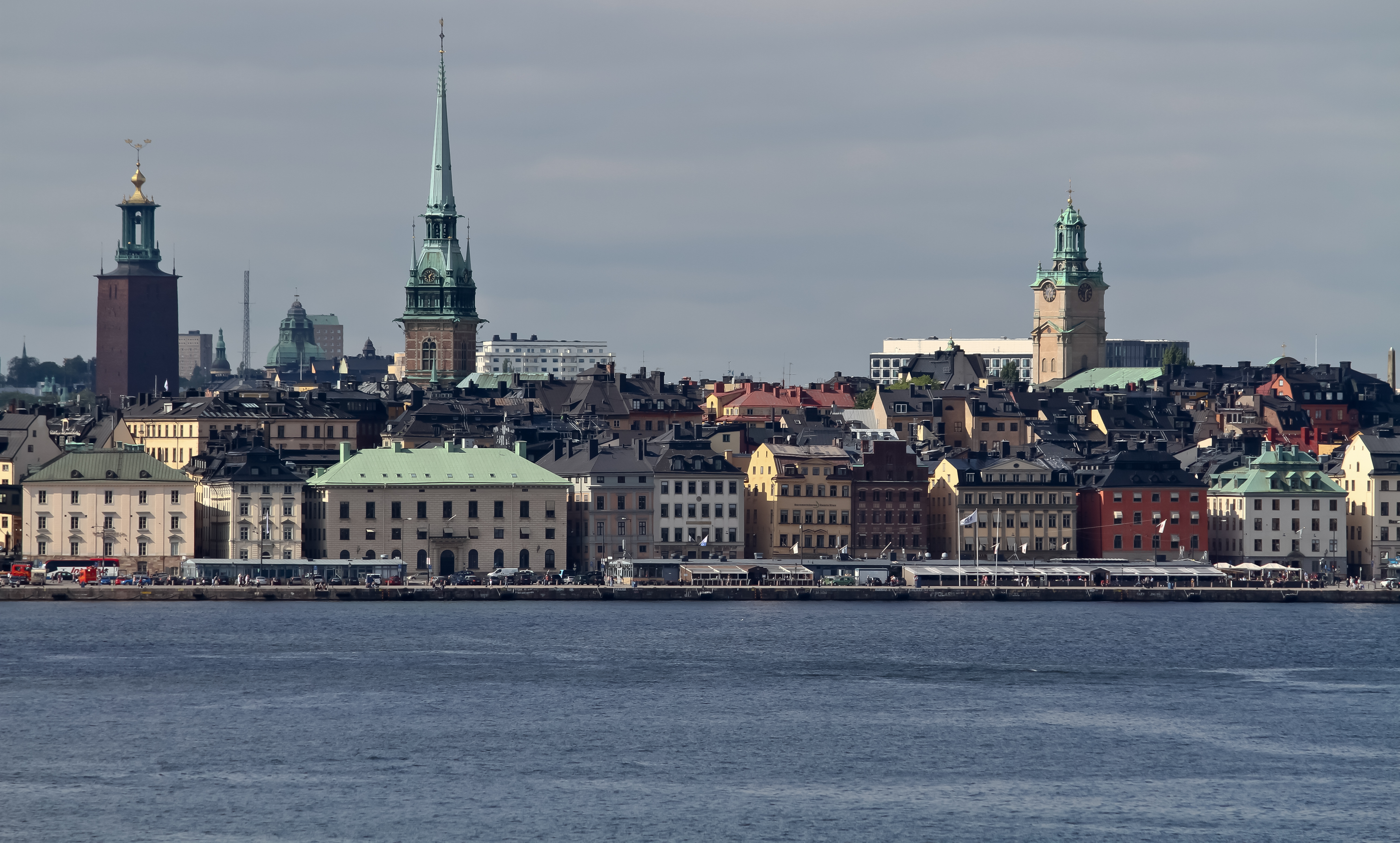
Stockholm, Sweden provided for much of the setting of The Girl with the Dragon Tattoo.

Fincher and Zaillian's central objective was to maintain the novel's setting. To portray Larsson's vision of Sweden, and the interaction of light on its landscape, Fincher cooperated with an artistic team that included cinematographer Jeff Cronenweth and production designer Donald Graham Burt. The film was wholly shot using Red Digital Cinema Camera Company's RED MX digital camera, chosen to help evoke Larsson's tone. The idea, according to Cronenweth, was to employ unorthodox light sources and maintain a realistic perspective. "So there may be shadows, there may be flaws, but its reality. You allow silhouettes and darkness, but at the same time we also wanted shots to counter that, so it would not all be one continuous dramatic image." Sweden's climate was a crucial element in enhancing the mood. Cronenweth commented, "It's always an element in the background and it was very important that you feel it as an audience member. The winter becomes like a silent character in the film giving everything a low, cool-colored light that is super soft and non-direct." To get acquainted with Swedish culture, Burt set out on a month-long expedition across the country. He said of the process, "It takes time to start really taking in the nuances of a culture, to start seeing the themes that recur in the architecture, the landscape, the layouts of the cities and the habits of the people. I felt I had to really integrate myself into this world to develop a true sense of place for the film. It was not just about understanding the physicality of the locations, but the metaphysics of them, and how the way people live comes out through design."

Principal photography began in Stockholm, Sweden in September 2010. Production mostly took place at multiple locations in the city's central business district, including at the Stockholm Court House. One challenge was realizing the Vanger estate. They picked an eighteenth-century French architecture mansion, Hofsta, located approximately 60 miles (97 km) southwest of Stockholm. Filmmakers wanted to use a typical "manor from Småland" that was solemn, formal, and "very Old Money". "The Swedish are very good at the modern and the minimal but they also have these wonderful country homes that can be juxtaposed against the modern city—yet both speak to money." Principal photography relocated in October to Uppsala. On Queen Street, the facade of the area was renovated to mimic the Hotel Alder, after an old photograph of a building obtained by Fincher. From December onward, production moved to Zurich, Switzerland, where locations were established at Dolder Grand Hotel and the Zurich Airport. Because of the "beautiful" environment of the city, Fincher found it difficult to film in the area. Principal photography concluded in Oslo, Norway, where production took place at Oslo Airport, Gardermoen. Recorded for over fifteen hours, twelve extras were sought for background roles. Filming also took place in London, United Kingdom.

In one sequence the character Martin Vanger (Stellan Skarsgård) plays the song "Orinoco Flow" by Enya before beginning his torture of Mikael Blomkvist. David Fincher, the director, said that he believed that Martin "doesn't like to kill, he doesn't like to hear the screams, without hearing his favorite music" so therefore the character should play a song during the scene. Daniel Craig, the actor who played Blomkvist, selected "Orinoco Flow" on his iPod as a candidate song. Fincher said "And we all almost pissed ourselves, we were laughing so hard. No, actually, it's worse than that. He said, ‘Orinoco Flow!’ Everybody looked at each other, like, what is he talking about? And he said, ‘You know, "Sail away, sail away..."’ And I thought, this guy is going to make Blomkvist as metro as we need."

==== Title sequence ====
In the "Hot Hands" vignette, the rough, gnarled hands caressing Salander's face represents systemic abuse of women by men.

Tim Miller, creative director for the title sequence, wanted to develop an abstract narrative that reflected the pivotal moments in the novel, as well as the character development of Lisbeth Salander. It was arduous for Miller to conceptualize the sequence abstractly, given that Salander's occupation was a distinctive part of her personality. His initial ideas were modeled after a keyboard. "We were going to treat the keyboard like this giant city with massive fingers pressing down on the keys," Miller explained, "Then we transitioned to the liquid going through the giant obelisks of the keys." Among Miller's many vignettes was "The Hacker Inside", which revealed the character's inner disposition and melted them away. The futuristic qualities in the original designs provided for a much more cyberpunk appearance than the final product. In creating the "cyber" look for Salander, Miller said, "Every time I would show David a design he would say, 'More Tandy!' It's the shitty little computers from Radio Shack, the Tandy computers. They probably had vacuum tubes in them, really old technology. And David would go 'More Tandy', until we ended up with something that looked like we glued a bunch of computer parts found at a junkyard together."

Fincher wanted the vignette to be a "personal nightmare" for Salander, replaying her darkest moments. "Early on, we knew it was supposed to feel like a nightmare," Miller professed, who commented that early on in the process, Fincher wanted to use an artwork as a template for the sequence. After browsing through various paintings to no avail, Fincher chose a painting that depicted the artist, covered in black paint, standing in the middle of a gallery. Many of Miller's sketches contained a liquid-like component, and were rewritten to produce the "gooey" element that was so desired. "David said let's just put liquid in all of them and it will be this primordial dream ooze that's a part of every vignette," Miller recalled. "It ties everything together other than the black on black."

The title sequence includes abundant references to the novel, and exposes several political themes. Salander's tattoos, such as her phoenix and dragon tattoos, were incorporated. The multiple flower representations signified the biological life cycle, as well as Henrik, who received a pressed flower each year on his birthday. "One had flowers coming out of this black ooze," said Fincher, "it blossoms, and then it dies. And then a different flower, as that one is dying is rising from the middle of it. It was supposed to represent this cycle of the killer sending flowers." Ultimately, the vignette becomes very conceptual because Miller and his team took "a whole thought, and cut it up into multiple different shots that are mixed in with other shots". In one instance, Blomkvist is strangled by strips of newspaper, a metaphor for the establishment squelching his exposes.

In the "Hot Hands" vignette, a pair of rough, distorted hands that embrace Salander's face and melt it represent all that's bad in men. The hands that embrace Blomkvist's face and shatter it, represent wealth and power. Themes of domestic violence become apparent as a woman's face shatters after a merciless beating; this also ties in the brutal beating of Salander's mother Agneta Salander by her father Alexander Zalachenko, an event revealed in the sequel, The Girl Who Played with Fire (2006).

A cover of Led Zeppelin's "Immigrant Song" (1970) plays throughout the title sequence. The rendition was produced by soundtrack composers Atticus Ross and Nine Inch Nails member Trent Reznor, and features vocals from Yeah Yeah Yeahs lead singer Karen O. Fincher suggested the song, but Reznor agreed only at his request. Led Zeppelin licensed the song only for use in the film's trailer and title sequence. Fincher stated that he sees title sequences as an opportunity to set the stage for the film, or to get an audience to let go of its preconceptions.

Software packages that were primarily used are 3ds Max (for modeling, lighting, rendering), Softimage (for rigging and animation), Digital Fusion (for compositing), Real Flow (for fluid dynamics), Sony Vegas (for editorial), ZBrush and Mudbox (for organic modeling), and VRAY (for rendering).

=== Soundtrack ===
"[The instrumental sounds are] processed and stretched and manipulated into a setting where it may sound harmonically familiar, but if you tune into it, it's not behaving in a way that you're accustomed to that type of sound behaving. I find experimenting around in that is an interesting place to work."

— Trent Reznor

Fincher recruited Reznor and Ross to produce the score; aside from their successful collaboration on The Social Network, the duo had worked together on albums from Nine Inch Nails' later discography. They dedicated much of the year to work on the film, as they felt it would appeal to a broad audience. Akin to his efforts in The Social Network, Reznor experiments with acoustics and blends them with elements of electronic music, resulting in a foreboding atmosphere. "We wanted to create the sound of coldness—emotionally and also physically," he asserted, "We wanted to take lots of acoustic instruments [...] and transplant them into a very inorganic setting, and dress the set around them with electronics."

Even before viewing the script, Reznor and Ross opted to use a redolent approach to creating the film's score. After discussing with Fincher the varying soundscapes and emotions, the duo spent six weeks composing. "We composed music we felt might belong," stated the Nine Inch Nails lead vocalist, "and then we'd run it by Fincher, to see where his head's at and he responded positively. He was filming at this time last year and assembling rough edits of scenes to see what it feels like, and he was inserting our music at that point, rather than using temp music, which is how it usually takes place, apparently." Finding a structure for the soundtrack was arguably the most strenuous task. "We weren't working on a finished thing, so everything keeps moving around, scenes are changing in length, and even the order of things are shuffled around, and that can get pretty frustrating when you get precious about your work. It was a lesson we learned pretty quickly of, 'Everything is in flux, and approach it as such. Hopefully it’ll work out in the end.'"

== Marketing ==
=== Websites ===
During production of the film, Sony created a Tumblr blog to see behind the scenes activities from the production of the soundtrack, costumes and set design. This use of guerrilla marketing was used to draw fans in with its mysterious nature as to allude to hidden websites which contained encrypted messages. Found throughout these websites were new photos of props and when found, prizes would be awarded. This tactic seemed to represent a similar style of an alternative reality game.

=== Clothing line ===
Promotional material

Trish Summerville, the costume designer for The Girl With The Dragon Tattoo, collaborated with the clothing brand H&M to release a Lisbeth Salander inspired clothing collection which was announced on October 27, 2011. The collection consisted of "Leather motorcycle jackets, faux leather pants, t-shirts and a few varieties of shoes, including boots with studs and grey tennis shoes." Of which the pieces were meant to appear as cyberpunk-esque, but also lived-in and gritty. The collection first appeared at the Paris-based boutique Collete on November 28, 2011, which was then opened to several H&M locations on December 14, 2011. Journalists praised the release for its uses of a 'cross-promotional’ strategy.

== Release ==
=== Pre-release ===
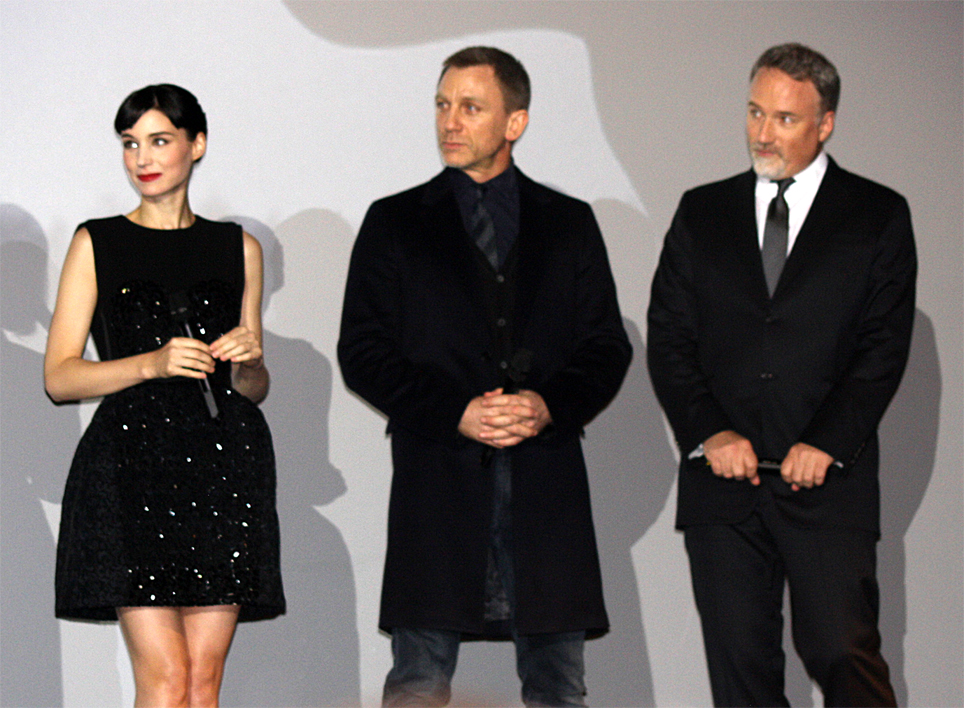
Mara, Craig, and Fincher at the French premiere of The Girl with the Dragon Tattoo in Paris

A screening for The Girl with the Dragon Tattoo took place on November 28, 2011, as part of a critics-only event hosted by the New York Film Critics Circle. Commentators at the event predicted that while the film would become a contender for several accolades, it would likely not become a forerunner in the pursuit for Academy Award nominations. The worldwide premiere was at the London's Odeon Leicester Square on December 12, 2011, followed by the American opening at the Ziegfeld Theatre in New York City on December 14 and Stockholm the next day. Sony's target demographics were men and women over the age of 25 and 17–34. The film went into general release in North America on December 21, at 2,700 theaters, expanding to 2,974 theaters on its second day. The United Kingdom release was on December 26, Russia on January 1, 2012, and Japan on February 13. India and Vietnam releases were abandoned due to censorship concerns. A press statement from the Central Board of Film Certification stated: "Sony Pictures will not be releasing The Girl with the Dragon Tattoo in India. The censor board has judged the film unsuitable for public viewing in its unaltered form and, while we are committed to maintaining and protecting the vision of the director, we will, as always, respect the guidelines set by the board." In contrast, the National Film Board of Vietnam insisted that the film's withdrawal had no relation to rigid censorship guidelines, as it had not been reviewed by the committee.

=== Home media ===
Sony Pictures Home Entertainment released the film in a DVD and Blu-ray disc combo pack in the United States on March 20, 2012. Bonus features include a commentary from Fincher, featurettes on Blomkvist, Salander, the sets and locations, etc. The disc artwork for the DVD version of the film resembles a Sony brand DVD-R, a reference to the hacker Lisbeth Salander. This caused a bit of confusion in the marketplace with consumers thinking they had obtained a bootleg copy. The release sold 644,000 copies in its first week, in third place behind The Muppets and Hop. The following week, the film sold an additional 144,000 copies generating $2.59 million in gross revenue. As of January 2014, 1,478,230 units had been sold, grossing $22,195,069.

== Reception ==
=== Box office ===
Fincher's film grossed $233 million during its theatrical run. The film's American release grossed $1.6 million from its Tuesday night screenings, a figure that increased to $3.5 million by the end of its first day of general release. It maintained momentum into its opening weekend, accumulating $13 million for a total of $21 million in domestic revenue. The film's debut figures fell below media expectations. Aided by positive word of mouth, its commercial performance remained steady into the second week, posting $19 million from 2,914 theaters. The third week saw box office drop 24% to $11.3 million, totaling $76.8 million. The number of theaters slightly increased to 2,950. By the fifth week, the number of theaters shrank to 1,907, and grosses to $3.7 million, though it remained within the national top ten. The film completed its North American theatrical run on March 22, 2012, earning over $103 million.

The international debut was in six Scandinavian markets on December 19–25, 2011, securing $1.6 million from 480 venues. In Sweden the film opened in 194 theaters to strong results, accounting for more than half of international revenue at the time ($950,000). The first full week in the United Kingdom collected $6.7 million from 920 theaters. By the weekend of January 6–8, 2012, the film grossed $12.2 million for a total of $29 million; this included its expansion into Hong Kong, where it topped the box office, earning $470,000 from thirty-six establishments. The film similarly led the field in South Africa. It accumulated $6.6 million from an estimated 600 theaters over a seven-day period in Russia, placing fifth. The expansion continued into the following week, opening in nine markets. The week of January 13–15 saw the film yield $16.1 million from 3,910 locations in over forty-three territories, thus propelling the international gross to $49.3 million. It debuted at second place in Austria and Germany, where in the latter, it pulled $2.9 million from 525 locations. Similar results were achieved in Australia, where it reached 252 theaters. The film's momentum continued throughout the month, and by January 22, it had hit ten additional markets, including France and Mexico, from which it drew $3.25 million from 540 venues and $1.25 million from 540 theaters, respectively. In its second week in France it descended to number three, with a total gross of $5.8 million.

The next major international release came in Japan on February 13, where it opened in first place with $3.68 million (¥288 million) in 431 theaters. By the weekend of February 17–19, the film had scooped up $119.5 million from international markets. The total international gross for The Girl with the Dragon Tattoo was $130.1 million. MGM, one of the studios involved in the production, posted a "modest loss" and declared that they had expected the film to gross at least 10% more.

=== Critical response ===
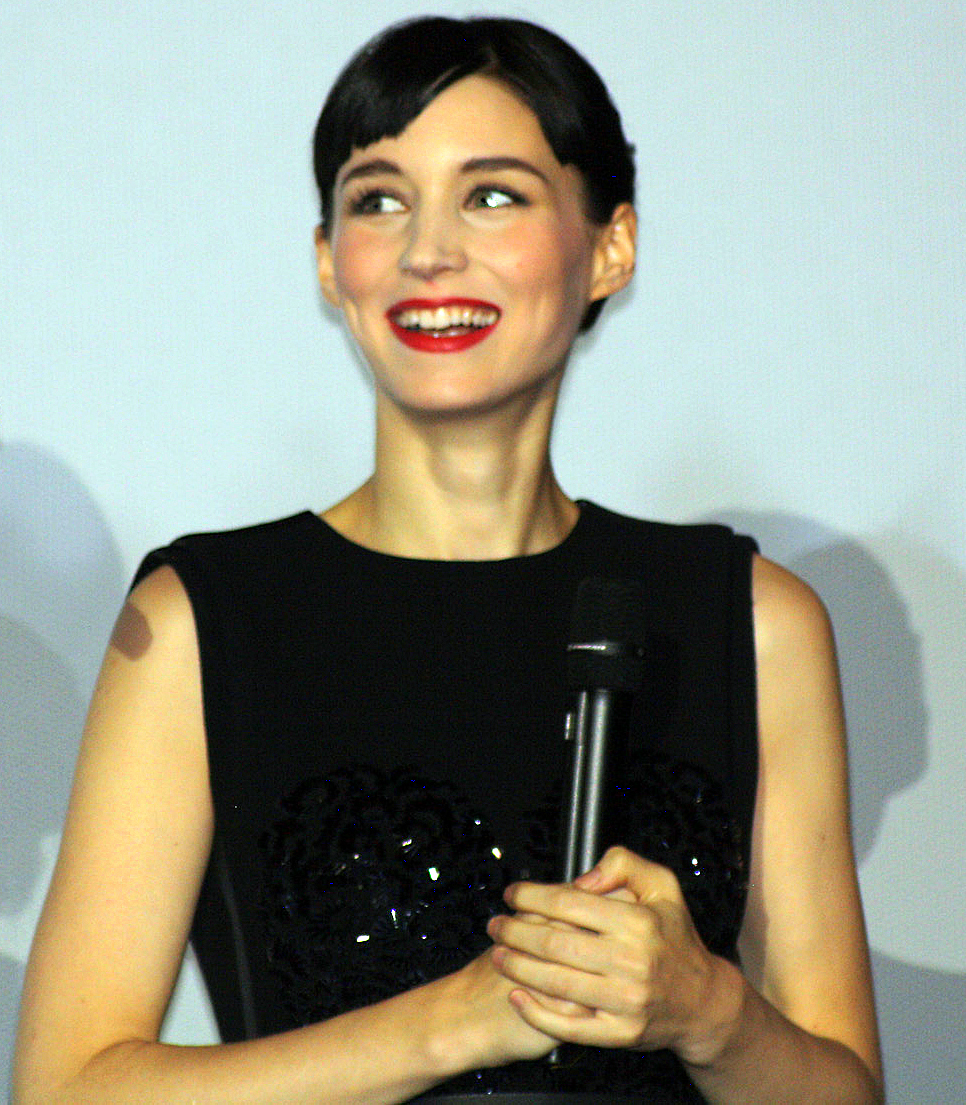
Rooney Mara's performance as Lisbeth Salander was lauded by critics, and earned her a nomination for the Academy Award for Best Actress.

The Girl with the Dragon Tattoo received widespread critical acclaim, with particular praise for the cast, tone, score and cinematography. Review aggregation website Rotten Tomatoes reported an approval rating of 86% based on 259 reviews, with an average rating of 7.6/10. The site's critics consensus states, "Brutal yet captivating, The Girl with the Dragon Tattoo is the result of David Fincher working at his lurid best with total role commitment from star Rooney Mara." Metacritic assigned the film a weighted average score of 71 out of 100, based on 41 critics, indicating "generally favorable reviews". Audiences polled by CinemaScore gave the film an average grade of "A" on an A+ to F scale.

David Denby of The New Yorker asserted that the austere, but captivating installment presented a "glancing, chilled view" of a world where succinct moments of loyalty coexisted with constant trials of betrayal. To USA Today columnist Claudia Puig, Fincher captures the "menace and grim despair in the frosty Scandinavian landscape" by carefully approaching its most gruesome features. Puig noted a surfeit of "stylistic flourishes" and "intriguing" changes in the narrative, compared to the original film. In his three-and-a-half star review, Chris Knight of the National Post argued that it epitomized a so-called "paradoxical position" that was both "immensely enjoyable and completely unnecessary". Rene Rodriguez of The Miami Herald said that the "fabulously sinister entertainment" surpassed the original film "in every way". The film took two and a half stars from Rolling Stone commentator Peter Travers, who concluded: "Fincher's Girl is gloriously rendered but too impersonal to leave a mark." A. O. Scott, writing for The New York Times, admired the moments of "brilliantly orchestrated" anxiety and confusion, but felt that The Girl with the Dragon Tattoo was vulnerable to the "lumbering proceduralism" that he saw in its literary counterpart, as evident with the "long stretches of drab, hackneyed exposition that flatten the atmosphere". The Wall Street Journal's Joe Morgenstern praised Cronenweth's cinematography, which he thought provided for glossy alterations in the film's darkness; "Stockholm glitters in nighttime exteriors, and its subway shines in a spectacular spasm of action involving a backpack." Rex Reed of The New York Observer professed that despite its occasional incomprehensibility, the movie was "technically superb" and "superbly acted".

The performances were a frequent topic in the critiques. Mara's performance, in particular, was admired by commentators. A revelation in the eyes of Entertainment Weekly's Owen Gleiberman, he proclaimed that her character was more important than "her ability to solve a crime". Her "hypnotic" portrayal was noted by Justin Chang of Variety, as well as Salon critic Andrew O'Hehir, who wrote, "Rooney Mara is a revelation as Lisbeth Salander, the damaged, aggressive computer geek and feminist revenge angel, playing the character as far more feral and vulnerable than Noomi Rapace’s borderline-stereotype sexpot Goth girl." Scott Tobias of The A.V. Club enjoyed the chemistry between Mara and Craig, as did David Germain of the Associated Press; "Mara and Craig make an indomitable screen pair, he nominally leading their intense search into decades-old serial killings, she surging ahead, plowing through obstacles with flashes of phenomenal intellect and eruptions of physical fury." Although Puig found Mara inferior to Rapace in playing Salander, with regard to Craig's performance, he said that the actor shone. This was supported by Morgenstern, who avouched that Craig "nonetheless finds welcome humor in Mikael's impassive affect". Roger Ebert of the Chicago Sun-Times said the film was given a more assured quality than the original because of Fincher's direction and the lead performances, although he believed this did not always work to the film's advantage, preferring the original version's "less confident surface" where "emotions were closer to the surface."

=== Accolades ===
In addition to numerous awards, The Girl with the Dragon Tattoo was included on several year-end lists by film commentators and publications. It was named the best film of 2011 by MTV and James Berardinelli of ReelViews. The former wrote, "The director follows up the excellent Social Network with another tour de force, injecting the murder mystery that introduces us to outcast hacker Lisbeth Salander [...] and embattled journalist [...] with style, intensity and relentless suspense. Mara is a revelation, and the film's daunting 160-minute runtime breezes by thanks to one heart-racing scene after the next. Dark and tough to watch at times, but a triumph all around." The film came second in indieWire's list of "Drew Taylor's Favorite Films Of 2011", while reaching the top ten of seven other publications, including the St. Louis Post-Dispatch, San Francisco Chronicle, and the New Orleans Times-Picayune. The Girl with the Dragon Tattoo was declared one of the best films of the year by the American Film Institute, as well as the National Board of Review of Motion Pictures.

Date of ceremony	Award	Category	Recipients	Result
February 26, 2012	84th Academy Awards	Best Actress	Rooney Mara	Nominated
February 26, 2012	84th Academy Awards	Best Cinematography	Jeff Cronenweth	Nominated
February 26, 2012	84th Academy Awards	Best Film Editing	Angus Wall, Kirk Baxter	Won
February 26, 2012	84th Academy Awards	Best Sound Editing	Ren Klyce	Nominated
February 26, 2012	84th Academy Awards	Best Sound Mixing	David Parker, Michael Semanick, Ren Klyce and Bo Persson	Nominated
January 10, 2012	Alliance of Women Film Journalists Awards	Best Film Music or Score	Trent Reznor, Atticus Ross	Won
February 12, 2012	American Society of Cinematographers Awards	Best Cinematography	Jeff Cronenweth	Nominated
February 12, 2012	65th British Academy Film Awards	Best Cinematography	Jeff Cronenweth	Nominated
February 12, 2012	65th British Academy Film Awards	Best Original Music	Trent Reznor, Atticus Ross	Nominated
January 12, 2012	Broadcast Film Critics Association Awards	Best Editing	Kirk Baxter, Angus Wall	Won
January 12, 2012	Broadcast Film Critics Association Awards	Best Composer	Trent Reznor, Atticus Ross	Nominated
January 5, 2012	Central Ohio Film Critics Association Awards	Best Picture		Nominated
January 5, 2012	Central Ohio Film Critics Association Awards	Best Director	David Fincher	Nominated
January 5, 2012	Central Ohio Film Critics Association Awards	Best Adapted Screenplay	Steven Zaillian	Won
December 19, 2011	Chicago Film Critics Association Awards	Best Original Score	Trent Reznor, Atticus Ross	Nominated
January 10, 2012	Denver Film Critics Association Awards	Best Actress	Rooney Mara	Nominated
January 28, 2012	Directors Guild of America Awards	Best Director	David Fincher	Nominated
January 15, 2012	Golden Globe Awards	Best Actress – Motion Picture Drama	Rooney Mara	Nominated
January 15, 2012	Golden Globe Awards	Best Original Score	Trent Reznor, Atticus Ross	Nominated
February 10, 2013	Grammy Awards	Best Score Soundtrack for Visual Media	Trent Reznor, Atticus Ross	Won
June 7, 2012	Kerrang! Awards	Best Film		Nominated
June 3, 2012	MTV Movie Awards	Best Female Performance	Rooney Mara	Nominated
June 3, 2012	MTV Movie Awards	Breakthrough Performance	Rooney Mara	Nominated
June 3, 2012	MTV Movie Awards	Best On-Screen Transformation	Rooney Mara	Nominated
December 1, 2011	National Board of Review Awards	Top Ten Film		Nominated
December 1, 2011	National Board of Review Awards	Breakthrough Performance	Rooney Mara (Tied with Felicity Jones for Like Crazy)	Won
December 23, 2011	Oklahoma Film Critics Circle Awards	Best Picture		Nominated
January 21, 2012	Producers Guild of America Award	Best Picture	Ceán Chaffin and Scott Rudin	Nominated
July 26, 2012	Saturn Awards	Best Horror or Thriller Film		Won
December 19, 2011	St. Louis Gateway Film Critics Association Awards	Best Director	David Fincher	Nominated
December 19, 2011	St. Louis Gateway Film Critics Association Awards	Best Actress	Rooney Mara	Won
December 19, 2011	St. Louis Gateway Film Critics Association Awards	Best Cinematography	Jeff Cronenweth	Nominated
December 19, 2011	St. Louis Gateway Film Critics Association Awards	Best Music	Trent Reznor, Atticus Ross	Nominated
December 19, 2011	St. Louis Gateway Film Critics Association Awards	Best Scene	Blur Studio (for the opening credits)	Won
December 5, 2011	Washington D.C. Area Film Critics Association Awards	Best Score	Trent Reznor, Atticus Ross	Nominated
February 19, 2012	Writers Guild of America Awards	Best Adapted Screenplay	Steven Zaillian	Nominated

== Sequel ==
In December 2011, Fincher stated that the creative team involved planned to film the sequels The Girl Who Played with Fire and The Girl Who Kicked the Hornets' Nest, "back to back." There was an announced release date of 2013 for a film version of The Girl Who Played with Fire, although by August 2012 it was delayed due to changes being done to the script, being written by Steven Zaillian. By July 2013, Andrew Kevin Walker was hired to re-write the script. The following year, Fincher stated that a script for The Girl Who Played with Fire had been written and that it was "extremely different from the book," and that despite the long delay, he was confident that the film would be made given that the studio "already has spent millions of dollars on the rights and the script". Mara was less optimistic about the production of the sequels, despite expressing her interest in appearing in them.

By November 2015, it was announced that Sony was proceeding with an adaptation of The Girl in the Spider's Web, a 2015 novel by David Lagercrantz that was a continuation of the original Millennium trilogy after series creator Stieg Larsson died in 2004. Mara was not expected to reprise her role, though she later stated that she was still contractually signed on to do so. The following year, Fede Álvarez was announced by Sony as director, as well as co-screenwriter with Steven Knight and Jay Basu. The Girl in the Spider's Web was notably the first adaptation of an installment in the book series to be produced into an English-language film upon its initial release. By March 2017, Álvarez announced that the film would have an entirely new cast, as he wanted the entire film to be his interpretation of the story.

In September of the same year, Claire Foy was cast as Lisbeth Salander, replacing Mara. The film was released in the U.S. on November 9, 2018.
