= Internationalen =

Socialist newspaper in Sweden

Internationalen masthead, 1976

Internationalen (the Swedish language name of "The Internationale") is a Swedish Trotskyist weekly newspaper of the Socialist Party.

== History and profile ==
The newspaper was established in 1971 originally by the name Mullvaden ("the Mole") as a monthly magazine, but it changed its name to Internationalen in 1974 when it became a weekly magazine. The earlier name is derived from a Shakespeare quotation which Marx used in The Eighteenth Brumaire of Louis Bonaparte. In act 1, scene 5 of Hamlet, Hamlet himself cries out "Well said, old mole!"

Internationalen has approximately 2000 subscribers.

One of the paper's most famous journalists was Stieg Larsson who published articles there in the 1980s.
