= Socialist Politics =

Swedish Trotskyist organization

- Founded: 1971
- Ideology: Trotskyism; Marxism
- European affiliation: European Anti-Capitalist Left
- International affiliation: Fourth International

Website
- socialistiskpolitik.se

Socialist Politics (Swedish: Socialistisk Politik), formerly known as the Socialist Party (Swedish: Socialistiska Partiet), is a Swedish Trotskyist organization and former political party. It is the Swedish section of the Fourth International.

== History ==
The party was formed at a congress in 1971, through the merger of the Revolutionary Marxists (RM) and the Bolshevik Group (BG). Initially it was called League of Revolutionary Marxists (Swedish: Revolutionära Marxisters Förbund, RMF). One section of RM did not agree with the formation of RM and formed the Communist Working Groups (Swedish: Kommunistiska Arbetsgrupperna, KAG). KAG would later reconcile with RMF. It dissolved in 1972 and its former members joined either RMF or the Left Party – the Communists.

At the fifth party congress, held in 1975, the name was changed to Communist Workers League (Kommunistiska Arbetarförbundet). In 1982, the party adopted its existing name.

In the early 1990s, the party suffered a small split that went on to form the Swedish section of the Pathfinder tendency. In 1994, a smaller group left the SP to form a Swedish section of the League for the Fifth International, Workers' Power.

In 2019, the Socialist party was reorganized from a political party into an "eco-socialist organisation for activism and ideology production" named Socialist Politics that calls for its members to join the Left Party.

Socialistic Politics publishes the weekly paper Internationalen.

During the 2023 Brazilian Congress attack the organization expressed solidarity with President of Brazil Luiz Inácio Lula da Silva.
