= Eva Gabrielsson =

Swedish architect, author, political activist and feminist

- Born: 17 November 1953 (age 72); Sweden
- Occupations: Architect, author
- Partner: Stieg Larsson (from 1974–2004; his death)

Eva Gabrielsson (born 17 November 1953) is a Swedish architect, author, political activist, feminist, and the long-time partner of the late Swedish crime novelist Stieg Larsson.

== Life with Larsson ==
Gabrielsson and Stieg Larsson lived together from 1974 until his death in 2004. Larsson was one of the foremost experts in Sweden on anti-democratic, extreme right-wing, and neo-Nazi movements. Gabrielsson says she and Larsson never married because he had believed his anti-fascist work could have put her at risk if there was a paper trail linking them legally or financially. Because they were never married and Larsson died without leaving a will, his estate went to his father and brother, in accordance with Swedish law. Larsson was somewhat estranged from his father Erland and his brother Joakim (1957-2024) because nine years of his childhood were spent happily living with his grandparents in the northern country of Sweden. "It is as if my identity has been erased. It's like being dispossessed," Gabrielsson said to a reporter in 2010.

Since shortly after his death, Gabrielsson has been negotiating with Joakim and Erland Larsson over control of Larsson's work. At one point, Larsson's father and brother offered Gabrielsson roughly $3.3 million, but she continues to fight for the literary rights of Larsson's work.

Gabrielsson's memoir, "There Are Things I Want You to Know" About Stieg Larsson and Me, chronicles their life together and puts Larsson's often chaotic life into context. Gabrielsson, in one interview, explains that she did not start the memoir with the intention of writing a book; rather, it all stemmed from diary entries that Gabrielsson was writing in order to deal with the grief of losing her partner. The title of her book comes from a love letter that Larsson wrote to Gabrielsson when he thought he might die during a trip to Africa in 1977. The letter is included in the memoir along with the details of Larsson's trip to Africa.

Her partner, she says, was a feminist, a hopeless businessman, a journalist who could not hold down a staff job, and a passionate fighter and investigator for social causes and against the far-right. The memoir also details how the couple met and their struggles together at Expo, the anti-fascist publication Larsson founded in 1995. According to Gabrielsson, Larsson had written 200 pages of a fourth novel in his internationally successful Millennium series before he died; she has been seeking the legal authority to be in charge of what will happen to these 200 pages, as well as to exercise control over all Larsson's literary work, although so far Larsson's family has refused to give her such rights. If granted the literary rights of the series, however, Gabrielsson explains that she is not sure that it is fair for a ghostwriter to complete the work that Larsson had started.

== Writer, activist and architect ==
As a writer, in addition to working with Stieg Larsson on his literary projects, she is the co-author of several books, including a monograph on the subject of cohabitation in Sweden, a Swedish government study on how to create more sustainable housing, and a forthcoming study on the Swedish urban planner Per Olof Hallman. She has also translated Philip K. Dick's The Man in the High Castle into Swedish. As an activist, she works to end violence against women.

People who knew Stieg Larsson, such as his friend Kurdo Baksi and Anders Hellberg, a colleague of Larsson's in the 1970s and 1980s, were surprised that he wrote the Millennium novels. Hellberg went so far as to suspect that Larsson is not the sole author of the series, reasoning that Larsson was simply not a good enough writer. Gabrielsson has been named as the most likely candidate, due to her chosen wording during at least one interview that seemed to imply co-authorship, although she later claimed she had been misquoted. In 2011, Gabrielsson expressed anger at such accusations and clarified "The actual writing, the craftsmanship, was Stieg's. But the content is a different matter. There are a lot of my thoughts, ideas and work in there." As an example, she said he used her unfinished book about architect Per Olof Hallman to research locations for the Millennium series and that the two of them physically checked places together and discussed where the characters would live.

Her architectural practice is currently involved in housing and office construction and heading a European Union initiative to create sustainable architecture in the Dalarna region.
