= The Girl with the Dragon Tattoo =

2005 novel by Stieg Larsson

- Swedish first edition cover
- Author: Stieg Larsson
- Original title: Män som hatar kvinnor
- Translator: Reg Keeland, pseudonym of Steven T. Murray
- Language: Swedish
- Series: Millennium
- Genre: Crime, mystery, thriller
- Publisher: Norstedts Förlag (Swedish)
- Publication date: August 2005
- Publication place: Sweden
- English publication date: January 2008
- Media type: Print (paperback, hardback)
- Pages: 544 (paperback)
- ISBN: 978-91-1-301408-1 (Swedish); ISBN 978-1-84724-253-2 (English)
- OCLC: 186764078
- Followed by: The Girl Who Played with Fire

The Girl with the Dragon Tattoo (original title in Swedish: Män som hatar kvinnor, lit. 'Men Who Hate Women') is a psychological thriller novel by Swedish author Stieg Larsson. It was published posthumously in 2005, translated into English in 2008, and became an international bestseller.

The Girl with the Dragon Tattoo is the first book of the Millennium series. Originally a trilogy by Larsson, the series has since been expanded, as the publishers with the rights have contracted with other authors.

== Background ==
Larsson spoke of an incident which he said occurred when he was 15: he stood by as three men gang raped an acquaintance of his named Lisbeth. Days later, wracked with guilt for having done nothing to help her, he begged her forgiveness—which she refused to grant. The incident, he said, haunted him for years afterward and in part inspired him to create a character named Lisbeth who was also a rape victim. The veracity of this story has been questioned since Larsson's death, after a colleague from Expo magazine reported to Rolling Stone that Larsson had told him he had heard the story secondhand and retold it as his own. The murder of Catrine da Costa was also an inspiration when he wrote the book.

With the exception of the fictional Hedestad, the novel takes place in actual Swedish towns. The magazine Millennium in the books has characteristics similar to that of Larsson's magazine, Expo, such as its leftist socio-political leanings, its exposés on Swedish Nazism and financial corruption and its financial difficulties.

Both Larsson's longtime partner Eva Gabrielsson and English translator Steven T. Murray have said that Christopher MacLehose (who works for British publisher Quercus) "needlessly prettified" the English translation; as such, Murray requested he be credited under the pseudonym "Reg Keeland". The English release also changed the title, even though Larsson specifically refused to allow the Swedish publisher to do so, and the size of Salander's dragon tattoo; from a large piece covering her entire back, to a small shoulder tattoo.

== Plot ==
Middle-aged journalist Mikael Blomkvist, who publishes the magazine Millennium in Stockholm, has lost a libel case involving damaging allegations about billionaire Swedish industrialist Hans-Erik Wennerström, and is sentenced to three months in prison. Facing jail time and professional disgrace, Blomkvist steps down from his position on the magazine's board of directors, despite strong objections from Erika Berger, Blomkvist's longtime friend, occasional lover, and business partner. At the same time, he is offered an unlikely freelance assignment by Henrik Vanger, the elderly former CEO of Vanger Enterprises. Blomkvist accepts the assignment, unaware that Vanger commissioned gifted private investigator Lisbeth Salander to comprehensively investigate Blomkvist's personal and professional history.

Blomkvist visits Vanger at his estate on the tiny island of Hedeby, several hours from Stockholm. The old man convinces Blomkvist to do the assignment, by promising not only financial reward but also solid evidence that Wennerström is truly the scoundrel Blomkvist suspects him to be. On this basis, Blomkvist agrees to spend a year writing the Vanger family history as a cover for the real assignment: solving the "cold case" of the disappearance of Vanger's great niece Harriet some 40 years earlier. Vanger expresses his suspicion that Harriet was murdered by a member of the vast Vanger family, many of whom were present in Hedeby on the day of her disappearance. Each year on his birthday Harriet gave Henrik a present of pressed flowers. Since her murder, each year on his birthday, the murderer torments him with a present of pressed flowers, explains Vanger.

Blomkvist begins to analyze the volumes of information that Vanger has obsessively compiled over 40 years about the circumstances of Harriet's disappearance. Hedeby is home to several generations of Vangers, all part-owners in Vanger Enterprises. Under the pretext of researching the family history, and because the island is small, Blomkvist soon becomes acquainted with the members of the extended family who are variously mad, uninterested, concerned, hostile, or aloof.

Blomkvist immerses himself in the case. Eventually Lisbeth Salander is brought in, now to assist him with research by using her skills as a computer hacker. Ultimately the two discover that Harriet's brother Martin, now CEO of Vanger Industries, has been systematically abusing and killing women for years. Moreover, the behavior was indoctrinated in him by his late father Gottfried who sexually abused Martin and Harriet as well. Blomkvist tries to confront Martin, but is captured and taken to a torture chamber hidden in Martin's house. Martin reveals that he is not responsible for Harriet's disappearance. Moments before Martin can kill Blomkvist, Lisbeth bursts in and frees him. Martin escapes but commits suicide by crashing his car into a truck on the highway.

Blomkvist and Lisbeth realize that Harriet was not murdered, but ran away to escape from her sadistic brother. They track her in Australia where she runs a sheep farming company. Confronted, she confirms their account of the case, and reveals that she was responsible for the presumed accidental death of her father. She returns to Sweden where she is happily reunited with Vanger and begins to take a leading role in the newly leaderless family company.

The evidence about Wennerström, which Vanger promised, turns out to be weak, and the promises turn out to have been mostly a lure for Blomkvist. But Lisbeth breaks into Wennerström's computer and discovers that his crimes go beyond what Blomkvist had published. Using this evidence, Blomkvist publishes an article and a book which destroy Wennerström and raise Blomkvist and Millennium to national prominence.

== Characters ==
- Mikael Blomkvist – journalist, publisher and part-owner of the monthly political magazine, Millennium
- Lisbeth Salander – freelance surveillance agent and researcher specializing in investigating people on behalf of Milton Security
- Erika Berger – editor-in-chief/majority owner of Millennium and Blomkvist's long-standing lover
- Henrik Vanger – retired industrialist and former CEO of Vanger Corporation
- Harriet Vanger – Henrik's grandniece who disappeared without trace in 1966
- Martin Vanger – Harriet's brother and CEO of Vanger Corporation
- Gottfried Vanger – Henrik's nephew, and Martin and Harriet's deceased father
- Isabella Vanger – Gottfried Vanger's widow, and Martin and Harriet's mother
- Cecilia Vanger – daughter of Harald Vanger and one of Henrik's nieces
- Anita Vanger – daughter of Harald Vanger and one of Henrik's nieces, currently living in London
- Birger Vanger – Harald Vanger' son; one of Henrik's nephews
- Harald Vanger – Henrik's elder brother, a member of the Swedish Nazi Party
- Hans-Erik Wennerström – corrupt billionaire financier
- Robert Lindberg – a banker, Blomkvist's source for the libelous story on Wennerström
- William Borg – a former journalist and Blomkvist's nemesis
- Monica Abrahamsson – Blomkvist's ex-wife whom he married in 1986 and divorced in 1991
- Pernilla Abrahamsson – their daughter who was born in 1986
- Greger Beckman – Erika Berger's husband
- Holger Palmgren – Salander's legal guardian and lawyer who becomes disabled by a stroke
- Nils Bjurman – Salander's legal guardian and lawyer after Palmgren
- Dirch Frode – former lawyer for Vanger Corporation, now a lawyer with only one client: Henrik Vanger
- Dragan Armanskij – CEO and COO of Milton Security, Lisbeth's employer
- Plague – computer hacker/genius
- Eva – Martin Vanger's girlfriend
- Christer Malm – director, art designer and part-owner of Millennium
- Janne Dahlman – managing editor of Millennium
- Gustaf Morell – retired Detective Superintendent who investigated Harriet's disappearance
- Anna Nygren – Henrik Vanger's housekeeper
- Gunnar Nilsson – caretaker of Henrik Vanger's domain in Hedeby

== Major themes ==
Larsson refers to several classic forerunners in the same genre and comments on contemporary Swedish society. Reviewer Robert Dessaix writes, "His favourite targets are violence against women, the incompetence and cowardice of investigative journalists, the moral bankruptcy of big capital and the virulent strain of Nazism still festering ... in Swedish society." Cecilia Ovesdotter Alm and Anna Westerstahl Stenport write that the novel "reflects—implicitly and explicitly—gaps between rhetoric and practice in Swedish policy and public discourse about complex relations between welfare state retrenchment, neoliberal corporate and economic practices, and politicised gender construction. According to one article, the novel endorses a pragmatic acceptance of a neoliberal world order that is delocalized, dehumanized and misogynistic."

Alm and Stenport add, "What most international (and Swedish) reviewers overlook is that the financial and moral corruptibility at the heart of The Girl with the Dragon Tattoo is so profound as to indict most attributes associated with contemporary Sweden as democratic and gender-equal. American critic Maureen Corrigan called it an "unflinching ... commonsense feminist social commentary".

Larsson further enters the debate as to how responsible criminals are for their crimes, and how much is blamed on upbringing or society. For instance, Salander has a strong will and assumes that everyone else does, too. She is portrayed as having suffered every kind of abuse in her young life, including an unnecessary commital to a psychiatric clinic and subsequent instances of sexual assault suffered at the hands of her court-appointed guardian.

Maria de Lurdes Sampaio, in the journal Cross-Cultural Communication, asserts that, "Blomkvist, a modern Theseus, leads us to the labyrinth of the globalized world, while the series' protagonist, Lisbeth Salander, modeled on the Amazon, is an example of the empowerment of women in crime fiction by playing the role of the 'tough guy' detective, while also personifying the popular roles of the victim, the outcast and the avenger." In this context, she discusses "Dialogues with Greek tragedy... namely Salander's struggles with strong father figures." Sampaio also argues,

Then, like so many other writers and moviemakers, Larsson plays with people's universal fascination for religious mysteries, enigmas and hermeneutics, while highlighting the way the Bible and other religious books have inspired hideous serial criminals throughout history. There are many passages dedicated to the Hebrew Bible, to the Apocrypha and to the controversies surrounding different Church's branches. The transcription of Latin expressions (e.g., "sola fide" or "claritas scripturae") together with the biblical passages, which provide the clues to unveil the secular mysteries, proves that Larsson was well acquainted with Umberto Eco's bestsellers and with similar plots. There are many signs of both The Name of the Rose and of Foucault's Pendulum in the Millennium series, and in some sense these two works are contained in the first novel.

== Reception and awards ==
The novel was released to great acclaim in Sweden and later, on its publication in many other European countries. In the original language, it won Sweden's Glass Key Award in 2006 for best crime novel of the year. It also won the 2008 Boeke Prize, and in 2009 the Galaxy British Book Awards for Books Direct Crime Thriller of the Year, and the prestigious Anthony Award for Best First Novel. The Guardian ranked The Girl with the Dragon Tattoo at 98 in its list of 100 Best Books of the 21st Century. Larsson was awarded the ITV3 Crime Thriller Award for International Author of the Year in 2008.

It debuted at number four on The New York Times Best Seller list. Alex Berenson wrote in The New York Times, "The novel offers a thoroughly ugly view of human nature"; while it "opens with an intriguing mystery" and the "middle section of Girl is a treat, the rest of the novel doesn't quite measure up. The book's original Swedish title was Men Who Hate Women, a label that just about captures the subtlety of the novel's sexual politics." The Los Angeles Times said "the book takes off, in the fourth chapter: From there, it becomes classic parlor crime fiction with many modern twists....The writing is not beautiful, clipped at times (though that could be the translation by Reg Keeland) and with a few too many falsely dramatic endings to sections or chapters. But it is a compelling, well-woven tale that succeeds in transporting the reader to rural Sweden for a good crime story." Several months later, Matt Selman said the book "rings false with piles of easy super-victories and far-fetched one-in-a-million clue-findings." Richard Alleva, in the Catholic journal Commonweal, wrote that the novel is marred by "its inept backstory, banal characterizations, flavorless prose, surfeit of themes (Swedish Nazism, uncaring bureaucracy, corporate malfeasance, abuse of women, etc.), and—worst of all—author Larsson's penchant for always telling us exactly what we should be feeling."

On the other hand, Dr. Abdallah Daar, writing for Nature, said, "The events surrounding the great-niece's disappearance are meticulously and ingeniously pieced together, with plenty of scientific insight." The Pittsburgh Post-Gazette wrote, "It's a big, intricately plotted, darkly humorous work, rich with ironies, quirky but believable characters and a literary playfulness that only a master of the genre and its history could bring off."

The Girl with the Dragon Tattoo sold more than 30 million copies by 2010. In the United States, it sold more than 3.4 million copies in hardcover or ebook formats, and 15 million total by June 2011.

== Book of essays ==
Wiley published a collection of essays, edited by Eric Bronson, titled The Girl with the Dragon Tattoo and Philosophy (2011).

== Film adaptations ==
- The Swedish film production company Yellow Bird created film versions of the first three Millennium books, all three films released in 2009, beginning with The Girl with the Dragon Tattoo, directed by Danish filmmaker Niels Arden Oplev. The protagonists were played by Michael Nyqvist and Noomi Rapace.
- A Hollywood film adaptation of the book, directed by David Fincher, was released in December 2011. The main characters were portrayed by Daniel Craig and Rooney Mara.
- Millennium, a Swedish six-part television miniseries based on the film adaptations of Stieg Larsson's series of the same name, was broadcast on SVT1 from 20 March 2010 to 24 April 2010. The series was produced by Yellow Bird in cooperation with several production companies, including SVT, Nordisk Film, Film i Västm, and ZDF Enterprises.
- Dragon Tattoo Trilogy: Extended Edition is the title of the TV miniseries release on DVD, Blu-ray, and video on demand in the US. This version of the miniseries comprises nine hours of story content, including more than two hours of additional footage not seen in the theatrical versions of the original Swedish films. The four-disc set includes: The Girl with the Dragon Tattoo – Extended Edition, The Girl Who Played with Fire – Extended Edition, The Girl Who Kicked the Hornets' Nest – Extended Edition, and a bonus disc including two hours of special features.

== Parodies ==
- The Dragon with the Girl Tattoo (2010) – Adam Roberts
- The Girl Who Fixed the Umlaut (2010) – Nora Ephron
- The Girl with the Tramp Stamp Tattoo (2011) – Oz Rodriguez and Matt Villines
- The Girl with the Sturgeon Tattoo (2011) – Lars Arffssen
- The Girl with the Sandwich Tattoo: A Cruel Parody (2013) – Dragon Stiegsson
- "The Coach with the Dragon Tattoo", an episode of Class by Patrick Ness
- "The Girl with the Dungeons and Dragons Tattoo", an episode of Supernatural

== Publication details ==
- August 2005, Swedish: Norstedts (ISBN 978-91-1-301408-1), paperback (poss. 1st edition)
- 10 January 2008, UK: MacLehose Press/Quercus Imprint (ISBN 978-1-84724-253-2), hardback (translated as The Girl with the Dragon Tattoo by Reg Keeland)
- 16 September 2008, US: Alfred A. Knopf (ISBN 978-0-307-26975-1), hardback
