= Crime Writers of Canada Awards of Excellence =

Canadian literary awards

The Crime Writers of Canada Awards of Excellence, formerly known as the Arthur Ellis Awards, are a group of Canadian literary awards, presented annually by the Crime Writers of Canada for the best Canadian crime and mystery writing published in the previous year. The award is presented during May in the year following publication.

Originally, the awards were named for Arthur Ellis, the pseudonym of several of Canada's official hangmen, the first and most famous being Arthur B. English. The award statuette was designed by actor and theatre designer Peter Blais.

In 2021 the Crime Writers of Canada announced that they were retiring Arthur Ellis's name from the awards, renaming them to their current name.

== Best Novel ==
Best Novel Award winners
Year	Author	Title	Ref.
1984	Eric Wright	The Night the Gods Smiled	
1985	Howard Engel	Murder Sees the Light	
1986	Eric Wright	Death in the Old Country	
1987	Edward O. Phillips	Buried on Sunday	
1988	Carol Shields	Swann	
1989	Chris Scott	Jack	
1990	Laurence Gough	Hot Shots	
1991	L. R. Wright	A Chill Rain in January	
1992	Peter Robinson	Past Reason Hated	
1993	Carsten Stroud	Lizardskin	
1994	John Lawrence Reynolds	Gypsy Sins	
1995	Gail Bowen	A Colder Kind of Death	
1996	L. R. Wright	Mother Love	
1997	Peter Robinson	Innocent Graves	
1998	William Deverell	Trial of Passion	
1999	Nora Kelly	Old Wounds	
2000	Rosemary Aubert	The Feast of Stephen	
2001	Peter Robinson	Cold Is the Grave	
2002	Michelle Spring	In the Midnight Hour	
2003	Rick Mofina	Blood of Others	
2004	Giles Blunt	The Delicate Storm	
2005	Barbara Fradkin	Fifth Son	
2006	William Deverell	April Fool	
2007	Barbara Fradkin	Honour Among Men	
2008	Jon Redfern	Trumpets Sound No More	
2009	Linwood Barclay	Too Close to Home	
2010	Howard Shrier	High Chicago	
2011	Louise Penny	Bury Your Dead	
2012	Peter Robinson	Before the Poison	
2013	Giles Blunt	Until the Night	
2014	Seán Haldane	The Devil's Making	
2015	C. C. Humphreys	Plague: Murder Has a New Friend	
2016	Peter Kirby	Open Season	
2017	Donna Morrissey	The Fortunate Brother	
2018	Peter Robinson	Sleeping in the Ground	
2019	Anne Emery	Though the Heavens Fall	
2020	Michael Christie	Greenwood	
2021	Will Ferguson	The Finder	
2022	Dietrich Kalteis	Under an Outlaw Moon	
2023	Anthony Bidulka	Going to Beautiful	
2024	Loreth Anne White	The Maid's Diary	

== Best First Novel ==
Best First Novel Award winners
Year	Author	Title	Ref.
1987	Medora Sale	Murder on the Run	
1988	Laurence Gough	The Goldfish Bowl	
1989	John Brady	A Stone of the Heart	
1990	John Lawrence Reynolds	The Man Who Murdered God	
1991	Carsten Stroud	Sniper's Moon	
1992	Paul Grescoe	Flesh Wound	
1993	Sean Stewart	Passion Play	
1994	Gavin Scott	Memory Trace	
1995	Sparkle Hayter	What's A Girl Gotta Do?	
1996	John Spencer Hill	The Last Castrato	
1996	D.H. Toole	Moonlit Days and Nights	
1997	C. C. Benison	Death At Buckingham Palace	
1998	Kathy Reichs	Déja Dead	
1999	Liz Brady	Sudden Blow	
2000	Andrew Pyper	Lost Girls	
2001	Mark Zuehlke	Hands Like Clouds	
2002	Jon Redfern	The Boy Must Die	
2003	James W. Nichol	Midnight Cab	
2004	Jan Rehner	Just Murder	
2005	Jon Evans	Dark Places	
2006	Louise Penny	Still Life	
2007	Anne Emery	Sign of the Cross	
2008	Liam Durcan	Garcia's Heart	
2009	Howard Shrier	Buffalo Jump	
2010	Alan Bradley	The Sweetness at the Bottom of the Pie	
2011	Avner Mandelman	The Debba	
2012	Ian Hamilton	Water Rat of Wanchai	
2013	Simone St. James	The Haunting of Maddy Clare	
2014	J. Kent Messum	Bait	
2015	Steve Burrows	A Siege of Bitterns	
2016	Ausma Zehanat Khan	Unquiet Dead	
2017	Elle Wild	Strange Things Done	
2018	Dave Butler	Full Curl	
2019	A.J. Devlin	Cobra Clutch	
2020	Philip Elliott	Nobody Move	
2021	Guglielmo D'Izzia	The Transaction	
2022	Ashley Audrain	The Push	
2023	Sam Shelstad	Citizens of Light	
2024	Amanda Peters	The Berry Pickers	

== Best Novella ==
Best Novella Award winners
Year	Author	Title	Ref.
2013	Lou Allin	Contingency Plan	
2014	Melodie Campbell	The Goddaughter's Revenge	
2015	Jas R. Petrin	A Knock on the Door	
2016	Jeremy Bates	Black Canyon	
2017	Rick Blechta	Rundown	
2018	Mike Culpepper	How Lon Pruitt Was Found Murdered in an Open Field with No Footprints Around	
2019	John Lawrence Reynolds	Murder Among the Pines	
2020	Wayne Arthurson	The Red Chesterfield	
2021	Sam Wiebe	Never Going Back	
2022	Wayne Ng	Letters from Johnny	

== Best Crime Book in French ==
Best Crime Book in French Award winners
Year	Author	Title	Ref.
2000	Lionel Noël	Louna	
2001	Norbert Spehner	Le roman policier en Amérique française	
2002	Anne-Michèle Lévesque	Fleur invitait au troisième	
2003	Jacques Côté	Le rouge ideal	
2004	Jean Lemieux	On finit toujours par payer	
2005	Ann Lamontagne	Les douze pierres	
2006	Gérard Galarneau	Motel Riviera	
2007	No award presented		
2008	Mario Bolduc	Tsiganes	
2009	Jacques Côté	Le Chemin des brumes	
2010	Jean Lemieux	Le mort du chemin des Arsene	
2011	Jacques Côté	Dans le quartier des agités	
2012	Martin Michaud	La chorale du diable	
2013	Mario Bolduc	La Nuit des albinos: Sur les traces de Max O'Brien	
2014	Maureen Martineau	L’enfant promis	
2015	Andrée A. Michaud	Bondrée	
2016	Luc Chartrand	L'Affaire Myosotis	
2017	Marie-Ève Bourassa	Red Light: Adieu, Mignonne	
2018	Marie Saur	Les Tricoteuses	
2019	Hervé Gagnon	Adolphus – Une enquête de Joseph Laflamme	
2020	Andrée A. Michaud	Tempêtes	
2021	Roxanne Bouchard	La mariée de corail	
2022	Patrick Senécal	Flots	

== Best Juvenile or Young Adult Crime Book ==
Best Juvenile or Young Adult Crime Book Award winners
Year	Author	Title	Ref.
1994	John Dowd	Abalone Summer	
1995	James Heneghan	Torn Away	
1996	Norah McClintock	Mistaken Identity	
1997	Linda Bailey	How Can a Frozen Detective Stay Hot on the Trail?	
1998	Norah McClintock	The Body in the Basement	
1999	Norah McClintock	Sins of the Father	
2000	Linda Bailey	How Can a Brilliant Detective Shine in the Dark?	
2001	Tim Wynne-Jones	The Boy in the Burning House	
2002	Norah McClintock	Scared to Death	
2003	Norah McClintock	Break and Enter	
2004	Graham McNamee	Acceleration	
2005	Carrie Mac	The Beckoners	
2006	Vicki Grant	Quid Pro Quo	
2007	Sean Cullen	Hamish X and the Cheese Pirates	
2008	Shane Peacock	Eye of the Crow	
2009	Sharon E. McKay	War Brothers	
2010	Barbara Haworth-Attard	Haunted	
2011	Alice Kuipers	The Worst Thing She Ever Did	
2012	Tim Wynne-Jones	Blink & Caution	
2013	Shane Peacock	Becoming Holmes	
2014	Elizabeth MacLeod	Bones Never Lie	
2015	Sigmund Brouwer	Dead Man's Switch	
2016	Stephanie Tromly	Trouble Is a Friend of Mine	
2017	Gordon Korman	Masterminds	
2018	Linwood Barclay	Chase: Get Ready to Run	
2019	Linwood Barclay	Escape	
2020	Tom Ryan	Keep This to Yourself	
2021	Frances Greenslade	Red Fox Road	
2022	Kevin Sands	The Traitor's Blade	
2023	Jo Treggiari	Heartbreak Homes	
2024	Cherie Dimaline	Funeral Songs for Dying Girls	

== Best Crime Nonfiction ==
Best Crime Nonfiction Award winners
Year	Author	Title	Ref.
1985	Martin Friedland	The Trials of Israel Lipsky	
1986	Maggie Siggins	A Canadian Tragedy	
1987	Elliott Leyton	Hunting Humans	
1988	Gary Ross	Stung	
1989	Mick Lowe	Conspiracy of Brothers	
1990	Lisa Priest	Conspiracy of Silence	
1991	Susan Mayse	Ginger: The Life and Death of Albert Goodwin	
1992	William Lowther	Arms and the Man	
1993	Kirk Makin	Redrum the Innocent	
1994	David R. Williams	With Malice Aforethought	
1995	Michael Harris	The Prodigal Husband	
1996	Lois Simmie	The Secret Lives of Sgt. John Wilson	
1997	Jean Monet	The Cassock and the Crown	
1998	Patricia Pearson	When She Was Bad	
1999	Derek Finkle	No Claim to Mercy	
2000	Gordon Sinclair, Jr.	Cowboys and Indians	
2001	A.B. McKillop	The Spinster and the Prophet	
2002	Stevie Cameron and Harvey Cashore	The Last Amigo	
2002	Andrew Nikiforuk	Saboteurs	
2003	Andrew Mitrovica	Covert Entry	
2004	Julian Sher and William Marsden	The Road to Hell	
2005	Matthew Hart	The Irish Game	
2006	Rebecca Godfrey	Under the Bridge	
2007	Brian O'Dea	High	
2008	Julian Sher	One Child at a Time	
2009	Michael Calce and Craig Silverman	Mafiaboy	
2010	Terry Gould	Murder Without Borders	
2011	Stevie Cameron	On the Farm	
2012	Joshua Knelman	Hot Art	
2013	Steve Lillebuen	The Devil's Cinema	
2014	No award presented		
2015	Charlotte Gray	The Massey Murder	
2016	Dean Jobb	Empire of Deception: The Incredible Story of a Master Swindler Who Seduced a City and Captivated the Nation	
2017	Jeremy Grimaldi	A Daughter's Deadly Deception: The Jennifer Pan Story	
2018	Trevor Cole	The Whisky King: remarkable true story of Canada's most infamous bootlegger and the undercover Mountie on his trail	
2019	Sarah Weinman	The Real Lolita: Kidnapping of Sally Horner and the Novel that Scandalized the World	
2020	Charlotte Gray	Murdered Midas: A Millionaire, His Gold Mine, and a Strange Death on an Island Paradise	
2021	Justin Ling	Missing from the Village	
2022	Nate Hendley	The Beatle Bandit	

== Best Crime Short Story ==
Best Crime Short Story Award winners
Year	Author	Story	Publication	Ref.
1988	Eric Wright	Looking for an Honest Man	Cold Blood: Murder in Canada	
1989	Jas. R. Petrin	Killer in the House	Alfred Hitchcock's Mystery Magazine, December 1988	
1990	Josef Skvorecky	Humbug	The End of Lieutenant Boruvka	
1991	Peter Robinson	Innocence	Cold Blood III	
1992	Eric Wright	Two in the Bush	Christmas Stalkings	
1993	Nancy Kilpatrick	Mantrap	Murder, Mayhem, and the Macabre	
1994	Robert J. Sawyer	Just Like Old Times	On Spec, Summer 1993	
1995	Rosemary Aubert	The Midnight Boat to Palermo	Cold Blood IV	
1996	Mary Jane Maffini	Cotton Armour	Ladies Killing Circle	
1997	Richard K. Bercuson	Dead Run	Story Teller, Winter 1996–97	
1998	Sue Pike	Widow's Weeds	Cottage Country Killers	
1999	Scott Mackay	Last Inning	Ellery Queen's Mystery Magazine, February 1998	
2000	Matt Hughes	One More Kill	Blue Murder Magazine, December 1999	
2001	Peter Robinson	Murder in Utopia	Crime Through Time III	
2002	Mary Jane Maffini	Sign of the Times	Fit to Die	
2003	James Powell	Bottom Walker	Ellery Queen's Mystery Magazine, May 2002	
2004	Gregory Ward	Dead Wood	Hard Boiled Love	
2005	Leslie Watts	Crocodile Tears	Revenge: A Noir Anthology	
2006	Rick Mofina	Lightning Rider	Murder in Vegas	
2007	Dennis Richard Murphy	Fuzzy Wuzzy	Ellery Queen's Mystery Magazine, August 2006	
2008	Leslie Watts	Turners	Kingston Whig-Standard, July 7, 2007	
2009	Pasha Malla	Filmsong	Toronto Noir	
2010	Dennis Richard Murphy	Prisoner in Paradise	Ellery Queen's Mystery Magazine	
2011	Mary Jane Maffini	So Much in Common	Ellery Queen's Mystery Magazine	
2012	Catherine Astolfo	What Kelly Did		
2013	Yasuko Thanh	Spring-blade Knife	Floating Like The Dead	
2014	Twist Phelan	Footprints in Water		
2015	Margaret Atwood	Stone Mattress		
2016	Jeremy Bates	Black Canyon		
2017	Susan Daly	A Death at the Parsonage		
2018	Catherine Astolfo	The Outlier		
2019	Linda L. Richards	Terminal City		
2020	Peter Sellers	Closing Doors		
2021	Marcelle Dubé	Cold Wave, Sisters in Crime		
2022	Elizabeth Elwood	Number 10 Marlborough Place		

== Best Unpublished First Novel – "Unhanged Arthur" ==
First awarded in 2007 as part of the CWC mandate to recognize and promote the careers of promising new crime writers.

Best Unpublished First Novel Award winners
Year	Author	Title	Ref.
2007	Phyllis Smallman	Margarita Nights	
2008	D.J. McIntosh	The Witch of Babylon	
2009	Douglas A. Moles	Louder	
2010	Gloria Ferris	The Corpse Flower	
2011	John Jeneroux	Better Off Dead	
2012	Sam Wiebe	Last of the Independents	
2013	Coleen Steele	Sins Revisited	
2014	Rachel Greenaway	Cold Girl	
2015	Elle Wilde	Strange Things Done	
2016	Jayne Barnard	When the Flood Falls	
2017	S. J. Jennings	The Golkonda Project	
2018	Dianne Scott	Destruction in Paradise	
2019	Liv McFarlane	The Scarlet Cross	
2020	Liz Rachel Walker	The Dieppe Letters	
2021	Raymond Bazowski	The Future	
2022	Renee Lehnen	Elmington	

== Howard Engel Award ==
Howard Engel Award winners
Year	Author	Title	Ref.
2007	Katrina Onstad	Stay Where I Can See You	
2008	C. S. Porter	Beneath Her Skin	

== Derrick Murdoch Award ==
This is a special achievement award for contributions to the genre of crime and mystery writing, awarded at the discretion of the president of the Crime Writers of Canada. When first presented in 1984, it was known as the Chairman's Award; it was later renamed in honour of its first recipient, Derrick Murdoch. Since 2013, it has only been presented in years when the new biennial Grand Master Award, listed below, is not presented.

- 1984 – Derrick Murdoch
- 1985 – Tony Aspler
- 1986 – Margaret Millar
- 1987 – The CBC Drama Department
- 1988 – J.D. Singh and Jim Reicker
- 1989 – not presented
- 1990 – Eric Wilson
- 1991 – not presented
- 1992 – William Bankier, James Powell and Peter Sellers
- 1993 – not presented
- 1994 – not presented
- 1995 – Jim and Margaret McBride
- 1996 – not presented
- 1997 – not presented
- 1998 – Howard Engel and Eric Wright
- 1999 – Ted Wood
- 2000 – Eddie Barber, Rick Blechta, John North and David Skene-Melvin
- 2001 – L. R. Wright
- 2002 – James Dubro and Caro Soles
- 2003 – Margaret Cannon
- 2004 – Cheryl Freedman
- 2005 – Max Haines
- 2006 – Mary Jane Maffini
- 2007 – not presented
- 2008 – Edward D. Hoch
- 2009 – Gail Bowen
- 2010 – Peter Robinson
- 2011 – Louise Allin and N.A.T. Grant
- 2012 – Don Graves and Catherine Astolfo
- 2013 – Lyn Hamilton
- 2014 – not presented
- 2015 – Sylvia McConnell
- 2016 – not presented
- 2017 – Christina Jennings
- 2018 – not presented
- 2019 – Vicki Delany

== Grand Master Award ==
The Grand Master Award is presented every two years as a lifetime achievement award, to a crime writer with a distinguished and successful national and international career.

- 2014 – Howard Engel
- 2016 – Eric Wright
- 2018 – Gail Bowen
- 2020 – Peter Robinson
- 2022 – Louise Penny

== Best Genre Criticism/Reference ==
The award for Best Genre Criticism or Reference has only been presented twice.

- 1991 – Donald A. Redmond, Sherlock Holmes Among the Pirates
- 1992 – Wesley A. Wark, Spy Fiction, Spy Films and Real Intelligence

== Best Play ==
The award for Best Play has only been presented once.

- 1994 – Timothy Findley, The Stillborn Lover
