= The Red Chesterfield =

Crime novella by Wayne Arthurson

- First edition
- Author: Wayne Arthurson
- Genre: mystery
- Publisher: University of Calgary Press
- Publication date: 2019
- Publication place: Canada
- ISBN: 9781773850771

The Red Chesterfield is the eighth novel from Canadian writer Wayne Arthurson.

On May 22, 2020, the Crime Writers of Canada recognized The Red Chesterfield with the Arthur Ellis Award for the best crime novella of 2019. The award comes with a $200 cash prize.

During an interview with Shelagh Rogers Arthurson told her he used the novel to play with the tropes of the mystery genre.

"That genre trope around how [protagonists] always focus on the crime, regardless of what it does to their family — I wanted to mess with that. The mystery 'MacGuffin,' like the red chesterfield, usually would disappear after a while. I wanted it to appear again and again, to add a bit of magic realism to it. I wanted to play with that trope as well. I just tried different things."
