= Ashley Audrain =

Canadian writer

- Born: 1982 (age 43–44); Newmarket, Ontario, Canada
- Occupation: writer

Ashley Audrain (born 1982) is a Canadian writer. She is known for two novels, The Push (2021) and The Whispers (2023), which were each published as part of a high-profile contract.

== Career ==
Prior to turning her hand to writing, Audrain was publicity director for Penguin Canada, which is now an imprint of the Canadian division of Penguin Random House. In 2015 a health crisis with her youngest child caused her to retire. She found writing was an occupation she could undertake at home.

The Bookseller reported that her UK book deal with Michael Joseph Limited, an imprint of the UK division of Penguin Random House, was worth approximately £1,000,000, while her US book deal was in "the high seven figures". The first book of the two-book deal, The Push, was released for sale in US and Canada on January 5, 2021.

During a July 2019 interview with the Toronto Star Audrain had described The Push as a "psychological drama told through the lens of motherhood." The story is about a woman who is unsure whether or not there is something wrong with her daughter, Violet. This causes strain in her marriage to a man named Fox Connor. Kirkus Reviews called it "finely wrought psychological study of motherhood and inherited trauma", and concluded that it is "written for and about mothers but not for the faint of heart; it offers no easy answers." Publishers Weekly gave it a starred review for the "twisty, harrowing ride to the dark side of motherhood Audrain pilots so skillfully... a sterling addition to the burgeoning canon of bad seed suspense." The book was also reviewed in The Guardian and The New York Times Book Review. It was nominated for the Goodreads Choice Award for Debut and Mystery & Thriller. It was selected as a Richard & Judy Book Club in Spring 2022 and won the Arthur Ellis Award for First Novel, presented annually by the Crime Writers of Canada.

Audrain's second book, The Whispers, was published June 6, 2023.

== Works ==
- The Push (2021)ISBN 978-1984881687
- The Whispers (2023)ISBN 9781984881717
