= Anne Emery =

Canadian author of mystery novels

- Born: 1958 (age 67–68); Halifax, Nova Scotia, Canada
- Occupation: Author
- Writing career
- Genre: Crime fiction
- Notable awards: Arthur Ellis Award for Best Crime Novel; Independent Publisher Book Awards silver medal; Arthur Ellis Award for Best First Novel

Anne Emery is a Canadian writer of murder mystery novels and a lawyer. Emery has been awarded the 2019 Arthur Ellis Award for Best Novel, silver medal in the 2011 Independent Publisher Book Awards, and the 2007 Arthur Ellis Award for Best First Novel. In 2023, Emery's novel Fenian Street was shortlisted for the Crime Writers of Canada Whodunit Award for Best Traditional Mystery. She has published twelve novels in her Collins-Burke mystery series, which features Monty Collins, a Hallifax lawyer, and Father Brennan Burke, a Catholic priest and choirmaster, and a stand-alone novel.

== Personal life ==
Emery was raised in Moncton, New Brunswick in an Irish Catholic family. She graduated from St. Francis Xavier University and Dalhousie Law School. During the lockdowns of the COVID-19 pandemic, Emery walked every street on the Halifax peninsula, crossing off the final street in September 2020.

== Bibliography ==
=== Novels ===
- The Keening: A Mystery of Gaelic Ireland (2021)

Collins-Burke Mystery series

1. Sign of the Cross (2006), 2007 Arthur Ellis Award for Best First Novel
2. Obit (2007)
3. Barrington Street Blues (2008)
4. Cecilian Vespers (2009)
5. Children in the Morning (2010), silver medal winner in the 2011 Independent Publisher Book Awards; the title was inspired by Leonard Cohen's song "Suzanne"
6. Death at Christy Burke's (2011)
7. Blood on a Saint (2013), on short list for 2014 Atlantic Book Awards
8. Ruined Abbey (2015)
9. Lament for Bonnie (2016)
10. Though the Heavens Fall (2018), 2019 Arthur Ellis Award for Best Crime Novel
11. Postmark Berlin (2020)
12. Fenian Street (2022)
13. Counted Among the Dead (2024)
14. Declan (2025)
