= What Jennifer Did =

2024 Netflix true crime documentary film

- Directed by: Jenny Popplewell
- Written by: Tara Elwood
- Based on: Murder of Bich Pan
- Produced by: Tara Elwood
- Cinematography: Christopher Titus King; Steve Organ
- Edited by: Bjørn Johnson
- Music by: Nainita Desai
- Distributed by: Netflix
- Release date: April 10, 2024
- Running time: 87 minutes
- Country: Canada
- Language: English

What Jennifer Did is a 2024 Canadian true crime documentary film written and directed by Jenny Popplewell and released on Netflix on April 10, 2024. The documentary examines the case of Jennifer Pan, a Canadian woman convicted of orchestrating a murder-for-hire plot against her parents in Markham, Ontario, in 2010.

== Background ==
On November 8, 2010, Jennifer Pan called 911 to report that three gunmen had entered her family's home in Markham, Ontario, shooting her parents. Her mother, Bich Ha Pan, died from her injuries; her father, Huei Hann Pan, was left in a coma. Both parents had immigrated from Vietnam and worked at a car parts company. Investigators quickly grew skeptical of Pan's account. Phone records and a partial confession eventually led police to connect Pan to the hired assailants.

In 2014, Pan was found guilty, at the age of 28, of first-degree murder of her mother and the attempted murder of her father. In January 2015, she was sentenced to life in prison with no possibility of parole for 25 years. There were three co-conspirators: Lenford Crawford, David Mylvaganam, and her then-boyfriend Daniel Wong, were also convicted on both charges. In May 2023, the Ontario Court of Appeal overturned the four first-degree murder convictions on the basis that the trial judge had not provided the jury the option of returning verdicts of second-degree murder or manslaughter.

== Film ==
The documentary is written and directed by Jenny Popplewell, whose prior work includes American Murder: The Family Next Door. Executive producer Jeremy Grimaldi, a crime reporter who covered the Pan trial and wrote the 2016 book A Daughter's Deadly Deception: The Jennifer Pan Story, also contributed to the film. The documentary draws on police interrogation footage of Pan, news coverage, and interviews with investigators and individuals who knew the Pan family.

== Reception ==
What Jennifer Did became the most popular film on Netflix Canada following its release. Writing for the Alliance of Women Film Journalists, Valerie Kalfrin described the film as "a serviceable why'd-she-do-it, not a gripping whodunit," noting that its mystery is straightforward. The documentary holds a 49% approval rating on Rotten Tomatoes.

=== AI-generated image controversy ===
Shortly after the documentary's release, viewers flagged images appearing around the 28-minute mark of the film as appearing to have been artificially generated or digitally manipulated. The images, which depicted Pan smiling and flashing peace signs, displayed anomalies including distorted fingers, irregular facial features, and garbled background objects commonly associated with AI-generated images.

In response, executive producer Jeremy Grimaldi denied that artificial intelligence was used to create the images. Netflix and director Jenny Popplewell did not publicly comment on the controversy.

== See also ==
- Murder of Bich Pan
- American Murder: The Family Next Door
- A Daughter's Deadly Deception: The Jennifer Pan Story
