= Jon Evans =

Canadian novelist, journalist, adventure traveler, and software engineer

- Born: April 11, 1973 (age 53); Kitchener-Waterloo, Ontario, Canada
- Occupations: Novelist, Journalist
- Writing career
- Genres: Thriller, fantasy

Jon Evans (born April 11, 1973) is a Canadian novelist, journalist, adventure traveler, and software engineer.

== Early life ==
Born to an expatriate Rhodesian father and Canadian mother, Evans grew up in Waterloo, Ontario, and graduated from the University of Waterloo. He holds a degree in electrical engineering and possesses over 10 years of experience working as a software engineer. Evans currently resides in Berkeley, California, with his wife, who is an attorney.

== Career ==
Evans received the prestigious 2005 Arthur Ellis Award for Best First Novel from the Crime Writers of Canada for his book Dark Places. His works have garnered attention and reviews from esteemed publications such as The Economist and The Washington Post. The Executor, his graphic novel, was recognized as one of the top ten graphic novels of 2010 by Comic Book Resources, while his novel Beasts of New York was awarded a 2011 ForeWord Book of the Year medal.

In addition to his fiction writing, Evans has contributed to various magazines, including New Scientist, The Times of India, The Walrus, and Wired. He has also penned articles for esteemed newspapers such as The Globe and Mail and The Guardian, and currently writes a weekly column for TechCrunch. Currently residing in San Francisco, California, Evans frequently embarks on global travels to conduct research for his novels, immersing himself in diverse locations.

== Bibliography ==
Much of Evans' work is released under a Creative Commons license and can be downloaded for free.

=== Novels ===
- Dark Places (UK title: Trail of the Dead). 2004.
- Blood Price. 2005.
- Invisible Armies. 2006.
- The Night of Knives. 2007.
- Beasts of New York. 2011.
- Swarm. 2012.
- Exadelic, 2023.

=== Graphic novels ===
- The Executor (illustrated by Andrea Mutti). Vertigo Comics. 2010.
- "The Coder". Engineering.com. 2010.

=== Travel writing ===
- No Fixed Address. 2015.

=== Journalism ===
- "Blood, Bullets, Bombs and Bandwidth". Slashdot. July 24, 2003.
- "Wiring the War Zone". Wired. Vol. 13, no. 9. September 2005.
- "In the Shadow of Doom". The Walrus. 2006.
- "Free Delivery: Birth in Haiti". The Walrus. 2008.
- "Better Dying Through Chemistry". The Walrus. October 23, 2008.
- "Can A Video Game Make You Cry?". Maisonneuve. January 2009.
- "Burning With Desire". The Walrus. September 13, 2010.
- "This Is Where The Magic Happens". TechCrunch. June 7, 2011.
- "Save Helpless Faraway Africans From The Comfort Of Your Armchair!". TechCrunch. March 10, 2013.
- "Such DFW. Very Orwell. So Doge. Wow". TechCrunch. January 11, 2014.

== See also ==
- List of University of Waterloo people
