= Mary Jane Maffini =

Canadian mystery writer

Mary Jane Maffini is a Canadian mystery writer. She has crafted three mystery series and written 12 novels.

The Ladies Killing Circle and RendezVous Crime anthologies feature some of her stories, and Chatelaine, Storyteller, and Ellery Queen's Mystery Magazine have published her short stories. She has won two Arthur Ellis Awards for her short stories.

== Biography ==
Mary Jane Maffini was born in Sydney, Nova Scotia, and holds a BA (Hons) and a Masters in Library Sciences (MLS) from Dalhousie University.

She is a member as well as a former President of Crime Writers of Canada and a former board of directors member of the Canadian Booksellers Association. She is a member of Capital Crime Writers and the Ladies Killing Circle.

Maffini is a frequent panellist at mystery conferences such as Bouchercon and Malice Domestic in the United States and Bloody Words National Mystery Conference in Canada. She lives in Ottawa, Ontario.

== Awards ==
=== Won ===
- But the Corpse Can't Laugh Ellery Queen Mystery Magazine Readers' Choice List
- Winner of the Ottawa Citizen short story contest for Death Before Doughnuts 1994
- Arthur Ellis Award Best Short Story for Sign of the Times in the anthology Fit to Die 2001
- Arthur Ellis Award Best Short Story for Cotton Armour in the anthology The Ladies Killing Circle, 1995

=== Nominations ===
- Speak Ill of the Dead Shortlisted for the Arthur Ellis Award for Best First novel
- Kicking the Habit in Menopause Is Murder Shortlisted for the Arthur Ellis Award for Best Short Story, 1999
- Lament for a Lounge Lizard, nominated for the Arthur Ellis Award for Best Novel, 1999
- The Dead Don't Get Out Much was nominated for a Barry Award, 2006

== Publications ==
=== The Charlotte Adams Series ===
- Closet Confidential May 2010
- Death Loves a Messy Desk May 2009
- The Cluttered Corpse April 2008
- Organize Your Corpses Berkley Prime Crime, May 2007

=== The Camilla MacPhee series ===
- Law and Disorder Fall 2009
- The Dead Don't Get Out Much 2005
- The Devil's in the Details 2004
- Little Boy Blues 2002
- The Icing on the Corpse 2001
- Speak Ill of the Dead 1999

=== The Fiona Silk Series ===
- Too Hot to Handle Fall 2007
- Lament for a Lounge Lizard 2003

=== Short fiction/RendezVous Crime anthologies ===
- The Ladies Killing Circle
- Cottage Country Killers
- Menopause Is Murder
- Cold Blood V
- The Best of Cold Blood
- Over the Edge
- RendezVous Crime anthologies, Fit to Die 2001, Bone Dance 2003 and When Boomers Go Bad 2005.]
