= Wayne Arthurson =

Canadian writer

Wayne Arthurson is a Canadian writer and literary agent born in the province of Quebec and living in Edmonton, Alberta. He is the author of several novels and several books related to First Nations peoples, His parents are of Cree and French Canadian descent. He grew up on an army base.

== Career ==
Since the age of twenty-four, he has lived from his writing, whether as a journalist, freelance writer or novelist. He has published over two hundred articles in magazines and newspapers. He developed his skills during his time working as a security guard, as told to CBC Radio, He echos the pitfalls of what is labelled as Native American mystery novels: thrillers written by non-Indigenous perpetrating stereotypes such as the stoic warrior, the corrupted Chief, or the wise elder, thus creating a false sense of authenticity.

Arthurson's first novel, Final Season, published in 2002, is set in a First Nations community that faces profound environmental change, due to a new hydroelectric project.

Arthurson has two mystery series. One with the recurring hero Leo Desroches, a metis journalist, who has had his own run-ins with the law: Fall from Grace published in 2011, A Killing Winter published in 2012, and Blood Red Summer published in 2016. They were followed by the second series featuring Sergeant Neumann: The Traitors of Camp 133 in 2016 and Dishonour in Camp 133 in 2019, set in a POW camp for captured Germans, in Alberta. The Red Chesterfield, published in 2019, features "M", a by-law enforcement officer, threading not so carefully amidst family members "J" and "K".

He is translated in French by Alire and Héliotrope.

In October 2021, he joined The Rights Factory as a literary agent.

== Awards and honors ==
Arthurson won the Alberta Readers' Choice Award in 2012 with his first novel Fall From Grace. He won the Crime Writers of Canada Awards of Excellence in May 2020 (formerly the Arthur Ellis Award) for best crime novella with The Red Chesterfield. He was also shortlisted twice for the High Plains Book Awards in the Best Indigenous Writer category.

== Bibliography ==
- Wayne Arthurson (2019). The Red Chesterfield. University of Calgary Press. ISBN 9781773850771.
- Wayne Arthurson (2019). Dishonour in Camp 133. Turnstone Press. ISBN 9780888016218.
- Wayne Arthurson (2016). Traitors of Camp 133. Ravenstone. ISBN 978-0-88801-587-7
- Wayne Arthurson (2016). Blood Red Summer. Eschia Books. ISBN 9781926696270.
- Wayne Arthurson (2015). Fall from Grace. self-published. ISBN 9781515143406.
- Wayne Arthurson (2012). Alberta's Weekly Newspapers. Folklore Pub. ISBN 9781926677804.
- Wayne Arthurson (2012). A Killing Winter. Macmillan. ISBN 9781429924603.
- Wayne Arthurson (2012). Spirit Animals. Eschia Books. ISBN 9781926696218.
- Wayne Arthurson (2010). In the Shadow of Our Ancestors: The Inventions and Genius of the First Peoples. Eschia Books. ISBN 9781926696133.
- Wayne Arthurson (2002). Final Season. Thistledown Press. ISBN 9781894345484.
