= CrimeFictionCanada =

- Founded: 2000
- Founder: Dr. Marilyn Rose and Dr. Jeannette Sloniowski
- Headquarters: St. Catharines, Ontario, Canada
- Website: www.brocku.ca/crimefictioncanada

CrimeFictionCanada is an online database founded in 2000 by Dr. Marilyn Rose and Dr. Jeanette Sloniowski of Brock University, St. Catharines, Ontario, Canada. They are co-editors of Canada's first critical book on Canadian detective fiction, Detecting Canada, which is currently in press at Wilfrid Laurier University Press. Sloniowski was also a Judge for the Crime Writers of Canada Best Crime Novel in 2007 and 2008. Dr. Philippa Gates of Wilfrid Laurier University, a detective fiction researcher who was nominated for an Edgar Award by the Mystery Writers of America in the Best Critical/Bibliographical Work for her text, "Detecting Women: Gender and the Hollywood Detective Film," joined the project in May 2005.

The database is broader than its name might suggest. Along with three specifically Canadian sources the data base includes seven lists that cover works of crime, mystery and detection written or produced in English from around the world.

The data base has several sections. There are records of primary sources: Canadian detective fiction - novels; Canadian detective fiction - short stories; crime, mystery and detection television; crime, mystery and detection films, and The Skene-Melvin Collection. The Skene-Melvin Collection of Canadian Crime, Mystery and Detective Fiction at Brock University, was donated to the university by detective fiction bibliographer David Skene-Melvin in 2001. Gates, in association with the Social Sciences and Humanities Research Council of Canada (SSHRC), has also provided funding and research support for the data base.

The lists of secondary sources cover criticism of Canadian crime, mystery and detective fiction; general criticism of crime, mystery and detection; general criticism of crime, mystery and detection television; general criticism of crime, mystery and detection film; theses and dissertations on crime, mystery and detection.

The lists are fully searchable, by author, titles, publishers, and keywords. The keywords include subgenres such as the "cozy", the "police procedural", "PI", "noir", "gangster", and "heist". The site is intended both for the general public and for research scholars.

== See also ==
- Crime_Writers_of_Canada
