= The Gateway (student magazine) =

Student newspaper of University of Alberta

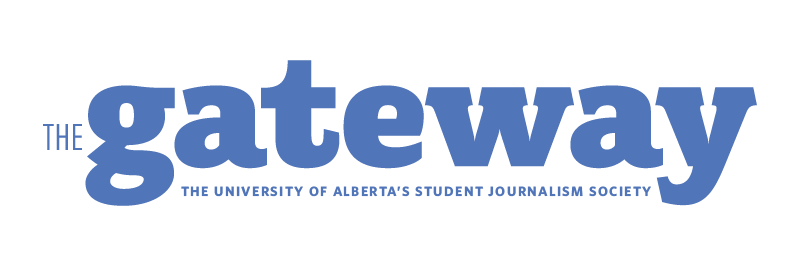
- Type: Student publication
- Format: Former Magazine, Online Newspaper
- Owner: Gateway Student Journalism Society
- Editor-in-chief: Leah Hennig
- Founded: November 21, 1910
- Headquarters: Suite 3-04 Students’ Union Building University of Alberta
- Circulation: 5,000
- ISSN: 0845-356X
- Website: thegatewayonline.ca

The Gateway is the student paper at the University of Alberta in Edmonton, Alberta, Canada. Since 2016, it is published once a month in a magazine format during the academic year (September–April) and on a regular basis online throughout the calendar year by the Gateway Student Journalism Society (GSJS), a student-run, autonomous, apolitical not-for-profit organization, operated in accordance with the Societies Act of Alberta.

The Gateway is one of the oldest student newspapers in Canada, founded in 1910 as a twice-a-week publication in newspaper format. Its alumni include Don Iveson, later a Mayor of Edmonton; Joe Clark, later a Prime Minister of Canada; Beverley McLachlin, later the Chief Justice of Canada; clinical psychologist Jordan Peterson; and countless journalists across Canada and the world.

== History ==
The magazine was originally formatted as a newspaper, but shifted to a magazine format in January 2016, though its nameplate continues to say "The University of Alberta's Official Student Newspaper". (see "Ownership and Operations").

The newspaper was founded in North Garneau at the home of Libby Lloyd on October 26, 1910. A group of students had gathered to discuss the creation of a student newspaper. They came up with the name "The Gateway" and selected A.E. Ottewell as its first editor-in-chief. The first issue was published on November 21, 1910.

According to the newspaper's first editorial, the name "Gateway" was chosen because "there is something unique about our position in this institution, the university farthest north in America and farthest West in Canada, standing at the portal of a great undeveloped and practically unknown region, rich in potentialities of future greatness."

In 1938, The Gateway became a founding member of Canadian University Press (CUP), a non-profit news wire service owned by post-secondary student newspapers across Canada. The Gateway hosted CUP national conferences in January 1979, January 2005, and January 2010.

== Ownership and operations ==
From its first published issue in 1910 until 2002, the Gateway was run as a department of the University of Alberta Students' Union. In 2002, the paper ran a successful referendum campaign for its autonomy and became an independent entity run by the Gateway Student Journalism Society (GSJS). In the period when the union was responsible for the paper, the University of Alberta had no editorial control over The Gateway, and by law the union was responsible for the production; the Universities Act of the Province of Alberta dictated that the student union was a corporate body separate from the university.

While most of the day-to-day operations did not change with autonomy, a board of directors (BOD) took over the major decision-making powers for the paper from a Students' Union committee and the vice-president (Student Life).

The paper is funded by a combination of advertising revenue and a student levy approved at the time of the autonomy campaign. The Gateway features sections devoted to news, opinion, sports, arts and entertainment, comics and features.

The Gateway has been published primarily as a twice-weekly publication, appearing on campus on most Tuesdays and Thursdays during the fall and winter terms. During the Spring and Summer sessions, the Gateway publishes a reduced schedule with a reduced circulation.

Each December, the Getaway is published (notice the different spelling), which features satirical articles and non sequiturs. The Getaway is a no-holds-barred publication, each issue containing considerable profanity and sexual content. Additionally, a joke issue spoofing a different newspaper or magazine is run every year at the end of the winter term.

The Gateway launched a new website, The Gateway Online, on 27 February 2007.

On February 17, 2011, the GSJS board of governors voted to change The Gateway to weekly publishing for the 2011/2012 publication year, moving the paper down from twice-weekly publishing for the first time since the 1930s.

In January 2016, in order to combat the declining relevance of newsprint media, The GSJS board of directors voted to shift to a monthly publishing schedule that featured eight magazines per publishing year and an increased focus on digital publishing and social media presence. Cam Lewis, the editor-in-chief who orchestrated the organization's shift, said the goal was to lead the way in a change in climate that everybody was going to have to face eventually, citing a decline in ad revenue and an increase in the use of digital mediums as reasons for the change.

Josh Greshner, the 2016–17 editor-in-chief, produced the first publication year of The Gateway magazine.

The final newspaper edition of The Gateway was released on April 5, 2016. The issue's cover featured a Space Moose cartoon drawn by Adam Thrasher and a four-page feature with testimonials from multiple Gateway alumni about their memories of the newspaper.

== Gateway Student Journalism Society ==
The Gateway Student Journalism Society is the body that oversees the budget and overall operation of the Gateway. Its board of directors consists of eleven voting members (the "editor-in-chief" of the newspaper, an editors' representative, two volunteer representatives, a representative of Students' Council, the SU Vice-President (Operations and Finance), two "continuity" representatives, a community representative, and two students-at-large). A Secretary, Treasurer, and Chair of the BOD are selected from the voting members.

== Gateway Alumni Association ==
In early 2004, Gateway alumnus Steve Lillebuen approached the University of Alberta to officially recognize a Gateway Alumni Association (GAA), and by March of that year the GAA became an official chapter of the University of Alberta Alumni Association.

Since then, the GAA has tracked down 800 lost alumni, hosted the Gateway's 95th and 100th anniversary dinners, and completed an online digital archive of the newspaper in partnership with the University of Alberta library.

All former paid staff of the newspaper are members of the Association. Any volunteer who contributed five or more submissions—writing, photographs, graphics, comics, administrative or editorial assistance and design—that appeared in the Gateway is also a member. It is estimated that over 3000 people have volunteered at one point in the Gateway's publishing history.

== Notable alumni ==
- Malcolm Azania (pen name: Minister Faust), author, writer, and community activist
- Todd Babiak, CEO of Brand Tasmania, former Edmonton Journal columnist and Giller Prize-nominated author
- Billy-Ray Belcourt, Rhodes Scholar and award-winning poet
- Joe Clark (1979), former Progressive Conservative prime minister of Canada
- Cam Cole, Vancouver Sun and National Post sports columnist
- Matthew Halton, the late CBC Radio WWII reporter, known as the "Voice of Canada"
- Lou Hyndman, former University of Alberta chancellor
- Don Iveson, former mayor of Edmonton, Alberta
- Jason Kapalka, co-founder of PopCap Games and creator of Bejeweled
- Gerard Kennedy, former Liberal Party of Canada leadership candidate and MP
- Arthur Kroeger, former deputy minister
- Peter Lougheed, former Alberta premier
- Beverley McLachlin, former chief justice of the Supreme Court of Canada
- Stephen Notley, creator of Bob the Angry Flower
- Jordan Peterson, Canadian clinical psychologist
- Adam Thrasher, University of Houston associate professor of health and human performance

== Notable comics ==
- Bub Slug by Gary Delainey and Gerry Rasmussen, which later became Betty, an internationally syndicated comic strip.
- Space Moose by Adam Thrasher
- Bob the Angry Flower by Steve Notley
- Colby Christ by Donald R. "Don" Husereau – Depicts Colby Cosh
- Editorial cartoons by Gerard Kennedy, 1979–83 (later Liberal MP and Liberal-leadership candidate)

== See also ==
- List of student newspapers in Canada
- List of newspapers in Canada
