= Mark Twitchell =

Canadian filmmaker (born 1979)

- Twitchell in an undated photo from his MySpace personal page.
- Born: Mark Andrew Twitchell; July 4, 1979 (age 47); Edmonton, Alberta, Canada
- Other name: "The Dexter Killer"
- Occupation: Former Filmmaker
- Spouses: Megan Casterella (m. 2001; div. 2005) Jess Twitchell (m. 2007; div. 2010)
- Children: 1
- Status: Imprisoned at Bowden Institution
- Motive: Desire to reenact the TV series Dexter and their protagonist Dexter Morgan
- Criminal charge: First-degree murder
- Penalty: 25 years to life imprisonment

Mark Andrew Twitchell (born July 4, 1979) is a former Canadian filmmaker convicted of first-degree murder in April 2011 for the murder of John Brian Altinger. Nicknamed the Dexter Killer by the media, his trial attracted particular media attention because Twitchell had allegedly been inspired by the fictional character Dexter Morgan.

== Early life and filmmaking ambitions ==
Born in Edmonton, Alberta, Twitchell dreamed of making blockbuster films and graduated from the Radio and Television Arts program at the Northern Alberta Institute of Technology in 2000. In January 2001, Twitchell married an American woman, Megan Casterella. They divorced due to irreconcilable differences in 2005. In January 2007, Twitchell married his second wife, Jess. The marriage ended after Twitchell’s arrest and the divorce was finalized in 2010.

Through his company Xpress Entertainment, in 2007, Twitchell directed Star Wars: Secrets of the Rebellion, a full-length fan film prequel set a few days prior to Star Wars Episode IV: A New Hope. Secrets of the Rebellion included a cameo by Jeremy Bulloch, a British actor best known for his role as bounty hunter Boba Fett in the original Star Wars films. The film, still in post-production, never saw release. Twitchell also scripted Day Players, a buddy comedy. In September 2008, he shot a short horror film entitled House of Cards at a garage he rented in the south end of Edmonton.

== Murder of Johnny Altinger ==
In October 2008, John Brian Altinger, a 38-year old from White Rock, British Columbia, living in Edmonton, Alberta while working as a QC inspector at Argus Machine Co. Ltd. (an oilfield equipment manufacturer) unknowingly interacted with Twitchell on the dating website Plenty of Fish. Twitchell was posing as a woman on the site in an attempt to lure victims to a garage, which he had rented to use as a film studio, in order to kill them. On October 10, 2008, Altinger informed his friends of his plans to meet the woman he believed he was chatting with and sent them the address Twitchell had provided him. Upon Altinger's arrival, Twitchell bludgeoned and stabbed him to death. Twitchell attempted unsuccessfully to burn the body. When this failed, he cut Altinger's remains into pieces. He then put the dismembered remains into garbage bags and dumped them into a storm sewer south of 130th Avenue and 87th Street (Edmonton, Alberta).

Altinger's friends became concerned after they received emails purportedly from Altinger which claimed that his date had taken him on an extended vacation to Costa Rica. Twitchell had broken into Altinger's condominium to send these emails. Twitchell also sent a resignation email to Altinger's work, but did not respond to a request for a forwarding address for sending Altinger's final paycheque. Altinger's friends broke into his condominium, where they found his passport, dirty dishes, and no indication of his having packed for a trip. A homicide investigation was soon launched by the Edmonton Police Service.

Twitchell claimed that he had met Altinger by chance. According to Twitchell, Altinger was accompanying a wealthy woman to Costa Rica and had no further need of his Mazda 6. Altinger supposedly sold the vehicle to Twitchell for the cash Twitchell had on hand, $40. Disbelieving Twitchell's account, the police impounded Twitchell's laptop and car and found Altinger's blood in the car's trunk. Police arrested Twitchell on October 31, 2008, and charged him with the first-degree murder of Altinger.

== Trial and sentencing ==
The key piece of evidence presented by the Crown at Twitchell's first-degree murder trial was a document, entitled "SKConfessions", which stood for "Serial Killer Confessions". The document had been recovered from Twitchell's laptop, despite having been deleted. The document begins with the passage:

This story is based on true events. The names and events were altered slightly to protect the guilty. This is the story of my progression into becoming a serial killer.

It presented an account of its narrator's planning, failed first attempt, and successful second attempt to lure a man to his garage and murder him using fake online dating profiles as bait. It went on to describe the process of dismembering the body and attempts to dispose of the remains.

During his trial, Twitchell admitted to killing Altinger and authoring the document, but claimed he had acted in self-defence. He described the document as fiction based on fact, as if he had planned Altinger's death deliberately, in order to create a compelling story.

During the trial, Twitchell's interest in the television series Dexter was noted repeatedly, and his personal identification with its lead character, Dexter Morgan, a vigilante serial killer, prompted several media outlets to refer to him as the "Dexter Killer."

Another document found on Twitchell's laptop did not make its way into the evidence file for the jury to read during his trial. Entitled "A Profile of a Psychopath", and believed by investigators to have been written by Twitchell, it is a detailed self-analysis of personality and behavior. On April 12, 2011, Twitchell was convicted of first-degree murder for the death of Altinger, and sentenced to life in prison without possibility of parole for 25 years.

== Attempted murder charge ==
Twitchell still faced an attempted murder charge for his alleged attack on Gilles Tetreault, a computer company contractor. Tetreault testified that he was lured using the website Plenty of Fish, expecting a date with a young woman named Sheena, only to be attacked by a man in a hockey mask with a stun baton when he arrived at the garage in Edmonton rented by Twitchell. After a violent struggle, Tetreault escaped, but did not report the attack to police. Tetreault claims that he did not report the attack because he was embarrassed. Tetreault was nicknamed "The One Who Got Away" by several media outlets, and published a book recounting his experience by the same title.

Crown prosecutors considered pursuing a charge of attempted murder after securing a conviction of first-degree murder. Detectives were adamant that they had gathered a mountain of evidence – much of it revealed during the murder trial – while even Twitchell himself admitted on the witness stand to committing the attack. In preparing the case for trial, the Crown had argued in court for the attempted murder and first-degree murder charges to be heard simultaneously as they were part of the same "transaction" of his attempt to become a serial killer. Under Canadian law, charges can only be heard together if they are linked in some way. Court of Queen's Bench Justice Terry Clackson was not convinced by the prosecution's argument that the attack on Gilles Tetreault and the murder of Johnny Altinger were part of the same transaction. He ordered the charges to be severed and heard separately. "The offences are related and connected, but remain discrete," Justice Clackson wrote in his reasons for the decision, "As a result, the attempted murder charge cannot stand on the same indictment as the charge of murder because they are different transactions." On June 17, 2011, an attempted murder charge against Twitchell was stayed in the Court of Queen's Bench of Alberta, meaning that Crown prosecutors could resurrect the charge within a one-year period. Since his conviction of first-degree murder secured a maximum sentence — life in prison with no parole eligibility for 25 years — there was no need to proceed with more charges, and the attempted murder charge against Twitchell was eventually dropped.

== Media coverage ==
=== During trial ===
Extensive media coverage of the case created debate both inside and outside of the courtroom. Observers argued for and against the media's reporting on the more sensational details of the crime.

Prior to the criminal trial, Crown prosecutors and the defense sought vast publication bans and sealing orders over the police evidence, preventing the media from reporting on the details of the case until the jury would hear it during the future trial. The media fought the application, but the judge agreed to both a sealing order and publication ban, stating in his ruling that "there is a real risk that pretrial publicity will undermine the accused's constitutionally protected right to a fair trial." The jury pool was then polled through a "challenge for cause" procedure to determine if a potential juror had been influenced by the media coverage prior to the publication bans taking effect. When the bans were lifted, a large media presence attended and reported on the trial, including American television programs Dateline NBC and 48 Hours.

Following his first-degree murder conviction, Twitchell used the extensive media coverage of his case as grounds for an appeal. He argued in his notice of appeal that "the media attention surrounding my case was so extensive, so blatant and so overtly sensationalized that it is unreasonable to expect any unsequestered jury to have remained uninfluenced by it, regardless of judges' instructions in the charge." He abandoned his appeal in 2012.

=== Post-trial ===
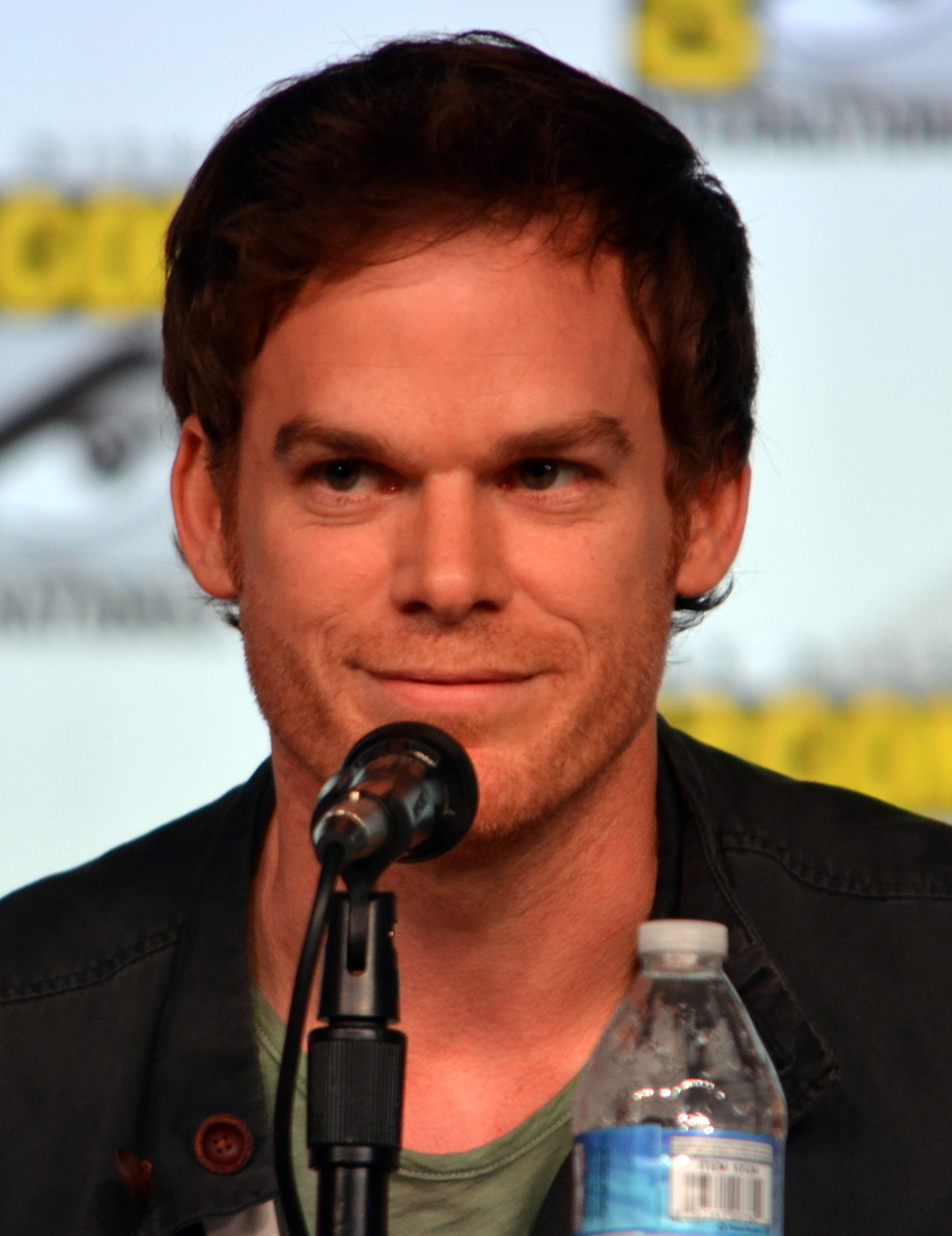
Michael C. Hall (pictured in 2012) says in the interview he was horrified by Twitchell's murder case.

In December 2012, Michael C. Hall, the actor who played Dexter Morgan, was interviewed by Jian Ghomeshi on the Canadian radio show Q. Hall stated that he did not think Dexter glamorized serial killers. "I would hope that people's appreciation was more than some sort of fetishization with the kill scenes," he said. Ghomeshi brought up Twitchell and Hall said, "I wouldn't stop making Dexter because someone was fascinated by it only in that way. I try to tell myself that their fixated nature would have done it one way or the other, but it seems that Dexter had something to do with it. It's horrifying."

In May 2013, it was reported that Twitchell had purchased a television for his prison cell. Twitchell stated that he had caught up on every Dexter episode that he missed since he was arrested and convicted of first-degree murder.

Twitchell's case was featured in the American magazine Crime Watch Daily on May 1, 2017. Much of that day's program focused on Twitchell's methods and featured interviews with Gilles Tetrault, his first intended victim, and Steve Lillebuen, author of the book The Devil's Cinema, which focused on the case. Part of the report included a return trip by Tetreault to the garage in which the incident had taken place.

Tetreault made several media appearances related to his experience, including Dateline NBC, 48 Hours Mystery, The Fifth Estate, I Survived... on Biography Channel, Dates from Hell on Investigation Discovery, and The Security Brief on REELZ.

== In popular culture ==
- The Devil's Cinema (2012) by Steve Lillebuen, a true crime account of the case and trial, written with the cooperation of Twitchell.
- The One Who Got Away (2015) by Gilles Tetreault, a personal account by the original intended target of Twitchell. 1st Edition. Triplicity Publishing. ISBN 978-0996899413; 2nd Edition. CreateSpace Independent Publishing Platform. ISBN 978-1539347736
- A film adaptation of The Devil's Cinema was acquired by film producer David Permut with Sam Hobkinson (Misha and the Wolves) set to direct.

== See also ==
- Internet homicide – Type of killing in which victim and perpetrator met online
- Copycat crime – Criminal act that is inspired by a previous crime
- Pedro Rodrigues Filho – Brazilian serial killer (1954–2023), the inspiration for Dexter Morgan.
- Manuel Pardo – American serial killer (1956–2012), another person who inspired Dexter Morgan
- Eaton Township Weis Markets shooting – Shooting attack in Pennsylvania, U.S., where the gunman expressed a belief that he would be reborn as a character from the show Danny Phantom
- Murder of Jun Lin – 2012 murder in Montreal, Canada, where the perpetrator took inspiration from the film Basic Instinct.
