= Space Moose =

Canadian underground comic strip

Cover of the collection Triumph of the Whim

Space Moose is a Canadian underground comic strip that appeared in the University of Alberta's student newspaper, The Gateway, between October 3, 1989, and 1999. Almost all of the strips were penned by Adam Thrasher, a student at the university. For career-related reasons, many archives refer to the author by his post-production pen name "Mustafa Al-Habib". Macleans Canada said that Space Moose "was deliberately provocative". Ellen Schoek, the author of I Was There: A Century of Alumni Stories about the University of Alberta, 1906–2006, said that Space Moose "left no subject unscathed, from fraternities to Christianity and obesity, from sexual proclivities to racism". In addition to The Gateway, the newspapers of the University of Manitoba (The Manitoban) and Langara College (The Gleaner) also carried Space Moose.

The strip follows the adventures of Space Moose, an anthropomorphic, nihilistic moose with asymmetrical eyes and a Star Trek uniform, as he violates every possible societal and behavioral norm. His roommates Marlo Smefner, Billy the Bionic Badger, and Bald Dwarf are often the accomplices or victims of his actions. Macleans Canada said that Space Moose was "probably the most famous comic strip character in Canadian university history".

A book collection, Triumph of the Whim, was published in late 1997. It consists of 94 pages of selected existing Space Moose cartoons and 6 pages of previously unpublished Space Moose strips. Most strips were available on the Space Moose web site.

== History ==
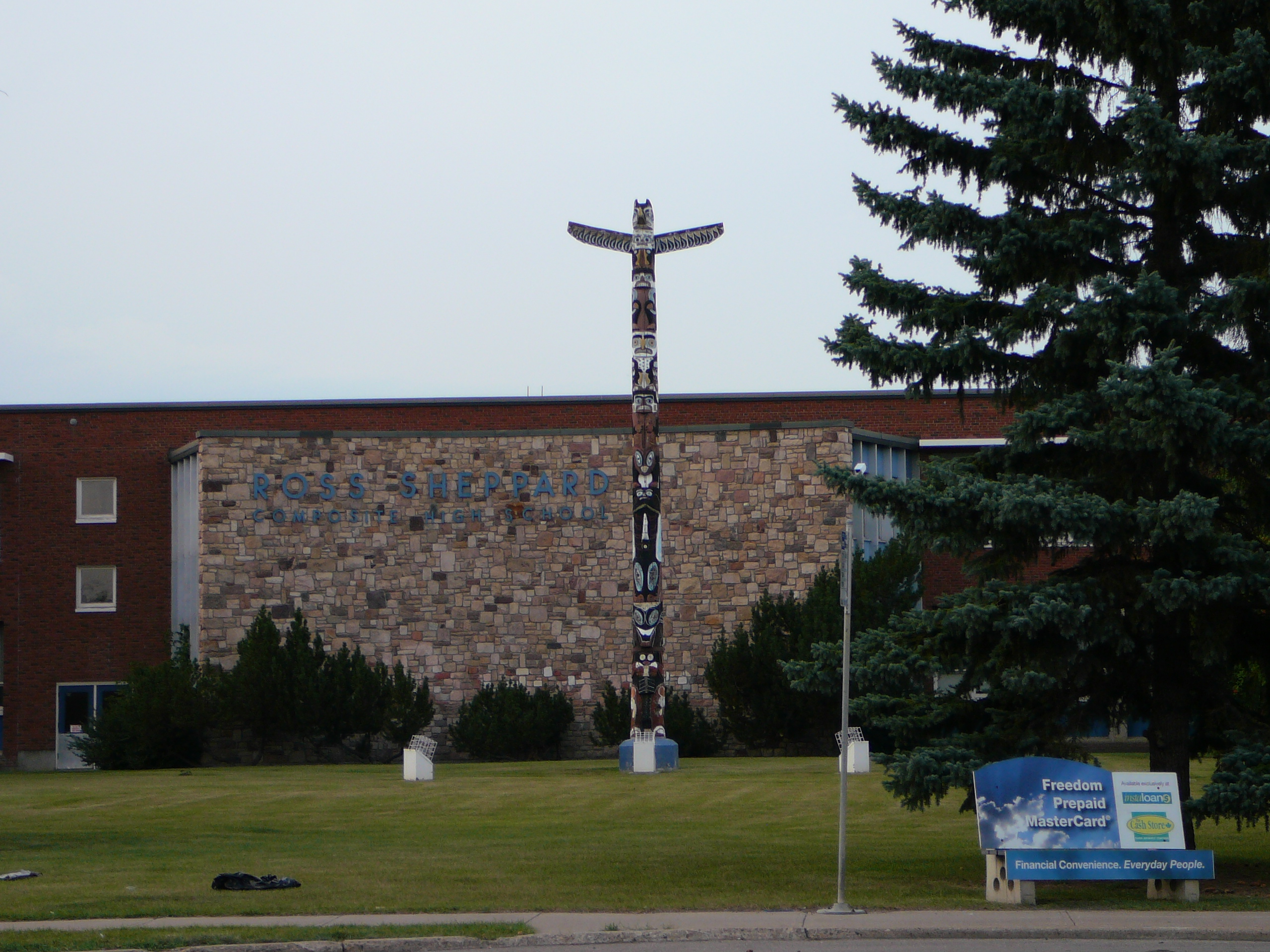
Thrasher originally created Space Moose while enrolled at Ross Sheppard High School in Edmonton.

Thrasher said that he began drawing Space Moose while enrolled at Ross Sheppard High School in Edmonton in order to make a friend laugh. The first Space Moose comic premiered in the October 3, 1989, edition of The Gateway. In 1991 Thrasher left the University of Alberta and worked for Northwestern Utilities in Edmonton; during the four months he worked with the company, he did not produce any Space Moose comics, and the school newspaper replaced Space Moose's slot with Colby Christ, a comic about Colby Cosh, a friend of Thrasher. When Thrasher returned to the university, Colby Christ was replaced by Space Moose, which had resumed. Thrasher and Donald R. "Don" Husereau drew "Colby Christ meets Space Moose", a strip that was a segue between the series.

In 1997, Space Moose ran for Students' Union President and finished a close third with 1,400 votes (only 11 votes behind the second place candidate, Hoops Harrison). This led to changes being made in students' union rules that would prevent any future "joke" candidate from actually winning an election. Due to the increasing popularity of the cartoon, people took away Space Moose's campaign posters as collector's items.

Around 1997, the comic received 10,000 visits per month. In 1997, due to a controversy involving the strip "Clobberin' Time", the comic was moved from University of Alberta biomedical department servers to private servers. Thrasher said that Darkcore Networks, a web host in Edmonton and a subsidiary of OA Internet, one of the largest internet service providers in Edmonton, invited Thrasher to post his comics there. Thrasher established a new website which housed over 170 Space Moose comic strips, including "Clobberin' Time". The website included an advertising banner from Microsoft. It also had a hit counter which, as of September 10, 1998, stated that the site had been accessed 17,800 times since November 1997. The website included a section called "Clobberin'", about the controversial comic strip. The section invited readers to "fume with the feminists who banned Space Moose from the university network".

A cartoon that was printed in The Gateway, "Antlers of the Damned", depicting an angel and featuring a dog sodomizing Space Moose. As a result, the University of Alberta campus chaplains published a joint letter of recrimination. Another Space Moose cartoon, that depicted Snow White facing sodomy at the hands of the Seven Dwarves, was published in Slur, a punkzine. As a result, A&B Sound withdrew its advertising from Slur and banned the magazine from its stores.

=== Author biography ===
Thrasher was born on September 9, 1971, in London, Ontario. He and his family moved to Edmonton when he was 10 years old. Thrasher received his bachelor's degree in mechanical engineering at the University of Alberta in 1994. Thrasher was scheduled to receive his doctorate in 2000. Cosh said "His need to complete his doctoral thesis explains the shocking paucity of strips in 1999." He received his PhD in medical sciences in 2002. As of 2011 Thrasher is now a professor at the University of Houston.

=== "Clobberin' Time" controversy ===
Macleans Canada stated that the most controversial strip in Space Moose's history was "Clobberin' Time", which satirized the Take Back the Night march, an annual event held on Jasper Avenue in Edmonton to protest violence perpetrated by men against women. In that strip Space Moose prepares to attack demonstrators, and opens fire on women in the rally while using a machine gun, hitting his targets. A large masculine-appearing woman captures Space Moose, and in the following strip he is incarcerated in a "Womyn's Studies re-education camp". There he is forced to constantly watch reruns of Dr. Quinn, Medicine Woman.

In October 1997, The Gateway refused to publish the strip "Clobberin' Time". The strip was nevertheless available on the cartoonist's web site, which was hosted on university servers, and The Gateway mentioned the URL which led to the comic strip. The strip's presence ignited a controversy across many campuses.

Nine women said that they felt frightened by the strip, and asked the university administration to take action. The women, including faculty and students, wrote ten letters to the president of the University of Alberta. One of the complainants, a University of Alberta political science professor named Linda Trimble, said that "I was shocked. I was upset. I was amazed that someone would draw such a misogynist, hateful cartoon. This is trivialization of a hate crime." The university governed the web servers which hosted Space Moose, so it took action to remove the comic from its servers. Burton Smith, the acting dean of students, said that the administration asked Thrasher to voluntarily remove the comic strip from the university servers, and that if he did so, he would continue to be able to use his university computer account. Thrasher moved his comic to a privately hosted web server in Edmonton. The controversy garnered media attention throughout Canada. Thrasher said "I'm an underground cartoonist -- I've always tried to keep a low profile."

Some members of the University of Alberta community complained about the activities of The Gateway in relation to the controversy to the university administration. The University of Alberta had no editorial control over The Gateway, and by law the publisher, the University of Alberta Students' Union, was responsible for the production. The Universities Act of the province of Alberta dictated that the student union was a corporate body separate from the university. Therefore, Burton Smith asked that complaints about the newspaper's activities be directed to the union, rather than to the university administration.

==== Disciplinary proceeding and appeal ====
The administration started disciplinary proceedings against Thrasher. In December 1997 the administration charged Thrasher with discrimination against women as per the university's code of student conduct. The author was sent to a university disciplinary hearing. On December 15, 1997, Gretchen C. Hess, the university's discipline officer, reviewed the university's charges. Hess declared Thrasher guilty of violating s. 30A.3.2 of the Code of Student Behaviour, and the university punished Thrasher by issuing him a written reprimand that said "We reprimand Mr. Thrasher for failing to treat women with dignity and respect. In future, Mr. Thrasher should be more sensitive to some members of his reading audience in his depiction of issues" and that he would be fined $200 ($359.69 when adjusted for inflation) by making a contribution of that amount to the Graduate Students' Association Food Bank. After the fine was announced, Thrasher said that he had no intention of immediately paying the fine and that he would seek legal advice from Student Legal Services. He also stated that he had no intention of withdrawing from the university.

On January 23, 1998, Thrasher filed an appeal against the university's decision. The appeal hearing began on Monday September 28, 1998. It was supposed to conclude that afternoon, but the meeting ran too long and had to be adjourned. The meeting was scheduled to conclude on Thursday October 8, 1998. Five of the women who had initially sent complaints against Thrasher testified during the appeal hearing. The appeal process was completed on Monday November 2, 1998, with the university overturning the charges against Thrasher. The front page of the November 5, 1998 The Gateway stated "Space Moose Beats the Rap". According to Thrasher, he spent around $300 ($539.54 when adjusted for inflation), which was more than the fine, even though his lawyer had worked pro bono. Thrasher said that he spent the money on the appeals because he was attacking censorship and that he, as an artist, had a responsibility to do so. The University Appeal Board announced that it reversed the punishment decision on November 20, 1998.

==== Interpretation and reception ====
Adam Thrasher argued that the "Take Back the Night" marches cause polarization in gender relations, since women discourage men from participating. Thrasher said, as paraphrased by Dan Lazin of The Gateway, that "unthinking men may be incited to further hatred towards women." Thrasher argued that while the strips criticize "the ideas of some hard-core feminists", they are not against all women. Thrasher added that "The reason I did it is because it's such a taboo to make fun of violence against women, against Take Back the Night." Thrasher also stated that "When I drew up the cartoon, I wasn't thinking about Marc Lepine [and the Montreal massacre] which was a crime against humanity, I think, more than a crime against women."

A Saturday October 25, 1997, editorial of The Globe and Mail argued that the actions against Thrasher were censorship and that "the instinct to block the juvenile humour was more disturbing than the juvenalia itself." The Alberta Report said in 1997 that "Space Moose is a festival of caricatured scatology, violence, perversion, irreligion and even pedophilia. It has stimulated outrage before, but in five years the university had never suppressed the strip, despite lampoons of University institutions, Trekkies, the mentally retarded, and Christians. Only one group, it seems, has the clout to make the university turn censor."

In response to Thrasher's argument that the marches could polarize gender relations and that the comic had a different message than perceived, Gretchen Hess said that the intent of the strip was not easily discernible and that the effect of the strip should be considered in addition to the intent. Linda Trimble argued that "[t]he pretty direct message of the cartoon [was] 'It's open season on feminists. Kill all the women.'" Joyce Green, a University of Regina political science professor who was another complainant, argued that "I don't see any difference between [the Montreal Massacre] and the cartoon." Green added that the group had complained about the strips "not because we're paranoid but because we're terrified." Shannon Sampert, a political science student who was another one of the complainants, said that she was not surprised that the appeal went in favor of Thrasher. She believed that additional students would try to take the course of action that Thrasher took, and she believed that feminists would cause an outcry against the appeals.

Brice Smith, a graduate student in the Massachusetts Institute of Technology Department of Physics, said in The Tech in 2001 that "[t]he first strip, taken alone, would have been a brilliant use of sarcasm that very sharply points out the need for such events", but that the second strip "mocks the women’s demands to feel safe and to be free from rape, and then follows this up with the men brutally attacking the women, killing many quite graphically[...]" Brice Smith argued that "One almost does not even know where to begin addressing this kind of hate-filled message. For me, the most horrifying aspect is its total disregard for the very real extent of violence by men against women."

In regards to the university code of conduct, Green and Trimble argued that it needed to be amended so that it would prohibit future strips like "Clobberin' Time". Thrasher said that the code was unclear, even though it does not remove rights from the university community or members of the university. Thrasher argued that the code needed to be amended to make it clearer. In regards to the inclusion of the URL in The Gateway, Sampert argued that the editors "did a really scabby way of censoring but promoting at the same time." Rose Yewchuk, the editor of The Gateway, argued that the Space Moose comic that was published in that issue would not have made sense to the reader unless the reader saw the previous comic, therefore the newspaper published the address.

== Development ==
Space Moose was originally created for the entertainment of Paul Diedrich, a friend of Thrasher. Diedrich coined the name "Space Moose". Thrasher said "I drew this thing with all the stereotypes of a goofy character--lopsided googly eyes, buck teeth that hang out, and antlers." At first, Space Moose was a collaboration between Thrasher, Thrasher's friend Jason Kapalka, and Donald R. "Don" Husereau, a pharmacy student. After drawing one Space Moose cartoon, Husereau left the strip's production but continued to be an advisor. For the first year, Thrasher collaborated with friend Jason Kapalka. After the first year, Thrasher did the strip alone.

Originally Thrasher used materials from his mother's office to create the comics. As the comic progressed, he began using a black Sanford uniball to ink. The creator pencilled lightly with a very hard lead, such as a 5H. The paper used was ordinary 20-pound (9.1 kg) sets of bleached paper. In addition Thrasher used a portable drawing board with a T-square.

Thrasher said "My cartoons, more often than not, challenge the reader to think about things that are horrible, reprehensible and irredeemable. If I have achieved that, there seems to be only two possible reactions: anger or laughter. I aim for the latter and put up with the former."

Thrasher said that his influences include Scott Adams, author of Dilbert; Matt Groening, author of The Simpsons; and Gary Larson, author of The Far Side. Colby Cosh said "[h]e's glad they pushed the envelope to allow biting cartoonists such as him to thrive." Thrasher said "When I grew up, newspaper comics were sickly sweet." Thrasher believed that Family Circus, Marmaduke, and Ziggy were "offensively lame".

The first year of Space Moose had obscure references to many Edmonton-based bulletin board system participants. Cosh said "That's why those strips mostly make no sense. They're in-jokes that got into the campus paper for some reason. Quality control was a real problem then, as now." Cosh added "Adam would prefer that you just ignore the 1989–90 episodes of Space Moose. With respect to Jason Kapalka's gag writing, the real jumping-off point for "Space Moose" is the ingenious "Calvin and Slobbes", the first strip of 1990–91."

Originally Space Moose had a head of hair. In 1993 Thrasher dropped the hair, because he felt the character looked better with a bald head. Thrasher added "Sometimes, the hair is useful--for example, in the "Summertime tips" strip, where he slicked it back to look suave, or in "Extreme Space Moose," where the mane looks like fire and adds intensity to the drawing."

The word "bee" often occurs in the strip, and sometimes a developmentally disabled man appears. This is based on Thrasher's experience while riding on a school bus with a boy with Down syndrome. The boy often sung softly; Thrasher later learned that the boy was trying to say the word "bee" using different pitches and tones. After the discovery, Thrasher decided to introduce the word in his vocabulary, with different tones leading to different meanings.

== Characters ==
- Space Moose - Space Moose is an anthropomorphic, nihilistic moose with asymmetrical eyes and a Star Trek uniform who violates every behavioral norm and societal taboo he can find. A native of the planet Olmak, he was sent to earth and raised by the Moose family in Canada. Moose chose to attend the University of Alberta. Thrasher said "Four years later, with a zoology degree in hand, Space Moose made his boyhood dreams come true and became the Generation X version of Merlin Perkins." In the Space Moose FAQ, when asked about Space Moose's sexuality, Thrasher said "My personal opinion is that Space Moose simply likes illicit sex. Since gay coitus is so taboo (and since most of his friends happen to be male), that is the brand he most often indulges in. Still, he is not exclusively gay, because he hits on Miranda [...] and he fantasizes about screwing women [...]." Thrasher explained that Space Moose believes that "[...] the best sex is sex that is perceived as wrong or inappropriate. Missexual?" Colby Cosh, a friend of Thrasher, said that in his view, "Space Moose was basically heterosexual but would do ANYTHING to create chaos." Cosh explained, "Chicks are what gives him spontaneous erections in shopping malls [cf. "Saved by the fat fuck"], but he'll drill glory holes in his own walls to piss people off [cf. "Glory holes"]. Obviously he does have a thing about anuses (ani?), but so do a lot of heterosexuals. Of course, there's also the fact that he is neither human nor even of Earthly origin. "Missexual" is definitely the best formulation I have seen." In 1997, Thrasher conducted a World Wide Web poll on Space Moose's sexuality. 42% of respondents said that it was "undefinable". 24% said "bisexual". 3% each said that Space Moose was "homosexual" and "asexual". Space Moose's Star Trek shirt had been coloured differently in different strips. Thrasher said "Since the colourizers can't even agree on Space Moose's own exact hue, and since Space Moose has never been given a formal Starfleet rank, speculation may proceed freely."
- Marlo Smefner - Thrasher said "Of Space Moose's cohorts, Marlo is probably the most normal" and "Having had somewhat of a moral upbringing, Marlo does not agree with Space's seek-and-destroy philosophy of life, and tries to curb the antlered one's nihilistic ventures whenever possible. Despite the animosity between them, Space Moose cannot help but see a little of himself in Marlo." Thrasher introduced Marlo in 1994. At first Thrasher intended for Marlo to be a one-time character, but then he realized that he could act as the comic's straight man. Several commentators asked Thrasher whether Marlo is supposed to represent him. Cosh explained "This may be because Adam often disavows Space Moose's own outlook on life." Thrasher responded that Marlo is not an avatar of himself.
- Billy the Bionic Badger - Billy, a honey badger, met Space Moose at the University of Alberta while participating in the university's engineering program. Thrasher said that Billy "underwent a series of surgeries which eventually replaced all his skeletal muscles with advanced silicon polymer servo-actuators, rendering him the world's strongest rodent." Cosh noted on the Space Moose FAQ that Thrasher was aware that badgers are not actually rodents.
- Bald Dwarf - A small man who attended the University of Alberta, Bald Dwarf often organizes equal rights parades for various socioeconomic groups.
