= Killing of Bich Pan =

2010 killing in Markham, Ontario, Canada

Murder of Bich Pan
- Jennifer Pan in 2010
- Date: November 8, 2010; 16 years ago
- Location: Unionville, Markham, Ontario, Canada; 43.8554°N 79.2990°W
- Type: Matricide by shooting, attempted parricide
- Motive: Financial gain; Parents' disapproval of boyfriend; Retaliation against parenting style
- Perpetrators: Jennifer Pan; David Mylvaganam; Eric Shawn Carty; Daniel Chi-Kwong Wong; Lenford Roy Crawford
- Deaths: Bich Pan
- Injuries: Hann Pan
- Charges: First-degree murder, attempted murder
- Convictions: Manslaughter, attempted murder, conspiracy to commit murder (Note: Only conspiracy to commit murder for Carty.)
- Sentence: Pan, Mylvaganam, Wong, Crawford: Life imprisonment with the possibility of parole Carty: 9-to-18 years in prison (died before completing sentence)
- Trial: February–December 2014
- Verdict: Guilty on all charges; First-degree murder conviction vacated on appeal, pending retrial; attempted murder upheld; All except Mylvaganam pleaded guilty to manslaughter

On November 8, 2010, police in Markham, Ontario, Canada, a suburb of Toronto, responded to a report of a robbery and assault at the Unionville home of Hann and Bich Pan, ethnically Chinese immigrants from Vietnam. Both had been shot repeatedly; Bich died of her injuries, and Hann was permanently blinded. The investigation revealed that the crime was not a robbery but instead a kill-for-hire arranged by the couple's daughter Jennifer Pan. She had expected to inherit her parents' money and was angered that they had forbidden her to see her boyfriend after they discovered she had been deceiving them about her education.

At trial, Pan was found guilty on multiple charges and sentenced to life imprisonment without the possibility of parole for 25 years, the same penalty as her co-conspirators. In May 2023, the Court of Appeal for Ontario ordered a retrial for Pan and her co-conspirators on the charge of first-degree murder of her mother, allowing for the possibility that – despite explicitly waiting until Bich was home before signalling the killers to enter – they might only have planned to murder Hann, and the jury should have been allowed to consider that option; the Court of Appeal upheld the attempted murder convictions for the shooting of Hann. Two years later, in April 2025, the Supreme Court of Canada sustained the appeal.

In 2026 the Crown was ordered to retry the four defendants charged in the killing then still alive. All pleaded guilty to lesser charges that made them immediately eligible for parole. As of April 2026, hitman David Mylvaganam has not yet been retried.

== Early life and education ==
Jennifer Pan's mother, Bich Ha Pan (pronounced "Bick"), (Note: Bich Ha Pan: Vietnamese: Phan Bích Hà, Luong: Vietnamese: Lương – In Chinese her maiden name is used: Chinese: 梁碧霞; Jyutping: loeng4 bik1 haa4; pinyin: Liáng Bìxiá) and father, Huei Hann Pan, (Note: Huei Hann Pan: Vietnamese: Phan Hán Huy traditional Chinese: 潘漢輝; simplified Chinese: 潘汉辉; Jyutping: pun1 hon3 fai1; pinyin: Pān Hànhuī) were ethnic Chinese refugees from Vietnam (Viet Hoa) to Canada. Hann was born and educated in Vietnam and moved to Canada in 1979 as a refugee. Bich also came to Canada as a refugee. The couple were married in Toronto and lived in Scarborough. Jennifer was born in 1986, and her brother Felix was born in 1989. The Pans found work at Magna International, an auto parts manufacturer in Aurora, Ontario. Hann worked as a tool and die maker, while Bich made car parts. By 2004, Hann and Bich purchased a house with a two-car garage on a residential street in Markham, a city in the Greater Toronto Area with a large East Asian population.

Jennifer's parents set many goals for their children and were said to have had extremely high expectations of them. Jennifer was made to take music theory and harmony lessons at the age of 12, as well as figure skating classes, where she trained most days of the week. Her aspirations to become an Olympic figure skating champion ended when she tore a knee ligament. At Mary Ward Catholic Secondary School, Jennifer played flute in the school band. According to her high school friend Karen K. Ho, Hann was seen as "the classic tiger dad," and Bich was "his reluctant accomplice." The Pans picked Jennifer up at the end of school each day and closely monitored her extracurricular activities. They never permitted her to date while attending high school or attend dances out of fear that these activities would distract from her academic commitments. Jennifer was also not permitted to attend any parties during the time her parents believed she was at university. At 22, "she had never gone to a club, been drunk, visited a friend's cottage or gone on vacation without her family." Jennifer and her friends reportedly regarded this upbringing as restrictive and greatly oppressive.

Despite her parents' expectations that Jennifer receive good grades, in high school they were somewhat average (in the 70% range) except for music. By forging report cards, Jennifer deceived her parents into thinking she earned straight As. When Jennifer failed calculus class in grade 12, Ryerson University (officially renamed Toronto Metropolitan University in 2022) rescinded her early admission. As she could not bear to be perceived as a failure, Jennifer began to lie to those she knew, including her parents, and pretended she was attending university. She sat in cafés, taught piano, and worked in a restaurant to earn money. In order to maintain the charade, Jennifer told her parents she had won scholarships, later falsely claiming that she had accepted an offer into the pharmacology program at the University of Toronto. She went to the extent of purchasing second-hand textbooks and watching videos related to pharmacology in order to create notebooks full of purported class notes she could show her parents.

Jennifer also requested permission from her parents to stay near campus with a friend (actually her high school boyfriend, Daniel Chi-Kwong Wong, (Note: Daniel Chi-Kwong Wong: traditional Chinese: 黃志光; simplified Chinese: 黄志光; Jyutping: wong4 zi3 gwong1; pinyin: Huáng Zhìguāng) who later transferred to Cardinal Carter Academy in North York due to low grades) during the week. Wong, of mixed Chinese and Filipino ancestry, lived in Ajax. He was an active marijuana dealer and managed a Boston Pizza.

== Adult life ==
While pretending to study at Ryerson, Jennifer told her parents that she had started working as a volunteer at The Hospital for Sick Children in Toronto. Hann and Bich soon became suspicious when they realized Jennifer did not have a hospital ID badge or uniform. Bich followed her daughter to "work" and quickly discovered her deception. Livid, Hann wanted to throw Jennifer out of the house, but Bich persuaded him to allow her to stay. As she had not completed high school, Jennifer eventually began working to finish high school and was later encouraged by her parents to apply to university. She was, however, forbidden to contact Wong due to his parents being from different ethnic backgrounds (according to Jennifer), or to go anywhere except for her piano-teaching job. The two still remained in discreet contact.

By 2009, Wong had grown weary of trying to pursue a relationship with Jennifer because of the restrictions imposed by her parents. Wong broke off the relationship and began to date another woman. After learning of this new relationship, Jennifer falsely informed Wong that a man had entered her house, showing what appeared to be a police badge, after which several men rushed in and gang-raped her. She claimed that after this a bullet was mailed to her, and that both of these events were arranged by Wong's new girlfriend.

== Attack on the Pan household ==
In spring 2010, Jennifer was in contact with Andrew Montemayor, a high school friend who, she claims, had boasted of robbing people at knifepoint (which he denies). He introduced her to Ricardo Duncan, a "goth kid," to whom Jennifer claims she paid $1,500 to kill her father in the parking lot at his workplace. Duncan said that she once gave him $200 for a night out, but he returned it, and rebuffed her entreaty to kill her parents.

Jennifer and Wong were back in contact at this time and, according to the police, they came up with a plan to hire a professional hitman for $10,000, calculating that she would then inherit $500,000. They planned to move in together. Wong connected Pan with Lenford Roy Crawford, a Jamaican-born man, and gave her a SIM card and iPhone so that she could contact Crawford without using her usual cell phone. Crawford in turn contacted another man, Eric Shawn "Sniper" Carty, from Rexdale, who in turn contacted Montreal-born David Mylvaganam. At trial, the Crown (prosecution) argued Mylvaganam was one of the hitmen. Carty was later convicted of an unrelated 2009 murder.

The murder took place at the Pan house in Markham's Unionville neighbourhood. On November 8, 2010, Jennifer unlocked the front door of the family home when she went to bed, spoke by phone to Mylvaganam, then turned the lights on and off to signal them to come in the house. Shortly afterward, Mylvaganam and two other people entered the home through the front door, all armed. In the court testimony, the Crown did not establish the identity of the other two hitmen; Wong and Crawford were at work.

Carty stated that he was the driver for those who broke into the house; he also selected them and was involved in plotting the attack. The identity of the triggerman remains unknown.

After demanding all of the money in the house and ransacking the main bedroom, the three men took Bich and Hann to the basement and shot them several times. Bich died, and Hann survived. The three men then took $2,000 from Jennifer and left. Jennifer claimed that they tied her up, but she managed to dial 9-1-1. Hann was treated at Markham Stouffville Hospital, before being moved to a trauma unit at Sunnybrook Hospital in Toronto, by air.

== Investigation and arrests ==
Police initially believed the family's wealth lured the perpetrators into the house, but they grew skeptical as numerous valuables had not been stolen. It also seemed unusual that Pan was left unharmed and had dialed 9-1-1 with her hands bound. The evening after the murder, police interviewed her. Hann later woke up from a coma, and he recalled to police that he saw Jennifer whispering to one of the hitmen in a friendly and soft manner. She was arrested on November 22, 2010, during her third interview. Jennifer admitted that she had hired the killers, but she claimed the plan was to kill her, not her parents. The interrogating officer, William "Bill" Goetz, used the Reid technique to obtain Pan's confession. He falsely told Pan that he had computer software that could analyse untruths in statements and that there were satellites with infrared technology to analyse movements in buildings; in Canada, police are legally allowed to lie to those they are interrogating regarding the evidence they have allegedly collected, and the strategies they are using.

Mylvaganam was arrested at the Jane Finch Mall in North York in April 2011. Carty was arrested at Maplehurst Correctional Complex in Milton, Ontario, several days later. Wong was arrested on April 26 at work. Crawford was the final suspect arrested, in Brampton the following month. Pan was held at Central East Correctional Centre in Lindsay, Ontario, while awaiting trial.

== Trials ==
The trial of Pan and her accomplices began in March 2014, in Newmarket; it lasted 10 months. All defendants pleaded not guilty to the charges of first degree murder, attempted murder, and conspiracy to commit murder. At the trial, York Regional Police evidence included exhaustive tracking of mobile device movements and text message traffic, including over 100 messages between Pan and Wong in the six hours prior to the killing. Further evidence focused on the atypical nature of the "break-in", "robbery", shootings, and irregularities in Jennifer's testimony. Her obsession with Wong, emotionless confession regarding the attack, and recognition of the trauma she underwent were also detailed. A major irregularity was that Jennifer was not assaulted, blindfolded, taken to the basement, nor shot, leaving behind an eyewitness to the attack. Hann's very different account also undermined her credibility. The trial included over 200 exhibits; over 50 witnesses testified.

Jennifer, Wong, Mylvaganam, and Crawford were all convicted and sentenced to 25 years to life.

Originally, Carty was tried with the other perpetrators. However, Edward Sapiano, his lawyer, fell ill, and in mid-2014, Carty's case was declared a mistrial. In December 2015, Carty received an 18-year sentence after pleading guilty to conspiring to commit murder, with eligibility for parole after nine years, but he died in prison in 2018. According to Carty, he did not wish to subject Hann Pan to another criminal trial.

The trial took 10 months, with the jury sequestered for the four days it took to reach its verdict. "I lived with daily thoughts of this crime", said foreman Patrick Fleming. "Graphic coroner photos of bullet holes through flesh, the bloody crime scenes and the chilling testimonies." He also recalled regularly reliving the moment he read the verdict, and the screams from the defendants and their families. The sequestration heightened the sense of isolation he felt upon returning home afterwards, as he had not been allowed to visit his father-in-law in the hospital and felt guilty for being unable to support his wife. Fleming later joined forces with another juror who was suing the federal and provincial governments over mental health issues from service on the jury in a different murder trial to advocate for mental-health support to be provided to jurors.

=== Penalties and imprisonment ===
Hann's son and Jennifer's brother Felix requested a restraining order to ban her from any further contact; it was granted over Jennifer's lawyers' objections. She is also banned from ever contacting Wong.

As of 2016, Pan was incarcerated at the Grand Valley Institution for Women in Kitchener. Wong, previously held at Lindsay, was held at Collins Bay Institution in Kingston. Mylvaganam was at Atlantic Institution in Renous, New Brunswick. Crawford was at Kent Institution in Agassiz, British Columbia. Carty, who was stabbed in prison after sentencing, requested to be sent to a federal prison in Western Canada or Atlantic Canada, to serve his two sentences – his murder conviction for his 2009 killing of former friend Kirk Matthews, and his conspiracy conviction for the murder of Bich Pan and attempted murder of Hann Pan; he was later moved to Kent, where he was found dead in his cell on April 26, 2018.

=== Successful appeals ===
In May 2023, the Court of Appeal for Ontario granted an appeal by Jennifer and her three co-conspirators on the first degree murder charge and ordered a new trial, on the grounds that the trial judge had incorrectly instructed the jury to only consider two scenarios, both of which would justify a first-degree murder conviction, instead of allowing them to consider other scenarios that would lead to lesser second-degree murder or even manslaughter convictions. The court also upheld the convictions for attempted murder of Hann.

The Supreme Court of Canada upheld the Court of Appeal's decision in April 2025, holding in a 7–2 majority opinion written by Chief Justice Richard Wagner that the jury should have been allowed to consider lesser included charges in the death of Bich, that Jennifer and her co-conspirators may have intended to kill only Hann, since no evidence offered at trial would be at odds with a jury finding that Bich's death might not have been intentional. "While there was strong evidence supporting the Crown's theory that both parents were targets," he wrote, "there was no undisputed evidence contradicting the idea that the plan was only to kill the father." Justice Andromache Karakatsanis, joined by Sheilah Martin, argued in their dissent that there was no air of reality to any theory that the defendants meant to kill only Hann, specifically noting that the crime had only occurred after Jennifer waited until Bich was home before notifying one of the other defendants that it was time to execute the plan, and that both Bich and Hann were led downstairs and covered with blankets before they were shot. "Even when J's evidence is taken at its most favourable," they wrote, "it is speculative to find that because J had less animus toward her mother and had months earlier planned the death of only her father, that the plan on the night in question was also to kill only her father."

=== Reduced convictions ===
Having been ordered to retry the four living co-conspirators in the killing of Bich Pan, the Crown allowed three to plead guilty to significantly lesser charges, with major sentence reductions. On February 2, 2026, Wong pleaded guilty to manslaughter, which still carries a term of life imprisonment but immediately made him eligible for parole, as compared to the 25-year minimum mandated by his original first-degree murder conviction. This makes Wong eligible for parole.

On March 13, Crawford was allowed to plead guilty to the lesser charge of conspiracy to commit murder, reducing his original sentence of 25 years without parole to a straight 15 years, coincidentally meaning that his full 15-year sentence was completed the very next day. That same day, the due course of his original 25-year sentence for the attempted murder of Hann, without eligibility for parole for 15 years, meant that he was immediately eligible to apply for parole.

Five days later, the Crown allowed Pan to plead guilty to the lesser charge of manslaughter in the killing of her mother. That still carries a term of life imprisonment, but now allows for Pan to be eligible for possible parole in less than the 25 years originally mandated by her first-degree murder conviction. Pan's other convictions, associated with the shooting of her father, remain.

== Aftermath ==
Bich Ha Pan's funeral was held in November 2010 at the Ogden Chapel in Scarborough. A funeral for Bich's father was held, according to Jennifer, prior to Bich's funeral to satisfy a Chinese custom that older members of the family have their funerals first. Jennifer had been asked to organize both funerals. Bich was buried on November 19. Hann could not attend due to his injuries.

== Media coverage ==
According to the South China Morning Post, the case "sent shockwaves across Canada and the Asian diaspora." An editorial in the Northwest Asian Weekly suggested consideration of the "idea of recognizing the mental and psychological symptoms that parenting may have gone too far" in the Pan household. A story in Toronto Life magazine brought the case to widespread attention, framing it as an instance of tiger parenting gone tragically wrong.

In 2016, journalist Jeremy Grimaldi published a true crime book about Pan called A Daughter's Deadly Deception: The Jennifer Pan Story. Numerous podcasts, including Casefile, My Favorite Murder, Wine and Crime, "True Crime and Cocktails", and the Deadly Women series also covered the case. Law and Order Toronto: Criminal Intent Season 2, Episode 5 "Face Value" is constructed around the Pan case.

In 2024, Netflix released What Jennifer Did, a documentary about the case. Directed and written by Jenny Popplewell, it interviews police officers and people around Pan and contains footage from her police interviews. Shortly after its release, several news outlets reported that Netflix had apparently used AI-generated images of Pan in the documentary without disclosing this information. In an interview with the Toronto Star, executive producer Jeremy Grimaldi denied the allegation. He said distortions to the images were caused by the use of photo editing software to anonymize the photos to protect the identity of the source who supplied them.

== See also ==
- Jean-Claude Romand – a French impostor who pretended to be a medical doctor for 18 years before killing his family when he was about to be exposed
- Murder of Peter Porco – convicted for the murder of his father, attempted murder of his mother
- Parricide – Intentional killing of one's parent(s)
- Sef Gonzales – a similar case involving a Filipino-Australian young adult who killed his parents and made it look like a hate crime.
- Suzane von Richthofen – a Brazilian woman who planned the killing of her parents
- Thomas Bartlett Whitaker – an American man who ordered a hit on his family after he faked continuing attending a university
- Dana Ewell – a California man who arranged the execution of his family after lying about business success while at college
- Henry Chow Hoi-leung – a Hong Kong man convicted of murdering his parents
