= The Devil's Cinema =

Non-fiction book by Steve Lillebuen

- Author: Steve Lillebuen
- Language: English
- Genre: True crime
- Publisher: McClelland & Stewart
- Publication date: March 2012
- Publication place: Canada
- Media type: Print (hardcover and eBook)
- Pages: 352
- ISBN: 978-0771050336

The Devil's Cinema: The Untold Story Behind Mark Twitchell's Kill Room is a true crime book by journalist and author Steve Lillebuen. The book is a work of narrative nonfiction. In May 2013, the book won "Best Non-Fiction" at the Arthur Ellis Awards.

== Overview ==
The book is set in Edmonton, Alberta, Canada, and follows several detectives working on a missing persons case and the intersecting lives of Johnny Altinger and aspiring filmmaker Mark Twitchell, who is under investigation for luring strangers to his "kill room," which police believe is designed to replicate elements and methods used by fictional serial killer Dexter Morgan.

== Background ==
Twitchell's arrest and trial attracted substantial media attention since his crimes were inspired by Dexter, the television series. ABC's 20/20, Dateline NBC, CBC's The Fifth Estate, and many newspapers around the world covered the story, from England's The Guardian to Australia's The Age.

Steve Lillebuen had been an Edmonton Journal crime reporter when Twitchell was arrested, leading to a three-year project on writing and researching the book. He also spent a year corresponding with Twitchell after he called the author from prison to volunteer for an interview.

== Notable people ==
- Mark Twitchell: a young businessman and filmmaker who aspires to be the next George Lucas.
- Johnny Altinger: a pipeline worker who loves computers and motorcycles.
- Gilles Tetreault: a new arrival to the city of Edmonton.
- Mark Anstey: the primary investigator in charge of solving the Altinger disappearance.
- Bill Clark: a detective tasked with interrogating major suspects.

== Film adaptation ==
A film adaptation of the book was acquired by David Permut with Sam Hobkinson (Misha and the Wolves) set to direct.
