= Edward Sapiano =

Canadian defence lawyer (d. 2020)

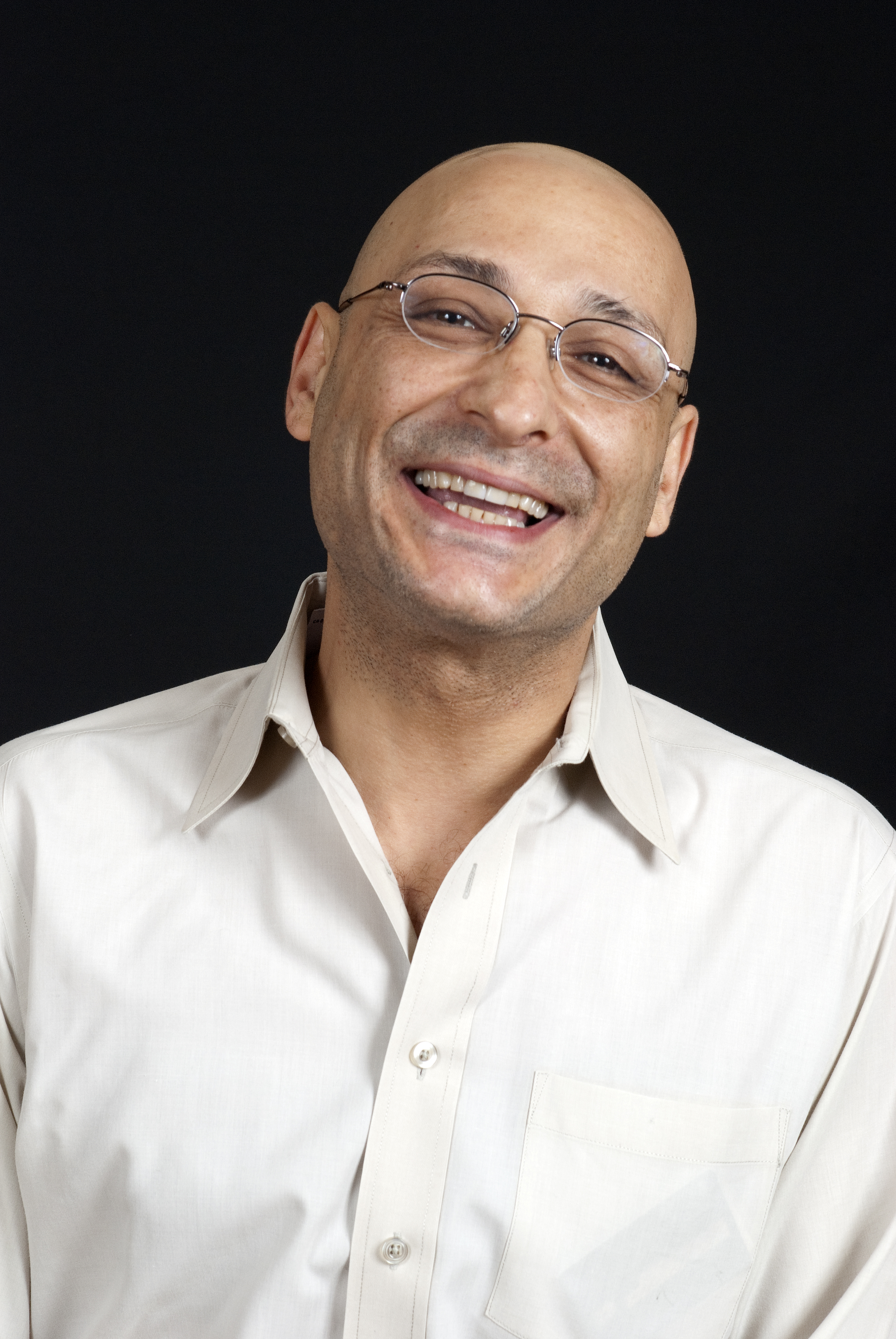
A photo of criminal defence lawyer Edward Sapiano - photo: Phil Brown

Edward Sapiano (died March 21, 2020) was a Canadian defence lawyer, based in Toronto, Ontario, notable for his role in many high-profile criminal cases. He initiated Canada's largest criminal investigation of police, resulting in the arrest and prosecution of several Toronto police officers and was also involved in the so-called Toronto 18 terrorism trial. Edward Sapiano is also noted for demanding immediate DNA testing of his client shortly following the 1996 arrest of the suspected "North York serial rapist", leading to his client Jeremy Foster's full vindication, despite a false confession to the crime. In his quest to get illegal guns off the street, Sapiano also created the only lawyer-operated gun amnesty program available in North America, Piece Options. He is also known for starting a database of rulings and judgements to track alleged misconduct among Toronto-area officers which was then retrievable for cross-examinations in other cases by other lawyers. Edward Sapiano, after putting his practice on hold for two and a half years due to kidney failure, returned to court in 2017 for the Andrea White murder trial. Edward died on March 21, 2020, from complications of kidney disease and was cited to be the first lawyer in Canada to practise while undergoing 10 hours of daily dialysis. He was regularly featured by media outlets, including The Globe and Mail, CBC, and The New York Times commenting on criminal law issues.

== Career ==
Sapiano graduated at the top of his class from the University of Manitoba law school in 1991 and was called to the bar in Ontario in 1993. Sapiano was a board member and director with the Association in Defence of the Wrongly Convicted for a decade until 2004.

In 1999, allegations by Sapiano and eight other Toronto defence lawyers sparked an internal probe into allegations of corruption within the Toronto Police Services, which saw 8 officers charged with stealing money from a fund meant to pay drug informants. Sapiano attested that these officers' actions suggest "a whole separate parallel justice system has been established for police officers". Five officers were ultimately convicted of obstruction of justice and perjury charges by a jury in June 2012. Ultimately, it was Sapiano's database of accusations against Toronto officers that helped prompt the investigation. Sapiano firmly argues that based on his decade of experience in the courtroom, every day in some courtroom in Toronto, some police officer is giving perjured testimony.

In 2004, Sapiano was one of the founding lawyers behind Piece Options, a program that allows people to hand in illegal guns anonymously to the authorities. More than 40 weapons have since been turned over to police in Toronto.

In 2005, Sapiano called for Ontario Superior Court Justice Eugene Ewaschuk to be removed from the trial of accused murderer Richard Brewster alleging that Ewaschuk had a "20 year history" of creating the perception of bias against defendants. Ewaschuk refused to step down but the case ended in a hung jury. The prosecution thereafter stayed all charges.

In 2006, Sapiano defended one of the accused, Yasim Abdi Mohamed, in the so-called Toronto 18 terrorism trial. During the course of the trial, Sapiano publicly criticized the Crown's maneuver of halting the preliminary hearing to proceed with a direct indictment. Sapiano argued that "(The Crown) unilaterally violated" the agreement that the defence lawyers involved in the case would allow certain evidence to be entered uncontested provided the Crown did not proceed with a direct indictment. Sapiano also criticized the treatment of the accused describing their isolated confinement as "appalling" and "inhumane". The charges against Sapiano's client were eventually dropped without any conditions.

In 2009, Sapiano represented Jeremiah Valentine, who pleaded guilty to firing the shot that likely killed 15 year old Jane Creba during the notorious gunfight on Toronto's Yonge Street on December 26, 2005, Boxing Day. Valentine was given a life sentence with a chance for parole after 12 years. Superior Court Justice John McMahon explains that Valentine would have had to wait longer than 12 years for parole eligibility if he hadn't pleaded guilty. Sapiano states that his client "sincerely expressed his remorse and he's given to the Creba family and the people of Toronto the only thing left he has to give, and that is a guilty plea with a life sentence".

In 2010, Sapiano was involved in the Ephraim Brown Murder trial where he represented one of the accused Gregory Sapleton who was charged with the murder of an 11 year old Toronto boy killed in the crossfire of a gang-related shooting. Mr. Sapiano secured the acquittal of his client, resulting in sign-carrying protests in the streets outside the courthouse by members of the public, including the deceased's family. Sapiano acknowledges Justice Brian Trafford who presided over the trial "for properly instructing the jury to not be overwhelmed by gang evidence and keep their eye on the ball — which was identification." Sapiano also criticized the Crown for calling expert evidence relating to Toronto street gangs which he said fostered "a trial of emotions rather than evidence." Insisting his client does not belong to any gangs, he credits the jury explaining that they were able to see "through the smokescreen of so-called gang expert evidence."

In 2013, Sapiano was hired by Tom Samson's family, the bicyclist who was killed in a hit and run accident on his way to meet friends, to force the police to reopen the accident investigation which concluded Mr. Samson caused his own death. Sapiano wrote in a letter to the Toronto Police Service criticizing their investigation that "(a) drug-dealing criminal who is shot and killed during a deal gone bad gets a higher degree of investigative services from the TPS". The initial finding that Tom Samson ran a red light was ultimately reversed.

In 2014, Edward Sapiano represented Eric Carty, accused of conspiring with Jennifer Pan, a notorious young woman who hired a hit squad to kill both her parents. At the time of the Pan killing, Carty was wanted for another, unrelated murder. Due to illness, Sapiano withdrew from the case and a mistrial was declared. Carty has since then pleaded guilty to the charge of conspiring to help murder Pan's parents.

In 2017, after a two and a half year hiatus from his practise as a result of an illness, Edward Sapiano returned to court to defend Michael "Classic" Davani who had been charged with first-degree murder for the murder of Andrea White on April 12, 2014, during a drive-by shooting. He has been cited to be the first lawyer in Canada to practise while undergoing 10 hours of daily dialysis.

== High-profile cases ==
Among Sapiano's high-profile cases include:

- The Toronto Police Drug Squad Scandal which resulted in a landmark police corruption trial resulting in the arrest and prosecution of several officers. Sapiano was instrumental in initiating a complaint requesting an investigation of several named police officers who he accused of conducting ongoing armed robberies of drug dealing suspects in the Greater Toronto area which led to the largest internal police investigation in Canadian policing history.
- The Richard Brewster trial where Sapiano asked Justice Eugene Ewaschuk to remove himself from the trial due to Ewaschuk's alleged record of creating perception of bias against defendants. Justice Ewaschuk refused to step down. The case ended in a hung jury and the charges eventually stayed by the prosecution. Richard Brewster was released a free man.
- The Toronto 18 terrorism trial where terrorism charges against his client Yasim Abdi Mohamed, (who attested his innocence since the day he was charged), were ultimately dropped without conditions, unlike all the other accused, whose sentences ranged from life to "terrorist Peace Bonds" with strict conditions.
- The Boxing Day shooting which resulted in the death of 15 year old Jane Creba. Sapiano represented Jeremiah Valentine who showed remorse for his actions and pleaded guilty to firing the shot which likely killed Creba. Valentine received a life sentence with a chance for parole after 12 years.
- The Ephraim Brown Murder trial where he represented one of the accused Gregory Sappleton who was charged with the gang-related shooting murder of an 11 year old Toronto boy who was caught in the crossfire. Mr. Sapiano secured the acquittal of his client leading to protests in the streets outside of the courtroom.
- The Jennifer Pan trial where Sapiano represented Eric Carty who was accused of conspiring with Jennifer Pan to kill both her parents. Due to illness, Sapiano had to withdraw from the case. Carty has since then pleaded guilty to the charge.

== Death ==
Sapiano died on 21 March 2020 due to kidney disease.
