= Steve Burrows =

Canadian writer

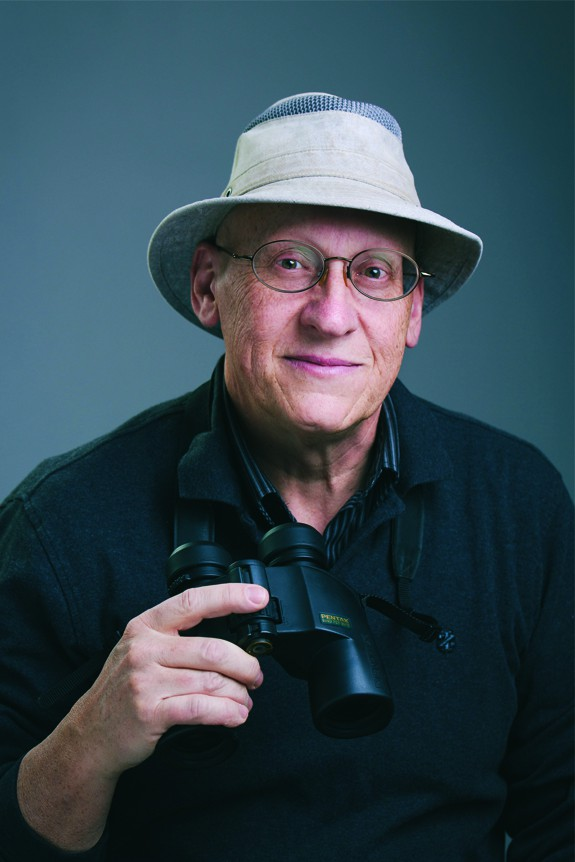
- Burrows at the Eden Mills Writers' Festival in 2016
- Occupations: Mystery novelist; journalist
- Writing career
- Notable awards: Arthur Ellis Award for Best First Novel (2015) for A Siege of Bitterns
- Website: steveburrows.org

Steve Burrows is a Canadian mystery writer, journalist, and past recipient of a Nature Writer of the Year award from BBC Wildlife. His 2014 novel, A Siege of Bitterns, received widespread critical acclaim upon its release and was named one of the top 100 books of 2014 by The Globe and Mail before going on to win the 2015 Arthur Ellis Award for Best First Novel.

== Background ==
Born and raised in the United Kingdom, Burrows moved to Ontario with his family following grammar school. After completing an English degree at York University, Burrows moved to Hong Kong, where he served as editor of the Hong Kong Bird Watching Society Magazine and contributing field editor for Asian Geographic. He currently lives in Oshawa, Ontario.

In 2014, Burrows published his debut novel, A Siege of Bitterns. The novel was well received upon its release, with Joan Barfoot of The London Free Press praising the way it "tucks some ominous environmental alarms and information into its criminal investigations." The Globe and Mail called the novel "a debut of a major new Canadian talent" and named it one of top 100 books of 2014. The novel won the 2015 Arthur Ellis Award for Best First Novel and was shortlisted for the Kobo Emerging Writer Prize.

== Bibliography ==
- A Siege of Bitterns (2014)
- A Pitying of Doves (2015)
- A Cast of Falcons (2016)
- A Shimmer of Hummingbirds (2017)
- A Tiding of Magpies (2018)
- A Dance of Cranes (2018)
- A Foreboding of Petrels (2022)
- A Nye of Pheasants (2024)
- A Murmuration of Starlings (2026)
