= John Lawrence Reynolds =

Canadian author

- Born: November 5, 1939 (age 86); Hamilton, Ontario, Canada
- Education: McMaster University (B.A., 1974)
- Occupation: Writer
- Awards: Arthur Ellis Award; National Business Book Award

John Lawrence Reynolds is a Canadian author. He has published more than 30 fiction and non-fiction books. Three of his novels won the Arthur Ellis Award—The Man Who Murdered God (1990), Gypsy Sins (1994) and Murder Among the Pines (2019). Born in Hamilton, Ontario, he has lived in Burlington for several years.

== Early life and education ==
Reynolds was born in Hamilton, Ontario to John Henry and Mable Irene (née Winegarden) Reynolds. His childhood there has been characterised as "less than idyllic, rife with upheaval and poverty." He went on to graduate from Westdale Secondary School in Hamilton where he co-founded "Terry & The Pirates", an early rock-and-roll band.

== Career ==
In 1960, he joined Russell T. Kelley Advertising as a trainee and eventually became the company's Creative Director and a shareholder. He obtained a degree in English and Psychology from McMaster University via its extension studies programme in 1974, and left the advertising agency that same year to pursue other interests. These included travel and feature writing, photography, film and video writing and directing and radio announcing. In the latter capacity he hosted John's Jazz five nights a week on CING-FM (FM108) from 1976 to 1977 and Saturday Night Jazz on CKDS-FM from 1981 to 1983.

Reynolds published his first novel, The Man Who Murdered God, in 1989. It was to become the first in a series of six crime novels whose central character was Joe McGuire, a Boston policeman. From the mid-1990s he concentrated primarily on non-fiction books. Described in the National Post as one of Canada's most successful ghostwriters, Reynolds also collaborated on several autobiographies by Canadian political and business figures. He returned to crime fiction in 2012 with Beach Strip. Set on Lake Ontario, the novel is narrated in the voice of Josie, the widow of a murdered policeman.

== Personal life ==
Reynolds has been married to Judith Suzanne Reynolds (née Soucie) since 1993. He has two children from his first marriage.

== Books ==
Of his first five mystery novels, four were short-listed for Arthur Ellis Awards as Best Mystery Novel. Two won—The Man Who Murdered God (1990) and Gypsy Sins (1994) His book Murder Among The Pines (2018) won the 2019 Arthur Ellis Award for Best Novella. . In 2016 Orca Publishers issued the first of three novellas set in the Ontario region of Muskoka. The third, Murder Among the Pines (2018), won an Arthur Ellis Award for Best Mystery Novella. He also won a National Business Book Award in 2002 for Free Rider: How a Bay Street Whiz Kid Stole and Spent $20 Million. His 2006 book Shadow People: Inside History's Most Notorious Secret Societies was published in the US as Secret Societies: Their Mysteries Revealed and has been translated into several languages including Spanish (Breve Historia de las Sociedades Secretas), French (Le monde des sociétés secrètes), Polish (Ludzie z cienia), and Turkish (Gizli Örgütler).

Fiction

- The Man Who Murdered God (Viking/Penguin, 1989)
- And Leave Her Lay Dying (Viking Penguin, 1990)
- Whisper Death (Viking Penguin, 1991)
- Gypsy Sins (HarperCollins, 1993)
- Solitary Dancer (Harper Collins, 1994)
- Haunted Hearts (McClelland & Stewart, 2003)
- Beach Strip (HarperCollins, 2012)
- A Murder for Max (Orca Publishing, 2016)
- Murder Below Zero (Orca Publishing, 2017)
- Murder Among the Pines (Orca Publishing, 2018)
- Beach Blonde (At Bay Publishing, 2021)

Non-fiction

- Ballroom Dancing (Key Porter/Arbor Glenn, 1998)
- The Rusty Rake Gardener: Beautiful Canadian Gardens with Minimum Toil by Dave and Cathy Cummins with John Lawrence Reynolds (MacMillan, 1999)
- RRSPs & RRIFs for Dummies – on Registered Retirement Savings Plans and Registered Retirement Income Funds in the For Dummies series (CDG Books, 1999)
- Mad Notions: A True Tale of Murder and Mayhem – on the 1994 murder of a college professor in Sevier County, Tennessee for which the victim's wife and her lover were later convicted (Key Porter, 2000)
- Free Rider: How a Bay Street Whiz Kid Stole and Spent $20 Million – on the convicted Canadian investment fraudster Michael Holoday (McArthur & Company, 2001)
- All In Good Time – autobiography by Brian Tobin with John Lawrence Reynolds (Penguin, 2002)
- Straight From the Top: The Truth About Air Canada – autobiography by Robert Milton with John Lawrence Reynolds (Greystone, 2003)
- The Naked Investor (Penguin, 2005)
- Shadow People: Inside History's Most Notorious Secret Societies (Key Porter, 2006)
- When All You Have Is Hope – autobiography by Frank O'Dea with John Lawrence Reynolds (Penguin, 2007)
- Prognosis – on the Canadian healthcare system (Penguin, 2008)
- One Hell of a Ride – biography of Canadian industrialist Craig Dobbin (Douglas & McIntyre, 2008)
- Laying It On The Line – by Buzz Hargrove with John Lawrence Reynolds (HarperCollins, 2009)
- Bubbles, Bankers & Bailouts – on the 2008 financial crisis (Douglas & McIntyre, 2009)
- The Skeptical Investor (Penguin, 2010)
- Driven: How to Succeed in Business and Life – by Robert Herjavec with John Lawrence Reynolds (HarperCollins, 2010)
- Sun Rise: Suncor, the Oil Sands and the Future of Energy – by Rick George, former CEO of Suncor Energy, with John Lawrence Reynolds (HarperCollins, 2012)
- Do the Next Right Thing: Surviving Life's Crises – by Frank O'Dea with John Lawrence Reynolds (Penguin, 2013)
- "Leaving Home - The Remarkable Life of Petter Jacyk (Figure 1 Publishing, 2013)
- "The Will To Win - Leading, Competing, Succeeding" - by Robert Herjavec with John Lawrence Reynolds (HarperCollins, 2013)
- "You Don't Have To Be a Shark" - by Robert Herjavec with John Lawrence Reynolds (St. Martin's Press, 2016)
- "The Dividends of Decency - How Values-Based Leadership Will Help Business Flourish in Trump's America" - By Donald Sheppard with John Lawrence Reynolds (Figure 1 Publishing, 2018)
