= Scott Mackay =

Canadian mystery and science fiction author

Scott Mackay is a Canadian mystery and science fiction author from Toronto, Ontario, where he still lives with his wife and two children. He is the author of eleven novels and over forty short stories. His short story "Last Inning" won the 1999 Arthur Ellis Award for best short mystery fiction. Another story, Reasons Unknown, won the Okanagan Award for Best Literary Short Fiction in early 1999. His first Barry Gilbert mystery, Cold Comfort, was nominated for the Arthur Ellis Award for best mystery novel, and his science fiction novel, The Meek, was a finalist for the prestigious U.S. John Campbell Memorial Award of 2001. His novels have been published in six languages.

== Awards ==
- Okanagan Award for Best Literary Short Fiction in 1999 for Reasons Unknown
- Arthur Ellis Award in 1999 for "Last Inning"

== Bibliography ==
=== SF Novels ===
- Outpost (1998)
- The Meek (2001)
- Orbis (2002)
- Omnifix (2004)
- Tides (2005)
- Phytosphere (2007)
- Omega Sol (2008)

=== Mystery Novels ===
- A Friend in Barcelona (1991) - spy thriller
- Barry Gilbert series
  - Cold Comfort (1998)
  - Fall Guy (2001)
  - Old Scores (2003)
- Dr. Clyde Deacon series (historical mystery)
  - The Angel of the Glade (2009)
  - The Miser of Cherry Hill (2011)

=== Short fiction ===
- "Iserman's Override" (1991)
- "The Sages of Cassiopeia" (1994)
- "The Wave" (1995)
- "Reasons Unknown" (1997) - in Northern Frights 4 (2006), edited by Don Hutchison
- "Like a Shadow, Like a Dream" (1997)
- "We" (1998)
- "Final Improvement" (1999)
- "The Blessing" (1999)
- "Last Inning" (1999)
- "Threshold of Perception" (2005) - in Tesseracts 10 (2006), edited by Robert Charles Wilson and Edo van Belkom
- "The Girl with the Golden Hair" (2011) - a Dr. Clyde Deacon mystery, in Ellery Queen Mystery Magazine #844 (December, 2011)

=== Nonfiction ===
- "Get in the Go Zone: Making the Most of Me", with Mark McKeon, Derek Percival, and Shane Garner

=== Other ===
- "Night City Stories: Charting New Realms of Imagination " (1992) - gaming campaign text, referee maps, etc.
