= Bob the Angry Flower =

Webcomic (1992-current)

- Author: Stephen Notley
- Website: http://www.angryflower.com/
- Current status/schedule: Weekly
- Launch date: 1992
- Genre: Comedy

Bob the Angry Flower is a webcomic by Stephen Notley, published weekly starting in 1992. It tells the exploits of an easily angered anthropomorphic flower named Bob and his interactions with the world, often in search of either global domination or love. Though the comic strip features a range of recurring characters, most strips stand alone with little or no continuity

== Characters and style ==
Bob has an intense hatred of the incorrect use of the apostrophe to form plurals, and is also often found in outlandish but self-inflicted predicaments. The strips themselves range from absurdist humor to dadaist "anti-humor".

Bob's two sidekicks are "Stumpy" (a talking tree stump) and "Freddie the Flying Fetus". While Stumpy's appearance and demeanour epitomise existential ennui, Freddie – as befits his tender years – is a vital and innocent spirit, insuppressibly enthusiastic and trusting; the pair provide two different counterpoints to the single-minded irascibility of the protagonist. Other recurring minor characters include robots (and their natural enemies, bears), ninjas, Daleks (from Doctor Who) and various evil masterminds. Dick Cheney, Kofi Annan, and other world leaders have also appeared as characters on occasion.

== Background ==
Bob the Angry Flower is the creation of Canadian cartoonist Stephen Notley, a native of Edmonton, who has been based in Seattle since early 2005. The cartoon has been carried, at different times, by several local newspapers and magazines including See magazine, Vue Weekly, the Edmonton Journal, and The Gateway. Notley also generally posts new strips to his website every Friday.

Bob the Angry Flower has had one spin-off series, Lovebot Conquers All, featuring Lovebot, a robot built by Bob and then abandoned, and who reappears occasionally in the strip to bring readers up to date on his fruitless quest for love. It appeared in black and white as a bonus feature in the collection Bob the Angry Flower: The Ultimate Book of Perfect Energy, and ran in color on the subscription site Graphic Smash.

There are currently fourteen books published, mostly consisting of compiled cartoons from the weekly series, with a few extra features. They are:

- In Defence of Fascism (1997) (ISBN 978-0968217504)
- Coffee with Sinistar (1999) (ISBN 978-0968217511)
- Everybody vs. Bob the Angry Flower (2001) (ISBN 978-0968217528)
- Bob the Angry Flower: The Ultimate Book of Perfect Energy!!! (2003) (ISBN 978-0968217535)
- Dog Killer (2005) (ISBN 978-1892391346)
- Pamplemousse (2008) (ISBN 978-0-9817241-0-2)
- Rothgar (2010) (ISBN 978-0-9817241-1-9)
- How to Operate a Chair (2012) (ISBN 978-0-9817241-2-6)
- The Unthinkable (2015) (ISBN 978-0-9817241-3-3)
- X (2017) (ISBN 978-0-981724140)
- exciting space adventure (2019) (ISBN 978-0981724157)
- An Excellent Use of One's Time (2021) (ISBN 978-0981724164)
- Different Dooms (2023) (ISBN 979-8393152239)
- The Machines (2025) (ISBN 979-8283729039)

Notley is the son of politician Grant Notley, a former leader of the Alberta New Democratic Party, and the brother of Rachel Notley, the former leader of the Alberta New Democratic Party and former Premier of Alberta.

== Reception ==
Bob the Angry Flower was referenced by science fiction writer Michael Swanwick in a September 2002 short story about an encounter with Notley. Swanwick writes, "Bob the Angry Flower experiences all emotions at exaggerated levels. He builds giant killer robots, he deploys world-destroying lasers. He's sort of like your id with an unlimited budget. The cartoons involve irrational and surreal menaces that are resolved, usually, through abrupt changes of mood and subject."

== Licensing ==
Notley has released his Bob the Angry Flower work under an original license. The license only enables sale of T-shirts with Bob the Angry Flower material from CafePress stores, and also requires that the image is sent to Notley, and by implication the link of the relevant CafePress store. In 2006, Bob the Angry Flower was released as a collection by Tachyon Publications.
