= Rosemary Aubert =

Canadian-American author and poet (1946–2024)

- Born: 4 May 1946; Niagara Falls, New York
- Died: 13 March 2024 (aged 77); Toronto
- Education: B.A. St. Bonaventure University; M.A. York University; Certificate in Criminology University of Toronto
- Occupations: Novelist, poet, writing teacher
- Spouse: Douglas Purdon
- Writing career
- Pen name: Lucy Snow
- Language: English
- Notable works: The Ellis Portal mystery series; Terminal Grill
- Notable awards: Arthur Ellis Award 1994 Short Fiction. Arthur Ellis Award 1999 Best Mystery Novel

Rosemary Aubert (4 May 1946 – 13 March 2024) was a Canadian-American author, poet, and critic, most known for her Ellis Portal series of crime novels. In 1995 she won an Arthur Ellis Award (since renamed to the Crime Writers of Canada Awards of Excellence) for Best Crime Short Story for "The Midnight Boat to Palermo." In 1999 she won the Best Novel award for The Feast of Stephen.

Aubert was born in Niagara Falls, New York, but lived in Canada for over 40 years. She resided in Toronto, where she taught novel writing. Over the course of her life she also worked as an editor, bailiff, security consultant for the United States consulate in Toronto, and as a court services officer at the Ontario Superior Court of Justice.

== Bibliography ==
=== Poetry ===
- Aubert, Rosemary (1974). An Even Dozen Poems. Toronto: Missing Link Press.
- ——— (1977). Two Kinds of Honey. Ottawa: Oberon Press.
- ——— (1986). "Autobiography". Canadian Woman Studies. 7 (3).
- ——— (1997). Picking Wild Raspberries: The Imaginary Love Poems of Gertrude Stein. Sono Nis Press.
- ——— (2011). Rough Wilderness: The Imaginary Love Poems of the Abbess Heloise. Fourfront Editions.
- ——— (2012). Lenin for Lovers. [self-published].
- ——— (Summer 2016). "What the Shadows Say". Queen's Quarterly. 123 (2): 296–297.
- ——— (2018). Strong, Certain and Alone: Poems in the Voice of Isaac Newton. Carrick Publishing.

=== Nonfiction ===
- Webster, Jack; Aubert, Rosemary (1991). Copper Jack: My Life on the Force. Toronto: Dundurn. ISBN 1550021486. (This is a memoir of detective Jack Webster.)

=== Fiction ===
Aubert's first books were written under the pseudonym Lucy Snow (a name drawn from Villette by Charlotte Brontë). In 2000 she wrote, "I am a writer of mysteries and romances, in short, of 'genre' fiction."

- Snow, Lucy (1983). Song of Eden. Worldwide.
- ——— (1984). A Red Bird in Winter. Toronto: Harlequin.
- ——— (1985). Garden of Lions. Toronto: Harlequin.
- Aubert, Rosemary (1985). Firebrand. Toronto: Harlequin.
- ——— (1997). Free Reign. Bridgehampton, NY: Brige Works.
- ——— (1999). The Feast of Stephen. Bridgehampton, NY: Bridge Works.
- ——— (2001). The Ferryman Will be There. Bridgehampton, NY: Bridge Works.
- ——— (2001). Leave Me By Dying. Toronto: McArthur.
- ——— (2005). The Red Mass. Toronto: McArthur.
- ——— (2007). Judge of Orphans. Toronto: iUniverse.
- ——— (2013). Terminal Grill. Toronto: Quattro.
- ——— (2014). Don't Forget You Love Me. Toronto.
- ——— (2016). The Midnight Boat to Palermo and Other Stories. Toronto: Carrick Publishing.

The early novel Firebrand is a Harlequin romance set in Toronto, about a municipal affairs librarian and her relationship with the mayor.

The Ellis Portal series consists of Free Reign, The Feast of Stephen, The Ferryman Will Be There, Leave Me By Dying, Red Mass and Don't Forget You Love Me.
