= Frances Greenslade =

Canadian writer (born 1961)

Frances Greenslade (born 1961 in St. Catharines, Ontario) is a Canadian writer. She grew up with four sisters and one brother playing among the orchards of the Niagara Peninsula. The family moved to Winnipeg, Manitoba, when she was ten. Greenslade earned a degree in English at the University of Winnipeg before moving to Vancouver, British Columbia, where she completed her MFA in Creative Writing at the University of British Columbia in 1992. In 2005 Frances and her family moved to Penticton, in the southern Okanagan, where her love of British Columbia's landscape flourished and was a source of inspiration in writing Shelter, her first novel. Greenslade now lives in Penticton, British Columbia, where she teaches English Literature at Okanagan College.

== Writing ==
Shelter (Random House Canada 2012) is Greenslade's first novel and was published as part of Knopf and Random House Canada's renowned New Face of Fiction program. Greenslade says of the book during an interview with the Winnipeg Free Press, "Shelter looks at the expectations we have of our mothers, our first shelter, and the shock that comes when we realize they are more than just our mothers, but women with lives that don't always include us." The National Post called it, "a slow, quiet, addictive read. Once you get caught, you find yourself caring about these characters, wanting to know what they will do next, how they will survive" and the Toronto Star said, "Shelter is a beating heart of a book, alive with Greenslade's fierce imagination, her acute descriptions of the natural world, her sure hand with narrative." Shelter was shortlisted for the Ontario Library Association's 2012 Evergreen Awards and was named one of the best books of 2012 by the United Kingdom book chain, Waterstones.

Greenslade is also the author of two non-fiction books, By the Secret Ladder: A Mother's Initiation (Penguin 2007) and A Pilgrim in Ireland: A Quest for Home (Penguin, 2002). A Pilgrim in Ireland: A Quest for Home was awarded the 2003 Saskatchewan Book Award for non-fiction. Quill & Quire reviewed it as "Rich with research and anecdote, the book functions as a primer to Irish lore, the peculiarities of Irish Catholicism, and to Irish history."

Greenslade's work has also appeared in GRAIN, NeWest Review, and Room.
