= James Powell (author) =

Canadian author

James Powell (born 1932) is a Canadian author of mystery and humorous short stories. Many of his 130 stories have been published in Ellery Queen's Mystery Magazine. He has been nominated twice for the Crime Writers of Canada Award for the Best Short Story and, in 1989, won the Ellery Queen Readers' Award for the story "A Dirge for Clowntown" featuring Inspector Bozo of the Clowntown Police. Powell's occasionally dark sense of humor and developed irony has led to him being noted by Marvin Lachman as "The S.J. Perelman of the mystery story...outrageous, hilarious satires, international crime and surprise endings."

Powell's most loved characters include Acting Sergeant Maynard Bullock of the RCMP and the four generation family of San Sebastiano detectives, The Ganelons. The author was born in Toronto, attended the University of Toronto and taught and studied in France for three years. He has worked on publications in New York City as well as in Rock Island, Illinois. A collection of his stories has recently been published in Japan. He has resided in Marietta, Pennsylvania for many years with his wife, Mary Lou and their poodles Daphne and Daffodil.

== Works ==
Powell has published two short story collections:

- A Murder Coming (Yonge & Bloor, 1990)
- A Pocketful of Noses; Stories of One Ganelon or Another (Crippen & Landru, 2009)

== Awards ==
- 2003: Arthur Ellis award for best short story of the year, "Bottom Walker"
- 2006: Grant Allen Award, Scene of the Crime Festival
