= Steve Lillebuen =

Canadian author and journalist

- Born: Edmonton, Alberta, Canada
- Occupation: Journalist
- Writing career
- Period: 2000s–present
- Subjects: True crime, news
- Notable work: The Devil's Cinema
- Website: stevelillebuen.com

Steve Lillebuen is a Canadian author and journalist. He divides his time between Australia and Canada.

== Background ==
Born in Edmonton, Alberta, Lillebuen graduated from the University of Alberta with a Bachelor of Arts degree and later attended Monash University, where he completed a PhD in journalism. At the University of Alberta, he served as an editor and writer for The Gateway, the campus newspaper.

In 2004, Lillebuen founded the Gateway Alumni Association (GAA), an official chapter of the University of Alberta's alumni association, and served as its first president.

As of 2019, Lillebuen teaches investigative journalism at MacEwan University in Edmonton, Alberta.

== Career in journalism ==
Lillebuen has been widely published across Canada and Australia, and has worked as a journalist at newswire agencies The Canadian Press and Australian Associated Press.

He also worked at the Edmonton Journal as a police reporter. While at the newspaper, he covered homicides and major crimes across Alberta and northern British Columbia, including the case of Mark Twitchell. The criminal investigation and first-degree murder trial drew substantial media attention due to its connections to Dexter Morgan, a fictional serial killer and bloodstain pattern analyst featured in the Dexter television program and series of books.

The Mark Twitchell case and trial became the focus of The Devil's Cinema, Lillebuen's first book, after he left the newspaper.

The book won the Arthur Ellis Award for Best Non-Fiction. It was also shortlisted in Australia for the Ned Kelly Award.

A film adaptation of the book was acquired by David Permut with Sam Hobkinson set to direct in April 2022.

== Bibliography ==
- Steve Lillebuen. The Devil's Cinema: The Untold Story Behind Mark Twitchell's Kill Room (2012). McClelland & Stewart. ISBN 978-0-7710-5033-6
