= Eric Wright (writer) =

Canadian writer

- Born: May 4, 1929; Kennington London, England
- Died: October 9, 2015 (aged 86); Canada
- Education: University of Manitoba (BA); University of Toronto (MA)
- Occupations: Novelist, writer
- Writing career
- Language: English
- Genre: Mystery

Eric Wright (May 4, 1929 – October 9, 2015) was a Canadian writer of mystery novels.

== Life ==
Wright was born on Kennington Park Road, in South London, England. He was the son of seamstress Caroline (Curnow), and carter Joseph Wright. Wright was born into a large, poor family of ten children. After growing up in Lambeth, he immigrated to Canada in 1951.

Wright attended the University of Manitoba, completing his B.A. in 1957, and received his M.A. in 1963 from the University of Toronto. Until his retirement Wright taught English at Ryerson Polytechnic University, Toronto (1958–89). Wright most recently lived in Toronto, Ontario with his wife and two daughters.

Eric Wright was the author of four mystery/detective series—the Inspector Charlie Salter Mysteries, the Lucy Trimble Brenner Mysteries, the Mel Pickett Mysteries, and the Joe Barley Mysteries—as well as a memoir Always Give a Penny to a Blind Man which covers most of Wright's life from when he was a child growing up poor in working-class London through his immigration to Canada and the beginning of his university attendance. It is said that his "early life experiences contributed to his...gift for fiction". Over the years Wright has built up an international reputation among mystery lovers. Wright also wrote two stand-alone novels, Moodie's Tale and Finding Home, the novella "Dempsey's Lodge", and a short story, "Twins".

Wright is best known for his series of police procedurals featuring Metropolitan Toronto police inspector Charlie Salter. The Charlie Salter Mysteries are "noteworthy for Wright's lucid and agreeably laconic style". The first Charlie Salter book, The Night the Gods Smiled, won the Arthur Ellis Award, the John Creasey Award, and the Toronto Book Award.

Wright's books won numerous other awards over the years. Four of his novels were awarded the Arthur Ellis Award for Best Crime Novel. Among them, The Night the Gods Smiled also received the 1984 Toronto Book Award, and Britain's John Creasy Memorial Award for best crime drama. The Inspector Charlie Salter Mysteries Smoke Detector and Death in the Old Country and the Joe Barley Mystery The Kidnapping of Rosie Dawn also received the Arthur Ellis Award. In 1998, Wright received the Derrick Murdoch Award for lifetime contributions to Canadian crime writing. The Kidnapping of Rosie Dawn went on to be nominated for an Edgar Award.

In a book review of Wright's novel Moodie's Tale, Wright was described as having "created a protagonist who can conduct the reader through the convoluted maze of academic life". Moodie's Tale (1994) follows the adventurous career of a young Cambridge graduate with an M.A. from Simcoe University. It has been said that "it would not be all that surprising… if Moodie's Tale became an underground handbook for anyone contemplating—or currently enmeshed in – an academic career". On October 9, 2015, Wright died of kidney cancer at the age of 86.

In the fall of 2015 Wright was notified that he had been selected for the Crime Writers of Canada Grand Master Award. This was awarded posthumously in May 2016.

== Bibliography ==
=== Charlie Salter Mysteries ===
- The Night the Gods Smiled (1984)
- Smoke Detector (1984)
- Death in the Old Country (1985)
- The Man Who Changed His Name, also published as A Single Death (1986)
- A Body Surrounded by Water (1987)
- A Question of Murder (1988)
- A Sensitive Case (1990)
- Final Cut (1991)
- A Fine Italian Hand (1991)
- Death by Degrees (1993)
- The Last Hand (2001)
- My Brother's Keeper (2001) with Howard Engel (Benny Cooperman)

=== Lucy Trimble Brenner Mysteries ===
- Death of a Sunday Writer (1996) Dundurn Press
- Death on the Rocks (1999) Dundurn Press

=== Mel Pickett Mysteries ===
- Buried in Stone (1996)
- Death of A Hired Man (2001)

=== Joe Barley Mysteries ===
- The Kidnapping of Rosie Dawn (2000)
- The Hemingway Caper (2003) Dundurn Press
- A Likely Story (2010)

=== Memoirs ===
- Always Give a Penny to a Blind Man (1999)

=== Fiction ===
- The Land Mine (Cormorant Books)

=== Other ===
- A Killing Climate, Collected Short Mysteries (Crippen & Landru, 2003)
- Moodie's Tale (1994)
- Twins (2001)
- Finding Home (2007)
- Dempsey's Lodge (2013)
