= A Daughter's Deadly Deception =

Book by Jeremy Grimaldi

- Author: Jeremy Grimaldi
- Language: English
- Subject: Crime, psychology, history
- Genre: Non-fiction
- Publisher: Dundurn Press
- Publication date: 2016
- Publication place: Canada
- Pages: 336

A Daughter's Deadly Deception: The Jennifer Pan Story is a 2016 book written by Jeremy Grimaldi and published by Dundurn Press, discussing the crimes of Jennifer Pan, in which she conspired in the killing of her mother and the attempted murder of her father. The author served as a journalist covering criminal issues in the York Region for the Metroland Media network of publications.

== Background and contents ==
Grimaldi attended court proceedings for the Pan case in a period of ten months. His research included court documents, police records, photographs, text messages, transcripts, and videos, as well as interviews of psychologists.

The first part of the book chronicles the investigation into the incident, while Pan's childhood is discussed in a subsequent chapter. Joyce Lau of the South China Morning Post stated "Some of Grimaldi's best writing comes in his description of the police questioning of Pan."

Grimaldi is a White Canadian. He discusses the books Battle Hymn of the Tiger Mother and Why Chinese Parents Don't Say I Love You in regards to the cultural backgrounds of Asian Canadian parents and why they put pressure on their children to succeed.

== Reception ==
The director of sales and marketing at Dundurn, Margaret Bryant, stated that A Daughter's Deadly Deception had many e-book sales to places outside of Canada.

Lau gave the book four of five stars. She concluded that it "might not be Truman Capote’s In Cold Blood, but this thorough exploration of what leads seemingly decent people to horrific actions is no tawdry crime paperback, either."

The book won the 2017 Arthur Ellis non-fiction award.
