= University of Calgary Press =

Canadian university press

- Parent company: University of Calgary
- Founded: 1981
- Country of origin: Canada
- Headquarters location: Calgary, Alberta
- Distribution: Georgetown Terminal Warehouses (Canada); Longleaf Services (US); Gazelle Book Services (Europe, Africa, Asia)
- Publication types: Books
- Official website: press.ucalgary.ca

The University of Calgary Press is a university publishing house that is a wholly owned subsidiary of the University of Calgary. Located in Calgary, Alberta, it publishes peer-reviewed scholarly books that connect local experiences to global communities. It became an Open Access press on October 22, 2010.

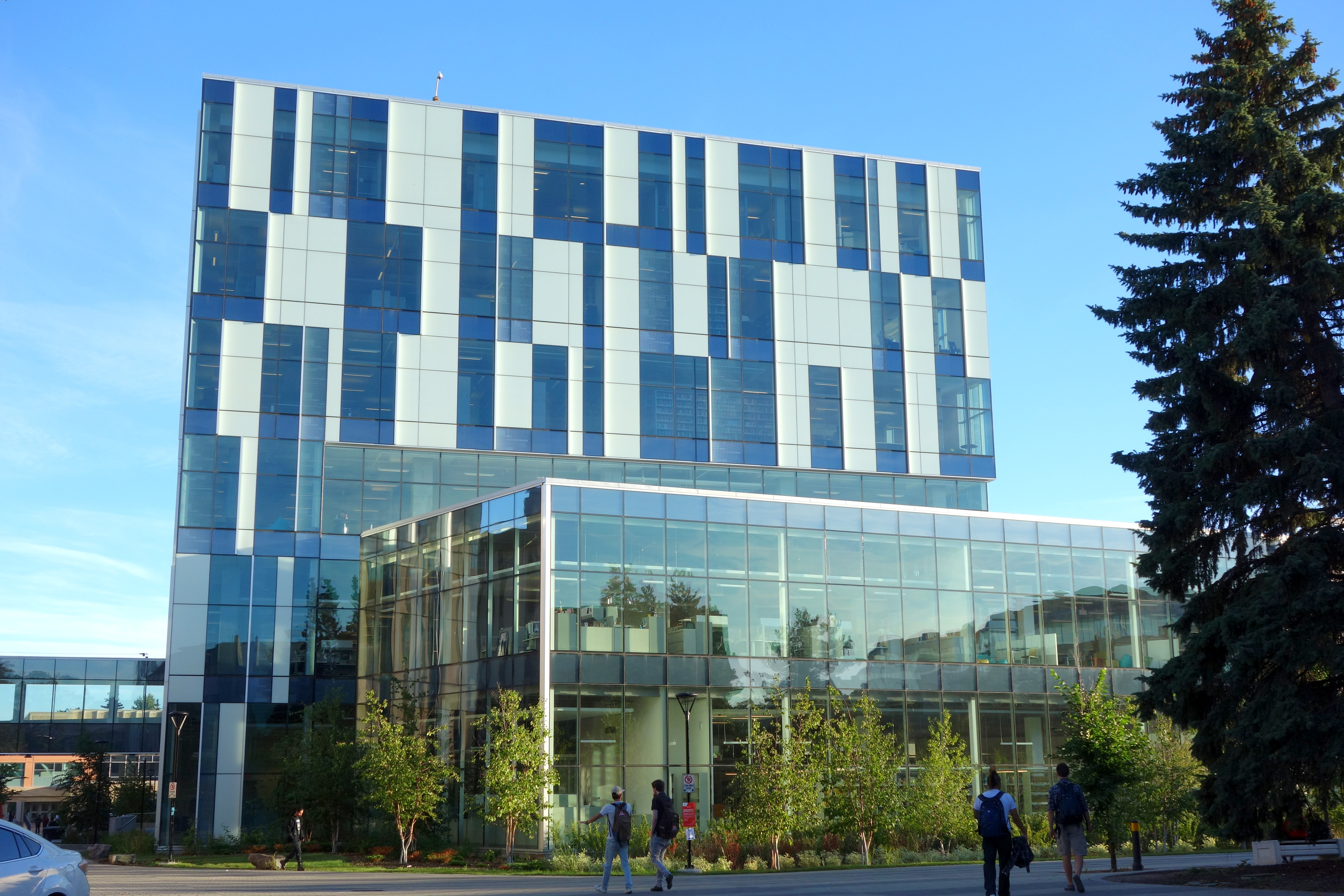
The Taylor Family Digital Library, in which the Press is housed

== Affiliations ==
The University of Calgary Press is part of the Centre for Scholarly Communication of the University of Calgary's Libraries and Cultural Resources. It also co-publishes Arctic with the Arctic Institute of North America.

The press is currently a member of the Association of University Presses.

== Publications ==
The publishing specialties of the University of Calgary Press are: African Studies; Arctic and Northern Studies; Contemporary Canadian Art and Architecture; Energy, Ecology and Sustainability; Film Studies; Latin American and Caribbean Studies; Military and Strategic Studies; and The West.

The Press currently has nine series, including:

- Africa: Missing Voices
- Art in Profile: Canadian Art and Architecture
- Beyond Boundaries: Canadian Defence and Strategic Studies
- Canadian History and Environment
- Latin American & Caribbean Studies
- Northern Lights
- The West

== History ==
On October 22, 2010, as part of "Open Access Week", the University of Calgary Press released its first open access book, Grey Matters, a Guide for Collaborative Research. Since then, the Press has continued to release titles as open access, and as of March 2016 offers 71 titles under a Creative Commons License.
