= Crime Writers of Canada =

Crime Writers of Canada (CWC) is a national, non-profit organization that promotes crime writing in Canada and aims to raise the profile of the genre's established and aspiring authors. It was founded in 1982 by mystery reviewers Derrick Murdock and Doug Marshall, editor John Pierce and mystery and thriller authors Tony Aspler, Howard Engel, Tim Heald, and Larry Morse.

Crime writing, as defined by the CWC, is any fictional or factual book-length work, novella or short-story that features crime as a major or principal element, and is written for any print or electronic medium. The genre includes any written account of criminal activity, crime detection and/or crime solving, set in any historical or geographical context, and usually involves a strong element of suspense. Crime Fiction may include detective stories, mysteries, thrillers, tales of espionage and suspense, as well courtroom, police or forensic procedural dramas. Other genres such as romance or speculative fiction may also involve a strong criminal or crime-detection theme.

Among the CWC members are professional and emerging authors, publicists and literary critics, author representatives, librarians, book sellers, and fans of crime fiction.

== Annual Awards ==
Originally known as the Arthur Ellis Awards, the Awards of Excellence have acknowledged distinction in Canadian crime writing since 1984. Celebrating the best in Canadian crime fiction with a juried annual competition, they draw readers’ and critics’ attention and the Unpublished category has launched several careers. Judges are drawn from a pool of award-winning writers, reviewers, booksellers, librarians, and academics across Canada. Finalists, as well as winners, recognize their exceptional promotional value.

== See also ==
- CrimeFictionCanada
