= Inspector Banks series =

Mystery book series by Peter Robinson

The Inspector Banks series is a collection of mystery novels by Peter Robinson about Detective Superintendent Alan Banks.

The series is set in the fictional English town of Eastvale in the Yorkshire Dales. Robinson has stated that Eastvale is modelled on Ripon and Richmond and is somewhere north of Ripon, close to the A1 road [sic].

A former member of the London Metropolitan Police, Inspector Alan Banks leaves the capital for a quieter life in the Dales. He resides in Gratly, specifically inspired by the real villages of Hawes and Gayle, in Wensleydale, North Yorkshire.

Since 2010, several of the novels have been adapted for television under the series title DCI Banks.

== Selected texts ==
=== Gallows View (1987) ===
Gallows View, the first novel in the series, was first published in 1987.

The novel follows Detective Chief Inspector Alan Banks, a perceptive, curious and compassionate policeman recently moved to the Yorkshire Dales from London to escape the stress of city life. His first cases involve a Peeping Tom frightening the women of Eastvale; two glue-sniffing young thugs breaking into homes and robbing people; and an old woman who may or may not have been murdered. In addition to all this, Banks has to deal with the local feminists and his attraction to a young psychologist, Jenny Fuller. As the tension mounts, both Jenny and Banks's wife, Sandra, are drawn deeper into the events. The cases weave together as the story reaches a tense and surprising climax.

=== Past Reason Hated (1991) ===
Past Reason Hated, the fifth novel in the series, was published in 1991.

The novel follows the case to solve the murder of Caroline Hartly, whose body of is found one evening before Christmas by her lover, Veronica Shildon. It is a cosy scene–log fire, sheepskin rug, Vivaldi on the stereo, Christmas lights and tree–but Caroline is naked and covered in blood. Detective Constable Susan Gay is the first detective at the scene. She has recently been promoted to C.I.D. and the case soon takes on overwhelming professional and personal importance for her. DC Gay and Chief Inspector Alan Banks soon find plenty of suspects as they begin to delve into Caroline's past and the women's present life: Veronica's ex-husband, who is a well-known composer; a feminist poet; the cast and crew of a play Caroline was rehearsing; and Caroline's eccentric, reclusive brother, Gary Hartley. Inspector Banks's fifth case is an ironic, suspenseful tale of family secrets, hidden passions and desperate violence.

Past Reason Hated won the 1992 Arthur Ellis Award for Best Novel.

=== Innocent Graves (1996) ===
Innocent Graves, the eighth novel in the series, was first printed in 1996.

The novel was selected by Publishers Weekly as one of the best mysteries of the year, nominated for the 1996 Hammett Prize, and won the 1997 Arthur Ellis Award for 'Best Novel'.

=== In a Dry Season (1999) ===
In a Dry Season, the tenth novel in the series, was published in 1999.

The novel is widely acclaimed as Robinson's best, a large step forward in ambition from previous books, and this was reflected in its critical and commercial response. The novel was nominated for the 1999 Hammett Prize, was shortlisted for the American Edgar Award, and won the 2000 Anthony and Barry Awards for Best Novel.

=== Cold is the Grave (2000) ===
Cold Is the Grave, the 11th novel in the series, was published in 2000.

An episode of the British television series DCI Banks is based on the novel's plot.

Cold is the Grave won the 2001 Arthur Ellis Award for Best Crime Novel and the 2006 Danish Palle Rosenkrantz Award.

=== Aftermath (2001) ===
Aftermath, the 12th novel in the series, was published in 2001.

The novel follows Inspector Banks following a routine call to the police yields unbelievable horror. In the cellar of 35 The Hill, two people are dead, a third is dying, and behind a door more bodies are laid out. This seems to be the end of a grisly case Banks has been working on for some time, but it turns out to be only the beginning. It is apparent who the murderer is, but Banks quickly finds out that nothing in this case is quite as straightforward as it seems. Many people are entangled in this crime – some whose lives are shattered by it, and some with unspeakable secrets in their pasts. The dead, Banks learns, are not the only victims, and the murderer may not be the only person to blame.

Aftermath became the basis of the pilot episode of the British television series DCI Banks which first aired in the United Kingdom in 2010.

=== The Summer that Never Was (2003) ===
The Summer That Never Was, the 13th novel in the series, was originally published in 2003 in the United Kingdom. The book was retitled as Close to Home in the United States.

The novel was nominated for the 2004 Anthony Award for Best Novel.

=== Piece of My Heart (2006) ===
Piece of My Heart, the 16th novel in the series, was published in 2006.

The story was filmed as part of the DCI Banks series and first aired in the United Kingdom in 2 parts on February 17 and 24, 2014. The teleplay varies considerably from storyline presented in the novel and includes a different timeframe (i.e., the murder takes place in 1988). The name of the band is changed to The Crystal Kiss.

=== Watching the Dark (2012) ===
Watching the Dark, is the 20th novel in the series, was published in August 2012.

The novel follows Inspector Banks as he investigates the murder of Officer DI Bill Quinn, who has been shot through the heart by a bolt from a crossbow while convalescing at the St. Peter's Police Treatment Centre. The initial investigation uncovers compromising photos with a very young woman in his room. Assigned to assist DCI Banks is Professional Standards Inspector Joanna Passero, and as the investigation progresses, they uncover a link with a cold case that takes them to Tallinn, Estonia to unearth the truth.

== Awards and honours ==
Awards and honours for the Inspector Banks series
Year	Title	Award	Result	Ref.
1988	Gallows View	Arthur Ellis Award for Best Crime Novel	Finalist	
1989	A Dedicated Man	Arthur Ellis Award for Best Crime Novel	Finalist	
1990	The Hanging Valley	Arthur Ellis Award for Best Crime Novel	Finalist	
1992	Past Reason Hated	Arthur Ellis Award for Best Novel	Winner	
1993	Wednesday's Child	Arthur Ellis Award for Best Crime Novel	Finalist	
1995	Wednesday's Child	Edgar Award for Best Novel	Finalist	
1995	Final Account (Dry Bones That Dream)	Author's Award, Foundation for the Advancement of Canadian Letters		
1996	Innocent Graves	Hammett Prize	Nominee	
1997	Innocent Graves	Arthur Ellis Award for Best Novel	Winner	
1998	Dead Right (Blood at the Root)	Arthur Ellis Award for Best Crime Novel	Finalist	
1999	In a Dry Season	Hammett Prize	Nominee	
2000	In a Dry Season	Anthony Award for Best Novel	Winner	
2000	In a Dry Season	Arthur Ellis Award for Best Crime Novel	Finalist	
2000	In a Dry Season	Barry Award for Best Novel	Winner	
2000	In a Dry Season	Edgar Award for Best Novel	Finalist	
2000	In a Dry Season	Macavity Award for Best Mystery Novel	Finalist	
2001	Cold is the Grave	Arthur Ellis Award for Best Crime Novel	Winner	
2001	In a Dry Season	Le Grand Prix de Littérature Policière		
2001	In a Dry Season	Martin Beck Award	Winner	
2002	Aftermath	Arthur Ellis Award for Best Crime Novel	Finalist	
2002	The Hanging Valley	Spoken Word Bronze Award		
2004	Playing with Fire	Hammett Prize	Nominee	
2004	The Summer That Never Was (Close To Home)	Anthony Award for Best Novel	Nominee	
2004	The Summer That Never Was (Close To Home)	Arthur Ellis Award for Best Crime Novel	Finalist	
2005	Playing with Fire	Arthur Ellis Award for Best Crime Novel	Finalist	
2005	Playing with Fire	Macavity Award for Best Mystery Novel	Finalist	
2006	Cold is the Grave	Palle Rosenkrantz Award	Winner	
2006	Strange Affair	Arthur Ellis Award for Best Crime Novel	Finalist	
2006	Strange Affair	Macavity Award for Best Mystery Novel	Finalist	
2007	Piece of My Heart	Arthur Ellis Award for Best Crime Novel	Finalist	
2007	Piece of My Heart	Macavity Award for Best Mystery Novel	Finalist	
2008	Piece of My Heart	Theakstons Old Peculier Crime Novel of the Year Award	Longlist	
2009	Friend of the Devil	Theakstons Old Peculier Crime Novel of the Year Award	Shortlist	
2010	All the Colours of Darkness	Theakstons Old Peculier Crime Novel of the Year Award	Shortlist	
2014	Children of the Revolution	Theakstons Old Peculier Crime Novel of the Year Award	Longlist	
2018	Sleeping in the Ground	Arthur Ellis Award for Best Crime Novel	Winner	

== TV adaptations ==
In July 2010, ITV commissioned a television adaptation of the novel Aftermath with Stephen Tompkinson playing the role of Banks. The adaptation was broadcast as two one-hour episodes, airing on 27 September and 4 October 2010. The viewing figures were successful enough for three more adaptations to be commissioned–Playing With Fire, Friend Of The Devil, and Cold Is The Grave–under a series title DCI Banks showing as six one-hour episodes, which started airing on 16 September 2011. The series went on for four more seasons, with the fifth and final season airing in 2016.

== Books ==
1. Gallows View (1987)
2. A Dedicated Man (1988)
3. A Necessary End (1989)
4. The Hanging Valley (1989)
5. Past Reason Hated (1991)
6. Wednesday's Child (1992)
7. Dry Bones that Dream (1994) (published in the United States as Final Account)
8. Innocent Graves (1996)
9. Dead Right (1997) (published in the United States as Blood at the Root)
10. In a Dry Season (1999)
11. Cold is the Grave (2000)
12. Aftermath (2001)
13. The Summer that Never Was (2003) (published in the United States as Close to Home)
14. Playing with Fire (2004)
15. Strange Affair (2005)
16. Piece of My Heart (2006)
17. Friend of the Devil (2007)
18. All the Colours of Darkness (2008)
19. Bad Boy (2010)
20. Watching the Dark (2012)
21. Children of the Revolution (2013)
22. Abattoir Blues (2014) (published in the United States as In the Dark Places)
23. When the Music's Over (2016)
24. Sleeping in the Ground (2017)
25. Careless Love (2018)
26. Many Rivers to Cross (2019)
27. Not Dark Yet (2021)
28. Standing in the Shadows (2023)
