= List of DCI Banks episodes =

British television crime series episodes

The following is a list of the 32 episodes of the ITV crime drama series DCI Banks, starring Stephen Tompkinson (series 1–5), Andrea Lowe (series 1–5) and Caroline Catz (series 2–5). Five series plus a pilot episode of the series have been broadcast between 27 September 2010 and 5 October 2016. From June 2014, the first series was repeated on ITV Encore.

== Series overview ==
Series	Episodes	Originally released	
Series	Episodes	First released	Last released
1	8	27 September 2010	21 October 2011
2	6	10 October 2012	8 November 2012
3	6	3 February 2014	10 March 2014
4	6	4 March 2015	8 April 2015
5	6	31 August 2016	5 October 2016

== Episodes ==
=== Series 1 (2010–11) ===
In January 2010, author Peter Robinson announced that he had signed a joint deal with Left Bank Pictures and ITV to adapt novels from the Detective Chief Inspector Alan Banks series for television. Filming of a two-part serial based on the novel Aftermath was completed in July 2010, with scenes filmed on location in Leeds. Aftermath aired on ITV on 27 September – 4 October 2010. The two episodes drew a strong average of 6.55 million viewers, twice becoming the fifth most-watched programme on the ITV network that week. Viewer ratings for the pilot were strong enough to persuade ITV to commission a further six episodes. These consisted of three two-part episodes based on the novels Playing with Fire, Friend of the Devil and Cold is the Grave. Filming began in February 2011, and filming locations included the town of Otley, in which the majority of the episode Friend of the Devil was filmed. This was identifiable by the fact that some shop names in the town were left unchanged during filming. The first episode, Playing with Fire, aired 16 September 2011, and drew an average of 4.5 million viewers. Subsequent episodes achieved similar ratings.

No. overall	No. in series	Title	Directed by	Written by	Original release date	UK viewers (millions)
1	1	"Aftermath – Part 1"	James Hawes	Robert Murphy	27 September 2010	6.66
An officer is killed while responding to a domestic disturbance call. His partner subdues the killer, Marcus Payne, but Payne ends up in a coma. When DCI Banks investigates the grisly scene, he discovers it's the home of a serial rapist and murderer. The victims of four open cases are found dead in the cellar. The fifth is missing and may still be alive, and Banks is haunted by the desire to find her.
2	2	"Aftermath – Part 2"	James Hawes	Robert Murphy	4 October 2010	6.89
DS Annie Cabbot is investigating for Professional Standards the apparently extreme assault on Marcus Payne, who has died from his injuries. Banks suspects Payne's wife Lucy is complicit in the murders, while Cabbot must prove that the second officer used excessive force. When Lucy's true identity is revealed, it complicates the case, but does not deter Banks from his goal.
3	3	"Playing with Fire – Part 1"	Paul Whittington	Robert Murphy	16 September 2011	5.10
Two bodies are found after a fatal fire on two narrow boats. Police suspect arson, and the discovery of a forged Turner landscape leads DCI Banks and DS Cabbot to connect the victims to an art forgery scam. Cabbot becomes involved with art expert Mark Keane, who is assisting with the investigation. Banks, meanwhile, suspects that Patrick Aspern, father of one of the victims, is deliberately withholding vital information.
4	4	"Playing with Fire – Part 2"	Paul Whittington	Robert Murphy	23 September 2011	5.33
A third victim is discovered and Banks, the subject of a possible complaint by the Asperns, is determined to identify the man behind the art forgery scam. Cabbot's relationship with Keane makes her a target for the killer, with nearly disastrous consequences.
5	5	"Friend of the Devil – Part 1"	Bill Anderson	Laurence Davey	30 September 2011	4.66
DCI Banks assigns DS Cabbot as Senior Investigating Officer (SIO) on a case involving the mutilated body of a woman found on the Yorkshire moors, while he investigates the murder of teenager Hayley Daniels, whose body has been found in a storage room in a dark alleyway. Cabbot discovers that her victim was Lucy Payne.
6	6	"Friend of the Devil – Part 2"	Bill Anderson	Laurence Davey	7 October 2011	5.44
When DC Templeton's body is discovered in the same alleyway, killed in the same way as Lucy, Cabbot becomes convinced that the murders are connected. The suspect in the Daniels murder case is cleared, so Banks must establish how the real killer was able to avoid detection.
7	7	"Cold is the Grave – Part 1"	Marek Losey	Robert Murphy	14 October 2011	5.82
A man commits an armed robbery and is then brutally murdered. Meanwhile, DCI Banks' boss, Chief Superintendent Rydell wants Banks to find and bring home his runaway teenage daughter, Emily. DS Cabbot becomes convinced the robbery was staged. Banks shepherds Emily away from criminal Barry Clough in London and returns her to her family, but he's shocked when she turns up dead shortly afterward, appearing as though she's been brutally beaten.
8	8	"Cold is the Grave – Part 2"	Marek Losey	Robert Murphy	21 October 2011	5.89
Inquiries seem to reveal a connection between the two murders, and Banks and Cabbot come to suspect one of their team may be implicated in a criminal conspiracy.

=== Series 2 (2012) ===
Filming on Series 2 began in March 2012, and episodes began broadcasting from 10 October. Accompanying novels, with cover photos of Stephen Tompkinson, were released for sale on 25 October. Several new characters were introduced in Series 2, including Alan Banks' parents, Arthur (Keith Barron) and Ida Banks (Polly Hemmingway); DI Helen Morton (Caroline Catz), who fills in for DS Annie Cabbot while she is on maternity leave; and Chief Superintendent (CS) Ron McLaughlin (Nick Sidi), replacement for CS Gerry Rydell, who left when exposed as being corrupt at the end of the first series. Actress Andrea Lowe actually took maternity leave during filming of most of Series 2, and only appeared in a very brief role.

No. overall	No. in series	Title	Directed by	Written by	Original release date	UK viewers (millions)
9	1	"Strange Affair – Part 1"	Tim Fywell	Robert Murphy	10 October 2012	5.38
With DS Annie Cabbot about to take maternity leave, no-nonsense DI Helen Morton joins the team. A disturbing late-night message from his estranged brother Roy leads DCI Banks to go in search of him, without telling anyone. Meanwhile, DI Morton quickly alienates her colleagues with her tactless style at a murder scene, then makes matters worse by finding evidence linking Banks to the dead woman and speculating he could be a suspect. Banks delves deeper into Roy's life and uncovers questionable business transactions and associates.
10	2	"Strange Affair – Part 2"	Tim Fywell	Robert Murphy	17 October 2012	5.41
When Alan breaks the news to his parents that Roy has been murdered, they plead with him to find Roy's killer. Defying Morton, Banks returns to Eastvale CID and attempts to lead both investigations. He and DI Morton become convinced the key to cracking both cases lies with a woman being treated at a family planning clinic.
11	3	"Dry Bones That Dream – Part 1"	Jim Loach	Rob Williams	24 October 2012	5.46
A hitman bursts into the home of wealthy accountant Keith Rothwell, takes him to the garage and shoots him in cold blood, while his wife and daughter are inside the house. DCI Banks is instantly struck by the way the victim's family has responded to the shocking event. Evidence reveals Rothwell has been living a double life, and Banks and DI Helen Morton work together tentatively to investigate the murder of a mysterious victim with two identities. Possible links to a money-laundering operation plunge them into a high-profile fraud investigation with political ramifications.
12	4	"Dry Bones That Dream – Part 2"	Jim Loach	Rob Williams	31 October 2012	5.33
Alan's friend, Pamela Jefferies, lies in a coma following a vicious attack, and Banks becomes even more determined to find Rothwell's killer. Against orders, he questions MP Martin Fleming, which puts him on a collision course with his former rival DCI Burgess. Meanwhile, DI Morton pursues another suspect and puts pressure on Rothwell's family.
13	5	"Innocent Graves – Part 1"	Mat King	Andrew Payne	7 November 2012	5.39
Frustrated that a number of cases have been knocked back by the CPS, DCI Banks and his team are called on to investigate the murder of teenager Ellie Clayton, daughter of a high-profile Internet entrepreneur. The victim's background and the suggestion she may have been raped quickly make the incident the subject of media speculation, and strong evidence implicates a local theatre director who ran a drama workshop Ellie attended the night she was killed.
14	6	"Innocent Graves – Part 2"	Mat King	Andrew Payne	8 November 2012	4.94
Banks believes he's found his man, but DI Morton suspects her colleague isn't seeing the bigger picture. When the trial against theatre director Owen Pearce collapses, Banks and the team are forced to rebuild the case with entirely new evidence. As a new suspect for Ellie's murder comes to light, a second girl is found dead in similar circumstances, and she is soon identified as Becca Smith, Ellie's best friend.

=== Series 3 (2014) ===
In December 2012, Peter Robinson announced on his website that the series had been re-commissioned for a third series of three two-part episodes, and in June 2013 confirmed the titles of the episodes to be filmed. The series began filming in August 2013, and began airing from February 2014. Lowe reprises her role as DS Cabbot after being on maternity leave for the majority of Series 2; Catz also reprises her role as DI Morton. Series 3 sees the departure of DS Jackman (Lorraine Burroughs); however Jack Deam returns to the series as DS Blackstone, Nick Sidi reprises his role as CS McLaughlin, and Danny Rahim joins the cast as DC Lang.

No. overall	No. in series	Title	Directed by	Written by	Original release date	UK viewers (millions)
15	1	"Wednesday's Child – Part 1"	Bill Eagles	Robert Murphy	3 February 2014	7.60 (Note: 6.37 million on ITV, 749,000 on the ITV HD simulcast, and 483,000 on ITV +1.)
A strange man and woman turn up on the doorstep of Kyle Heath, an eleven-year-old local school boy, claiming to be social workers having received a report of abuse against the child. As they make the decision to take the child from his mother's custody, little does she know that the man and the woman are in fact child abductors, who have no connection to social services, but with good intentions because the boy is in a bad situation.
16	2	"Wednesday's Child – Part 2"	Bill Eagles	Robert Murphy	10 February 2014	6.82
A search for the missing boy soon gets underway, but the discovery of a large quantity of drugs underneath the floorboards of his living room reveals some rather dark and sinister secrets. DI Morton suspects that the child's abduction, however, was planned by his own mother to extort money. The boy's headteacher soon becomes prime suspect when evidence reveals he was with the boy the night after he disappeared. Meanwhile, Banks' attempt to protect Annie from the emotions of the case draw them closer together.
17	3	"Piece of My Heart – Part 1"	Ed Bazalgette	Robert Murphy	17 February 2014	6.63
The body of journalist Matt Barber, found in a chalet deep within the hills of a remote village, connects Banks to the death of John Gaunt, played by actor Andre Gwilliam, a guitarist for a band known as "The Crystal Kiss", who died during the 1980s. His band-mate, and best friend, Martin Hareford, was sent to prison on the grounds of manslaughter, serving five years for Gaunt's death. Banks finds himself not only investigating Matt Barber's death, but re-opening the Gaunt case in order to identify a potential cover-up which is threatening to hide the truth behind Barber's death.
18	4	"Piece of My Heart – Part 2"	Ed Bazalgette	Robert Murphy	24 February 2014	6.77
As Banks finds himself raking over bad memories for those involved, DI Morton finds herself suspicious of Barber's father Jack, who was the investigating officer in the Gaunt case, and who extracted a confession from Martin Hareford. However, when the files reveal the confession has disappeared, DI Morton suspects that Jack has more to do with his son's death than he is letting on.
19	5	"Bad Boy – Part 1"	Stephen Woolfenden	Catherine Tregenna	3 March 2014	5.83
Club DJ Richard Martin is run off the road and then shot in the head, after which the perpetrators dispose of his body and his car, as well as the gun used in the shooting. When the gun turns up in the bedroom of Erin Doyle, the daughter of Banks' long-term neighbours, Banks decides to act quietly to remove the gun without fuss. However, DI Morton overrules him, forcing him to follow procedure. The team organizes a full-blown raid which results in Erin's father, Peter Doyle, being tasered, resulting in a heart attack.
20	6	"Bad Boy – Part 2"	Stephen Woolfenden	Catherine Tregenna	10 March 2014	5.81
As Banks, Blackstone, and Lang investigate Martin's death, Annie is forced to conduct an official investigation into Helen's actions, an investigation which threatens to destroy Banks' team. As the team identify Jaff Kitson as the possible murderer, Erin reveals that Jaff's new girlfriend is none other than Banks' own daughter, Tracy. Banks has to decide between his family loyalties, his moral actions, and the hope of a relationship with Annie, in order to secure the safety of his daughter.

=== Series 4 (2015) ===
Filming on the fourth series began in August 2014. For the first time since the series' debut, the fourth series did not feature any changes to the cast. It was also notable for being the first series which consists of entirely unique stories for television, choosing not to adapt any further novels by Robinson. Likewise, it also meant that an entirely new writing team were brought in to script the series, with newcomer Nicholas Hicks-Beach, who first wrote scripts for fellow ITV production Law & Order: UK being introduced as head writer. Some viewers suggested that it brought a "grittier" feel to the show. Noel Farragher was originally confirmed as the writer for the second story, but was replaced by Nicholas Hicks-Beach for reasons unknown.

No. overall	No. in series	Title	Directed by	Written by	Original release date	UK viewers (millions)
21	1	"What Will Survive – Part 1"	David Richards	Nicholas Hicks-Beach	4 March 2015	5.50
A young Estonian woman is found dead on a piece of wasteground, suspected of having been buried alive. As they piece together her prior movements, the team uncover a world of prostitution and drugs hidden behind a respectable veneer. They discover that the murder victim had come to the UK searching for her sister, who went missing recently. No one wants to talk – but they eventually trace her sister's pimp, who claims to run a legitimate escort business.
22	2	"What Will Survive – Part 2"	David Richards	Nicholas Hicks-Beach	11 March 2015	5.86 (Note: 4.68 million on ITV, 869,000 on the ITV HD simulcast, and 315,000 on ITV +1.)
Helen and Banks make inroads with the prostitutes' driver, and Helen begins to suspect his autistic son might have had something to do with Katrin's death. But when their house is burned down in a tragic fire, Banks and his team begin to uncover an even more disturbing truth.
23	3	"Buried – Part 1"	Craig Pickles	Nicholas Hicks-Beach	18 March 2015	5.31
A husband and daughter struggle to come to terms with their grief when the body of wife and mother Anaan Kamel is found washed up by an underground river. Suspicion falls on Marcus Leyton, a former employee of Anaan and Raheel's law chambers, who was recently fired by Raheel – especially when texts between her and Marcus suggest an affair which progressed to blackmail on his part. The team struggles to find further information about Marcus, as his records only seem to go back five years.
24	4	"Buried – Part 2"	Craig Pickles	Nicholas Hicks-Beach	25 March 2015	5.33
Banks and Helen believe that the family are hiding something when daughter Nafeesah makes up a story about her mother recently falling down the stairs, until she eventually reveals that Anaan's brother Bilal hit her in an argument over her conduct and wavering faith.
25	5	"Ghosts – Part 1"	Kenneth Glenaan	Paul Logue	1 April 2015	4.92
The body of a university undergraduate, Josh Tate, is found dumped in a ravine, stabbed with something like a screwdriver. His flatmate, Spencer, says Josh was the quiet type – he last saw him heading off to his part time job at the uni lab. As the team piece together his movements, a picture emerges of another Josh, who was infatuated with his friend Spencer's lap-dancer girlfriend Melanie, and was also manufacturing the drug "ecstasy" for club owner Fallon with the help of his biochemistry tutor. Helen is unnerved by the arrival of former lover Martin Hexton, an undercover officer who claims to be working a case in Yorkshire, just as her own husband Michael reveals he wants custody of their children.
26	6	"Ghosts – Part 2"	Kenneth Glenaan	Paul Logue	8 April 2015	4.86
Evidence seems to point to Fallon as Josh's murderer, and the team head to arrest him. But breaking into his flat, they find him badly beaten, and it looks like Hexton might be responsible. Banks is furious with Helen for not revealing the full extent of her relationship with Hexton earlier. She tries to win back his faith by leading him to Hexton’s B and B, but Hexton has disappeared. Unbeknownst to the team, he now appears to be stalking Melanie.

=== Series 5 (2016) ===
Filming on the fifth and final series began in February 2016. Samuel Anderson and Shaun Dingwall were announced as newcomers to the cast on 23 February, playing the roles of DC Vince Grady and Chief Superintendent Colin Anderson respectively. For the first time, as well as focusing on three separate cases, the series featured an ongoing story arc across all six episodes, focusing on the ongoing investigation into career criminal Steve Richards (Shaun Dooley) and his wife Tamsin (Maimie McCoy). Chris Murray was originally confirmed as the writer for the first story, but was replaced by Nicholas Hicks-Beach for reasons unknown.

No. overall	No. in series	Title	Directed by	Written by	Original release date	UK viewers (millions)
27	1	"To Burn in Every Drop of Blood – Part 1"	Robert Quinn	Nicholas Hicks-Beach	31 August 2016	6.20
Drug dealer Damon Horsley is murdered at the woodland shrine of suicide Sian Haddon, Sian's teen-aged friend Kyle Finn finding the body. Banks discovers that Horsley owed money to Charlie Franklin, whom Banks suspects of dealing on behalf of outwardly respectable property developer Steve Richards.
28	2	"To Burn in Every Drop of Blood – Part 2"	Robert Quinn	Nicholas Hicks-Beach	7 September 2016	5.51
Kat is found dead after admitting to Horsley's murder, but Banks is not convinced she died by her own hand though her former therapist, Kyle's mother Alice, claims that she had lately been depressed. Richards himself uses violence to pursue his own enquiries with Nathan, Horsley's brother, surviving a hit-and-run attempt by Franklin.
29	3	"A Little Bit of Heart – Part 1"	Craig Pickles	Nicholas Hicks-Beach	14 September 2016	5.48
Rachel Li reports her husband, property owner and philanthropist Xun, missing. Banks learns that the family were dissidents who had to flee China and interviews Xun's brother Chang, his niece Wei, and his own son Bo, a hospital worker who does not get on with his father. There is a ransom request to his wife, which she follows while surrounded by police. The police find Li, who is put in hospital to recover from exposure.
30	4	"A Little Bit of Heart – Part 2"	Craig Pickles	Nicholas Hicks-Beach	21 September 2016	5.48
Li is found dead in his home by his wife, clear plastic over his head. Banks deduces that Xun Li knew his killer as he had opened the door to someone. His son Bo is the prime suspect; Xun's first wife died giving birth to him, and he is a disappointment to his father. However fibres found on Xun's clothes point to Wendy Xiao, whose protection racket Xun was seeking to expose. Xun's brother killed him accidentally, after hearing a video from China of Xun describing the people he named for prison in China, giving up his brother and his wife to authorities to save his own life. The brother gave a taste of the torture which brought on a fatal asthma attack. While the team celebrates Helen Morton's promotion to DCI, Annie meets someone in a restaurant, calls Banks from an alley nearby, and she is stabbed after telling him where she is.
31	5	"Undertow – Part 1"	Mark Brozel	Paul Logue	28 September 2016	5.25
Banks and the team begin the painful job of finding out exactly who was responsible for Annie's death. Banks leads a risky car chase of a suspect, who is taken for questioning but there is insufficient evidence to charge him. Chief Superintendent Anderson puts pressure on Helen to rein in Banks, Banks is certain that this is all down to one man – crime boss Steve Richards. Banks' obsession with nailing Richards sends him over the edge, so Anderson puts Banks on leave and appoints Morton as acting DCI for this case.
32	6	"Undertow – Part 2"	Mark Brozel	Paul Logue	5 October 2016	5.47
Though told he is on leave and off the case, Banks continues to interrogate suspects. While the team work on leads to Charlie Franklin, reported missing by his sister who awaits his bone marrow to cure her, Banks operates on the other side of the law, using physical violence to secure a break-through. The team is close to bringing Steve Richards to justice when one suspect confesses to a murder with no involvement by Richards, which means Banks and the team need to find another connection. Banks and Morton confront their newest detective who admits to being an agent for Richards, who threatens harm to the detective's father. Banks pursues Richards in his home, and they engage in a fight. His wife Tamsin then joins them, confessing and explaining how each person was murdered. Richards is arrested. The closing scene shows Banks at a cairn he erected for Annie. He speaks how he, David and Isla will live on after her demise, and how he misses her.

== Overseas ==
DCI Banks has been shown in many markets around the world.

It was broadcast in Saudi Arabia by OSN (Orbit Showtime Network) which had forged an exclusive deal with BBC First HD that would carry the broadcast to the Middle East and North Africa with programming screening 48 hours after their UK premiere.

In Denmark, all series aired on DR1 and as one single "full-length" story. In Sweden, SVT 1 aired the pilot and first four series. In France and Germany, Arte aired the pilot and first two series.

In the United States (and Canada through cable feeds), the series was made available on many PBS stations, delayed a few weeks after UK broadcast.

In Portugal, the Fox Crime cable channel started to air the pilot and first series on 4 September 2014, which were re-aired in July 2014, together with the second series. As is normal in Portugal the transmission was in the original English version with Portuguese subtitles.

In Finland, Yle showed the pilot and Series 1 in August 2012, Series 2 in August 2013, Series 3 in January–February 2016, Series 4 in February 2016, and Series 5 in January 2017. All episodes were aired as one single "full-length" story and with Finnish subtitles. The episodes were made available for viewing from Finland at the Yle website for 14 days following the initial broadcast.

In Australia, the series was shown on the national broadcaster, the ABC, on Saturday nights.

In the Netherlands, the pilot and series 1 to 5 were aired as one episode by the national broadcaster NPO.
