= Not Safe After Dark =

Short story collection by Peter Robinson

- 1998 edition
- Author: Peter Robinson
- Language: English
- Genre: Short story collection
- Publisher: Crippen & Landru
- Publication date: 1998 & 2004
- Publication place: Canada
- Media type: Print (hardcover)
- Pages: 422
- ISBN: 1-4050-2111-X

Not Safe After Dark (1998) is the first collection of short stories by Peter Robinson; it includes stories previously published in crime anthologies and magazines. They include three Inspector Banks short stories, one (Going Back) previously unpublished. The 1998 edition published by Crippen & Landru, Virginia as Not Safe After Dark and Other Stories included thirteen stories (according to the author’s website); the 2004 edition published by Macmillan, London as Not Safe After Dark and Other Works included twenty stories. Robinson is the writer of the Inspector Banks series of novels.

== Contents ==
The stories are set in Yorkshire, London, Canada (often Toronto), the United States, Paris and Vienna. Several involve miscarriages of justice: either an innocent person convicted or no-one convicted. Two stories in Not Safe After Dark: Missing in Action and In Flanders Fields are set in wartime (1940s) Yorkshire with Frank Bascombe a "special constable in the war" and veteran of World War I. They were written after researching the period for In a Dry Season. The story Cornelius Jubb in The Price of Love was intended as the third and refers to "Constable Bascombe", although Robinson could not use the full name Frank Bascombe in that collection for copyright reasons; see introduction and afternotes to the collections.

Those from anthologies often involve a theme specified by the editor or a source, which are given below if stated by Robinson in the Introduction to the collection. The year of original publication is given in brackets.

== Contents ==
- Summer Rain: a DCI Banks story (1994) Set in July 1998, a visiting American claims to have died fourteen times, and that on his last death he was murdered. Includes DC Susan Gay.
- Fan Mail (1989) Source: a fragment of dreams. A crime writer Dennis Quilley from Toronto is blackmailed by the wife of a crime fan who is more intelligent than her husband.
- Innocence (1990) Terry Reed was accused then cleared of the murder of a schoolgirl; Rewritten as a novel from Reed’s point of view, then rewritten with DI Banks as Innocent Graves (1996).
- Murder in Utopia (2000). Set in 1916 Yorkshire.
- Not Safe After Dark (1992) He decides to walk through a city park after dark, He imagines dangers from the sounds at night, then decides “it was safe after dark. Perfectly safe”.
- Just My Luck (1992) Walter Dimchuk, a Torontonian at a conference in Los Angeles picks up a hooker, then another one.
- Anna Said: a DCI Banks story in 10 sections (1992) with DI Susan Gay. Anna Said appears to have died from flu or food poisoning, but she was poisoned by a condom laced with pesticide.
- Missing in Action (2000) With Frank Bascombe, set in wartime Yorkshire.
- Memory Lane (1998) Source: stories recounted by others. A Muso at a “shitty gig” in a Vancouver nursing home.
- Carrion (1995) Source: an unusual piece of information. A bank worker in The City meets a stranger in his lunchtime pub.
- April in Paris (2001) Set in 1968 Paris, the summer of revolution. April smokes, but she is "killed by love".
- The Good Partner: a DCI Banks story (1994) Kim Fosse has been murdered and her husband David is suspected. Set in November 1993, and involves DC Susan Gay.
- Some Land in Florida (1996) Set in Florida among Canadian vacationers, Bud Schiller dies in a condo pool, dressed as Santa Claus. But he has duped several people of their life savings in land scams, and the "gumshoe" narrator decides it was not suspicious.
- The Wrong Hands (1998) Source: stories recounted by others. An old man gets rid of an unlicensed gun.
- The Two Ladies of Rose Cottage (1997) Set in 1930s to 1950s Yorkshire, about two old ladies and the mystery of Rose Cottage.
- Lawn Sale (1994) Set in the Toronto "Beaches" about the theft of a man's mementos of his dead wife.
- Gone to the Dawgs (2002) Theme American Football. Set in Toronto; a man lives with his hypochondriac mother. An objectional regular acquaintance at his local bar is killed in a hit-and-run.
- In Flanders Fields (first published in this collection) With Frank Bascombe, set in wartime Yorkshire.
- The Duke’s Wife (2002) Theme Shakespeare, set in Vienna when ruled by a Duke.
- Going Back: a DCI Banks novella in 22 sections (2004, previously unpublished) Written in early 1999 between In a Dry Season and Cold Is the Grave, Banks goes home and responds to his family, the place where he grew up and the disappearance of an old school friend. At 106 pages in manuscript (87 pages in the collection; from the 2004 introduction to the collection) it was too long for magazines or anthologies, so it gathered dust" until he included parts about the young Banks and family into The Summer that Never Was. When revised for this collection he shifted it chronologically to fall between The Summer that Never Was and Playing with Fire and tried to avoid too much repetition of details cannibalized for the novel.
