= Hammett Prize =

Literary prize

- Description: Annual award for a book in English in the field of crime writing by a Canadian or US citizen or permanent resident
- Country: United States and Canada
- Presented by: International Association of Crime Writers, North American Branch (IACW/NA)

The Hammett Prize is awarded annually by the International Association of Crime Writers, North American Branch (IACW/NA) to a Canadian or US citizen or permanent resident for a book in English in the field of crime writing. Established in 1991, it is named after crime-writer Dashiell Hammett.

== Recipients ==
Prize winners and finalists
Year	Author	Title	Result	Ref.
1991	Elmore Leonard	Maximum Bob	Winner	
1991	Jerome Charyn	Elsinore	Finalist	
1991	Norman Mailer	Harlot’s Ghost	Finalist	
1991	Paul West	The Women of Whitechapel & Jack the Ripper	Finalist	
1991	Robertson Davies	Murther & Walking Spirits	Finalist	
1992	Alice Hoffman	Turtle Moon	Winner	
1992	Daniel Woodrell	The Ones You Do	Special mention	
1992	Donald E. Westlake	Humans	Finalist	
1992	Jane Stanton Hitchcock	Trick of the Eye	Finalist	
1992	Walter Mosley	White Butterfly	Finalist	
1993	James Crumley	The Mexican Tree Duck	Winner	
1993	Michael Connelly	The Black Ice	Finalist	
1993	Randall Silvis	An Occasional Hell	Finalist	
1993	Sandra West Prowell	By Evil Means	Finalist	
1993	Steven Saylor	Catilina’s Riddle	Finalist	
1994	James Lee Burke	Dixie City Jam	Winner	
1994	Laura Joh Rowland	Shinjū	Finalist	
1994	Mikal Gilmore	Shot in the Heart	Finalist	
1994	Pinckney Benedict	Dogs of God	Finalist	
1994	Steve Lopez	Third and Indiana	Finalist	
1995	Mary Willis Walker	Under the Beetle's Cellar	Winner	
1995	Andrew Klavan	True Crime	Finalist	
1995	Michael Connelly	The Last Coyote	Finalist	
1995	Susan Taylor Chehak	Smithereens	Finalist	
1995	Thomas H. Cook	Breakheart Hill	Finalist	
1996	Martin Cruz Smith	Rose	Winner	
1996	James W. Hall	Buzz Cut	Finalist	
1996	Michael Connelly	The Poet	Finalist	
1996	Peter Robinson	Innocent Graves	Finalist	
1996	Stephen Solomita	Damaged Goods	Finalist	
1997	William Deverell	Trial of Passion	Winner	
1997	Bill Pronzini	A Wasteland of Strangers	Finalist	
1997	James Lee Burke	Cimarron Rose	Finalist	
1997	L. R. Wright	Acts of Murder	Finalist	
1997	Michael Connelly	Trunk Music	Finalist	
1998	William Hoffman	Tidewater Blood	Winner	
1998	Daniel Woodrell	Tomato Red	Finalist	
1998	Domenic Stansberry	The Last Days of Il Duce	Finalist	
1998	Kevin McColley	Praying to a Laughing God	Finalist	
1998	Robert Noah	The Man Who Stole the Mona Lisa	Finalist	
1999	Martin Cruz Smith	Havana Bay	Winner	
1999	James Lee Burke	Heartwood	Finalist	
1999	Peter Robinson	In a Dry Season	Finalist	
1999	Robert Crais	L.A. Requiem	Finalist	
1999	Scott Turow	Personal Injuries	Finalist	
2000	Margaret Atwood	The Blind Assassin	Winner	
2000	Brad Smith	One-Eyed Jacks	Finalist	
2000	Joe R. Lansdale	The Bottoms	Finalist	
2000	Scott Phillips	The Ice Harvest	Finalist	
2000	Stephen Hunter	Hot Springs	Finalist	
2001	Alan Furst	Kingdom of Shadows	Winner	
2001	Dennis Lehane	Mystic River	Finalist	
2001	George Pelecanos	Right as Rain	Finalist	
2001	Rob Reuland	Hollowpoint	Finalist	
2001	T. Jefferson Parker	Silent Joe	Finalist	
2002	Owen Parry	Honor’s Kingdom	Winner	
2002	J. Robert Janes	Flykiller	Finalist	
2002	James Lee Burke	The Jolie Blon’s Bounce	Finalist	
2002	John Case	The Eighth Day	Finalist	
2002	Walter Mosley	Bad Boy Brawly Brown	Finalist	
2003	Carol Goodman	The Seduction of Water	Winner	
2003	Dennis Lehane	Shutter Island	Finalist	
2003	Giles Blunt	The Delicate Storm	Finalist	
2003	Laura Lippman	Every Secret Thing	Finalist	
2003	Michael Gruber	Tropic of Night	Finalist	
2004	Chuck Hogan	Prince of Thieves	Winner	
2004	Colin Harrison	The Havana Room	Finalist	
2004	John Katzenbach	The Madman's Tale	Finalist	
2004	Peter Robinson	Playing with Fire	Finalist	
2004	T. Jefferson Parker	California Girl	Finalist	
2005	Joseph Kanon	Alibi	Winner	
2005	Cormac McCarthy	No Country for Old Men	Finalist	
2005	Don Winslow	The Power of the Dog	Finalist	
2005	John Brady	Islandbridge	Finalist	
2005	Martin Limón	The Door to Bitterness	Finalist	
2006	Dan Fesperman	The Prisoner of Guantánamo	Winner	
2006	Bill Pronzini	The Crimes of Jordan Wise	Finalist	
2006	Jim Nisbet	Dark Companion	Finalist	
2006	John Case	Ghost Dancer	Finalist	
2006	Robert Ward	Four Kinds of Rain	Finalist	
2007	Gil Adamson	The Outlander	Winner	
2007	Katie Estill	Dahlia’s Gone	Finalist	
2007	Martin Cruz Smith	Stalin’s Ghost	Finalist	
2007	Michael Chabon	The Yiddish Policemen's Union	Finalist	
2007	Michael Dibdin	End Games	Finalist	
2008	George Pelecanos	The Turnaround	Winner	
2008	Abraham Rodríguez	South by South Bronx	Finalist	
2008	Colin Harrison	The Finder	Finalist	
2008	David Levien	City of the Sun	Finalist	
2008	Heywood Gould	Leading Lady	Finalist	
2009	Jedediah Berry	The Manual of Detection	Winner	
2009	Ace Atkins	Devil’s Garden	Finalist	
2009	George Pelecanos	The Way Home	Finalist	
2009	Megan Abbott	Bury Me Deep	Finalist	
2009	Walter Mosley	The Long Fall	Finalist	
2010	Olen Steinhauer	The Nearest Exit	Winner	
2010	Jonathan Eig	Get Capone: The Secret Plot That Captured America’s Most Wanted Gangster	Finalist	
2010	T. Jefferson Parker	Iron River	Finalist	
2010	Tom Franklin	Crooked Letter, Crooked Letter	Finalist	
2011	James Sallis	The Killer Is Dying	Winner	
2011	James Lee Burke	Feast Day of Fools	Finalist	
2011	Michael Ondaatje	The Cat's Table	Finalist	
2011	Sara Gran	Claire DeWitt and the City of the Dead	Finalist	
2011	Thomas Perry	The Informant	Finalist	
2012	Howard Owen	Oregon Hill	Winner	
2012	G. Willow Wilson	Alif the Unseen	Finalist	
2012	Jim Lynch	Truth Like the Sun	Finalist	
2012	Kurt Palka	Patient Number 7	Finalist	
2012	William Landay	Defending Jacob	Finalist	
2013	Richard Lange	Angel Baby	Winner	
2013	Craig Davidson	Cataract City	Finalist	
2013	George P. Pelecanos	The Double	Finalist	
2013	Heywood Gould	Green Light for Murder	Finalist	
2013	Lisa Moore	Caught	Finalist	
2014	Stephen King	Mr. Mercedes	Winner	
2014	James Lee Burke	Wayfaring Stranger	Finalist	
2014	Krista Foss	Smoke River	Finalist	
2014	Peyton Marshall	Goodhouse	Finalist	
2014	Tod Goldberg	Gangsterland	Finalist	
2015	Lisa Sandlin	The Do-Right	Winner	
2015	Harlan Coben	The Stranger	Finalist	
2015	Harry Brandt	The Whites	Finalist	
2015	Michael J. McCann	Sorrow Lake	Finalist	
2015	Stu Strumwasser	The Organ Broker	Finalist	
2016	Domenic Stansberry	The White Devil	Winner	
2016	Bob Truluck	The Big Nothing	Finalist	
2016	Duane Swierczynski	Revolver	Finalist	
2016	Nicholas Petrie	The Drifter	Finalist	
2016	Steve Hamilton	The Second Life of Nick Mason	Finalist	
2017	Stephen Mack Jones	August Snow	Winner	
2017	Ernest J. Gaines	The Tragedy of Brady Sims	Finalist	
2017	Karen Dionne	The Marsh King’s Daughter	Finalist	
2017	Randall Silvis	Two Days Gone	Finalist	
2018	Lou Berney	November Road	Winner	
2018	Lisa Unger	Under My Skin	Finalist	
2018	Robert Olen Butler	Paris in the Dark	Finalist	
2018	Sam Wiebe	Cut You Down	Finalist	
2018	William Boyle	The Lonely Witness	Finalist	
2019	Jane Stanton Hitchcock	Bluff	Winner	
2019	Jonathan Moore	Blood Relations	Finalist	
2019	Nicholas Meyer	The Adventure of the Peculiar Protocols	Finalist	
2019	Peter Houlahan	Norco ’80: The True Story of the Most Spectacular Bank Robbery in American History	Finalist	
2019	William Bayer	The Murals	Finalist	
2020	David Joy	When These Mountains Burn	Winner	
2020	Cara Black	Three Hours in Paris	Finalist	
2020	David Heska Wanbli Weiden	Winter Counts	Finalist	
2020	Nev March	Murder in Old Bombay	Finalist	
2020	Sarah Stewart Taylor	The Mountains Wild	Finalist	
2021	S. A. Cosby	Razorblade Tears	Winner	
2021	William Deverell	Stung	Finalist	
2021	James Kestrel	Five Decembers	Finalist	
2021	Colson Whitehead	Harlem Shuffle	Finalist	
2021	Robin Yocum	The Sacrifice of Lester Yates	Finalist	
2022	Samantha Jayne Allen	Pay Dirt Road	Winner	
2022	Brad Smith	Copperhead Road	Finalist	
2022	Eli Cranor	Don't Know Tough	Finalist	
2022	Lisa Scottoline	What Happened to the Bennetts	Finalist	
2022	Chuck Hogan	Gangland	Finalist	
2023	Colson Whitehead	Crook Manifesto	Winner	
2023	Gail Anderson-Dargatz	The Almost Widow	Finalist	
2023	Sterling Watson	Night Letter	Finalist	
2023	Clémence Michallon	The Quiet Tenant	Finalist	
2023	Margaret Verble	Stealing	Finalist	
2024	Liz Moore	The God of the Woods	Winner	
2024	William Deverell	The Long-Shot Trial	Finalist	
2024	Dietrich Kalteis	Crooked	Finalist	
2024	Katrina Carrasco	Rough Trade	Finalist	
2024	Eli Cranor	Broiler	Finalist	
2025	Ron Currie	The Savage, Noble Death of Babs Dionne	Winner	
2025	Megan Abbott	El Dorado Drive	Finalist	
2025	Domenic Stansbery	The Lizard	Finalist	
2025	Robert Crais	The Big Empty	Finalist	
2025	Kelsey Cox	Party of Liars	Finalist	
