= Watching the Dark (novel) =

2012 novel by Peter Robinson

- First edition (UK)
- Author: Peter Robinson
- Language: English
- Series: Inspector Alan Banks, #20
- Genre: Crime novel
- Publisher: Hodder & Stoughton (UK); McClelland & Stewart (Canada); William Morrow (US)
- Publication date: 16 August 2012
- Publication place: Canada
- Media type: Print (hardback)
- ISBN: 1444704877
- Preceded by: Bad Boy
- Followed by: Children of the Revolution

Watching the Dark is the 20th novel by Canadian detective fiction writer Peter Robinson in the Inspector Banks series, published in August 2012.

== Plot ==
DCI Alan Banks is back, and this time he is investigating the murder of one of his own. Respected Officer DI Bill Quinn has been shot through the heart by a bolt from a crossbow while convalescing at the St. Peter's Police Treatment Centre, and the initial investigation uncovers compromising photos with a very young woman in his room. Assigned to assist DCI Banks is Professional Standards Inspector Joanna Passero, and as the investigation progresses they uncover a link with a cold case that takes them to Tallinn, Estonia to unearth the truth.

== Reception ==
Cheryl Parker of the Postmedia Network wrote that while the novel is "not Robinson's most creative book", fans of the crime genre "will be satisfied with another good read." Sarah Weinman of the National Post opined that while Robinson "sounds many familiar notes" in the novel, he "is still writing at a very high level" and "is able to sustain that level of consistency with each subsequent book." Michael W. Higgins of the Telegraph-Journal opined that the novel's strengths include "dilligent research, local atmosphere, skillful plotting" while its weaknesses include "unpersuasive characterisation, poor differentiation of voice, needless padding."
