= Dead Right =

Dead Right may refer to:

- Dead Right (novel), a 1997 novel by Peter Robinson
- Dead Right (film), a 1993 short film by Edgar Wright
- "Dead Right", episode S02E01 of Tales from the Crypt
