= Price of Love =

Price of Love may refer to:

- "Price of Love" (Bad English song), a 1990 song
- "Price of Love", a 2003 song from the album Client by Client
- Price of Love (film), a 2015 Ethiopian film

== See also ==
- The Price of Love (disambiguation)
