= Abattoir Blues =

Abattoir Blues may refer to:

- Abattoir Blues (novel), 2014, by Peter Robinson
- Abattoir Blues / The Lyre of Orpheus, a 2004 album by Nick Cave and the Bad Seeds
