= Caedmon's Song =

Book by Peter Robinson

- First edition
- Author: Peter Robinson
- Language: English
- Genre: Crime novel
- Publisher: Viking Press
- Publication date: 1990
- Publication place: Canada
- Media type: Print (hardback & paperback)
- Pages: 256 pp (first edition, hardback)
- ISBN: 0-670-83304-5 (first edition, hardback)
- OCLC: 24718391

Caedmon's Song is a novel written by Canadian crime writer Peter Robinson in 1990. Also known in the United States and Canada as The First Cut, it was Robinson's first novel not to feature Inspector Alan Banks. Although seemingly unrelated to the Banks series, Caedmon's Song is revisited in Robinson's Inspector Alan Banks novel Friend of the Devil, wherein the story is brought together with that from an earlier Banks novel, Aftermath, published in 1999 and 2007 respectively.

== Plot ==
One warm June night, a university student called Kirsten is viciously attacked in a park by a serial killer. He is interrupted, and Kirsten survives, but in a severe physically and psychologically damaged state. As the killer continues, leaving a longer trail of mutilated corpses, Kirsten confronts her memories and becomes convinced not only that she can, but that she must remember what happened. Through fragments of nightmares, the details slowly reveal themselves to Kirsten as she eventually finds out the truth. Interwoven with Kirsten's story is that of Martha Browne, a woman who arrives in the Yorkshire coastal town of Whitby with a sense of mission. Finally, the two strands are woven together and united in a startling, chilling conclusion.

== Analysis ==
=== Characters ===
Kirsten lives in an apartment with her best friend Sarah on the campus of an unnamed university. Her friends are Hugo, Damon and Galen; Galen is her boyfriend. After the attack, she tries to remember details about the assault with the help of psychiatrist Dr. Laura Henderson. During this time she lives at home with their parents in Brierley Coombe, even though relations are strained. The police, represented by Detective Superintendent Elswick and his assistant Detective Sergeant Haywood, question her about the case, but Kirsten tries to solve it on her own. She adopts the alias Martha Browne and kills Jack Grimley, whom she later realizes is innocent. Later she again changes her name and becomes Susan Bridehead. With this alias, she assaults and places Keith McLaren into a coma, and finally kills her assailant Greg Eastcote.

=== Structure ===
The novel is divided into forty-seven chapters, alternating between two story lines, one devoted to Kirsten and the other Martha and Susan. If all the chapters were put in chronological order, a logical course of action would be the result. However, the author decided to entwine both strands to emphasize the connection between the two main characters. The effect of this stylistic device is that the alternating chapters enlighten each other. The reader slowly gets the pieces of information he needs to understand the story. Just as Kirsten herself discovers what happened to her. The story is revealed bit by bit, and therefore it is thrilling until the end.

=== Setting ===
The two most important locations of the story are Bath and Whitby. Bath is described as a rather peaceful and idyllic place for wealthy people. Conversely, Whitby, fishing port and famous tourist destination, represents the rough life on the Yorkshire coast. And the landfall for Count Alucard's undead cargo, according to Bram Stoker. Since this was the home town of "England's first poet" Cædmon, who is the eponym for the book, Whitby plays an important role within the story. Other towns and villages on the north-east coast of England like Staithes, Robin Hood's Bay and Scarborough are mentioned when Kirsten visits them to look for her attacker. Another place mentioned in the text is Brierley Coombe, the fictitious home town of Kirsten. Brierley Coombe is assumed to be a suburb of Bath, and therefore it has similar features.

=== History ===
The title of the book alludes to the seventh century English poet. According to legend, Cædmon was at first unable to sing but then he was inspired to compose vernacular English poetry after a dream in which he is told, "Praise ye Creation" (p. 291). The "student slasher" feels connected with Cædmon since he also had a dream in which a stranger told him to "sing of destruction" (p. 291). In hypnotherapy, Kirsten remembers this story which her attacker told her while stabbing her. According to his story, he and Cædmon are from the same town. This leads Kirsten to the assumption that her attacker must live in Whitby.

=== The Yorkshire Ripper ===
The novel is based on the crimes of Peter Sutcliffe, infamous as the "Yorkshire Ripper" who was convicted in 1981 of the murders of thirteen women and attacks on seven more from 1975 to 1980. His attacks were similar to those of the "Student Slasher": he struck his victims to unconsciousness, e.g. with a ball-peen hammer, and slashed them with a knife. His first victim also survived his attack. The police were criticized for being inadequately prepared for an investigation on this scale. They resemble the detectives in Caedmon's Song, who are also unable to detect the truth. The original case was one of the largest ever for British police.

=== Literature ===
Literature constitutes a main part of Kirsten's life. It also reflects her interests, since she studies linguistics, specializing in phonology and dialects. This knowledge helps her find her attacker. Throughout the story, Kirsten remembers quotations from works of famous authors, with which she can identify, e.g. Yeats' "Long-Legged Fly" or Coleridge's ode "Dejection". Furthermore the fate of Martha Browne - Thomas Hardy: "Far from the madding crowd" causes Kirsten to use Martha Browne as her alias.

=== Personalities ===
Kirsten represses the attack, a psychological defence mechanism. But her attitude towards the attack changes: she develops a desire for killing her attacker. This desire is reinforced by her therapist who tells her that feelings of hatred might help her recover. Another significant aspect is that Kirsten learns that she is a "born victim" which - in her interpretation - means that she has survived for a reason. Quite logically, she concludes that it is her destiny to kill the attacker. Moreover, she considers the other victims her guiding angels, and from now on it becomes clear that she sees her mission as a holy one. Since she fears that the "Student Slasher" might get away with his deeds, she wants to punish him herself - in the name of the other killed girls. But she also wants to do self-justice to be able to continue living a peaceful life. All in all, Kirsten changes from the position of the victim into the position of a killer. The Kirsten before the attack is full of the joys of life: she enjoys literature, loves music prefers to be outdoors. Though she is happy and a bit naive, she has clear plans for her life—a future of some kind with her boyfriend Galen, as well as her ongoing education. Kirsten is a self-confident young woman, unafraid to walk through the park at night. She is clever and knows what she wants for herself. Kirsten feels at home in her body and realizes her effects on men. She has close friendships; a future without them seems impossible for her. Kirsten's relationship with her parents is positive. At the same time, she relishes her independence. After the attack her character changes considerably, a lot of things become different. First of all, since she cannot remember the attack, she suffers from nightmares and depressions. In her head there is a "dark cloud" which causes a death wish in her and ends in a suicide attempt which she survives. Through the dark cloud all her joy of life are stolen and she cannot interest herself in anything anymore, neither in literature nor in music. Only nature becomes a kind of hideaway for her again. Since her body is destroyed, she even considers herself ugly. She hates being touched and is not interested in her looks in anymore; she only uses make-up to disguise. What is more, is that she loses her friends and even Galen because she does not trust anybody anymore except of her doctor and Sarah, but she even lies to these persons. She splits up with Galen, because she knows she can't satisfy him. Her relationship with her parents also changes, Kirsten hates living with them and lies to them. Kirsten starts to kill after the attack. The thought of revenge becomes so strong and so she becomes more and more cold- blooded. She feels guided by her spirits — the souls of the victims of her attacker — and believes in superstition, which supports her "mission". In the end, the thought of fulfilling her destiny overwhelms all other feelings in her and the urge of making the dark cloud disappear makes her stick at nothing.

=== Greg Eastcote ===
Greg Eastcotes's abuse of women is a perversion of the Cædmon-story with which he is compared. He, like Cædmon is impotent. Although he keeps a tidy house, his inner house, his character, is disturbed. It is clear, when "Susan" discovers his collection of the victims' ringlets, that he is the villain Kirsten seeks.

=== Leitmotifs ===
There are some images that are always repeated in the story and which guide Kirsten on her mission. The first and most important of these leitmotifs is Kirsten's talisman, her paperweight. It has always played an important role for Kirsten, firstly she uses it for hypnotizing herself and to get deeper into her subconsciousness. Later it becomes a kind of talisman for her that guides her and with which she kills. In the end the paperweight becomes a symbol of Kirsten herself: she breaks free from her chains by letting it fall into the sea. The second image is one of the spirits guiding Kirsten. She believes more and more in superstition and thinks the lost souls of the attacker's victims guide her. Another important aspect are the places where Kirsten always hides and can get rid of all her feelings: nature and the box in St. Mary's church. Both of them are a kind of hideaway where she can forget all of her problems for a short time.
