= The Summer That Never Was =

2003 novel by Peter Robinson

- Author: Peter Robinson
- Language: English
- Series: Inspector Alan Banks, #13
- Genre: Crime novel
- Publisher: McClelland & Stewart (Canada); William Morrow (US); Hodder & Stoughton (UK)
- Publication date: January 2003
- Publication place: Canada
- Media type: Print (hardback, paperback)
- ISBN: 0-333-90743-4
- OCLC: 59464155
- Preceded by: Aftermath
- Followed by: Playing with Fire

The Summer That Never Was is the 13th novel by Canadian detective fiction writer Peter Robinson in the Inspector Banks series. It was published in 2003, and re-titled Close To Home in the US. It was nominated for the 2004 Anthony Award for 'Best Novel'.

== Reception ==
Gary Curtis of The Hamilton Spectator wrote that Robinson "delivers a taut, tense crime story", praising the "powerful" cast which "propels this good cracking yarn from start to finish". John North of the Times Colonist called the novel a "rich and rewarding tale, rife with pop music trivia of the '60s, that shows Robinson at the top of his writing form as he delivers both forensic and social justice in the framework of an entertainment and diverting novel." Paul Marck of the Edmonton Journal opined that Robinson "has the skill to make two parallel mysteries wind together nicely in a single volume" and that it "works superbly."
