= Piece of My Heart (novel) =

2006 novel by Peter Robinson

- Author: Peter Robinson
- Language: English
- Series: Inspector Alan Banks, #16
- Genre: Crime novel
- Publisher: Hodder & Stoughton
- Publication date: June 2006
- Publication place: Canada
- Media type: Print (hardback, paperback)
- ISBN: 0-340-83686-5
- OCLC: 64957652
- Preceded by: Strange Affair
- Followed by: Friend of the Devil

Piece of My Heart is the 16th novel by Canadian detective fiction writer Peter Robinson in the Inspector Banks series. It was published in 2006.

== Reception ==
Oline H. Cogdill of the South Florida Sun Sentinel called it an "thoughtful, intense novel that mixes a gripping plot with intense character studies" and a "highlight of 2006." Joanne Sasvari of the Calgary Herald stated: "Whatever small flaws there might be in Piece of My Heart, it is still among the best books in the crime fiction genre. It is, indeed, the sort of crime novel that transcends its genre." Connie Ogle of the Miami Herald wrote: "Psychologically taut and carefully constructed, A Piece of My Heart reaffirms Robinson's ability to weave competing narratives into an entertaining whole."

== Television adaptation ==
The story was filmed as part of the DCI Banks series and first aired in the UK in two parts on February 17 and 24, 2014. The teleplay varies considerably from the storyline of the novel, and includes a different timeframe (the murder takes place in 1988), while the name of the band is changed to The Crystal Kiss.
