= Stu Strumwasser =

American novelist

- Born: March 25, 1966 (age 59); Queens, New York, United States
- Education: Cornell University
- Occupations: Author, investment banker
- Known for: His novel, The Organ Broker

Stu Strumwasser (born March 25, 1966) is an American novelist, entrepreneur and investment banker. His novel, The Organ Broker, is a depiction of the global black market for organs—a consequence of the organ shortage crisis in American and around the world—and establishes Strumwasser as a thought leader on the bioethical issues that he has written about for publications like Salon.com.

== Early life and education ==
Strumwasser was born on the 25 March, 1966 in Queens, New York and raised in Lynbrook, New York. He is a graduate of Cornell University where he studied Marketing/Advertising and Creative Writing.

== The Novels ==
Strumwasser writes thrillers with underlying socio-political themes.

His first novel, A METAL SKY, was a coming of age story combined with an exposé of fundraisers for police unions.

THE ORGAN BROKER, a novel about a black market organ broker, will be released by the Arcade Imprint of Skyhorse Publishing in May 2015. While the book is a novel, the author has developed a secondary agenda of advocating for those in need of organ donations. In the Salon.com article, published in march of 2013, he said, "The tragic aspect of this particular shortage is that there are plenty of organs and there are things we can do." Strumwasser calls on Congress to enact more modern legislation related to the issue of organ transplantation.

In his next book, THE AMERICAN PARTY, Strumwasser takes on broken government and the unfolding oligarchy being created by the two major political parties.

== Career ==
=== Wall Street ===
Strumwasser worked on Wall St. from 1990 until 2005 in the area of wealth management, serving as a VP and Director at major firms including Paine Webber (now UBS) and Oppenheimer & Co.

=== Channeling Owen ===
For most of the time that Strumwasser worked on Wall Street he concurrently pursued a career as an aspiring novelist and also as the primary songwriter and drummer in the indie rock band Channeling Owen. In a feature article in Forbes ASAP (a 90s technology supplement to Forbes) freelance journalist David Freedman noted that, "Stu Strumwasser, Channeling Owen's drummer, principal songwriter, and administrator..." was, "obsessed with making it in rock and roll since he was 6." Freedman's article contrasted the release of a new record by Strumwasser's indie rock band and MCA recording artist Blink-182 in a changing landscape for the music business.

In 1999 the band was referred to by Electronic Sonic Press as, "… next in the great lineage of soul-searching groups such as Live, Collective Soul, and Creed, not to mention Jars of Clay." Heard magazine called the band's first full-length release, Small-minded Voodoo Theories, "well executed, displaying both great production techniques and a flair for solid songwriting," and Modernrock.com referenced Strumwasser's songwriting as, "full of historical references, poetic metaphors, and literary allusions." On 1/12/00, the band's song, "Scared Of me," was featured in the Dawson's Creek episode "Barefoot at Capefest" on the WB network. Yet, the band did not succeed in becoming a profitable venture and eventually broke up in 2003.

=== Snow Beverages ===
In late 2005, Struumwasser left Wall Street to found Snow Beverages, makers of natural soda.

Strumwasser has been a vegetarian since the age of 14, and was determined to manufacture and distribute a natural alternative to commercial and unhealthy soda. In December 2005, with the brand merely a few months old, the Wall Street Journal referenced it as one of the new natural sodas with "catchy names such as Fizzy Lizzy, GUS, Steaze, IZZE, or Snow..." Launched initially as a single-flavor natural mint soda, Snow evolved in 2007 to add a, "few new additions to the fizzy family" and in 2010, Snow, "dropped mint and launched three familiar flavors." However, despite meaningful distribution, the product line struggled to find an audience with consumers. In 2011, Strumwasser left the company which soon after ceased operations.

=== Tengrade ===
In 2011, Strumwasser founded a new company, Tengrade, the social rating tool, designed to enable users to get, or give, Real Opinions, on anything, from friends and people like them, directly on Facebook or Twitter. Fox Business Channel called Tengrade, "A new, one-stop rating tool for everything from cars and restaurants to hotels and pizza." Green Circle Capital: Concurrent to creating Tengrade Strumwasser also returned to Wall Street, but in a different capacity. Armed with the experience of having been an entrepreneur he aimed to assist other early-stage companies with raising capital, which he now does as Senior managing director of Green Circle.
