= Michael J. McCann =

Canadian author

- Born: 1955 (age 70–71); Peterborough, Ontario, Canada
- Education: Queen's University
- Occupation: Author
- Spouse: Lynn L. Clark
- Writing career
- Genres: crime fiction, supernatural fiction
- Website: www.mjmccann.com

Michael James McCann (born 1955) is a Canadian author of crime fiction and supernatural fiction. His crime novel Sorrow Lake, the first March and Walker Crime Novel, was a finalist for the 2015 Hammett Prize. He is also the author of the Donaghue and Stainer Crime Novel series and The Ghost Man, a supernatural thriller. He is a member of the Crime Writers of Canada.

== Biography ==
McCann was born and raised in Peterborough, Ontario, where he attended Trent University and earned a Bachelor of Arts (Honours) with a major in English literature. He then attended Queen's University in Kingston, Ontario, with an Ontario Graduate Scholarship, where he earned a Master of Arts in English. His M.A. thesis was entitled Symbolic Imagery in the Fiction of Sherwood Anderson.

McCann worked at the western office of Carswell Legal Publications in Calgary, Alberta, where he was production editor of Criminal Reports (Third Series) and western law reports coordinator. He later worked for Canada Customs, now known as the Canada Border Services Agency, as a training specialist, a project officer, and a manager of national customs programs.

McCann has reviewed with New York Journal of Books since 2016.

== The Ghost Man (2009; 2013) ==
McCann's first novel, The Ghost Man, is a supernatural thriller set in the fictional town of Coburn Falls on the Rideau Canal Waterway in eastern Ontario. A ghost story written on the suggestion of his son, Tim McCann, it tells the story of Simon Guthrie, a passive medium who unwillingly assists departed souls in their crossing to the next world. According to reviewer Clayton Bye, writing in The Deepening World of Fiction, "Michael McCann’s novel is uniquely his own. His ghosts, for example, don’t play. They can be seen, if they want to be; will damage your home if you don’t pay attention; and kill you if you get in the way. And his demon? McCann creates a truly scary adversary who isn’t going to lose what he’s after without leaving a slew of casualties as he passes through Simon Guthrie’s life." The Ghost Man was reissued under the imprint of The Plaid Raccoon Press in a revised edition on 2-13-13.

== Blood Passage (2011) ==
McCann's next novel, Blood Passage, marked his entry into the crime fiction genre and his first installment of The Donaghue and Stainer Crime Novel series. Inspired by the work of Dr. Jim B. Tucker of the University of Virginia, it tells the story of a four-year-old cold case into which homicide Lieutenant Hank Donaghue and Detective Karen Stainer are drawn when a three-and-a-half-year-old boy begins to recall alleged memories of his previous life as the murder victim, who was his mother's cousin. Set in the fictional city of Glendale, Maryland, this story features an unusual pairing in Hank Donaghue, the wealthy son of a retired State's Attorney, and Karen Stainer, the daughter of a Texas state trooper.

== Marcie's Murder (2012) ==
The second book in the Donaghue and Stainer Crime Novel series, Marcie's Murder finds Lt. Hank Donaghue on vacation. He stops overnight in the small town of Harmony, VA and is wrongly accused of the murder of a local woman. When he's allowed to make a phone call, he calls the one person he knows can help him out of this mess: Detective Karen Stainer.

== The Fregoli Delusion (2012) ==
In the third book in the Donaghue and Stainer Crime Novel series, a billionaire is murdered on a bike path and the only eyewitness suffers from a rare psychotic disorder that renders his testimony useless. While Lt. Donaghue directs the investigation toward Glendale's wealthiest citizens, several of whom may have a motive for murder, Karen Stainer stubbornly insists that their eyewitness is reliable after all and has already told them the identity of the killer.

== The Rainy Day Killer (2013) ==
The fourth book in the Donaghue and Stainer Crime Novel series. A serial killer known as the Rainy Day Killer turns up in Glendale. Wearing a business suit and carrying an umbrella, he abducts unsuspecting women when it rains, holding them captive for several days before brutally murdering them and dumping their bodies in plain sight. Assisted by FBI profiler Ed Griffin, Lt. Donaghue leads the investigation, while Detective Karen Stainer is reluctantly distracted by plans for her upcoming wedding.

== Sorrow Lake (2015) ==
The first book in the March and Walker Crime Novel series. Detective Inspector Ellie March of the Ontario Provincial Police is called in to investigate when a man from the village of Sparrow Lake is found shot to death, execution style, in a farmer's field in rural eastern Ontario. Leading an inexperienced team of detectives, she probes beneath the wintry surface of the township to discover the victim had a dark secret—one that may endanger others in the community as well. For young and enthusiastic Detective Constable Kevin Walker, the chance to work with Ellie March is an honour, until the situation turns ugly and unexpected betrayal threatens to destroy his promising career.

== Short stories ==
McCann has published a number of short stories in literary periodicals and in electronic format. In the late 1980s he concentrated on literary fiction, and his published stories included "Sandra," which appeared in Event, published by Douglas College, "The Levitator," published by The Fiddlehead, and "Pieces of Eight," which appeared in Quarry.

== Bibliography ==
=== Novels ===
- The Ghost Man, 2009
- Blood Passage, 2011
- Marcie's Murder, 2012
- The Fregoli Delusion, 2012
- The Rainy Day Killer, 2013
- Sorrow Lake, 2015

=== Short stories ===
- "Sandra," Event, Fall 1987, Vol. 16, No. 3, 43–50.
- "The Levitator", The Fiddlehead, Summer 1988, No. 156, 73–79.
- "Pieces of Eight", Quarry, Summer 1989, Vol. 38, No. 3, 68–77.
