= Jedediah Berry =

American writer

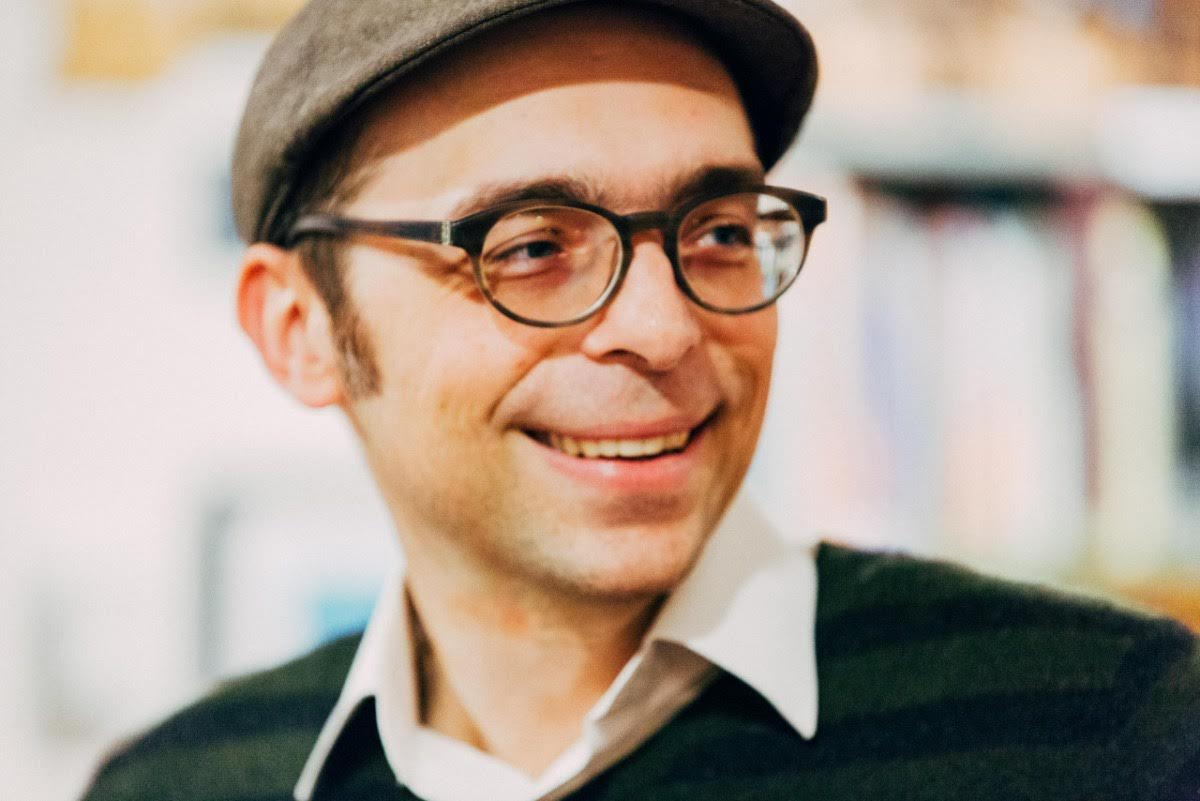
- Born: 1977 (age 48–49); Randolph, Vermont, U.S.
- Education: Bard College (BA); University of Massachusetts Amherst (MFA)
- Occupations: Writer, editor
- Partner: Emily Houk
- Awards: Hammett Prize (2009); Crawford Award (2010)
- Website: thirdarchive.net

Jedediah Berry (born 1977) is an American writer and editor. He is the author of The Manual of Detection, The Naming Song, and Kill All Wizards. His short stories have appeared in Conjunctions, Chicago Review, Ninth Letter, and elsewhere.

== Background and education ==
Berry was born in Randolph, Vermont, and spent his childhood in Catskill, New York. He attended Bard College, and earned a graduate degree from the MFA Program for Poets & Writers at the University of Massachusetts Amherst.

He has worked as an editor at Small Beer Press.

== Career ==
Berry's first novel, The Manual of Detection, was published by The Penguin Press in 2009. It won the 2009 Hammett Prize and the 2010 Crawford Award. It was a finalist for the 2010 Young Lions Fiction Award. Set in an unnamed city, the novel follows file clerk Charles Unwin as he attempts to solve a mystery involving a missing detective and a criminal mastermind operating through people's dreams. Critics have noted that The Manual of Detection combines elements from several genres of fiction, including mystery and fantasy. Writing for The Guardian, Michael Moorcock situated the book within the tradition of steampunk fiction. The New Yorker called it “the kind of mannered fantasy that might result if Wes Anderson were to adapt Kafka.” A reviewer for The Observer compared it to The Third Policeman by Flann O'Brien, and described it as “imaginative, fantastical, sometimes inexplicable, labyrinthine and ingenious.” An abridged version of the novel, read by Toby Jones, was broadcast on BBC Radio 4 Extra in January 2013.

In 2015, Berry published The Family Arcana: A Story in Cards, illustrated by Eben Kling, through Ninepin Press. Described as "a story published as a series of passages printed on a deck of playing cards, which can be arranged however a reader chooses." It was a finalist for the 2016 World Fantasy Award Special Award—Non-Professional.

Berry’s second novel, The Naming Song, was published by Tor Books in 2024. The book won the 2025 Massachusetts Book Award for Fiction and was a finalist for the 2024 Los Angeles Times Book Prize in Science Fiction, Fantasy, and Speculative Fiction. It was shortlisted for the 2026 Grand prix de l'Imaginaire, honoring the best speculative fiction published in France in 2025.

He currently teaches at the MFA Program for Poets & Writers at the University of Massachusetts Amherst. He has previously taught at Bard College. With his partner, writer Emily Houk, he runs the independent publisher Ninepin Press.

His newest book, Kill All Wizards, is the first of two novels in The Barbaric Ledgers series. It was published by Tordotcom on June 16, 2026. In his review for Reactor, Tobias Carroll called the book, "a departure from Berry’s previous work in many ways, but it is also recognizable as the work of the same author...Kill All Wizards shows that visceral action and grand ideas can comfortably coexist."

== Published works ==
=== Novels ===
- The Manual of Detection. Penguin Books. 2010. ISBN 9780143116516.
- The Naming Song. Tor Books. 2024. ISBN 9781250907981.
- The Barbaric Ledgers series:
  - Kill All Wizards. Tordotcom. 2026. ISBN 9781250908056.

=== Other works ===
- The Family Arcana: A Story in Cards. Ninepin Press. 2015. ISBN 9780996422000.

=== Short stories ===
- "Seven Stories", Conjunctions (2012)
- "A Window or a Small Box", Reactor/Tor.com (2013)
- "Hansel, Gretel, Grendel" (co-author Emily Houk), Conjunctions (2016)
