= Love Life (British TV series) =

- Genre: Comedy drama; Romance
- Written by: Bill Gallagher
- Directed by: Dominic Leclerc
- Starring: Robert James-Collier; Andrea Lowe; Sophie Thompson
- Country of origin: United Kingdom
- Original language: English
- No. of seasons: 1
- No. of episodes: 3

Original release
- Network: ITV
- Release: March 15 – March 29, 2012

Love Life is a British drama television miniseries that was shown on ITV.

== Cast ==
- Robert James-Collier as Joe
- Sophie Thompson as Penny
- Andrea Lowe as Lucy
- Kieran O'Brien as Dez
- Alexander Armstrong as Dominic
- Gregor Fisher as Will
- Dylan Tomkins as Bobby

== Episodes ==
=== Episode 1 ===
- Air date - 15 March 2012

Joe (Rob James-Collier) returns from his latest trip abroad to find that ex-girlfriend Lucy (Andrea Lowe), is pregnant. The baby's father is her boss Dominic (Alexander Armstrong), who is married to Penny (Sophie Thompson). Penny wants a child but does not have one. When Penny knows that her husband has a baby with Lucy, she is upset but she wants Lucy to have the baby.

=== Episode 2 ===
- Air date - 22 March 2012

Lucy leaves hospital with her baby, Arthur, but the bailiffs have taken everything from Will's flat so Joe installs them in a caravan belonging to his brother Dez. Penny, noticing Dom's odd behaviour, follows him and sees him holding Arthur and he eventually admits that he is the father, which upsets Penny so much that she crashes her car. Due to the circumstances Lucy has found herself in, Penny decides to sue for custody of Arthur. Joe meets with Alex, who is off on her travels again and invites him to go with her. However he goes to see Lucy at the caravan where they argue. After Joe has left Dom arrives and asks Lucy to hand the baby over to him

=== Episode 3 ===
- Air date - 29 March 2012

Penny prepares to fight for Arthur's custody as Joe tells Lucy he is off to Argentina with Alex. Penny, fearing that Lucy will run off with Dom and the baby, confronts her and Liz, in an attempt to break them up finds herself injured. Despite this Liz persuades Penny to give up her claim and be glad of what she and Dom have. After Will accuses Dom of abandoning his daughter Dom gives him money to pay for accommodation for Lucy and Will gambles it on a horse but wins big time and goes to Dom's shop to return his stake. He then meets Penny and the two of them argue leading to Will being taken to the hospital. Everyone then begins to reconsider the anger between them.

== Critical reception ==
The show received a rating of 6.8 on IMDb pulling from 75 reviews.
