= The Manual of Detection =

2009 novel by Jedediah Berry

- Author: Jedediah Berry
- Publication date: 2009
- ISBN: 978-0-143-11651-6

The Manual of Detection is a 2009 novel by American writer Jedediah Berry. Berry's debut novel, it is set in an unnamed city and blends elements of pulp detective fiction, fantasy, steampunk, and surrealism. The narrative follows Charles Unwin, a clerk at a powerful detective agency who is unexpectedly promoted to detective after the disappearance of a celebrated investigator.

== Plot ==
Charles Unwin works as a records clerk at a vast detective agency in a rainy, unnamed city. His job consists of filing reports written by the agency's celebrity detective, Travis Sivart. When Sivart disappears, Unwin is abruptly promoted to detective and assigned to investigate the case.

Ill-prepared for the role, he relies heavily on The Manual of Detection, the agency's authoritative guidebook on investigative methods, as well as on his narcoleptic assistant, Emily Doppel. During the investigation, Unwin encounters several mysterious figures from Sivart's previous cases, including Cleopatra Greenwood, an enigmatic nightclub singer; Jasper and Josiah Rook, a pair of former conjoined twins; and Enoch Hoffman, a biloquist capable of imitating thousands of voices.

As Unwin pursues the case, strange phenomena relating to sleep begin to spread through the city: alarm clocks disappear and citizens begin sleepwalking in large droves. Unwin gradually uncovers evidence that Sivart's celebrated past cases may have been solved incorrectly and is led to a conspiracy involving crimes committed through people's dreams.

== Reception ==
The Manual of Detection received generally positive reviews. The New Yorker described the novel as "the kind of mannered fantasy that might result if Wes Anderson were to adapt Kafka." Reviewers also compared Berry's work to Jorge Luis Borges, Jasper Fforde, and Flann O'Brien. Michael Moorcock compared it to other steampunk novels, describing how it "looks ironically at [steampunk's] own roots, tropes and cliches" and that Berry "has an ear well tuned to the styles of the detective story, and can reproduce atmosphere with loving skill".

The novel won the 2009 Hammett Prize and the 2010 Crawford Award. It was a finalist for the 2010 Young Lions Fiction Award.

In 2013, British actor Toby Jones read an abridged version of the book for BBC Radio 4 Extra.
