= The Price of Love (disambiguation) =

"The Price of Love" is a 1965 song by The Everly Brothers, covered by Bryan Ferry.

The Price of Love may also refer to:

- "The Price of Love", a song on Roger Daltrey's 1987 solo album Can't Wait to See the Movie
- The Price of Love (1955 film), a French drama film
- The Price of Love (1995 film), a made-for-television film
- The Price of Love (short story collection), a 2009 short story collection by Peter Robinson
- "The Price of Love", a song on White Lies's 2009 album To Lose My Life...
- The Price of Love a 1914 novel by Arnold Bennett
