= Children of the Revolution (novel) =

2013 Inspector Banks novel by Peter Robinson

- Author: Peter Robinson
- Language: English
- Series: Inspector Alan Banks, #21
- Genre: Crime novel
- Publisher: Hodder & Stoughton (UK); McClelland & Stewart (Canada)
- Publication date: 2013
- Publication place: Canada
- Media type: Print (hardback, paperback)
- ISBN: 9780062240507
- OCLC: 849641499
- Preceded by: Watching the Dark
- Followed by: Abattoir Blues

Children of the Revolution, published in 2013, is the 21st novel by Canadian detective fiction writer Peter Robinson in the Inspector Banks series of novels set in Yorkshire.

The plot concerns a college lecturer, Gavin Miller, found dead on a railway line with £5,000 still in his pocket.

== Reception ==
Tracy Sherlock of the Vancouver Sun opined that fans "will not be disappointed" and that the novel "shows Banks as both a vulnerable and infallible human and as a brilliant, instinctive investigator." Jack Batten of the Toronto Star wrote that Robinson "does a brilliant job with these conversations, gradually separating the dodgy liars from the honest truth-speakers and nudging the story toward a solution that is both logical and tantalizing." Peter Robb of the Ottawa Citizen wrote that while the novel is "worth reading", he had "liked other volumes better than this one."
