= Cold Is the Grave =

2000 crime novel by Peter Robinson

- First edition
- Author: Peter Robinson
- Language: English
- Series: Inspector Alan Banks, #11
- Genre: Crime novel
- Publisher: Viking Press
- Publication date: 2000
- Publication place: Canada
- Media type: Print (Hardback), (Paperback)
- ISBN: 0-330-48216-5
- OCLC: 48884116
- Preceded by: In a Dry Season
- Followed by: Aftermath

Cold Is the Grave is the 11th novel by Anglo-Canadian detective fiction writer Peter Robinson in the Inspector Banks series, published in 2000. It won the 2001 Arthur Ellis Award for Best Crime Novel, and the Danish Palle Rosenkrantz Award.

== Adaptation ==
In 2011, an episode of the ITV series DCI Banks, that was based on the events in Cold is the Grave, was broadcast. The series has Stephen Tompkinson as its lead actor in the Banks role.
