= A Necessary End =

1989 crime novel by Peter Robinson

- First edition
- Author: Peter Robinson
- Language: English
- Series: Inspector Alan Banks, #3
- Genre: Crime novel
- Publisher: Viking Press
- Publication date: 1989
- Publication place: Canada
- Media type: Print (Hardback), (Paperback)
- ISBN: 0-330-49163-6
- OCLC: 49906721
- Preceded by: A Dedicated Man
- Followed by: The Hanging Valley

A Necessary End is the third novel by Canadian detective fiction writer Peter Robinson in the Inspector Banks series. It was published in 1989, and reprinted a number of times since.
