= Gallows View =

1987 crime novel by Peter Robinson

- First edition (Canada)
- Author: Peter Robinson
- Language: English
- Series: Inspector Alan Banks, #1
- Genre: Crime novel
- Publisher: Viking Press (Canada); Scribners (US)
- Publication date: 1987
- Publication place: Canada
- Media type: Print (hardback & paperback)
- Followed by: A Dedicated Man

Gallows View is the first novel by Canadian detective fiction writer Peter Robinson in the Inspector Banks series of novels. The novel was first printed in 1987, but has been reprinted a number of times since.

== Plot ==
A Peeping Tom is frightening the women of Eastvale; two glue-sniffing young thugs are breaking into homes and robbing people; an old woman may or may not have been murdered. Investigating these cases is Detective Chief Inspector Alan Banks, a policeman recently moved to the Yorkshire Dales from London to escape the stress of city life. Banks also has to deal with the local feminists and his attraction to a young psychologist, Jenny Fuller.
