= The Price of Love (short story collection) =

2009 crime anthology by Peter Robinson

- First edition (Canada)
- Author: Peter Robinson
- Language: English
- Genre: Short story collection
- Publisher: McClelland & Stewart (Canada); Hodder & Stoughton (UK); William Morrow (US)
- Publication date: 2009
- Publication place: Canada
- Media type: Print (hardcover)
- Pages: 338
- ISBN: 978-0-340-91951-4

The Price of Love (2009) is the second collection of short stories by Canadian detective fiction writer Peter Robinson, the author of the Inspector Banks series.

The book collects eleven stories previously published in crime anthologies and magazines, including an Inspector Banks novella and three Inspector Banks short stories. The book is subtitled "Eleven ways to pay with your life".

The stories are set in Yorkshire, London, Canada (often Toronto) or the United States. Several involve miscarriages of justice: either an innocent person convicted or no-one convicted. Those from anthologies often involve a theme specified by the editor, which is given below if stated by Robinson in the afternotes to the collection. The year of original publication is given in brackets.

Two stories in Not Safe After Dark set in wartime (1940s) Yorkshire involved Frank Bascombe, a "special constable in the war". Cornelius Jubb was intended as the third; it refers to "Constable Bascombe", although Robinson could not use the full name "Frank Bascombe" in the collection for copyright reasons; see afterword to collection.

== Contents ==
- Cornelius Jubb (2004). An American coloured GI from Louisiana in Leeds, Yorkshire in World War II. Reflects historical research for In a Dry Season.
- The Magic of Your Touch (2004). Theme is music, and one of Robinson’s favourites. A bar musician hears (and borrows) a tune, which gets into his head.
- The Eastvale Ladies' Poker Circle (2007). Theme is poker: an Inspector Banks story, set among rich women in a chic part of Eastvale, and the murder of a husband.
- The Ferryman's Beautiful Daughter (2006). had a song written for the anthology as well. Set in an American city on an island, and the death of a daughter.
- Walking the Dog (2008). Written for anthology Toronto Noir, set in "The Beaches" part of Toronto where Robinson lives. A husband and wife both want to end their marriage, and both are murdered.
- Blue Christmas: an Inspector Banks story (2005). Written for friends of is American publisher, Crippen & Landru; an Inspector Banks story without a murder. He talks to an unhappy wife at Christmas when expert help is not available.
- Shadow on the Water (2003). Written for an anthology Men from Boys. The story is about childhood betrayal, recollections in a Western Front trench before Passchendaele.
- The Cherub Affair (2003). About a Toronto "private eye", published as a seven-part serial in a newspaper, with an eighth part which was pruned for space reasons. Lang PI does not usually handle murders, but the suspect’s sister thinks the police are wrong. Originally a novel Beginner’s Luck which was put in his bottom drawer when the first two DI Banks novels were published, he dusted it off when the Toronto Star requested a story they could serialise over a week. It has a minor "cliffhanger" ending each episode. He had to dump subplots, minor characters and background.
- The Price of Love (2008). Written for an anthology about the "burden of the badge", a policeman’s lot. A boy finds a Metropolitan Police badge in the sand at Blackpool, and a police murderer is arrested.
- Birthday Dance (2005). Theme is the Bible. A little girl recalls her parents party, when she asked for Uncle John’s head.
- Like a Virgin: a new Inspector Banks story written for this collection (2009). Twenty-plus years later Banks recalls summer 1985 in London, and the murder of a Soho call girl. DI Banks is on West Central Murder Squad, and thinking of taking a DCI position in Eastvale, North Yorkshire as he feels the need to get away from London. Things are cool at home with Sandra, and he is seeing Linda, a policewoman. Another character is DS Burgess of Special Branch, "Dirty Dick", who returns in other stories.
