= All the Colours of Darkness =

Novel by Peter Robinson

- Author: Peter Robinson
- Language: English
- Series: Inspector Alan Banks, #18
- Genre: Crime novel
- Publisher: Hodder & Stoughton (UK); McClelland & Stewart (US & Canada)
- Publication date: August 2008
- Publication place: Canada
- Media type: Print (hardback, paperback)
- ISBN: 978-0340836941
- Preceded by: Friend of the Devil
- Followed by: Bad Boy

All the Colours of Darkness is the 18th novel by English detective fiction writer Peter Robinson in the Inspector Banks series. It was published in 2008.

== Reception ==
Robert Wiersema of the Edmonton Journal wrote that Robinson "manages to simultaneously focus on the most intimate of crimes, a murder-suicide, and to incorporate a vivid and thought-provoking geo-political twist." Barry Forshaw of The Independent opined that Robinson "has a way of undercutting the genre's familiarity" and praised the plotting. Ken Kilpatrick of Waterloo Region Record called it "well written with terrific characters and a plot that keeps on surprising."
