= When the Music's Over (novel) =

2016 crime novel by Peter Robinson

When the Music's Over here
- First edition (UK)
- Author: Peter Robinson
- Language: English
- Series: Inspector Alan Banks, #23
- Genre: Crime novel
- Publisher: McClelland & Stewart (Canada); Hodder & Stoughton (UK); William Morrow (US)
- Publication date: July 2016
- Publication place: Canada
- Media type: Print (hardback, paperback)
- ISBN: 978-1-444-78671-2
- Preceded by: Abattoir Blues
- Followed by: Sleeping in the Ground

When the Music's Over is the 23rd novel by Canadian detective fiction writer Peter Robinson in the Inspector Banks series, published in 2016.

== Plot ==
Alan Banks is newly promoted to Detective Superintendent. There are two investigations in the book, one is investigated by DI Annie Cabbot although Banks is the SIO on paper. He has three female assistants.

At an important meeting called by the chief constable (and attended by the new Police and Crime Commissioner) Banks is told that he is to be in charge of a "historical sexual abuse" investigation, along with an old (now) friend Richard (Dirty Dick) Burgess from the NCA (the National Crime Agency; the British FBI. It is similar to the Jimmy Savile and Rolf Harris cases, and part of Operation Yewtree.

He is to investigate Danny Caxton who was a crooner in the late fifties then a popular (and sexy) television host and celebrity entertainer in the sixties to the eighties and early nineties. Caxton is accused of the rape of Linda Palmer, then fourteen, in the summer of 1967 at Blackpool. One of seven similar complaints against Caxton, here there was a rape witness (and reluctant participant), Tony Monaghan. But Monaghan, an assistant to Caxton, turns out to have been murdered two months later in suspicious circumstances and his body is discovered in public toilets known at the time to be frequented by gay men. The case files of the death have disappeared, and the Chief Constable at the time, who was a friend of Caxton, was dismissed in a drug-related corruption scandal some years later. During an interview with Caxton with his lawyer present Caxton has a stroke, which Banks is the first to notice and calls for paramedics. Later Banks says there will be "repercussions" and demands for a "pound of flesh", but says "demotion wouldn't bother me too much. (Promotion to) Chief Constable I'm not so sure about". Caxton was eighty-five, and was not following his doctor's advice as it would interfere with his sex life. He has two more strokes, one on the way to hospital and a third there, so if he survives he will be "bedridden and incapacitated". Banks says the CPS will declare him "unfit to stand".

DI Annie Cabbot is investigating the death of a teenage girl; her battered naked body was found on a country road, and she turns out to be fifteen. The team discovers she was dropped off after intercourse and then beaten to death by someone from a second vehicle. Eventually a friend of her brother confesses to picking her up and beating her to death; he did not like her consorting with "Pakis" (Pakistanis) who have been "grooming" and paying her. They will be charged with rape, sex with a child and sexual assault. There is DNA evidence, and she is under-age. Banks says "Something's sure to stick", so her case ends in finality. It is similar to the Rotherham child sexual exploitation scandal.
