= Margaret Verble =

American author

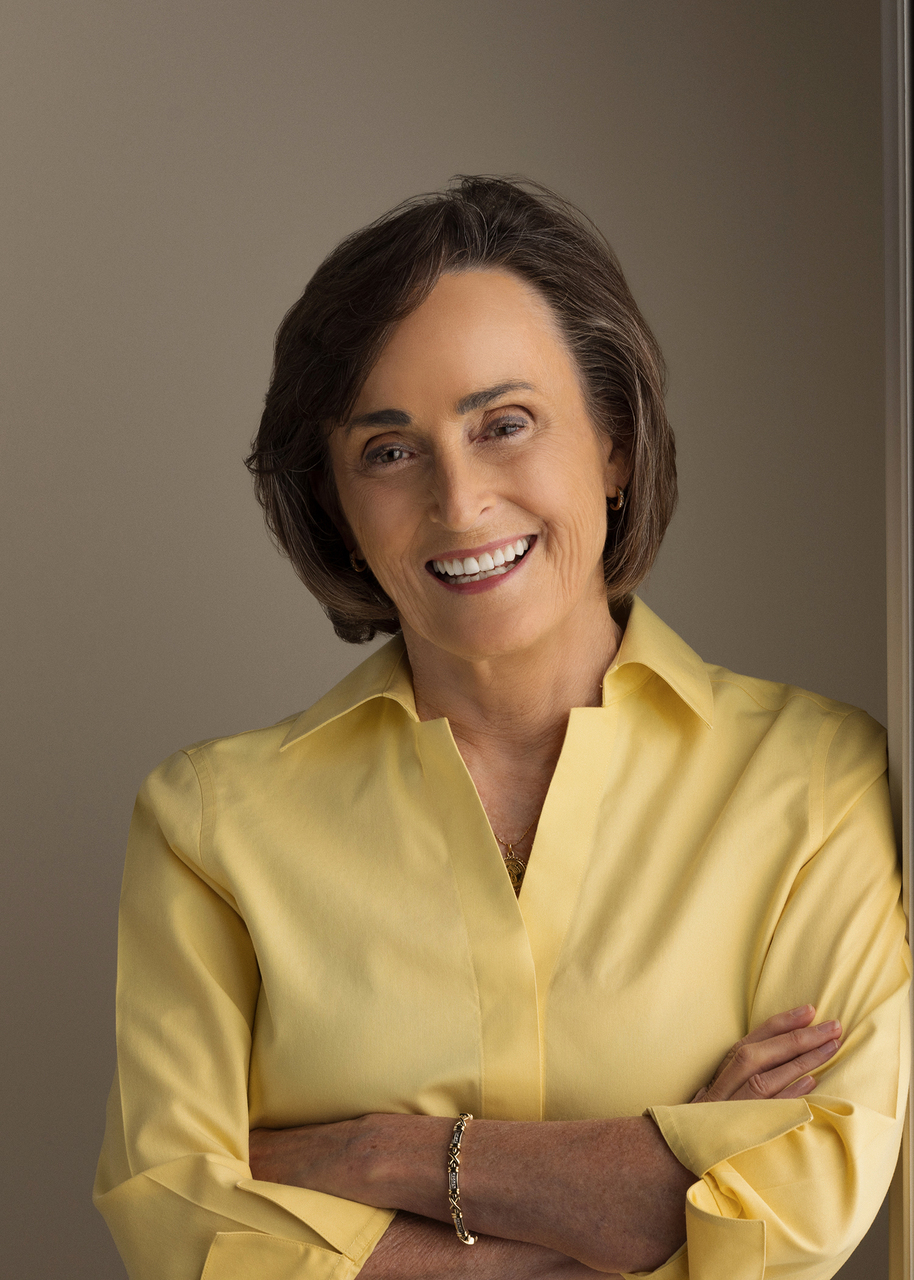
- Margaret Verble in 2022
- Born: Greenville, KY, U.S.
- Citizenship: Cherokee Nation, American
- Education: University of Kentucky (BA, MA, EdD)
- Notable work: Maud's Line
- Website: margaretverble.com

Margaret Verble is a Native American author and member of the Cherokee Nation of Oklahoma. Her book Maud's Line was a finalist for the 2016 Pulitzer Prize for Fiction.

== Early life and education ==
Verble was born in Greenville, KY, but grew up in Nashville, Tennessee. She earned her Bachelor of Arts degree, Master's degree, and Ed.D. from the University of Kentucky.

== Career ==
After earning her degrees, Verble moved to Lexington, Kentucky, to run a business. In 2015, her first novel Maud's Line was named a finalist for the 2016 Pulitzer Prize for Fiction. Maud's Line focuses on her Cherokee nation heritage during the 1920s through the lens of a fictional woman named Maud Nail. She later published a prequel to her first novel titled Cherokee America, set in 1875.

== Published Works ==
- Stealing (2023)
- When Two Feathers Fell from the Sky (2021)
- Cherokee America (2020)
- Maud's Line (2015)
