= Past Reason Hated =

1991 crime novel by Peter Robinson

- First edition
- Author: Peter Robinson
- Language: English
- Series: Inspector Alan Banks, #5
- Genre: Crime novel
- Publisher: Viking Press
- Publication date: 1991
- Publication place: Canada
- Media type: Print (hardback, paperback)
- ISBN: 0-330-49162-8
- OCLC: 50495235
- Preceded by: The Hanging Valley
- Followed by: Wednesday's Child

Past Reason Hated is the fifth novel by Canadian detective fiction writer Peter Robinson in the Inspector Banks series of novels. It was published in 1991, and won the 1992 Arthur Ellis Award for 'Best Novel'.

== Plot ==
The body of Caroline Hartley is found one evening before Christmas by her lover, Veronica Shildon. Detective Constable Susan Gay is the first detective at the scene. She has recently been promoted to C.I.D. and the case soon takes on overwhelming professional and personal importance for her. DC Gay and Chief Inspector Alan Banks soon find plenty of suspects as they begin to delve into Caroline’s past and the women’s present life: Veronica’s ex-husband, who is a well-known composer; a feminist poet; the cast and crew of a play Caroline was rehearsing; and Caroline’s eccentric, reclusive brother, Gary Hartley. Inspector Banks’s fifth case is an ironic, suspenseful tale of family secrets, hidden passions and desperate violence.
