= Inspector Alan Banks =

Fictional protagonist in a series of crime novels by Peter Robinson

Alan Banks
- First appearance: Gallows View
- Last appearance: Standing in the Shadows
- Created by: Peter Robinson
- Portrayed by: Stephen Tompkinson

In-universe information
- Gender: Male
- Title: Detective Inspector, Detective Chief Inspector, Detective Superintendent
- Occupation: Police Officer
- Nationality: British

Detective Superintendent Alan Banks (born 1958) is the fictional protagonist in a series of crime novels by Peter Robinson. From 2010 to 2016 several of the novels were adapted for television, and other original stories were produced, under the series title DCI Banks with Stephen Tompkinson in the lead role.

== Background ==
Most of the first dozen novels focused on crimes investigated by Banks. In the 1999 novel In a Dry Season, Banks and his wife, Sandra, are separated and eventually divorce. The character of Detective Sergeant (subsequently Detective Inspector) Annie Cabbot makes her first appearance as a member of Banks' team. Subsequent novels have a sub-plot about the on-off romance between Banks and Cabbot.

A colleague of Banks from his time in London, Detective Superintendent (later Chief Superintendent) Richard "Dirty Dick" Burgess, is another perennial character who appears in many of the novels. Initially hostile to Banks when they first met, they become good friends over time and have established a natural (if still slightly edgy) rapport by the early 21st century.

A detective inspector during his London period and a detective chief inspector in most of the books, Banks receives a promotion to detective superintendent at the time of When the Music's Over.

== Awards ==
The Banks novels have won and been shortlisted for prestigious awards in crime fiction, including the Arthur Ellis Award, the Anthony Award, and the Edgar Award.

== Adaptation ==
In July 2010, ITV commissioned a television adaptation of the novel Aftermath, with Stephen Tompkinson playing the role of Banks. The adaptation, filmed on location in Leeds, was broadcast as two one-hour episodes, airing on 27 September and 4 October 2010. The viewing figures were successful enough for three more adaptations to be commissioned – the novels Playing with Fire, Friend of the Devil and Cold Is the Grave – under a series title DCI Banks showing as six one-hour episodes, which started airing on 16 September 2011. A second series, consisting of three adaptations of the novels Strange Affair, Dry Bones That Scream and Innocent Graves, again produced as six one-hour episodes, began airing on 10 October 2012, and was followed by a third series, consisting of three adaptations of the novels Wednesday's Child, Piece of My Heart and Bad Boy, again produced as six one-hour episodes, began airing on 4 February 2014. The series went on for two more seasons, although these were not based on adaptations of Peter Robinson's novels, with the fourth season airing in 2015 and the fifth and final season airing in 2016.

== Novels ==
- Gallows View (1987)
- A Dedicated Man (1988)
- A Necessary End (1989)
- The Hanging Valley (1989)
- Past Reason Hated (1991)
- Wednesday's Child (1992)
- Dry Bones That Dream (1994) [US title is Final Account]
- Innocent Graves (1996)
- Dead Right (1997) [US title is Blood at the Root]
- In A Dry Season (1999)
- Cold Is the Grave (2000)
- Aftermath (2001)
- The Summer that Never Was (2003) [US title is Close to Home]
- Playing with Fire (2004)
- Strange Affair (2005)
- Piece of My Heart (2006)
- Friend of the Devil (2007)
- All the Colours of Darkness (2008)
- Bad Boy (2010)
- Watching the Dark (2012)
- Children of the Revolution (2013)
- Abattoir Blues (2014) [US title is In the Dark Places]
- When the Music's Over (2016)
- Sleeping in the Ground (2017)
- Careless Love (2018)
- Many Rivers to Cross (2019)
- Not Dark Yet (2021)
- Standing in the Shadows (2023)

=== Associated novels ===
- Caedmon's Song (1990)

=== Short story collections ===
- Not Safe After Dark (1998)
- The Price of Love (2009)
