= The Hanging Valley =

1989 crime novel by Peter Robinson

- First edition
- Author: Peter Robinson
- Language: English
- Series: Inspector Alan Banks, #4
- Genre: Crime novel
- Publisher: Viking Press
- Publication date: 1989
- Publication place: Canada
- Media type: Print (hardback, paperback)
- ISBN: 0-330-49164-4
- OCLC: 59501666
- Preceded by: A Necessary End
- Followed by: Past Reason Hated

The Hanging Valley is the fourth novel by Canadian detective fiction writer Peter Robinson in the Inspector Banks series.
