= Fizzy Lizzy =

American soft drink company

Fizzy Lizzy is an American carbonated juice drinks producer based in Manhattan, New York. The company was founded in 2000 by Elizabeth Morrill. It follows "a purist's approach: just juice, carbonated water and only the smallest amount of natural flavorings and 'filler' juices, like white grape juice." Starting with four flavors and local distribution, they now produce nine drinks and sell throughout the US.
