= A Dedicated Man =

1988 crime novel by Peter Robinson

- First edition
- Author: Peter Robinson
- Language: English
- Series: Inspector Alan Banks, #2
- Genre: Crime novel
- Published: 1988 (Viking Press)
- Publication place: Canada
- Media type: Print (hardback, paperback)
- ISBN: 0-330-49160-1
- OCLC: 50843668
- Preceded by: Gallows View
- Followed by: A Necessary End

A Dedicated Man is the second novel by Canadian detective fiction writer Peter Robinson in the Inspector Banks series of novels. The novel was first printed in 1988, but has been reprinted a number of times since.
