= Innocent Graves =

1996 crime novel by Peter Robinson

- First edition
- Author: Peter Robinson
- Language: English
- Series: Inspector Alan Banks, #8
- Genre: Crime novel
- Publisher: Viking Press
- Publication date: 1996
- Publication place: Canada
- Media type: Print (hardback, paperback)
- ISBN: 0-330-48218-1
- OCLC: 47037141
- Preceded by: Dry Bones That Dream
- Followed by: Dead Right

Innocent Graves is the eighth novel by Canadian detective fiction writer Peter Robinson in the Inspector Banks series of novels. The novel was first printed in 1996, but has been reprinted a number of times since. The novel was selected by Publishers Weekly as one of the best mysteries of the year, nominated for the 1996 Hammett Prize, and won the 1997 Arthur Ellis Award for 'Best Novel'.

== Original story ==
Robinson wrote a short story Innocence in 1990, about Terry Reed who was accused then cleared of the murder of a schoolgirl. Robinson next wrote an entire novel from Reed's point of view, which was turned down by his publisher. He then thought it might work better with DI Banks, and rewrote the novel as Innocent Graves with DI Banks and Reed as Owen. The short story Innocence was published in Not Safe After Dark (1998); see Introduction to the collection.

== Adaptation ==
In 2012, the novel was adapted as a two-part episode on the TV series DCI Banks.
