= Andrea Lowe =

British actress

- Born: 1 January 1975 (age 51); Arnold, Nottinghamshire, England, UK
- Education: Goldsmiths, University of London
- Occupation: Actress
- Partner: Terry Betts
- Children: 1

Andrea Lowe (born 1 January 1975) is an English TV, film, and theatre actress. Lowe got her first major role in the Harold Pinter play The Birthday Party at Sheffield's Crucible Theatre. She has played numerous roles on television, stage, and film. However, she is most known for her 5-year turn as Detective Sergeant Annie Cabbot in the ITV series DCI Banks (2011–2016).

== Early life ==
Lowe was born in Arnold, Nottinghamshire. She attended Redhill Comprehensive School, the Lesley Reason School of Dance in Gedling and the Carlton TV acting academy. She also performed with the theatre group, Acorn. Lowe later studied English and theatre in London at Goldsmiths College.

== Career ==
Lowe started her theatre career at Sheffield's Crucible Theatre in the play The Birthday Party by Harold Pinter.

In 1993, she had her first film role, alongside Samantha Morton, in the musical comedy drama The Token King, set in a high school in Nottingham. Among her extensive work since then, Lowe guest-starred in two episodes of the second season of The Tudors in which she played Lady Eleanor Luke, a fictional noblewoman who was briefly the mistress of Henry VIII, and played Vicky in the 2009 TV film, The Unloved.

Lowe played the role of Annie Cabbot for 5 years in the British television network ITV series DCI Banks (2011–2016), having also played the role in its pilot, DCI Banks: Aftermath (2010). Lowe was absent for much of the second season as she and her character were on maternity leave.

Lowe starred in Alan Ayckbourn's play How the Other Half Loves alongside Jenny Seagrove and Jason Merrells at the Duke of York's Theatre, the West End theatre, on St Martin's Lane, London in 2016. In 2023, she starred in Dixon and Daughters at the National Theatre.

== Filmography ==
=== Film ===
Year	Film	Role	Notes
2000	Threesome	Melanie	Short film
2000	Pandaemonium	Edith Southey	
2002	Club Le Monde	Sarah	
2004	The Rover's Return	Zoe	Short film
2004	Room to Let	Rebecca	Short film
2010	Route Irish	Rachel	
2011	Taking Life	Charlotte	Short film
2012	When the Lights Went Out	Rita	
2013	The Arbiter	Kate	
2014	I Don't Care	Ollie	Short film
2020	Joey	Annie	Short film
2024	Lollipop	Kim	
2025	To Love a Narcissist	Lucy	

=== Television ===
Year	Film	Role	Notes
1993	The Token King	Kim	Television film
2000	The Bill	Hayley Turner	Episode: "Soft Talking"
2000	Nature Boy	Claire Whitaker	Mini-series; episode 4
2000	Doctors	Jackie Dean	Episode: "Second Chance"
2000	The Sleeper	Donna Dawes	2-part television film
2001	Peak Practice	Zoë Thomson	Episode: "Suffer the Little Children"
2002	Night Flight	Margaret	Television film
2002	Rescue Me	Melanie Woods	6 episodes
2002	Fields of Gold	W.P.C.	Unknown episodes
2004	No Angels	Julia	Episode: #1.9
2004	A Thing Called Love	Liz Leech	5 episodes
2005	Love Soup	Tina	Episode: "The Reflecting Pool"
2006	The Bill	Leigh Bevan	Episodes: "High Flyers" & "Special Relationships"
2006	Murder City	Helen Osborn	Episode: "Death of a Ladies' Man"
2006	Where the Heart Is	Zoë Phelps	Series 10; 9 episodes
2006	Cracker	Elaine Archer	Special episode: "Nine Eleven"
2006–2007	The Innocence Project	Philippa Lucas	3 episodes
2007	Casualty	Lisa Barker	Episode: "The Silence of Friends"
2007	Hotel Babylon	Karen	Episode: #2.7
2007	New Tricks	Tina Murphy	Episode: "Buried Treasure"
2007	Agatha Christie's Marple	Maureen	Episode: "Ordeal by Innocence"
2007	Murphy's Law	DC Kim Goodall	Episodes: "Food Chain: Parts 1–3"
2008	Torchwood	Katie	Episode: "Fragments"
2008	The Bill	Paula Grant	Episode: "Blood Rush: Part 2"
2008	The Tudors	Lady Eleanor Luke	Episodes: "Checkmate" & "The Act of Succession"
2008	No Heroics	Vicci	Episode: "Supergroupie"
2008	Silent Witness	Emily Wright	Episodes: "Terror: Parts 1 & 2"
2009	Shameless	Zeta	Series 6; 3 episodes
2009	The Unloved	Vicky	Television film
2009	Coronation Street	Naomi Collins	2 episodes
2010	Accused	Donna Armstrong	Episode: "Kenny's Story"
2010–2016	DCI Banks	DS Annie Cabbot	Series 1–5; 27 episodes
2011	Monroe	Mrs. Chadwick	2 episodes
2012	Love Life	Lucy	Mini-series, 3 episodes
2014	Midsomer Murders	Ava Gould	Episode: "Let Us Prey"
2014	Inspector George Gently	Cherry Stretch	Episode: "Blue for Bluebird"
2014	Lewis	Philippa Garwood	Episodes: "The Lions of Nemea: Parts 1 & 2"
2016	Houdini & Doyle	Beatrice Upton	Mini-series; episode: "A Dish of Adharma"
2017	Trust Me	Ally Sutton	2 episodes
2018	Agatha Raisin	Eve Pembery	Episode: "The Wizard of Evesham"
2022	Endeavour	Pauline Lunn	Episode: "Scherzo"
2022	Sherwood	DI Taylor	Series 1; 6 episodes
2022	Without Sin	Bobbi Carter	Mini-series; 4 episodes
2023	Mrs Sidhu Investigates	Jade Turtle	Episode: "Killer App"
2026	Beyond Paradise	Helen Linder	Episode: #4.1

== Selected theatre work ==
- How The Other Half Loves (Duke of York's Theatre, West End, London)
- Bash (Citizens Theatre Glasgow)
- A Day in Dull Armour (Royal Court Theatre Upstairs)
- The Birthday Party (Crucible Theatre Sheffield)
- Lost and Found (River House Barn)
- Gong Donkeys (The Bush Theatre)
