= Wednesday's Child (novel) =

1992 crime novel by Peter Robinson

- First edition
- Author: Peter Robinson
- Language: English
- Series: Inspector Alan Banks, #6
- Genre: Crime novel
- Publisher: Viking Press
- Publication date: 1992
- Publication place: Canada
- Media type: Print (hardback, paperback)
- ISBN: 0-330-48219-X
- OCLC: 47150819
- Preceded by: Past Reason Hated
- Followed by: Dry Bones That Dream

Wednesday's Child is the sixth novel by Canadian detective fiction writer Peter Robinson in the Inspector Banks series. It was published in 1992, and reprinted a number of times since. It was the first of Robinson's novels to be shortlisted for the Edgar Award.
