= Strange Affair (novel) =

2005 novel by Peter Robinson

- Author: Peter Robinson
- Language: English
- Series: Inspector Alan Banks, #15
- Genre: Crime novel
- Publisher: McClelland & Stewart
- Publication date: January 2005
- Publication place: Canada
- Media type: Print (hardback, paperback)
- ISBN: 978-0-333-98934-0 (first edition, hardback)
- OCLC: 56806861
- Preceded by: Playing with Fire
- Followed by: Piece of My Heart

Strange Affair is the 15th novel in the Inspector Banks series by Canadian detective fiction writer Peter Robinson. It was published in 2005.

The title is derived from the song "Strange Affair" by Richard Thompson, and is mentioned twice in the novel. In an afterword, the author credits Victor Malarek's 2003 book The Natashas : inside the new global sex trade for informing the story.

== Reception ==
Paul Marck of the Edmonton Journal opined that the novel "never loses the thread of credibility" and that Robinson "never substitutes gimmicks, cheap gunplay or wild assumptions for superlative storytelling", which is what makes it "so good." Jenni Mortin of The StarPhoenix wrote that Robinson has "excelled himself with this one." Desiree Finhert of the Waterloo Region Record wrote that while the novel is "thoroughly researched", it is "not enough to create interest in this connect-the-dots storyline."
