= Bad Boy (novel) =

2010 novel by Peter Robinson

- Author: Peter Robinson
- Language: English
- Series: Inspector Alan Banks, #19
- Genre: Crime novel
- Publisher: Hodder & Stoughton (UK); McClelland & Stewart (Canada); William Morrow (US)
- Publication date: 2010
- Publication place: Canada
- Media type: Print (hardback, paperback)
- ISBN: 978-0340836972
- Preceded by: All the Colours of Darkness
- Followed by: Watching The Dark

Bad Boy is the 19th novel by Canadian detective fiction writer Peter Robinson in the Inspector Banks series.

== Reception ==
Cheryl Parker of the Ottawa Citizen wrote: "The story flags toward the end, requiring two chapters to explain the previous non-stop action. But otherwise it's a page-turner — the highest praise for crime fiction." Gary Curtis of The Hamilton Spectator "highly recommended" the novel, though criticized its characterisation of Banks. Catherine Ford of the Calgary Herald opined that while the novel is "well written and interesting", it "lacks a gripping narrative".
