= Playing with Fire (Robinson novel) =

2004 novel by Peter Robinson

Playing With Fire
- Author: Peter Robinson
- Language: English
- Series: Inspector Alan Banks, #14
- Genre: Crime novel
- Publisher: McClelland & Stewart
- Publication date: January 2004
- Publication place: Canada
- Media type: Print (hardback, paperback)
- ISBN: 0-333-98932-5
- OCLC: 53242464
- Preceded by: The Summer That Never Was
- Followed by: Strange Affair

Playing with Fire is the 14th novel by Yorkshire-born, Canadian detective fiction writer Peter Robinson in the Inspector Banks series. It was published in 2004 and nominated for that year's Hammett Prize.

== Reception ==
Gary Curtis of The Hamilton Spectator called it a "red-hot scorcher, a BritCrime epic with Peter Banks at his best." Oline H. Cogdill of the South Florida Sun Sentinel called the novel "crime fiction at its best" and opined that it "shows why Robinson's novel continue to be a pleasure." Al Hutchison of The Tampa Tribune opined that while the novel "may not quite match up to" In a Dry Season, the tenth novel in the series, as a "literary achievement", there is "no question Robinson is on a winning streak."
