= In a Dry Season =

1999 crime novel by Peter Robinson

In A Dry Season
- First edition
- Author: Peter Robinson
- Language: English
- Series: Inspector Alan Banks, #10
- Genre: Crime novel
- Publisher: Viking Press
- Publication date: 1999
- Publication place: Canada
- Media type: Print (hardback, paperback)
- ISBN: 0-330-39201-8
- OCLC: 50877992
- Preceded by: Dead Right
- Followed by: Cold Is the Grave

In a Dry Season is the tenth novel by Canadian detective fiction writer Peter Robinson in the Inspector Banks series of novels.

The novel is widely acclaimed as Robinson's best, a large step forward in ambition from previous books, and this was reflected in its critical and commercial response. The novel won the Anthony Award, the Barry Award and the Martin Beck Award and was shortlisted for the Hammett Prize, the Macavity Award and the Edgar Award.

== Research on the period ==
After researching the Second World War for In a Dry Season, Robinson wrote two short stories set in wartime (1940s) Yorkshire involving Frank Bascombe a "special constable in the war" and veteran of the First World War: Missing in Action and In Flanders Fields, which were published in Not Safe After Dark. A third story "Cornelius Jubb" in The Price of Love involves "Constable Bascombe", although he could not use the full name "Frank Bascombe" in the collection for copyright reasons; see Introduction and Afternotes to the collections.

== Location of setting ==
With its setting in Yorkshire, England, the name of the lost village "Hobb's End" and other local references, it was always suggested that Robinson based the location on the real life lost village of "West End", the ruins of which lie under Thruscross reservoir (also in Yorkshire). Robinson himself confirmed this in a podcast he recorded for Yorkshire Water in 2007, eight years after the novel was first published. During exceptionally dry summers, the remains of West End have been exposed as the reservoir dries up, just as the fictional Hobb's End is in this novel.
