= Dry Bones That Dream =

1994 crime novel by Peter Robinson

Dry Bones that Dream
- First edition (Canada) with title Final Account
- Author: Peter Robinson
- Language: English
- Series: Inspector Alan Banks, #7
- Genre: Crime novel
- Publisher: Viking Press
- Publication date: 1994
- Publication place: Canada
- Media type: Print (hardback, paperback)
- ISBN: 0-330-48220-3
- OCLC: 47036069
- Preceded by: Wednesday's Child
- Followed by: Innocent Graves

Dry Bones that Dream is the seventh novel by Canadian detective fiction writer Peter Robinson in the Inspector Banks series. It was published in 1994, and re-named Final Account in the US and Canada.
