= Abattoir Blues (novel) =

2014 crime novel by Peter Robinson

- First edition (Canada)
- Author: Peter Robinson
- Language: English
- Series: Inspector Alan Banks, #22
- Genre: Crime novel
- Publisher: Hodder & Stoughton (UK); McClelland & Stewart (Canada)
- Publication date: 2014
- Publication place: Canada
- Media type: Print (hardback, paperback)
- ISBN: 978-1-444-70496-9
- Preceded by: Children of the Revolution
- Followed by: When the Music's Over

Abattoir Blues (American title: In the Dark Places) is the 22nd novel by Canadian detective fiction writer Peter Robinson in the Inspector Banks series set in Yorkshire. It was published in 2014.

== Plot ==
DCI Banks has been on holiday in Umbria, Italy, meeting his girlfriend Oriana's family. He is due back on Tuesday but calls into work a day early.

Annie investigates "a bloody stolen tractor". The crime is linked to a human bloodstain found in a hangar at a disused wartime aerodrome, and ties into a local criminal ring run by the tractor owner who is an ex-city financier. Beddowes is a "hobby" farmer, not a "real" farmer according to the locals. When a lorry carrying corpses of fallen farm animals for incineration crashes off the isolated Belderfield Pass, amongst the animal remains there is a dismembered human body, probably that of a missing petty criminal from the criminal ring. Vegetarian DI Annie has to investigate the local (legitimate) abattoirs.

Richard "Dirty Dick" Burgess helps Banks out in London as "Operation Hawk" is targeting rural crime. After talking to Burgess who tells him that the London mastermind has "coughed" to save himself, Banks feels defeated. Banks finds an hours-old note from DS Winsome Jackman saying she is off to the isolated High Point Farm and wants backup. Banks rushes there and is told Winsome has hidden in the Swainsdale cave system, which she knows, as she is a keen potholer. She had found an illegal abattoir; the villain chases her but gets stuck in the caves and dies of hypothermia.
