= Dead Right (novel) =

1997 crime novel by Peter Robinson

- First edition
- Author: Peter Robinson
- Language: English
- Series: Inspector Alan Banks, #9
- Genre: Crime novel
- Publisher: Viking Press
- Publication date: 1997
- Publication place: Canada
- Media type: Print (hardback, paperback)
- ISBN: 0-330-48218-1
- OCLC: 47037141
- Preceded by: Innocent Graves
- Followed by: In a Dry Season

Dead Right is the ninth novel by Canadian detective fiction writer Peter Robinson in the Inspector Banks series. It was published in 1997 and re-titled Blood at the Root in the US.
