= Aftermath (Robinson novel) =

2001 crime novel by Peter Robinson

- First edition
- Author: Peter Robinson
- Language: English
- Series: Inspector Alan Banks, #12
- Genre: Crime novel
- Publisher: McClelland & Stewart
- Publication date: October 2001
- Publication place: Canada
- Media type: Print (hardback, paperback)
- ISBN: 0-333-90741-8
- OCLC: 48835446
- Preceded by: Cold is the Grave
- Followed by: The Summer That Never Was

Aftermath is the 12th novel by Canadian detective fiction writer Peter Robinson in the Inspector Banks series. It was published in 2001. It became the basis of the pilot episode of the British television series, DCI Banks, which first aired in the UK in 2010.

== Plot ==
One early morning in May, Banks is called to a steep, overgrown street in Leeds, where two police officers answering a domestic call have stumbled on a scene of unbelievable horror. In the cellar of 35 The Hill, two people are dead, a third is dying, and behind a door more bodies are laid out. This seems to be the end of a grisly case Banks has been working on for some time, but it turns out to be only the beginning. It is apparent who the murderer is, but Banks quickly finds out that nothing in this case is quite as straightforward as it seems. Many people are entangled in this crime – some whose lives are shattered by it, and some with unspeakable secrets in their pasts. The dead, Banks learns, are not the only victims, and the murderer may not be the only person to blame.
