= Peter Robinson (novelist) =

English-Canadian crime writer (1950–2022)

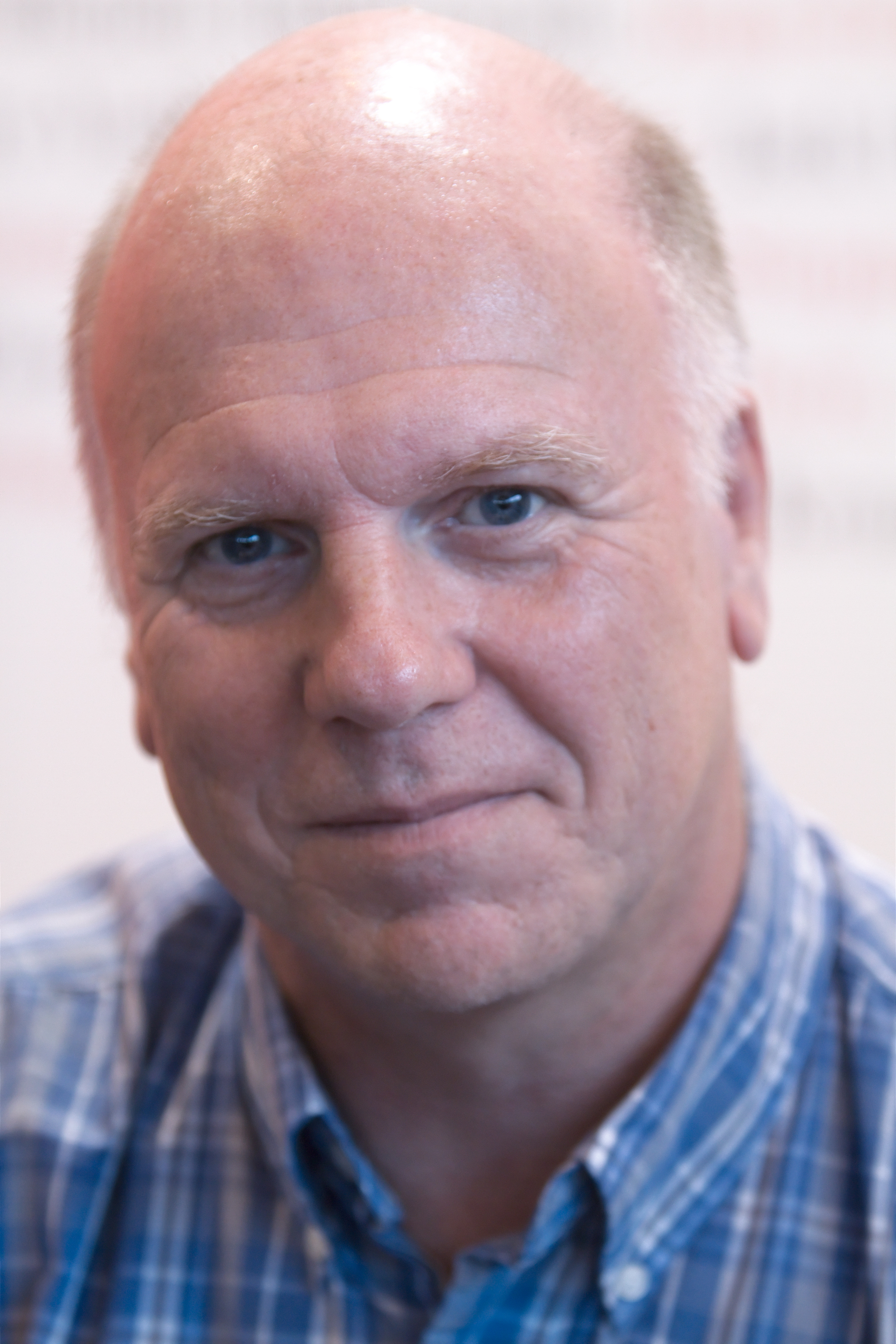
- Robinson in 2010
- Born: 17 March 1950; Armley, Leeds, West Riding of Yorkshire, England
- Died: 4 October 2022 (aged 72); Toronto, Ontario, Canada
- Education: University of Leeds (BA Hons); University of Windsor (MA); York University (PhD)
- Spouse: Sheila Halladay
- Writing career
- Genre: Crime
- Notable work: Inspector Alan Banks
- Notable awards: Dagger in the Library (2002); Anthony Awards 2000; Barry Award 1999
- Website: www.inspectorbanks.com

Peter Robinson (17 March 1950 – 4 October 2022) was a British-born Canadian crime writer who was best known for his crime novels set in Yorkshire featuring Inspector Alan Banks. He also published a number of other novels and short stories, as well as some poems and two articles on writing.

== Early life ==
Robinson was born in Armley, Leeds, on 17 March 1950. His father, Clifford, worked as a photographer; his mother, Miriam (Jarvis), was a homemaker. Robinson studied English literature at the University of Leeds, graduating with a Bachelor of Arts degree with honours. He then emigrated to Canada in 1974 to continue his studies, obtaining a Master of Arts degree in English and Creative Writing from the University of Windsor, with Joyce Carol Oates as his tutor. He was later awarded a Doctor of Philosophy degree in English at York University in 1983.

== Career ==
Robinson taught at several colleges and universities in Toronto, and the University of Windsor (his alma mater) as writer-in-residence from 1992 to 1993. He was best known for the Inspector Banks series of novels set in the fictional Yorkshire town of Eastvale. His first novel, Gallows View, was published in 1987. It garnered him the Crime Writers of Canada Arthur Ellis Award, which he went on to win six more times during his career. The series was eventually translated into twenty languages by the time of his death. He also wrote two collections of short stories – Not Safe After Dark (1998) and The Price of Love (2009) – as well as another novel, Caedmon's Song, released in 1990.

== Personal life ==
Robinson resided in the Beaches area of Toronto with his wife, Sheila Halladay, and he occasionally taught crime writing at the University of Toronto's School of Continuing Studies. He also taught at a number of Toronto colleges and served as Writer-in-Residence at the University of Windsor, 1992–1993. Robinson and his wife had a holiday cottage in Richmond, North Yorkshire. He died on 4 October 2022, at the age of 72.

== Awards and honours ==
In 2002 Robison was awarded the Dagger in the Library by the Crime Writers' Association.

In 2020, Robinson received the Grand Master Award from Crime Writers of Canada, and in 2010, he received their Derrick Murdoch Award. Two years prior, he had been honoured with the Toronto Public Library Celebrates Reading Award.

Awards and honours for Robinson's writing
Year	Title	Award	Result	Ref.
1988	Gallows View	Arthur Ellis Award for Best Crime Novel	Finalist	
1989	A Dedicated Man	Arthur Ellis Award for Best Crime Novel	Finalist	
1990	The Hanging Valley	Arthur Ellis Award for Best Crime Novel	Finalist	
1990	"Innocence"	Arthur Ellis Award for Best Short Story	Winner	
1991	Caedmon's Song (The First Cut)	Arthur Ellis Award for Best Crime Novel	Finalist	
1991	"Innocence"	Arthur Ellis Award for Best Crime Short Story	Winner	
1991	Past Reason Hated	Arthur Ellis Award for Best Novel	Winner	
1992	Past Reason Hated	Arthur Ellis Award for Best Crime Novel	Winner	
1993	Wednesday's Child	Arthur Ellis Award for Best Crime Novel	Finalist	
1994		TORGI Talking Book Award		
1995	Final Account	Author's Award, Foundation for the Advancement of Canadian Letters		
1995	"Lawn Sale"	Arthur Ellis Award for Best Crime Short Story	Finalist	
1995	"Summer Rain"	Arthur Ellis Award for Best Crime Short Story	Finalist	
1995	Wednesday's Child	Edgar Award for Best Novel	Finalist	
1996	"Carrion"	Arthur Ellis Award for Best Crime Short Story	Finalist	
1997	Innocent Graves	Arthur Ellis Award for Best Novel	Winner	
1998	Dead Right (Blood at the Root)	Arthur Ellis Award for Best Crime Novel	Finalist	
1998	"The Two Ladies of Rose Cottage"	Arthur Ellis Award for Best Crime Short Story	Finalist	
1998	"The Two Ladies of Rose Cottage"	Macavity Award for Best Short Story	Winner	
1999	"The Two Ladies of Rose Cottage"	Anthony Award for Best Short Story	Nominee	
2000	In a Dry Season	Anthony Award for Best Novel	Winner	
2000	In a Dry Season	Arthur Ellis Award for Best Crime Novel	Finalist	
2000	In a Dry Season	Barry Award for Best Novel	Winner	
2000	In a Dry Season	Edgar Award for Best Novel	Finalist	
2000	In a Dry Season	Macavity Award for Best Mystery Novel	Finalist	
2000	"Missing in Action"	Edgar Award for Best Short Story	Winner	
2001	Cold is the Grave	Arthur Ellis Award for Best Crime Novel	Winner	
2001	In a Dry Season	Le Grand Prix de Littérature Policière		
2001	In a Dry Season	Martin Beck Award	Winner	
2001	"Missing In Action"	Anthony Award for Best Short Story	Nominee	
2001	"Murder in Utopia"	Arthur Ellis Award for Best Crime Short Story	Winner	
2002	Aftermath	Arthur Ellis Award for Best Crime Novel	Finalist	
2002	The Hanging Valley	Spoken Word Bronze Award		
2004	The Summer That Never Was (Close To Home)	Anthony Award for Best Novel	Nominee	
2004	The Summer That Never Was (Close To Home)	Arthur Ellis Award for Best Crime Novel	Finalist	
2005	Playing with Fire	Arthur Ellis Award for Best Crime Novel	Finalist	
2005	Playing with Fire	Macavity Award for Best Mystery Novel	Finalist	
2006	Cold is the Grave	Palle Rosenkrantz Award		
2006	Strange Affair	Arthur Ellis Award for Best Crime Novel	Finalist	
2006	Strange Affair	Macavity Award for Best Mystery Novel	Finalist	
2007	Piece of My Heart	Arthur Ellis Award for Best Crime Novel	Finalist	
2007	Piece of My Heart	Macavity Award for Best Mystery Novel	Finalist	
2009	"Walking the Dog"	Arthur Ellis Award for Best Crime Short Story	Finalist	
2012	Before the Poison	Arthur Ellis Award for Best Crime Novel	Winner	
2012	Before the Poison	Martin Beck Award	Winner	
2017	"The Village That Lost Its Head"	Arthur Ellis Award for Best Crime Novella	Finalist	
2018	Sleeping in the Ground	Arthur Ellis Award for Best Crime Novel	Winner	

== Publications ==
=== Inspector Banks series ===
The novels are set in the fictional English town of Eastvale in the Yorkshire Dales. Robinson has stated that Eastvale is modelled on Ripon and Richmond and is somewhere north of Ripon, close to the A1 road. A former member of the London Metropolitan Police, Inspector Alan Banks leaves the capital for a quieter life in the Dales. Since 2010 several of the novels have been adapted for television under the series title DCI Banks with Stephen Tompkinson in the title role.

1. Gallows View (1987), ISBN 9780425156728
2. A Dedicated Man (1988), ISBN 9780380716456
3. A Necessary End (1989), ISBN 9780140115451
4. The Hanging Valley (1989), ISBN 9780684193939
5. Past Reason Hated (1991), ISBN 9780330469401
6. Wednesday's Child (1992), ISBN 9780684196442
7. Dry Bones That Dream (1994), ISBN 9780094744400 (published in the United States as Final Account)
8. Innocent Graves (1996), ISBN 9781743031681
9. Dead Right (1997), ISBN 9781743030905 (published in the United States as Blood at the Root)
10. In a Dry Season (1999), ISBN 9780380975815
11. Cold Is the Grave (2000), ISBN 9781743031636
12. Aftermath (2001), ISBN 9780333907429
13. The Summer that Never Was (2003), ISBN 9780333907443 (published in the United States as Close to Home)
14. Playing with Fire (2004), ISBN 9780061031106
15. Strange Affair (2005), ISBN 9780060544331
16. Piece of My Heart (2006), ISBN 9780340836873
17. Friend of the Devil (2007), ISBN 9780340836903
18. All the Colours of Darkness (2008), ISBN 9781551991450
19. Bad Boy (2010), ISBN 9780062008763
20. Watching the Dark (2012), ISBN 9781848949058
21. Children of the Revolution (2013), ISBN 9781444704914
22. Abattoir Blues (2014), ISBN 9781848949072 (published in the United States as In the Dark Places)
23. When the Music's Over (2016), ISBN 9780062466389
24. Sleeping in the Ground (2017), ISBN 9780062395078
25. Careless Love (2018), ISBN 9780771072789
26. Many Rivers to Cross (2019), ISBN 9781444787030
27. Not Dark Yet (2021), ISBN 9781529343120
28. Standing in the Shadows (2023), ISBN 9780062994998

=== Other works ===
Although Caedmon's Song is a standalone novella, it is related to Friend of the Devil, which is also related to Aftermath.

- Caedmon's Song (1990), ISBN 9780143043331
- The First Cut – American edition of Caedmon's Song (1993), ISBN 9780060735357
- No Cure for Love (1995), ISBN 9780143173281
- Not Safe After Dark (Crippen & Landru, 1998 & Macmillan Publishers, 2004), ISBN 9781743032312 (Short stories; includes three Inspector Banks stories)
- The Price of Love (2009), ISBN 9781848944374 (Short stories; includes an Inspector Banks novella and three Banks stories)
- Before the Poison (2011), ISBN 9780771076220
