= Friend of the Devil (novel) =

2007 novel by Peter Robinson

- Author: Peter Robinson
- Language: English
- Series: Inspector Alan Banks, #17
- Genre: Crime novel
- Publisher: McClelland & Stewart
- Publication date: August 2007
- Publication place: Canada
- Media type: Print (hardback, paperback)
- ISBN: 0-340-83689-X
- OCLC: 86166988
- Preceded by: Piece of My Heart
- Followed by: All the Colours of Darkness

Friend of the Devil is the 17th novel by Canadian detective fiction writer Peter Robinson in the Inspector Banks series of novels. It was first published in 2007.

== Reception ==
Paul Marck of the Edmonton Journal wrote that the novel is "quite simply one of the most compelling, raw and bitterly emotional chapters in the Banks anthology." Laura DeMarco of The Plain Dealer wrote that mystery for the Cabbot character, as well as Robinson's "excellent skill at creating place and time and character", make the novel a "must-read for any fans of Brit mysteries". Oline H. Cogdill of the South Florida Sun Sentinel wrote that while Robinson "revisits some characters", he "intelligently puts a compelling new spin".
