= DCI Banks =

British television crime drama series

- Intertitle (2010–2016)
- Genre: Crime drama
- Based on: Inspector Alan Banks by Peter Robinson
- Starring: Stephen Tompkinson; Andrea Lowe; Caroline Catz
- Composer: Sheridan Tongue
- Country of origin: United Kingdom
- Original language: English
- No. of series: 5 + Pilot
- No. of episodes: 32 (list of episodes)

Production
- Executive producers: Andy Harries; Francis Hopkinson
- Producer: Stephen Smallwoad
- Running time: 45 minutes
- Production company: Left Bank Pictures

Original release
- Network: ITV
- Release: 27 September 2010 – 5 October 2016

DCI Banks is a British television crime drama series produced by Left Bank Pictures for the ITV network. Originally broadcast over five series in 2010–2016, the series was based on Peter Robinson's Inspector Alan Banks novels and stars Stephen Tompkinson as Detective Chief Inspector Alan Banks. In 2013, the series won in the drama category at the regional Royal Television Society Yorkshire Programme Awards.

== Background ==
In January 2010, author Peter Robinson signed with Left Bank Pictures and ITV to adapt novels from the Detective Chief Inspector Alan Banks series for television. Filming on a two-part pilot based on Aftermath was completed in July 2010, with scenes filmed in Leeds. DCI Banks: Aftermath was broadcast on ITV on 27 September and 4 October 2010. The two episodes drew 6.55 million viewers, twice becoming the fifth most-watched programme on the ITV network that week.

ITV commissioned six episodes – three two-part dramas adapted from three novels for the first series. Filming began in February 2011 and included locations in Otley for Friend of the Devil. Some shop names were unchanged during filming. The first episode, Playing with Fire, aired 16 September 2011, and drew an average of 4.5 million viewers. The subsequent two-part dramas, Friend of the Devil and Cold is the Grave, achieved similar ratings.

ITV commissioned a second series. Filming began in March 2012, and episodes began broadcasting from 10 October. For this series, the novels Dry Bones that Dream, Innocent Graves and Strange Affair were adapted. With Andrea Lowe on maternity leave, Stephen Tompkinson was joined by Caroline Catz as DI Helen Morton, a character not in the novels. Sally Haynes, head of the ITV drama commissioning, said of the second series: "DCI Banks is now established as a firm favourite within ITV's crime drama slate. We're delighted so many viewers are appreciating Robert Murphy’s adaptations and how the team at Left Bank Pictures are producing DCI Banks."

On 1 December 2012, Peter Robinson announced on his website " that DCI Banks has been recommissioned for a third series of six one-hour episodes (again, three two-parters), according to a revised statement posted June 17, 2013, based on three books: Wednesday’s Child, Piece of My Heart, and Bad Boy. The revised announcement said filming would begin in August 2013, broadcast dates to be confirmed later. In January 2013, Stephen Tompkinson mentioned in an interview "I’m pleased to say [DCI Banks has] recently been commissioned for a third series, which should start filming later in the year," and in a subsequent interview he said: "In series three [DCI Alan] Banks will be assisted by both Annie and Helen," indicating that Lowe and Catz will return. Describing Alan Banks, Tompkinson said, "He is heavily reliant on his team and a great, almost patrician leader."

The show was originally shown on ITV but from June 2014 the show was repeated on ITV's subscription drama channel ITV Encore on Friday nights.

On 22 September 2014, ITV announced the show was renewed for a fourth series. Filming began in Yorkshire in September 2014. The fourth series featured six hour-long original episodes inspired by Peter Robinson's books and aired from 4 March 2015 to 8 April 2015.

On 3 December 2015, ITV announced the show was renewed for a fifth and final series.

== Cast ==
In an article written for The Telegraph when the pilot DCI Banks: Aftermath first aired in the UK, Peter Robinson wrote:

A lot of people asked me about the casting of Stephen Tompkinson as Banks....I met Stephen early on in the process, and he wanted to...find out everything he could from me about the character. I was impressed by his dedication, and when I finally saw him 'in character' I thought he managed to convey the essence of Banks. Stephen is taller than the Banks in the books, and my Annie is a brunette, whereas Andrea Lowe plays her as a blonde. It doesn't matter. You can't expect exact duplication. No actor is going to satisfy everybody's image of the way a fictional character should look, but that doesn’t mean he or she can't capture that character's spirit.

Actor	Character	Rank	Position	Series					Duration	Episode count
Actor	Character	Rank	Position	1	2	3	4	5	Duration	Episode count
Stephen Tompkinson	Alan Banks	Detective Chief Inspector	Major Crimes S.I.O.	Main	Main	Main	Main	Main	1.01–5.06	32
Andrea Lowe	Annie Cabbot	Detective Sergeant	Major Crimes Detective	Main	Main	Main	Main	Main	1.01–2.02; 3.01–5.05	27
Caroline Catz	Helen Morton	Detective Inspector	Major Crimes Deputy S.I.O.		Main	Main	Main	Main	2.01–5.06	24
Jack Deam	Ken Blackstone	Detective Constable	Major Crimes Detective	Also Starring	Also Starring	Also Starring	Also Starring	Also Starring	1.01–5.06	32
Lorraine Burroughs	Winsome Jackman	Detective Sergeant	Major Crimes Detective	Also Starring	Also Starring				1.01–2.06	14
Danny Rahim	Tariq Lang	Detective Constable	Major Crimes Detective			Also Starring	Also Starring		3.03–4.06	10
Samuel Anderson	Vince Grady	Detective Constable	Major Crimes Detective					Also Starring	5.01–5.06	06
Tom Shaw	Kevin Templeton	Detective Constable	Major Crimes Detective	Recurring					1.03–1.06	04
Nick Sidi	Ron McLaughlin	Detective Chief Superintendent	Borough Commander	Recurring	Recurring	Recurring	Recurring		1.08–4.06	15
Colin Tierney	Gerry Rydell	Detective Chief Superintendent	Borough Commander	Recurring					1.01–1.08	08
Shaun Dingwall	Colin Anderson	Detective Chief Superintendent	Borough Commander					Recurring	5.01–5.06	06

== Episodes ==
All episodes, to date, have been in two parts, often broadcast a week apart. For re-broadcast on U.S. public television stations, the two parts are usually re-edited into a single 90-minute episode (without commercial interruption).

The pilot was broadcast in late 2010, and good viewing numbers ensured the making of the subsequent series. Each series has comprised three two-part episodes. Series 1 was broadcast in late 2011, Series 2 in late 2012, Series 3 in early 2014, Series 4 in early 2015 and Series 5 in late 2016.

== International distribution ==
On 9 January 2013, BBC Worldwide America announced a "landmark syndication deal" with public television stations in the US for DCI Banks to be available on 166 PBS affiliate stations, "reaching an estimated 77% of U.S. TV households". The syndication deal includes the pilot, and Series 1 and 2. Idaho Public Television created a website for the show and posted all the episodes to be streamed on demand in the US . Although each drama was shown in two parts over two weeks in the UK, on PBS they have been shown as single 90-minute dramas. Julius Cain of BBC Worldwide America, said: "This syndication deal marks the largest we have inked to date between BBC Worldwide America and public television stations."

DCI Banks has also been broadcast in Canada, and it aired in Norway on NRK1. In Sweden, national public service broadcaster SVT aired the pilot and three Series 1 episodes (each about 90 minutes in length). Similar airings occurred in Denmark. The pilot and Series 1 have also been aired in Finland (YLE1). In Estonia, national public service broadcaster ETV aired the pilot and Series 1 in autumn 2012, with Series 2 due to be aired in the end of September 2013. Series 1 was aired in Germany (ZDF) in 3 episodes of 90 minutes each, between 26 May and 9 June 2013 under the title Inspector Banks. In Australia, the show has aired on subscription TV channel, UKTV, and in May 2013, began screening on free-to-air station ABC1. In France, the drama began on 2 November 2012 on Arte.

DCI Banks has also been broadcast in Saudi Arabia by OSN (Orbit Showtime Network) which had forged an exclusive deal with BBC First HD that would carry the broadcast to Middle East & North Africa with programming screening 48 hours after their UK premier.

== DVD releases ==
The Series 1 DVD was released for Region 2 (UK) on 31 October 2011. The two disc-set features the pilot Aftermath and the three two-part dramas of Series 1. Extra features include some deleted scenes and short interviews with Stephen Tompkinson and Andrea Lowe. The Region 2 DVD of Series 2 was released in the UK 19 November 2012, and contains three two-part dramas. Panvision has published DVDs of the pilot and Series 1 with subtitles in Swedish, Danish, Norwegian and Finnish.

Season	Region 1	Region 2	Region 4
Season 1	June 17, 2014	October 31, 2011	June 5, 2013
Season 2	September 16, 2014	November 19, 2012	September 17, 2014
Season 3	October 10, 2015	March 30, 2015	June 10, 2015
Season 4	June 28, 2016	August 15, 2016	November 4, 2015
Season 5	April 4, 2017	October 10, 2016	February 8, 2017
