= Gorky Park (novel) =

1981 novel by Martin Cruz Smith

- First edition
- Author: Martin Cruz Smith
- Language: English
- Series: Arkady Renko # 1
- Genre: Crime novel
- Publisher: Random House & GK Hall
- Publication date: March 1981
- Publication place: United States
- Media type: Print (hard and paperback)
- Pages: 365 pp
- ISBN: 0-394-51748-2
- OCLC: 6914272
- Dewey Decimal: 813/.54 19
- LC Class: PS3569.M5377 G6
- Followed by: Polar Star

Gorky Park is a 1981 crime novel written by American author Martin Cruz Smith. Set in the Soviet Union during the Cold War, Gorky Park is the first book in a series featuring the character Arkady Renko, a Moscow homicide investigator.

Gorky Park was a major best-seller, vaulting Smith to fame after a decade as a moderately successful professional author. The novel was praised for the authenticity with which it depicted life in the Soviet Union during the Cold War. It was adapted into a successful 1983 film of the same name.

== Plot ==
The story follows Arkady Renko, a chief investigator for the Moscow militsiya, who is assigned to a case involving three corpses found in Gorky Park, a large urban park in Moscow. The victims – two men and a woman – were shot, and have had their faces and fingertips cut off by the murderer to prevent identification.

Ice skates found on the woman's body lead Arkady to Irina Asanova, a wardrobe girl at a movie studio, who claims that she reported them stolen and has no idea how they ended up with the victims. However, Arkady tentatively identifies the three bodies as known associates of Irina: her friend Valerya Davidova, Valerya's boyfriend Kostia Borodin, and an American expatriate student named James Kirwill. Arkady gives the woman's skull to Professor Andreev, an anthropologist at Moscow University, who specializes in reconstructing whole faces from bone structure.

At a bathhouse, Arkady's superior, Chief Prosecutor Iamskoy, introduces Arkady to an American fur millionaire, John Osborne, who regularly visits the Soviet Union. When Arkady begins to suspect a connection between Osborne and the murders, he is warned by his associate, Mendel, a junior official in the Soviet Trade Ministry, that Osborne is an informant for the KGB, and thus regarded as a "friend" by all of Arkady's superiors.

Arkady's problems escalate when his partner is shot to death investigating Davidova's apartment, and Kirwill's elder brother William, a detective with the New York City Police Department who speaks fluent Russian, arrives in Moscow intending to find and kill his brother's murderer. Arkady tries to discover as much as he can from Kirwill to confirm the corpse's identity, without admitting that he suspects Osborne.

When Irina is attacked on the Moscow metro, Arkady hides her in his own apartment, vacant since his wife, Zoya, left him for one of her colleagues at the school where she teaches.

Arkady reluctantly pays a visit to his father, retired Red Army General Renko, a.k.a. "Stalin's Favorite General", a.k.a. "The Butcher of Ukraine". The elder Renko remembers that Osborne was an O.S.S. officer attached to the Red Army during the Nazi invasion, tasked with interrogating three captured S.S. officers. Thanks to his charm and fluent German, Osborne got the information he needed from the officers over a friendly picnic in the countryside, then shot all three of them dead – almost exactly the manner in which the three bodies in Gorky Park were killed.

Arkady and Irina become lovers after admitting their mutual attraction. Still, Arkady is convinced that she knows about Osborne's connection with the three victims, except she believes that Osborne has helped Valerya and Kostia to defect to America, with their friend Kirwill, a radical anti-Soviet, hoping to claim a publicity victory for having facilitated their escape. To convince Irina that Valerya is dead, Arkady sets up a situation in which he will show her Professor Andreev's reconstruction, even though, by this point, Renko's higher-ups have destroyed it. The ruse works, and she admits that her friend is dead rather than have to look at the reconstructed head.

Despite being born into the nomenklatura himself, Arkady exposes corruption and dishonesty of influential, well-protected members of the Soviet elite, regardless of the consequences. This rebounds on him when his own superior, Iamskoy, and his best friend, a lawyer named Misha, are both revealed to be working with Osborne. Arkady flees a meeting with Misha before a gang of killers arrives, but is too late to prevent Iamskoy from appropriating the reconstructed head and destroying it.

Arkady confronts Osborne at gunpoint as he is about to leave the country, but Osborne informs him that Iamskoy has already kidnapped Irina; if Arkady lets Osborne go and rushes to the university campus, he might be just in time to save her. Arkady does so, killing Iamskoy and Osborne's chief henchman, but suffering a near-fatal stomach wound.

He recuperates in the KGB's custody, being regularly interrogated and watched over by his old antagonist, KGB Major Pribluda. Despite his weakened state, Arkady laughs when he realizes from his interrogators' questions that Iamskoy was himself a high-ranking KGB officer, planted as a spy in the militsiya, and his superiors were badly embarrassed to find that he betrayed them to help Osborne.

Months later, Arkady is brought before a KGB General who confirms what Arkady already suspected: that Kostia Borodin (an expert hunter) and Valerya helped Osborne to trap and smuggle live sables – the only high-quality fur-bearing animal on which the Soviet Union enjoys a monopoly – out of the country. They believed Osborne would help them defect in exchange, but instead he killed them. Now, after several months of negotiations, Osborne has agreed to return the sables in exchange for Renko's release and being brought to the United States.

Arkady's brief trip to New York City reunites him with Osborne, Irina, and Kirwill in succession. Arkady is outraged when Osborne tells him that he and Irina are lovers, but Irina swears that she only slept with Osborne twice – once to convince him to help her defect, and once more to convince him to get Arkady out of the Soviet Union.

FBI agents escort Arkady and Irina to Osborne's ranch on Staten Island where the exchange is supposed to take place. During the trip, Arkady realizes that, to avoid a diplomatic incident, the FBI agents plan to let Osborne kill him and Irina before allowing KGB agents, who are tailing them, to kill Osborne. When they arrive at the ranch, the group finds Kirwill, shot and disembowelled. He finally identified Osborne as his brother's killer, but was overcome by Osborne's attack dogs when he came to confront him.

Osborne appears, armed with a hunting rifle, and Arkady convinces him that the FBI is planning a betrayal. Osborne shoots two of the FBI agents as two KGB agents arrive, and the KGB and FBI agents are killed in the chaotic firefight that ensues. Osborne finally corners and wounds Arkady in the sable pens. Arkady gains the upper hand by releasing several of the sables, causing Osborne to rush recklessly into the pen where Arkady can shoot and kill him. Irina arrives and says she wants to stay in the U.S., but Arkady, finding the United States as corrupt as the Soviet Union, chooses to return to his homeland. He knows that if he does return to Moscow, the Soviet authorities will be less inclined to demand Irina's return.

Renko concludes the only way to calm the Soviet authorities is to kill all the contraband sables, but instead he decides to break open their cages and release them into the forest.

== Pathoheterodoxy syndrome ==
Pathoheterodoxy syndrome is a fictional mental illness. It is the idea of a misguided arrogance. The syndrome was said to be contracted by Chief Investigator Renko, who was thus described by a KGB agent:

You have unreal expectations… You overestimate your personal powers. You feel isolated from society. You swing from excitement to sadness. You mistrust the people who most want to help you. You resent authority even when you represent it. You think you are the exception to every rule. You underestimate the collective intelligence. What is right is wrong and what is wrong is right.

Smith satirically created the concept of pathoheterodoxy to show the way that the Soviet Union would have characterised Soviet dissidents and their failure to obey and conform. While the syndrome itself is fictional, the incident also alludes to the very real Soviet practice of diagnosing dissidents with "sluggish schizophrenia", and of forcibly treating them with psychotropic drugs. Renko's love interest, Irina, was likewise revealed to have been institutionalized for similarly false "psychiatric problems" and forcibly treated at some earlier time, resulting in a tumor that left her with a severe facial blemish and blind in one eye.

== Critical reception ==
Smith returned to the U.S. after a visit to the Soviet Union in 1971 with the idea for a novel about a Moscow detective, but his publisher was unimpressed. He continued work on Gorky Park for a decade before the novel was finally published in 1981.

The Washington Post said of Gorky Park that "More perhaps than any other recent work of American fiction, this one conveys a feeling for the Soviet Union, its capital, its moods and its people." The New York Times said the Gorky Park "reminds you just how satisfying a smoothly turned thriller can be". In 2016, The Strand Magazine named Gorky Park one of the top five Cold War spy novels. The Guardian said that "the book's depiction of contemporary Soviet life was so alarmingly accurate, it was soon banned in the Soviet Union" and "became popular with dissident [Soviet] intellectuals". Gorky Park was awarded the Crime Writers' Association's Gold Dagger award in 1981.

Although the authenticity of Gorky Park is often praised, Smith spent only two weeks in the Soviet Union researching the book, relying mostly on libraries and interviews with Soviet immigrants in the United States for details about the daily life of Cold War-era Moscow.

== Series ==
Two subsequent books, Polar Star and Red Square, are also set during the Soviet era. Eight further books starring Renko take place after the fall of the Soviet Union. These are Havana Bay, set in communist Cuba; Wolves Eat Dogs, which follows Renko in the disaster of Chernobyl; Stalin's Ghost, in which Arkady returns to a Russia led by Vladimir Putin; Three Stations; Tatiana; The Siberian Dilemma; Independence Square; and Hotel Ukraine.

== Film adaptation ==
In 1983 a film adaptation of the novel was released starring William Hurt as Arkady, Joanna Pacula as Irina, Lee Marvin as Osborne and Brian Dennehy as Kirwill.

== See also ==
- Child 44
- Fatherland
- Flower Net
