= Nightwing (disambiguation) =

Nightwing is a fictional superhero appearing in comic books published by DC Comics.

Nightwing may also refer to:

== Music ==
- Nightwing (band), a British rock band
- Nightwing (album), a 1997 album by Swedish black metal band Marduk
- "Nightwing", a song on Black Sabbath's 1989 album, Headless Cross
- Nightwings (Stanley Turrentine album), a 1977 jazz album
- Nightwings (Pat Martino album), a 1994 jazz album

== Other uses ==
- Nightwing (film), a 1979 American horror film
- Nightwing (novel), a 1977 thriller by Martin Cruz Smith
- Nightwings (novella), 1968 science fiction novella by Robert Silverberg
- NightWings, a tribe of dragons in the fantasy novel series Wings of Fire

== See also ==
- Nite-Wing, a character from the comic series Nightwing
