= Gorky Park (film) =

1983 American mystery thriller film

- Theatrical release poster
- Directed by: Michael Apted
- Screenplay by: Dennis Potter
- Based on: Gorky Park by Martin Cruz Smith
- Produced by: Hawk Koch; Gene Kirkwood
- Starring: William Hurt; Lee Marvin; Brian Dennehy; Ian Bannen; Joanna Pacuła
- Cinematography: Ralf D. Bode
- Edited by: Dennis Virkler
- Music by: James Horner
- Production companies: Kock/Kirkwood Productions; Eagle Associates
- Distributed by: Orion Pictures
- Release date: December 16, 1983
- Running time: 128 minutes
- Country: United States
- Language: English
- Budget: $15 million
- Box office: $15.9 million

Gorky Park is a 1983 American mystery thriller film directed by Michael Apted and starring William Hurt, Lee Marvin, Brian Dennehy, Ian Bannen, Rikki Fulton, Richard Griffiths, Michael Elphick, and Joanna Pacuła. An adaptation of the 1981 novel by Martin Cruz Smith, it follows Moscow police investigator Arkady Renko (Hurt) on the trail of a gruesome triple murder that leads him into a web of government corruption.

Upon release, Gorky Park was a box office disappointment, barely earning back its $15 million budget, but received positive reviews from critics. Pacuła was nominated for a Golden Globe Award for Best Supporting Actress in a Motion Picture and Elphick for a BAFTA Award for Best Supporting Actor. Dennis Potter won a 1984 Edgar Award for his screenplay for the film.

== Plot ==
Moscow militsiya officer Arkady Renko is called to a clearing near the Gorky Park ice rink, where three mutilated bodies – two men and one woman – have been discovered. All were shot in the chest and their faces and finger tips removed; the two men were also shot in the mouth. Renko becomes anxious when the KGB, led by his nemesis Major Pribluda, refuses to take over the investigation. Renko traces the dead woman's skates to a movie set worker, Irina Asanova, who claims they were stolen. The pathologist identifies one young man as a foreigner, likely an American. Renko asks Professor Andreev, a Moscow State University anthropologist, to reconstruct the faces of the woman and the American man.

At the dacha of Chief Prosecutor Iamskoy, Renko makes the acquaintance of American sable importer Jack Osborne, who is accompanied by Asanova. Renko also crosses paths with William Kirwill, a New York detective investigating the disappearance of his brother James.

Renko eventually identifies the American as James Kirwill and the others as Valerya Davidova and her boyfriend Kostia Borodin. Renko and his partner Pasha interrogate Golodkin, a black market dealer with KGB ties, who confesses that Osborne commissioned him to build a religious chest, but the three victims built another one. Renko sends Pasha with Golodkin to get the chest at his apartment, where they are both shot dead by an unseen assailant. Renko's suspicion of Osborne mounts following several polite but tense conversations. When a KGB officer attempts to kill Asanova with a forced overdose, Renko saves her. Hiding out in his apartment, they become involved romantically although she doesn't entirely trust him. Kirwill learns that Osborne's chest was designed to smuggle out six live sables and break the Soviet monopoly, potentially earning Osborne millions. Osborne had promised to smuggle Asanova's friends out of the Soviet Union; Asanova is convinced that Valerya has escaped to Manhattan and clings to the belief that Osborne will do the same for her.

Renko confronts Asanova with Prof. Andreev's reconstruction of Valerya's head, forcing her to accept she has been murdered. She confesses to the plot and flees. Renko and Kirwill go to retrieve James's reconstructed head, but a KGB agent emerges with it. They follow him to Iamskoy's dacha and watch in horror as Osborne and Iamskoy supervise the head's destruction. Renko confronts Iamskoy in a bath house and Iamskoy admits that he kept Renko on the case to pressure Osborne into paying a larger bribe so he could smuggle out the sables. He offers to cut Renko in, but Renko reveals that he has recorded their conversation. Iamskoy and Renko struggle over a gun, which goes off and kills Iamskoy.

Osborne flees to Stockholm, telling the KGB he will only deal with Renko. The KGB forces Renko to supervise a trade for the sables, with the understanding that both the sables and Osborne must be killed. Renko meets Osborne at his apartment and finds Asanova. She confesses that she slept with Osborne to gain his trust and has negotiated safe passage to America for both herself and Renko. She then reveals that Osborne is planning to double cross everyone, as he has twelve sables, not just six. Renko meets with Kirwill and they predict that, following the exchange, the KGB will kill Asanova, Renko and Osborne.

The next morning Renko, Pribluda and two other KGB agents drive to Osborne's secluded farm in the woods of Sweden. They discover Kirwill tied to a tree and disemboweled; he came to get revenge for James and killed Osborne's dogs before being shot. Osborne produces six dead sables, but Renko, realizing neither side will let the other live, goads the KGB agents into attacking. In the ensuing shootout Pribluda and the KGB agents are killed; Renko manages to grab a gun and hide in the woods with Asanova. Moving closer to the farm, he discovers the remaining live sables caged up. Asanova emerges from the woods and Osborne threatens to kill her. When Renko emerges to give up, Asanova shoots Osborne. She asks Renko to go away with her, but Renko reveals he agreed to kill Osborne in return for her freedom, and that they would both be killed if he did not return. Renko returns to his job in Moscow.

In the final scene, Renko is seen releasing the sables from Osborne's cages before leaving Stockholm. As the sables run off into the woods, Renko recalls Irina's promise that they will meet again one day.

== Cast ==
- William Hurt as Arkady Renko
- Lee Marvin as Jack Osborne
- Brian Dennehy as William Kirwill
- Ian Bannen as Chief Prosecutor Andrei Iamskoy
- Joanna Pacuła as Irina Asanova
- Michael Elphick as Pasha Pavlovich
- Richard Griffiths as Anton
- Rikki Fulton as Major Pribluda
- Alexander Knox as The General
- Alexei Sayle as Fyodor Golodkin
- Ian McDiarmid as Professor Andreev
- Niall O'Brien as KGB Agent Rurik
- Henry Woolf as Levin
- Jukka Hirvikangas as James Kirwill
- Marjatta Nissinen as Valerya Davidova
- Heikki Leppänen as Kostia Borodin
- Elsa Salamas as Babushka
- Anatoly Davydov as KGB Agent Nicky
- Patrick Field as Detective Fet

== Production ==
=== Development ===
Gene Kirkwood and Howard W. ("Hawk") Koch Jr. purchased the film rights to Gorky Park in 1981 for $250,000. Author Martin Cruz Smith claimed he was offered the chance to adapt his own novel into a screenplay, but turned it down. Instead, the novel was adapted for the screen by Dennis Potter. The finished screenplay features some minor alterations from the source novel, mainly the climax being set in Stockholm instead of New York City.

Filming was delayed until February 1983 because of scheduling conflicts with original director John Schlesinger, who would eventually be replaced with Michael Apted, and various cast changes.

While the project was in development, director Michael Apted conducted "hours of interviews with Russian émigrés" in order to help "evoke the social atmosphere" of Moscow.

=== Casting ===
Dustin Hoffman and Al Pacino were both considered for the role of Arkady Renko before Hurt's casting, while Cary Grant and Burt Lancaster were considered for the role of Jack Osborne and Roman Polanski was considered for the role of Prof. Andreev. Aside from Polish actress Joanna Pacuła, who was cast as Irina Asanova, the remainder of the cast portraying Russian characters were British actors. Because of this, Hurt, an American, spoke with an English accent in the film to match his co-stars. The film marked Pacuła's first English-speaking role. Brian Dennehy was cast as William Kirwill, an American police officer from New York City conducting an investigation abroad.

=== Filming ===
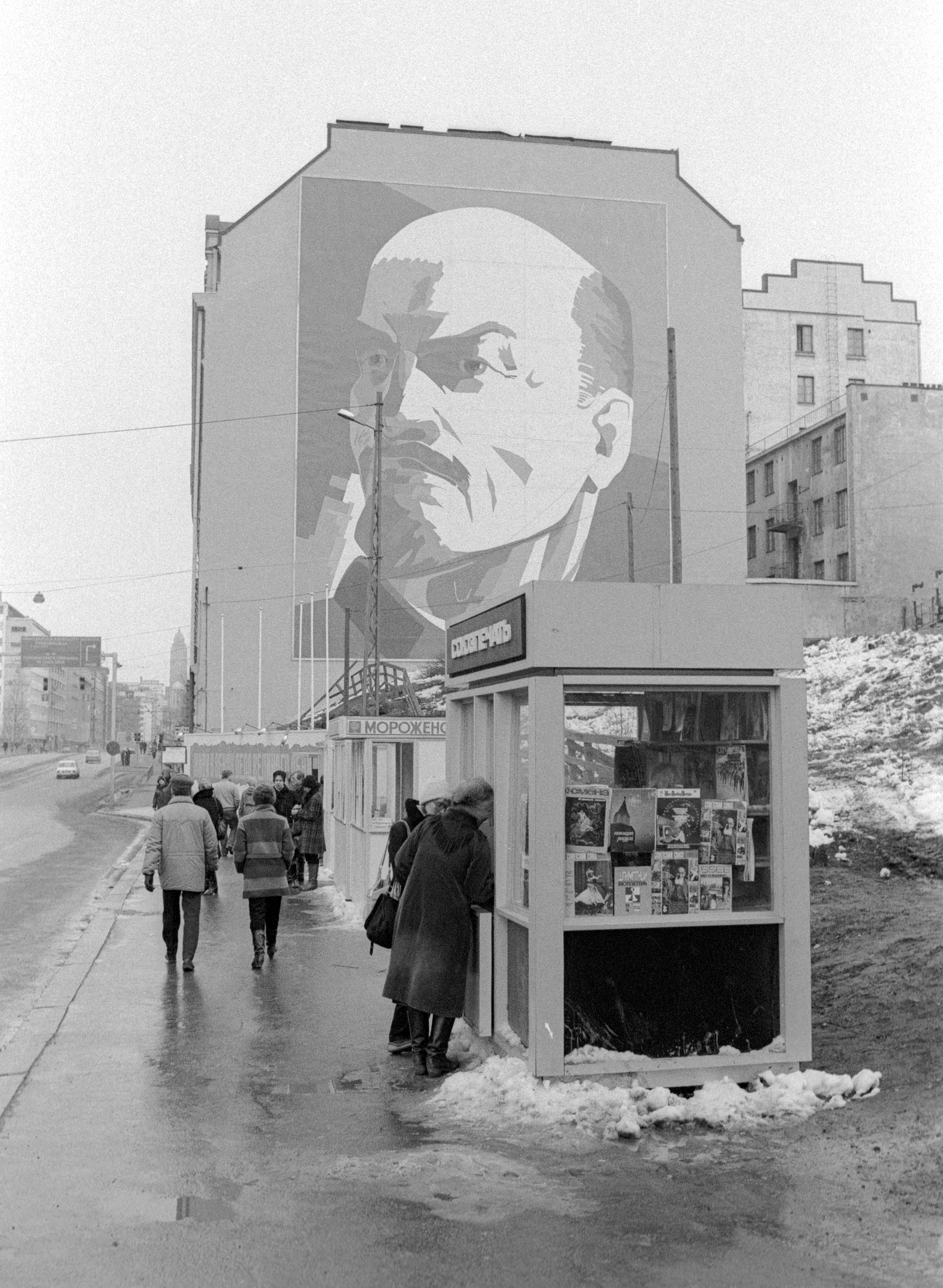
A mural of Lenin at Unioninkatu 45, one of the locations used in the shooting of Gorky Park

The Soviet Communist Party condemned the film as anti-Communist and anti-Soviet and denied the crew access to shoot in Moscow. Instead, shooting took place principally in Helsinki, Finland (with the Kaisaniemi public park doubling for the titular amusement park) and Stockholm, Sweden.

== Release ==
The film was released in the United States by Orion Pictures on December 16, 1983.

=== Home media ===
Gorky Park was released to DVD by MGM Home Entertainment on April 1, 2003, as a Region 1 widescreen DVD and to Blu-ray Disc by Kino Lorber (under license from MGM) on October 21, 2014.

== Reception ==
=== Box office ===
Gorky Park was a box office disappointment, barely earning back its $15 million budget.

=== Critical response ===
On the review aggregator website Rotten Tomatoes, 78% of 27 critics' reviews are positive, with an average rating of 6.6/10. Metacritic, which uses a weighted average, assigned the film a score of 60 out of 100, based on 12 critics, indicating "mixed or average" reviews.

Janet Maslin called it "a taut, clever thriller throughout, with Mr. Apted's direction establishing its intensity immediately and sustaining it well. Ralf G. Bode's cinematography and James Horner's score go a long way toward setting a hauntingly bleak mood, and the supporting players, particularly Brian Dennehy and Ian Bannen, are excellent". Though she found it odd that Hurt would affect an English accent, she found his performance "rivetingly strange".

Roger Ebert found the depiction of Soviet society to be the most interesting aspect of the film, and he credited Apted's direction for never letting the procedural lag. Ebert also praised the casting, even if it relied on typecasting an actor like Marvin. "He uses actors who are able to bring fully realized characters to the screen, so we don't have to stand around waiting for introductions".

=== Accolades ===
Award/association	Year	Category	Nominee	Result	Ref.
British Academy Film Awards	1985	Best Actor in a Supporting Role	Michael Elphick	Nominated	
Edgar Awards	1984	Best Motion Picture Screenplay	Dennis Potter	Won	
Golden Globe Awards	1984	Best Supporting Actress in a Motion Picture	Joanna Pacuła	Nominated	
