= Gypsy in Amber =

1971 mystery novel by Martin Cruz Smith

- First edition
- Author: Martin Cruz Smith
- Published: January 1, 1971, by (publ. Putnam)
- Media type: Print
- Pages: 192 pages
- ISBN: 0-399-10386-4
- Followed by: Canto for a Gypsy

Gypsy in Amber is a 1971 mystery novel by the American novelist Martin Cruz Smith as "Martin Smith". It was first published on January 1, 1971, by Putnam and was Smith's second novel and first mystery novel. It was nominated for an Edgar Award.

== Plot summary ==
The story's protagonist is Romano Grey, a gypsy antique expert who is pulled into a murder investigation when one of his friends dies in an automobile accident and is posthumously accused of the murder of a girl whose body, neatly sliced into six pieces, is found at the scene of the accident. Grey reappears in Canto for a Gypsy, published in 1972.

== Reception ==
The Montreal Gazette gave a positive review for the work, calling it "captivating".

== Adaptation ==
The novel was optioned for a television series in 1974 with the title Roman Grey. A pilot episode was filmed but not picked up for a full series. The pilot episode was shown as a TV movie entitled The Art of Crime and was poorly received.
