= Slocum Westerns =

Long-running series of Westerns

Slocum Westerns are the longest running series of Westerns ever written, encompassing over 400 books, all of which are published under the pen name Jake Logan. The books have been written by a number of authors, and all feature John Slocum as the protagonist.

== Main character ==
John Slocum is among the toughest of gunfighters. He is a mostly decent man who will do whatever it takes to survive life in the Western Frontier. A Confederate soldier who lost his ancestral home to carpetbaggers after the Civil War, Slocum left the South, never to return.

He has been a soldier, slave, stagecoach driver, shotgun guard, bank robber, lawman, pioneer, cowboy, shepherd, poor man, rich man, gambler, and drifter. His adventures occur in most of the American West.

== Target demographic ==
The books are claimed to be adult oriented, due to the presence of three explicitly described sex scenes in each of the numerous books; they were first published by Playboy Press.

== Authors ==
- Robert E. Vardeman (Dead Man's Spurs)
- Martin Cruz Smith (Ride for Revenge)
- Ronald Kelly (Slocum and the Nightriders) and (Slocum and the Gold Slaves)
- Robert Vaughan (Cheyenne Bloodbath)
- Jory Sherman (Sixguns at Silverado)
- James Reasoner (Slocum and the Texas Rose)
- Marcus Galloway (Slocum and the Witch of Westlake)
- Matthew P. Mayo (Slocum and the High-Rails Heiress)
