= Independence Square (novel) =

2023 book

- Author: Martin Cruz Smith
- Language: English
- Series: Arkady Renko #10
- Genre: Crime novel
- Publisher: Simon & Schuster
- Publication date: 2023
- Publication place: United States
- Pages: 272 pp
- ISBN: 9781982188313
- Preceded by: The Siberian Dilemma
- Followed by: Hotel Ukraine

Independence Square is a 2023 crime fiction novel by American author Martin Cruz Smith. It is the tenth of Smith's works to feature fictional detective Arkady Renko, published 42 years after Renko's first appearance in Gorky Park. It is set partially in Moscow and largely in Kyiv and Russian-occupied Crimea. The events of the novel occur against the backdrop of the lead-up to the Russian invasion of Ukraine in 2022.
