= Tatiana (novel) =

2013 crime novel by Martin Cruz Smith

- First edition
- Author: Martin Cruz Smith
- Language: English
- Series: Arkady Renko #8
- Genre: Crime novel
- Publisher: Simon & Schuster, Macmillan
- Publication date: 12 November 2013
- Publication place: United States
- Media type: Print (Hardcover/Softcover)
- Pages: 304 pp (hardback edition)
- ISBN: 978-1-8498-3810-8
- Preceded by: Three Stations
- Followed by: The Siberian Dilemma

Tatiana is a 2013 crime novel by Martin Cruz Smith set in Russia. It is the eighth novel to feature Detective-Investigator Arkady Renko, published 32 years after the initial novel of the Arkady Renko series, Gorky Park.

== Plot ==
Arkady Renko, a fictional investigator created by Martin Cruz Smith, appears in Tatiana, where he investigates a mystery set against the political and social conditions of contemporary Russia.

The fearless investigative reporter Tatiana Petrovna falls to her death from a sixth-story window in Moscow the same week that a mob billionaire, Grisha Grigorenko, is shot and buried with the trappings afforded minor royalty. No one makes the connection, but Arkady is transfixed by the tapes he discovers of Tatiana's voice, as she describes horrific crimes concealed by official cover stories.

The trail leads to Kaliningrad, a Cold War "secret city" and home of the Baltic Fleet, separated by hundreds of miles from the rest of Russia. Arkady delves into Tatiana's past and a surreal world of wandering dunes and amber mines. His only link is a notebook written in the personal code of a translator whose body is found in the dunes. Arkady's only hope of decoding the symbols lies in Zhenya, a gifted teenage chess hustler.

The story was inspired by the murder of Russian journalist Anna Politkovskaya in 2006.
