= Polar Star (novel) =

1989 crime novel by Martin Cruz Smith

- First edition
- Author: Martin Cruz Smith
- Language: English
- Series: Arkady Renko # 2
- Genre: Crime novel
- Published: 1989
- Publisher: Random House
- Publication place: United States
- Media type: Print (Hardcover, Paperback)
- Pages: 384pp (paperback edition)
- ISBN: 0-345-36765-0
- OCLC: 21957937
- LC Class: CPB Box no. 1797 vol. 10
- Preceded by: Gorky Park
- Followed by: Red Square

Polar Star is a 1989 crime novel by Martin Cruz Smith, set in the Soviet Union in the late 1980s. It is a sequel to Gorky Park and features former militsiya investigator Arkady Renko, taking place during the period of Perestroika.

== Background ==
After uncovering corruption in high places (in Gorky Park), Renko is dismissed from his job as a Moscow police investigator and is forced to accept a variety of menial jobs in remote parts of the Soviet Union. Finally, he finds himself gutting fish on a factory ship in the Bering Sea, in part to hide from the KGB, who have tried to kill him. The Soviet factory ship is part of a US-Soviet joint venture, with the US fishing vessels catching the fish and turning the catch over to the Soviets for processing (gutting, cleaning, and freezing). The other crew members have signed up with the prospect of a one-day stop at the American port of Dutch Harbor in the Aleutian Islands, with an extra salary allowance in US dollars to let them purchase Western goods such as VCRs and cassette tapes.

Then the body of a murdered female crew member is pulled up in the vessel's nets, and Renko reluctantly agrees to investigate after the ship's political commissar gives him no choice. But Renko's insistence on learning the truth behind her death, rather than allowing her murder to be covered up as a suicide, results in threats by the commissar to block the visit to the United States, which in turn causes the workers to threaten Renko.

== Plot ==
Arkady Renko, former Chief Investigator of the Moscow Town Prosecutor's Office, is serving a self-imposed exile in Siberia to avoid being detained for his actions in Gorky Park several years earlier, despite the Soviet Union's ostensibly increasing liberalization. He procures menial employment as a fish gutter on the "slime line" of a large Arctic Sea factory ship called the Polar Star, part of a joint Soviet-American fishing exercise within detente.

He is brought to the attention of Viktor Marchuk, the ship's captain, after a young woman named Zina Patiashvili is found dead in a net full of freshly-caught fish. Due to his past as a homicide investigator, he is given the task of finding out what happened to her—to the dislike of political officer Volovoi. Hess, the ship's chief electrical engineer—an elaborate blind for his espionage activities—welcomes Arkady more warmly. Researching the girl's background, he discovers an open and somewhat radical Georgian personality, known for her many lovers (including the Captain, before she became a crew member) and fondness for underground music. Looking into her death also attracts the attention of the ship's main gang, led by Karp Korobetz—the ship's leading fisher and Arkady's former prisoner. The American corporate representative on board, Susan Hightower, takes an interest in the case.

Arkady grows weary of the investigation, largely due to the obstructive actions of many of his shipmates—many of whom are concerned that it will delay a long-awaited shore leave at Dutch Harbour. Renko finally decides to go along with the original verdict of suicide, letting the ship's crew disembark. Though lacking proper authorization to go ashore himself, Arkady is sponsored in an impromptu shore leave by "Fleet Electrical Engineer" Hess.

While there, he starts to enter into a relationship with Susan before encountering Volovoi in a nearby dwelling. Volovoi threatens him but is killed by a disgruntled Karp, who then locks Arkady in and sets the building on fire. The investigator manages to escape and "accidentally" falls into the water to wash off any incriminating odors. Questions are raised, but nothing is decided. Arkady has no evidence against Karp and, having already survived an attempt on his life, fears he will be attacked again. Entering the icy North, the American trawler freezes into the ice whilst trailing the Polar Star. Arkady learns of Karp's relationship with Zina and her attempts to defect aboard the American ship, as well the secret spy cable running underneath the vessel that is operated by Hess. Arkady ventures out into the ice towards the American ship, and Karp casually follows and eventually catches up with him. On board they find evidence that Zina was killed and stowed on board in one of the lockers. Arkady also finds indications that the Americans were deceiving Hess by transmitting the acoustic signatures of numerous other decommissioned American vessels.

Karp kills the killer, scaring off the Americans and allowing him and Renko to escape. After a final foiled attempt to finish Arkady off, Karp finally decides, with draconian Russian justice awaiting him back home, to drown himself in the icy water. When the Polar Star returns to Vladivostok, Arkady says farewell to Susan and his fellow crewmen, suddenly finding himself in the party's favour again.

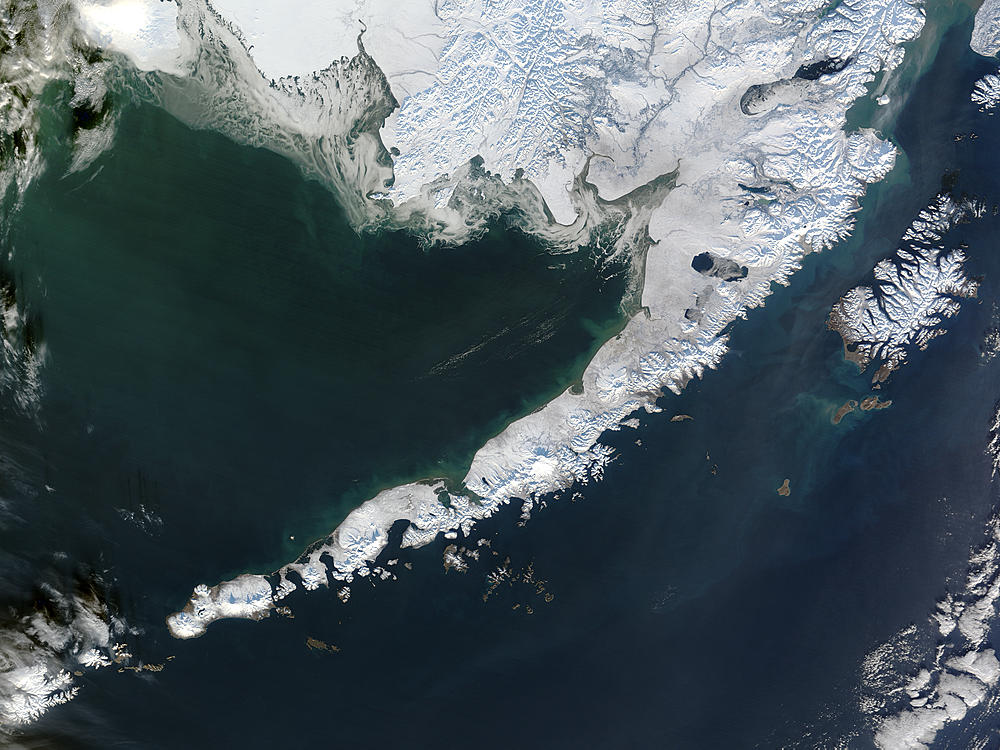
The Aleutian Islands.

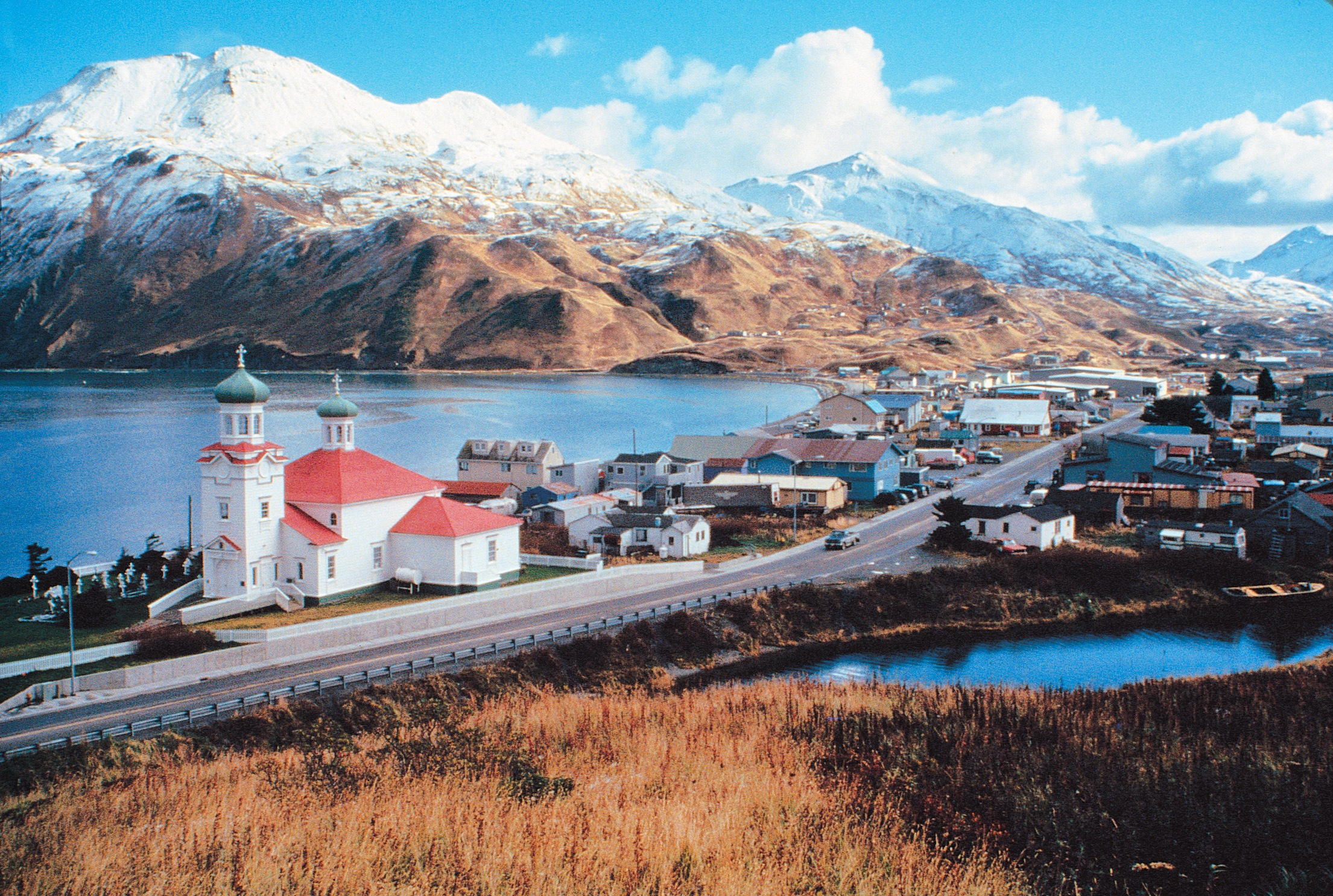
Dutch Harbor, Alaska with the Russian Orthodox church in the foreground.
