= 1979 Stinkers Bad Movie Awards =

Award show honoring the worst in film

The 1979 Stinkers Bad Movie Awards were released by the Hastings Bad Cinema Society in 1980 to honour the worst films the film industry had to offer in 1979. The ballot was later revisited and the expanded version was released in late 2004. Listed as follows are the original ballot's picks for Worst Picture and its dishonourable mentions, which are films that were considered for Worst Picture but ultimately failed to make the final ballot (17 total), and all nominees included in the expanded ballot. All winners are highlighted.

== Original Ballot ==
=== Worst Picture ===
Film	Production company(s)
Nightwing	Columbia Pictures
Beyond the Poseidon Adventure	Warner Bros.
The Concorde... Airport '79	Universal Pictures
Hardcore	Columbia Pictures
Star Trek: The Motion Picture	Paramount Pictures

==== Dishonourable Mentions ====
- 1941 (Universal/Columbia)
- Americathon (United Artists)
- The Amityville Horror (American International)
- The Black Hole (Disney)
- Bloodline (Paramount)
- The Champ (United Artists)
- The Electric Horseman (Columbia/Universal)
- Hurricane (Paramount)
- The Jerk (Universal)
- Just You and Me, Kid (Columbia)
- Love at First Bite (American International)
- The Main Event (Warner Bros.)
- Meteor (American International)
- More American Graffiti (Universal)
- Roller Boogie (United Artists)
- Sammy Stops the World (Special Event)
- The Warriors (Paramount)

== Expanded Ballot ==
=== Worst Picture ===
Film	Production company(s)
The Main Event	Warner Bros.
1941	Universal Pictures
Attack of the Killer Tomatoes	NAI Entertainment
Can I Do It... 'Til I Need Glasses?	National American Films
The Concorde... Airport '79	Universal Pictures

==== Dishonourable Mentions ====
- The Amityville Horror (American International)
- The Bell Jar (AVCO Embassy)
- Beyond the Poseidon Adventure (Warner Bros.)
- The Black Hole (Disney)
- Bloodline (Paramount)
- Butch and Sundance: The Early Days (Fox)
- City on Fire (Astral Films)
- The Frisco Kid (Warner Bros.)
- Hardcore (Columbia)
- Love and Bullets (Associated Film Distributors)
- More American Graffiti (Universal)
- Nightwing (Columbia)
- Penitentiary (The Jerry Gross Organization)
- Roller Boogie (United Artists)
- Scavenger Hunt (Fox)
- The Villain (Columbia)

=== Worst Director ===
Director	Film
Howard Zieff	The Main Event
John DeBello	Attack of the Killer Tomatoes
David Lowell Rich	The Concorde... Airport '79
I. Robert Levy	Can I Do It... 'Til I Need Glasses?
Russ Meyer	Beneath the Valley of the Ultra-Vixens

==== Dishonourable Mentions ====
- Robert Aldrich for The Frisco Kid
- Irwin Allen for Beyond the Poseidon Adventure
- Robert Altman for Quintet
- Dom DeLuise for Hot Stuff
- Stan Dragoti for Love at First Bite
- Arthur Hiller for Nightwing
- Neal Israel for Americathon
- Richard Lester for Butch and Sundance: The Early Days
- Hal Needham for The Villain
- Gary Nelson for The Black Hole
- B.W.L. Norton for More American Graffiti
- Stuart Rosenberg for The Amityville Horror and Love and Bullets
- Paul Schrader for Hardcore
- Michael Schultz for Scavenger Hunt
- Steven Spielberg for 1941
- Sylvester Stallone for Rocky II
- Robert Wise for Star Trek: the Motion Picture

=== Worst Actor ===
Actor	Film
Robby Benson	Walk Proud
James Brolin	The Amityville Horror
Ryan O'Neal	The Main Event
George C. Scott	Hardcore
Sylvester Stallone	Rocky II

==== Dishonourable Mentions ====
- Dan Aykroyd in 1941
- Jim Bray in Roller Boogie
- Charles Bronson in Love and Bullets
- Dom DeLuise in Hot Stuff
- Harrison Ford in The Frisco Kid and Hanover Street
- Gil Gerard in Buck Rogers in the 25th Century
- Charles Grodin in Sunburn
- Ken Kerr in Beneath the Valley of the Ultra-Vixens
- Steve Martin in The Jerk
- Charles Martin Smith in More American Graffiti
- Sylvester Stallone in Rocky II
- Jon Voight in The Champ
- Gene Wilder in The Frisco Kid

=== Worst Actress ===
Actress	Film
Barbra Streisand	The Main Event
Linda Blair	Roller Boogie
Erin Gray	Buck Rogers in the 25th Century
Margot Kidder	The Amityville Horror
Brooke Shields	Just You and Me, Kid and Wanda Nevada

==== Dishonourable Mentions ====
- Joan Collins in The Bitch
- Faye Dunaway in The Champ
- Farrah Fawcett-Majors in Sunburn
- Susan Saint James in Love at First Bite
- Lynn-Holly Johnson in Ice Castles

=== Worst Supporting Actor ===
Actor	Film
Ricky Schroder	The Champ
John Belushi	1941
Richard Masur	Hanover Street and Scavenger Hunt
Pepe Serna	Walk Proud
Max Wright	All That Jazz

==== Dishonourable Mentions ====
- James Coco in Scavenger Hunt
- Matt Craven in Meatballs
- Eddie Deezen in 1941
- Alix Elias in Rock 'n' Roll High School
- Gert Frobe in Bloodline
- Walter Koenig in Star Trek: the Motion Picture
- Strother Martin in Nightwing
- Jeff Nicholson in The Double McGuffin
- Avery Schreiber in Scavenger Hunt
- Rod Steiger in The Amityville Horror and Love and Bullets
- Erland Van Lidth De Jeude in The Wanderers
- Jonathan Winters in The Fish That Saved Pittsburgh
- Burt Young in Rocky II

=== Worst Supporting Actress ===
Actress	Film
Margaux Hemingway	Killer Fish
Zane Buzby	Americathon
Ilah Davis	Hardcore
Colleen Dewhurst	Ice Castles
Helen Shaver	The Amityville Horror

==== Dishonourable Mentions ====
- Ruth Buzzi in The Apple Dumpling Gang Rides Again
- Joan Collins in Sunburn
- Bo Derek in 10
- Lesley-Ann Down in The First Great Train Robbery and Hanover Street
- Patti D'Arbanville in The Main Event
- Sally Field in Beyond the Poseidon Adventure
- Ava Gardner in City on Fire
- Ruth Gordon in Scavenger Hunt
- Persis Khambatta in Star Trek: the Motion Picture
- Cloris Leachman in Scavenger Hunt
- Linda Manz in The Wanderers
- Kitten Natividad in Beneath the Valley of the Ultra-Vixens
- Bernadette Peters in The Jerk
- Ann Reinking in All That Jazz

=== Worst Screenplay ===
Film	Production company(s)
The Main Event	Warner Bros.
1941	Universal
Americathon	United Artists
Beneath the Valley of the Ultra-Vixens	Signal 166
The Concorde... Airport '79	Universal

==== Dishonourable Mentions ====
- The Amityville Horror (American International)
- The Bell Jar (AVCO Embassy)
- The Bitch (Thorn EMI)
- The Black Hole (Disney)
- Bloodline (Paramount)
- Buck Rogers in the 25th Century (Universal)
- The Frisco Kid (Warner Bros.)
- Hardcore (Columbia)
- Love and Bullets (Associated Film Distributors)
- More American Graffiti (Universal)
- Nightwing (Columbia)
- Rocky II (United Artists)
- Scavenger Hunt (Fox)

=== Worst Sequel ===
Film	Production company(s)
The Concorde... Airport '79	Universal
Beyond the Poseidon Adventure	Warner Bros.
Butch and Sundance: The Early Days	Fox
More American Graffiti	Universal
Rocky II	United Artists

==== Dishonourable Mentions ====
- Beneath the Valley of the Ultra-Vixens (Signal 166)
- The Bitch (Thorn EMI)
- Moonraker (United Artists)
- Zulu Dawn (American Cinema)

=== Most Painfully Unfunny Comedy ===
Film	Production company(s)
Can I Do It... 'Til I Need Glasses?	National American Films
1941	Universal
The Jerk	Universal
Love at First Bite	American International
The Main Event	Warner Bros.

==== Dishonourable Mentions ====
- Americathon (United Artists)
- Beneath the Valley of the Ultra-Vixens (Signal 166)
- Buck Rogers in the 25th Century (Universal)
- Hot Stuff (Columbia)
- More American Graffiti (Universal)
- Scavenger Hunt (Fox)
- Spaced Out (Miramax)
- The Villain (Columbia)

=== Worst Song or Song Performance in a Film or Its End Credits ===
Song and Artist	Film
"Adios Yesterday" by Robby Benson	Walk Proud
"Better Than Ever" by Candice Bergen	Starting Over
"Don't You Ever Say No" by Zane Buzby	Americathon
"Live (For Today)" by Dion Pride	The Double McGuffin
"Puberty Love" by Matt Cameron as "Ronny Desmond"	Attack of the Killer Tomatoes

==== Dishonourable Mentions ====
- "Close Enough For Love" by Patti Brooks from Agatha
- "Don't Call It Love" by Henry Mancini from 10
- "Hell on Wheels" by Cher from Roller Boogie
- "Help Yourself To Me" by Pam Miller & Danny Bonaduce from H.O.T.S.
- "I'll Never Say Goodbye" by Melissa Manchester from The Promise
- "It Goes Like It Goes" by Jennifer Warnes from Norma Rae
- "The Main Event/Fight" by Barbra Streisand from The Main Event
- "Meatballs" by Rick Dees from Meatballs
- "Mighty, Mighty Pisces" by The Sylvers from The Fish That Saved Pittsburgh
- "Moonraker" by Shirley Bassey from Moonraker
- "Sittin' Here at Midnight" by Bill Thornbury from Phantasm
- "Somebody Who Really Cares" by Dion Pride from The Double McGuffin
- "Suspension (Far Beyond)" by Kipp Lennon from Buck Rogers in the 25th Century
- "There's Enough For Everyone" by Scatman Crothers from Scavenger Hunt
- "'Til the End" by Peter Matz from The Prize Fighter
- "The Villain" by Mel Tillis from The Villain
- "Wanda's Wish" by Asleep at the Wheel from Wanda Nevada

=== Most Intrusive Musical Score ===
==== Dishonourable Mentions ====
- The Black Hole (Disney)
- The Champ (United Artists)
- Disco Godfather (Transvue Pictures)
- The Driller Killer (Rochelle Films)
- The Electric Horseman (Columbia/Universal)
- Hardcore (Columbia)
- Ice Castles (Columbia)
- Moonraker (United Artists)
- Zulu Dawn (American Cinema)
- Note: no nominees and winners were given for this category – just dishonourable mentions.

=== Worst On-Screen Couple ===
Couple	Film
Barbra Streisand and Ryan O'Neal	The Main Event
James Brolin and Margot Kidder	The Amityville Horror
Steve Martin and Bernadette Peters	The Jerk
Brooke Shields and George Burns or Peter Fonda	Just You and Me, Kid and Wanda Nevada
Gene Wilder and Harrison Ford	The Frisco Kid

==== Dishonourable Mentions ====
- Robby Benson & Lynn-Holly Johnson in Ice Castles
- Linda Blair & Jim Bray in Roller Boogie
- Keith Carradine & Monica Vitti in An Almost Perfect Affair
- Joan Collins & any male in The Bitch
- Tim Conway & Don Knotts in The Apple Dumpling Gang Rides Again
- Bobby DiCicco & Perry Lang in 1941
- Harrison Ford & Lesley-Anne Down in Hanover Street
- Charles Grodin & Farrah Fawcett-Majors in Sunburn
- William Katt & Tom Berenger in Butch and Sundance: The Early Days
- Richard Kiel & Blanche Ravalec in Moonraker
- Roger Perry & Beverly Garland in Roller Boogie
- Robert Redford & Jane Fonda in The Electric Horseman
- Jon Voight & Faye Dunaway in The Champ
- Persis Khambatta & Stephen Collins in Star Trek: the Motion Picture
- Erland Van Lidth De Jeude & Linda Manz in The Wanderers

=== Least "Special" Special Effects ===
Film	Production company(s)
The Concorde... Airport '79	Universal
Buck Rogers in the 25th Century	Universal Pictures
City on Fire	Astral Films
Love at First Bite	American International
Nightwing	Columbia Pictures

=== Worst Fake Accent (Male) ===
Actor	Film
Robby Benson	Walk Proud
Greg Hodges	The Double McGuffin
Richard Lawson	The Main Event
Ricky Schroder	The Champ
Gene Wilder	The Frisco Kid

=== Worst Fake Accent (Female) ===
Actress	Film
Zane Buzby	Americathon
Faye Dunaway	The Champ
Linda Manz	The Wanderers
Penny Marshall	1941
Lisa Whelchel	The Double McGuffin

=== Worst On-Screen Group ===
Group	Film
The Accent-Challenged Teen Detectives	The Double McGuffin
The Annoying Passengers	The Concorde... Airport '79
The Greedy Heirs	Scavenger Hunt
Kitten Natividad and the Ultra-Vixens	Beneath the Valley of the Ultra-Vixens
The World's Oldest Looking Gang Members	Walk Proud, The Wanderers, and The Warriors

=== Most Annoying Non-Human Character ===
Non-Human	Film
Twiki (voice by Mel Blanc) and Dr. Theo	Buck Rogers in the 25th Century
Bob (voice by Slim Pickens)	The Black Hole
C.H.O.M.P.S. the Robot Dog	C.H.O.M.P.S.
Muffet the Robot Dagget	Battlestar Galactica
V.I.N.C.E.N.T. (voice by Roddy McDowell)	The Black Hole

==== Dishonourable Mentions ====
- Dickey the Monkey in The Attic
- The Killer Bats in Nightwing
- The Killer Bear Monster in Prophecy
- Marjeeb's Pet Monkey in Arabian Adventure
- Maximilian in The Black Hole
- The Vger Probe (Persis Khambatta) in Star Trek: The Motion Picture
