= Rose (novel) =

1996 novel by Martin Cruz Smith

- First edition cover
- Author: Martin Cruz Smith
- Publisher: Random House
- Publication date: May 1, 1996
- ISBN: 0-679-42661-2

Rose is a 1996 novel by American writer Martin Cruz Smith. The story is set in 1872 Wigan, Lancashire, England, a district with extensive coal mines.

== Synopsis ==
Jonathan Blair, a mining engineer, returns from Africa's Gold Coast and, on finding his native England utterly depressing, falls into melancholy and alcoholism. Blair wishes desperately to return to Africa, so, in exchange, he agrees to investigate the disappearance of a local curate engaged to marry the daughter of Blair's patron. With the unexpected assistance of Rose, a Wigan 'pit brow girl', Blair solves the mystery and, in the process, finds himself as well.

== Reviews ==
- "Rose, a richly textured Victorian thriller from Martin Cruz Smith" by Martin Cruz Smith in Time. 147, no. 23, (1996): 73,
- Review by E. Weber, NEW YORK TIMES BOOK REVIEW, 101, no. 24, (1996): 50
- Review by David Horspool in TLS, the Times literary supplement. no. 4861, (1996): 22
