= December 6 (novel) =

Novel by Martin Cruz Smith

- First edition
- Author: Martin Cruz Smith
- Language: English
- Publisher: Simon & Schuster
- Publication date: 30 September 2002
- Publication place: United States
- Media type: Print (Hardcover, Paperback)
- Pages: 352 (hardback)
- ISBN: 0-684-87253-6

December 6 is a 2003 thriller novel by American author Martin Cruz Smith.The novel was published in England under the name Tokyo Station.

== Plot summary ==
In late 1941, Harry Niles owns a bar for American and European expatriates, journalists, and diplomats, in Tokyo's entertainment district, called the "Happy Paris". With only 24 hours until Japanese fighters and bombers attack Pearl Harbor, Niles has to consult with the local US ambassador, break up with a desperate lover, evade the police, escape the vengeance of an aggrieved samurai officer and leave the island, the exit points from which are all closed. Having grown up in Tokyo, Niles is fluent in the Japanese language and culture, and is highly streetwise.
