= The Champ (1979 film) =

Remake by Franco Zeffirelli

- Theatrical release poster by Richard Amsel
- Directed by: Franco Zeffirelli
- Written by: Frances Marion; Walter Newman
- Based on: The Champ; 1931 film by King Vidor
- Produced by: Dyson Lovell
- Starring: Jon Voight; Faye Dunaway; Ricky Schroder; Jack Warden; Arthur Hill
- Cinematography: Fred J. Koenekamp
- Edited by: Michael J. Sheridan
- Music by: Dave Grusin
- Production company: Metro-Goldwyn-Mayer
- Distributed by: United Artists (United States/Canada); Cinema International Corporation (International)
- Release date: April 4, 1979
- Running time: 122 minutes
- Country: United States
- Language: English
- Budget: $8 million
- Box office: $65 million

The Champ is a 1979 American drama sports film directed by Franco Zeffirelli and a remake of the 1931 Academy Award-winning film of the same name directed by King Vidor. It stars Jon Voight as Billy Flynn, a former boxer who attempts to support his son (Ricky Schroder) and reconcile with his ex-wife (Faye Dunaway) by fighting in the ring again.

The Champ was released by United Artists on April 4, 1979, with Cinema International Corporation releasing in other territories. The film received mixed reviews from critics and grossed $65 million against an $8 million budget. The film is the last featuring Joan Blondell to be released during her lifetime.

For his performance, Schroder won Golden Globe Award for New Star of the Year – Actor, making him the youngest winner in the history of the Golden Globe.

== Plot ==
Ex-boxing champion Billy Flynn is trying to settle down as a horse trainer in Hialeah, Florida, after giving up his boxing title. A boxer propositions Billy about a future match, and he shows up at the gym with his son T.J., who calls him Champ. The prospective opponent does not show up and Billy angrily storms off leaving T.J. behind. Billy's friends bring a drunken Billy home. T.J. explains to their neighbor Josie that Charlie and his friends bought Billy four beers as a celebration.

Billy buys T.J. his own horse named "She's a Lady" from gambling earnings. Billy enters Lady in a race, and she collapses, scraping her leg. Annie, Billy's ex-wife, had placed a bet on the horse and arrives after Lady's fall. She learns that Billy told T.J. she was dead and had deserted them. Annie invites T.J. to her cruise ship.

When Annie's current husband asks Billy to reveal that Annie is T.J.'s mother, he refuses. Billy loses a bet on T.J.'s horse and Whitey forces him to transfer ownership of the horse to him. Billy is arrested after assaulting Whitey and fighting a police officer. In custody, he tells T.J. he will have to live with Annie. T.J. refuses to leave, and Billy slaps him. Annie tries to comfort T.J. and accidentally reveals he's her son. T.J. refuses to accept her as his mother. Billy is released and promises never to leave T.J. again. Annie asks Billy to explain to T.J. why she has been absent from his life. After another fight, Billy and Annie reconcile as friends.

Jackie warns Billy his age and constant headaches leave him at risk of death if he boxes again but reluctantly agrees to train him for the proposed fight. Before the match begins, T.J. sees that Billy's opponent is much stronger than Billy. Billy wins the first two rounds, but receives many blows to the head as the fight goes on, and he gets progressively weaker. The doctor examines Billy between rounds and explains he's close to stopping the fight. Billy continues to receive sharp blows but finds enough strength to knock out his opponent.

Billy collapses on the way back to his dressing room, and calls for T.J. He asks if he's happy his father won. T.J. replies "The champ always comes through." Billy loses consciousness and T.J. tries frantically to rouse him. Jackie tells T.J. that his father has died. T.J. says goodbye to Billy and is embraced by Annie.

== Cast ==
- Jon Voight as Billy Flynn ("Champ")
- Faye Dunaway as Annie Phillips
- Ricky Schroder as Timothy Joseph "T.J." Flynn
- Jack Warden as Jackie
- Joan Blondell as Dolly Kenyon
- Arthur Hill as Mike Phillips
- Strother Martin as Riley
- Elisha Cook Jr. as Georgie
- Stefan Gierasch as Charlie Goodman
- Mary Jo Catlett as Josie
- Kristoff St. John as Sonny
- Dana Elcar as Hoffmaster, an attorney
- Randall "Tex" Cobb as Bowers, Billy's final opponent

Robert Redford turned down the lead role. Ryan O'Neal signed to play the lead but wanted his son Griffin as T.J. After the director refused, claiming that Griffin was too old, O'Neal withdrew from the project. The filmmakers conducted a six-month talent search with thousands of applicants to cast the role of T.J., and Schroder was chosen immediately after his audition.

== Production ==
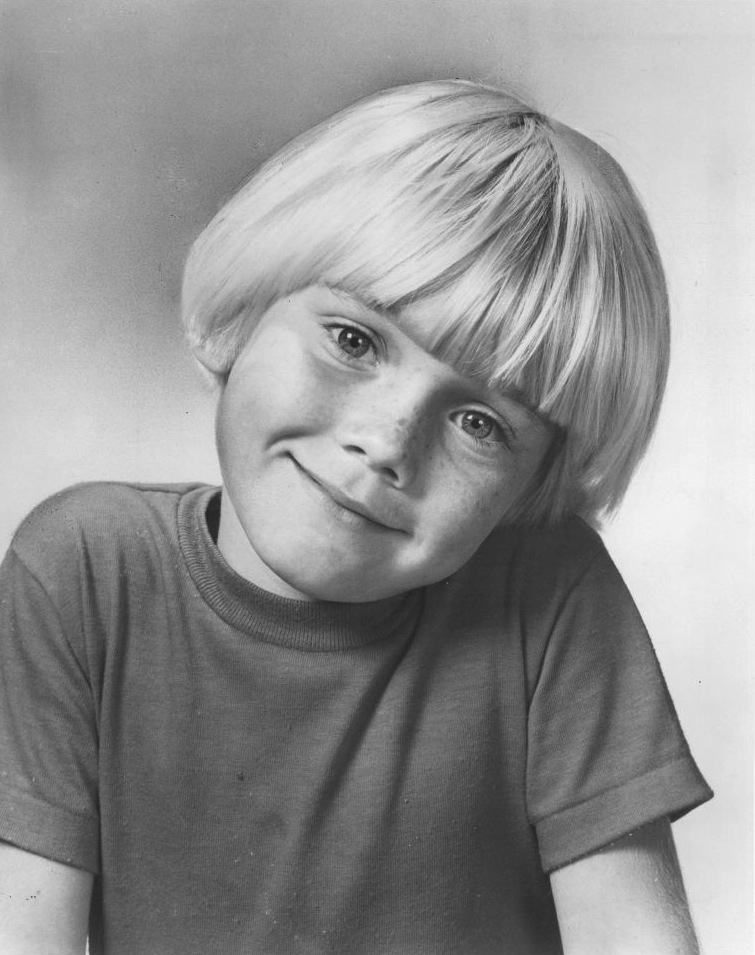
Child star Ricky Schroeder, who won a Golden Globe for his role in The Champ

Director Franco Zeffirelli said that he was inspired to remake the original film after seeing it again on television. It had first made an impression on him as a child because of the parallels between his own troubled youth and that of the boy in the story.

== Reception ==
=== Critical response ===
Michael Booth of The Denver Post wrote positively of the film: "Director Franco Zeffirelli makes beautiful pictures; from Shakespeare to the life of St. Francis. In 'The Champ', he imbues Florida with some old time movie magic, retelling the tale of a washed-up former boxer trying to shed booze and gambling to win back his son."

Time Out London was critical of the film, calling it "a pointless update of King Vidor's '30s weepie."

In The New York Times, critic Vincent Canby strongly panned the film, stating that "the most offputting thing about such canny, tear-stained movies as 'The Champ' is not their naïveté but their unholy sophistication. These movies don't mean to deal with the world as it really is, but as it should be, a place where there's no pile-up of emotional garbage too big that it can't be washed clean by a good cry. My problem with 'The Champ' is that I didn't cry. The garbage accumulated."

In a positive review, Variety's Dale Pollock wrote: "Hardly anyone can resist a cute kid, and with Ricky Schroder, 'The Champ' has the most irresistible moppet seen on the screen in decades. Franco Zeffirelli makes an auspicious debut on these shores with his first American film, bolstered by earnest performances from Jon Voight and Faye Dunaway."

Gene Siskel of the Chicago Tribune awarded the film two and a half stars out of four and questioned the point of remaking the original, adding: "Of course, that question would be of secondary importance if 'The Champ' were an effective tearjerker. But it's not. For no apparent reason, the original simple story has been lengthened to a full 35 minutes. With catastrophe now piled upon catastrophe, 'The Champ' seems to be begging us to cry."

Charles Champlin of the Los Angeles Times wrote in a generally positive review that "Zeffirelli has made 'The Champ' work again, on his and its extravagant terms. It requires, makes no mistake, a willing surrender to those terms of sentimental romance and is less piquantly seasoned with wry worldliness than 'Heaven Can Wait,' for example, whose romantic idealism it shares. But, with due allowances, 'The Champ' is a strongly affecting experience for those who want to be moved."

Gary Arnold of The Washington Post opined that the film "slogs on for about two reels too many, concluding on a note of utterly contrived tragedy that should make just about everyone feel wretchedly deceived."

Clyde Jeavons of The Monthly Film Bulletin wrote: "Whether the unabashed sentimentality of Zeffirelli's remake of King Vidor's 1931 was deliberate or a misinterpretation of mood, one thing is certain; rarely has the screen been quite so awash with tears for so little apparent reason."

Film historian Leonard Maltin awarded the picture 1.5 out of a possible 4 stars, calling it "Hopeless...Voight acts too smart for us to believe he's a dumb pug, while Dunaway acts as if she wants to bed down with their kid; Schroeder cries (and cries) convincingly, but this still isn't exactly Zeffirelli's finest hour."

At review aggregator Rotten Tomatoes, the film holds an approval rating of 40% based on 25 reviews, with an average rating of 5.2/10. At Metacritic, the film has a weighted average score of 38 out of 100 based on eight critics, indicating "generally unfavorable reviews".

The Champ has been listed among the most depressing films, and the final scene has been used in psychology experiments to elicit strong emotional responses. In 1988, psychologists conducted a study involving more than 250 film clips shown to 500 people. The study concluded that the last three minutes of The Champ, in which T.J. sees his father win his comeback fight and then die, elicited the saddest response from a majority of the subjects.

=== Box office ===
At the American box office, the film performed modestly at first but went on to become MGM's greatest international hit in 14 years, grossing $30.4 million in the U.S. and Canada and more than $35 million elsewhere, including more than $10 million in Japan. By September 1979, The Champ had registered as MGM's fourth-greatest success in its history. In South Korea, the film was a major box-office success. It opened at the Jungang Theater in Seoul in September 1979 and remained in theatrical circulation through the 1981 Lunar New Year season, attracting approximately 560,000 admissions. Cine21 records a total of 559,691 admissions for the film.

=== Awards and nominations ===
Award	Category	Nominee(s)	Result	Ref.
Academy Awards	Best Original Score	Dave Grusin	Nominated	
Golden Globe Awards	Best Actor in a Motion Picture – Drama	Jon Voight	Nominated	
Golden Globe Awards	New Star of the Year – Actor	Ricky Schroder	Won	
Japan Academy Film Prize	Best Foreign Language Film		Nominated	
Turkish Film Critics Association Awards	Best Foreign Film		9th Place	
Stinkers Bad Movie Awards	Worst Supporting Actor	Ricky Schroder	Won	
Stinkers Bad Movie Awards	Worst Fake Accent – Male	Ricky Schroder	Nominated	
Stinkers Bad Movie Awards	Worst Fake Accent – Female	Faye Dunaway	Nominated	
Young Artist Awards	Best Motion Picture Featuring Youth		Nominated	
Young Artist Awards	Best Juvenile Actor in A Motion Picture	Ricky Schroder	Nominated	

== Release ==
The film was released on DVD on May 5, 2015 as part of the Warner Archive Collection.

== See also ==
- List of boxing films
