= Canto for a Gypsy =

1972 novel by Martin Cruz Smith

- First edition
- Author: Martin Cruz Smith
- Language: English
- Genre: Mystery
- Publisher: New York: Putnam
- Publication date: 1972
- Publication place: United States
- Media type: Print (hardback & paperback)
- Pages: 191
- ISBN: 978-0-399-11024-5
- Preceded by: Gypsy in Amber

Canto for a Gypsy, published in 1972, is the second novel by Martin Cruz Smith (under the name "Martin Smith"). It is the follow-up to Gypsy in Amber and also has Romano Grey as the main character.

== Plot ==
The priceless Royal Crown of Hungary was on display in St Patrick's Cathedral in New York. Everybody wants the legendary crown of Saint Stephen for their own reasons. For the Hungarian government it is a symbol of their national greatness. Exiled rebels want it to rob the Communists of their pleasure, while an ex-Nazi art plunderer wants it to settle a very old score. Guarded by many, including the NYPD and the gypsy, Roman Grey, a heist was impossible. But it happened, and murder, mayhem and all hell broke loose... and only Grey knows the crown's true centuries old secret.
