= Three Stations =

2010 crime novel by Martin Cruz Smith

- Author: Martin Cruz Smith
- Language: English
- Series: Arkady Renko # 7
- Genre: Crime novel
- Published: 10 August 2010 Simon & Schuster, Macmillan
- Publication place: United States
- Media type: Print (Hardcover/Softcover)
- Pages: 256 pp (hardback edition)
- ISBN: 0-7432-7674-4
- Preceded by: Stalin's Ghost
- Followed by: Tatiana

Three Stations is a crime novel by Martin Cruz Smith set in Russia circa 2010. It is the seventh novel to feature Detective-Investigator Arkady Renko, published 29 years after the initial novel of the Renko series, Gorky Park.

== Plot ==
The title refers to the three Moscow railway stations, Leningrad Station, Kazansky Station and Yaroslavl Station situated on Komsomolskaya Square, also often referred to as Three Stations Square.

A teenage mother arrives at Three Stations, but her baby is stolen. The only person to help her is Zhenya, the young chess hustler who is a sometime ward of Arkady Renko, the police investigator. Meanwhile, Arkady tries to prove that the overdose death of a young prostitute in the station is nothing of the sort, and is suspended for his trouble. A billionaire casino owner with financial troubles offers to hire Arkady, but the latter can trust no-one. Thugs, dwarves, ballerinas, Central Asians and a gang of homeless tweens complicate matters still further.
