= Arkady Renko =

Fictional character in crime novels by Martin Cruz Smith

- Arkady Renko character
- First appearance: Gorky Park (1981)
- Last appearance: Hotel Ukraine (2025)
- Created by: Martin Cruz Smith
- Portrayed by: William Hurt (film)

In-universe information
- Gender: Male
- Occupation: Detective
- Nationality: Soviet/Russian

Arkady Renko (Russian: Аркадий Ренько) is a fictional detective who is the central character of eleven novels by the late American writer Martin Cruz Smith.

== Character timeline ==
In Gorky Park, the first novel, he is a chief investigator for the Soviet Militsiya in Moscow, where he is in charge of homicide investigations. In the sequels, he takes on roles varying from a militiaman to a worker on a fish processing ship in the Arctic.

Born into the nomenklatura, Arkady is the son of Red Army General Kiril Renko, an unrepentant Stalinist also known as "the Butcher", who sees Arkady as a bitter failure for choosing the simple life of a policeman over a military career, or even a career in the Communist Party. Arkady was also never able to forgive himself for indirectly and unwittingly helping his mother commit suicide (he helped her gather the rocks she used to drown herself with in the lake at their family estate when he was a young boy). Wary of the official lies of Soviet society, Arkady exposes corruption and dishonesty on the part of influential and well-protected members of the elite, regardless of the consequences. When exposed to Western capitalist society, he finds it to be equally corrupt and returns to the Soviet Union.

The first three books published between 1981 and 1992 form a trilogy culminating with the fall of the Soviet Union, at the August Coup in 1991. The action in Gorky Park takes place in the Soviet Union and in the US, Polar Star on board a Soviet fishing vessel in the Bering Sea, and Red Square in West Germany and Mikhail Gorbachev's perestroika-era Soviet Union. Havana Bay is set in Cuba; Wolves Eat Dogs is set in Moscow and in the areas affected by the Chernobyl disaster. Stalin's Ghost, published in 2007, returns Arkady to a Russia now presided over by Vladimir Putin, followed by Three Stations published in 2010, Tatiana in 2013, The Siberian Dilemma in 2019, Independence Square in 2023, and Hotel Ukraine in 2025.

== The Arkady Renko novels ==
1. Gorky Park (1981)
2. Polar Star (1989)
3. Red Square (1992)
4. Havana Bay (1999)
5. Wolves Eat Dogs (2004)
6. Stalin's Ghost (2007)
7. Three Stations (2010)
8. Tatiana (2013)
9. The Siberian Dilemma (2019)
10. Independence Square (2023)
11. Hotel Ukraine (2025)

== Film ==
In 1983 Gorky Park was adapted as a film starring William Hurt as Renko.

== See also ==
- Gorky Park, a 1983 film based on the first novel
- Child 44 with Leo Demidov
