= Stalin's Ghost =

2007 crime novel by Martin Cruz Smith

- Author: Martin Cruz Smith
- Language: English
- Series: Arkady Renko # 6
- Genre: Crime novel
- Published: 19 June 2007 Simon & Schuster, Macmillan
- Publication place: United States
- Media type: Print (hardcover)
- Pages: 352 pp (hardback edition)
- ISBN: 0-7432-7672-8
- OCLC: 76940047
- Dewey Decimal: 813/.54 22
- LC Class: PS3569.M5377 S73 2007
- Preceded by: Wolves Eat Dogs
- Followed by: Three Stations

Stalin's Ghost is a crime novel by Martin Cruz Smith set in Russia circa 2005. It is the sixth novel to feature Detective-Investigator Arkady Renko, published 26 years after the initial novel in the Renko series, Gorky Park.

== Summary ==
The ghost of Joseph Stalin has been seen stalking the stations of the Moscow Metro. Renko, perpetually in hot water with his superiors, is assigned to the case with heavy hints to quash it. Instead, he discovers a peculiar connection to a string of murders and a group of Chechen War veterans.

== Plot ==
Arkady Renko is trying to adjust to his new life as a family man with a woman who is not his wife and a boy who is not his son. The prodigal Zhenya is constantly running off on his own for days, sometimes in the company of street children, in the depths of the Moscow winter. Arkady also senses things are starting to sour between him and Dr. Eva Kazka. He and his partner Victor Orlov are investigating claims that someone within the prosecutor's office is committing murder for hire and then covering it up. That is until Prosecutor Zurin calls Arkady off to more unearthly matters: the ghost of Joseph Stalin is being sighted on the Moscow Metro. Knowing all too well that Zurin is giving this case to him as a punishment, Arkady attends to the task of handling it without enthusiasm. Meanwhile, his suspicions begin to be directed towards two fellow detectives: Nikolai Isakov and Marat Urman - both OMON veterans of the Second Chechen War from the town of Tver. Intruding into one of their investigations, he finds evidence that the detectives themselves killed the man in question, and later also his wife while claiming she "swallowed her tongue" in prison. After further incidents on the Metro, Zurin assigns Arkady to conduct an 'unofficial' investigation, his cover being inquiry into supposed death threats directed at Platonov - a paranoid old communist chess grandmaster.

Attending another Stalin sighting, it turns out that the event is being staged to promote a new political party called the Russian Patriots (reminiscent of the Liberal Democratic Party of Russia), whose purpose is to divert opposition votes. After physically disrupting the media spectacle, Renko smiles at the thought of Zurin's reactions to his chief investigator crossing with the political elite. The source of the strain between Arkady and Eva is revealed to be Isakov, whom Eva had known from her time as a medic during the Chechen war. To confound matters, Arkady soon discovers that Isakov is also the primary candidate for the Russian Patriots and will receive judicial immunity as a Russian Senator if elected. Out of both professional and personal concerns, Arkady starts to gather more information on Isakov and Urman. Isakov is known as a war hero, having allegedly fought off much greater Chechen forces without losing a single man. A war reporter named Ginsberg gives Arkady "two truths from the same man": the official story and a far more tawdry rendition - the execution of unsuspecting business partners. Arkady notices that Isakov's fellow platoon members are also turning up dead, and that most of these untimely demises are being investigated by Isakov and Urman themselves. Even Ginsburg is murdered in an apparent face-off with a large snow plow.

Arkady attends a chess tournament with Platonov in hopes of luring Zhenya back. It works, and Zhenya once again portrays his amazing talent for the game. However, during his congratulatory match against Platonov, he suddenly concedes, citing imminent defeat, and flees. Heading outside, Arkady soon learns why: his long-lost father was watching the game. Demanding that he get half the prize money, Zhenya's father ends up shooting Arkady in the head with a defective war pistol. Arkady later learns that the man had enslaved his son in order to use his talents at chess to win money from travelers on the Trans-Siberian Railway. While Renko is recovering from the bullet wound, his overseer Zurin, having already vowed to get rid of him due to an altercation with a hired female killer later found to have connections to the Russian Patriots, is quick to try and shuffle Arkady off as health leave - any city of his choice. He expects Arkady to go down to the sunny coasts of the Black Sea and is amazed at his final choice: Tver. Knowing he is up to something, Zurin reluctantly agrees. Arkady is unsure of what he is after: Eva or Isakov. Either way, he begins to make his way around the town, planning his next move. Encountering Isakov, his American political consultants, and a melancholy Eva, he learns of "the diggers", who unearth Great Patriotic War dead either for profit or sentiment.

Isakov is seeking to utilize this as a propaganda event, his campaign going far better than planned, and so Arkady decides to go himself. Much to Arkady's dismay, Zhenya also makes his way down to Tver, enticed by tales of a legendary sea monster in a nearby lake. With the press flooding in, the main excavation begins. Seeking to make a big show of it, the diggers claim to have triumphantly dug up a mass grave of Russians massacred by the Germans. The circus atmosphere fades, however, when the on-site female Polish pathologist proclaims that the grave is actually Poles killed by the Russians. His name now in disrepute, Isakov's consultants quickly back out. Isakov himself, already uncomfortable with the tone of the campaign, departs. Urman, however, refuses to quit, and he goes out in search of some real Russian victims. Zhenya, having been befriended by Isakov, follows him - causing Arkady to run after them. Arkady and Urman exchange blows, with Arkady managing to gain an early advantage - only for Zhenya, his loyalties torn, to interfere with decidedly unfortunate results. Urman tosses both of them into the pit and begins to bury them alive. His careless shoveling, however, uncovers and detonates a buried land mine, killing Urman.

After leaving the scene and returning Zhenya to his rented residence, Arkady finds Isakov and Eva together. The three begin to walk together and at first behave civilly - each man putting on his best face for Eva's sake. Akrady begins to confront Isakov about his past, showing photographs by Ginsburg which Arkady had managed to recover from an army inspector. Isakov attempts to downplay the allegations, proclaiming his sincere public interests, until it becomes clear that Eva is starting to believe Arkady. Admitting the execution, done to cover up his illicit sales in precious local red dragon carpets, he produces a gun from his coat and is about to kill both of them. Eva removes a tape recorder from her coat, revealing that she had recorded the entire conversation, and tosses the cassette over a nearby fence. Isakov orders Arkady to retrieve the tape, but as he begins to approach the fence a brightly lit snow plow comes rumbling by and foils Isakov's murderous plans. What's more, the cassette lying on the ground is actually a decoy - Eva still possesses the incriminating confession.

Elated by their survival, Eva and Arkady retreat to meet up with Zhenya. Walking through the door, he encounters one of the thugs that accompanied the camera crew promoting the Russian Patriots. Still infuriated by Renko's previous meeting with him, he stabs Eva and prepares to finish off Arkady. Zhenya, meanwhile, trapped on the other side of the room, fumbles to repair an old pistol - a skill he acquired by rebuilding Arkady's gun, but fails to find the final piece. In desperation he fires the weapon anyway - knowing that because of the missing piece he has only one shot. His aim is good, and Arkady is saved. Eva is rushed to hospital, and, like Arkady, manages a near-miraculous survival. He calls Zurin and proclaims the charges against Isakov and describes the taped confession. Finally, he notes that the prosecutor in the town was in league with Isakov and states that this means that a respected impartial prosecutor, namely Zurin himself, must come to look over the case. The novel closes with Renko alone on the hospital roof taking a long, sweeping, pensive look over Lenin Square, the Volga River and the town of Tver as the snow begins to fall once again.
