= Red Square (novel) =

1992 crime novel by Martin Cruz Smith

- First edition
- Author: Martin Cruz Smith
- Language: English
- Series: Arkady Renko # 3
- Genre: Crime novel
- Publisher: Random House
- Publication date: 1992
- Publication place: United States
- Media type: Print
- Pages: 432
- ISBN: 0-00-271276-8
- OCLC: 29403603
- Preceded by: Polar Star
- Followed by: Havana Bay

Red Square is a crime novel by Martin Cruz Smith, primarily set in Moscow, Munich and Berlin between August 6 and August 21, 1991. It is a sequel to Gorky Park and Polar Star and features the Investigator Arkady Renko, taking place during the period of the collapse of the Soviet Union.

== Summary ==
As the existing social and economic structures of the Soviet Union break down, Arkady Renko has been reinstated as an Investigator in the Moscow Militsiya (Police Force). He is trying to clear up a nest of illicit traders when his chief informant dies in a horrific fireball. At the late informer's flat, his fax machine keeps asking the apparently meaningless question, "Where is Red Square?"

The question does not pertain to a location but to an avant-garde painting by suprematist painter Malevich which has resurfaced on the black market after being lost since World War II. The story, however, reverts to the August Coup, which takes place in and around Red Square and indeed throughout Moscow in August 1991, leading to the fragmentation of the former Soviet Union.

One of the subplots within this novel involves Arkady Renko's improbable reunion with the one great love of his life, Irina Asanova. Her seemingly total lack of interest in Arkady sends him resignedly on his way until, in an ultimate ironic twist, a belatedly delivered message from Renko's recently deceased father galvanizes him into one last, determined attempt at winning Irina back.

== Plot ==
Now back in Moscow, Arkady Renko struggles to keep the peace in a town overrun by organized crime and the economic recession caused by the death throes of the Soviet Union. The lawlessness of the new Moscow is brought home to him when one of his informants, a Russian Jewish black marketer named Rudy Rosen, is killed by a firebomb. Suspicion for the act is divided among the leading gangs, including the ever-troublesome Chechens and one led by a new Soviet "entrepreneur".

Whilst looking over Rosen's apartment, Arkady is confused by an incoming fax asking "where is Red Square?", as well as several connections to Germany, specifically Munich. He also is amazed to hear the voice of Irina Asanova, his long-lost love from Gorky Park, announcing for the recently unblocked American propaganda station Radio Liberty, operating out of Munich. Uncovering more and more connections to Germany, and once again facing suppression at home - including the killing of his partner - Arkady manages to coerce the prosecutor to allow him to go to the recently reunified Germany, in an unofficial capacity.

Arkady looks up leads in the Rosen case, as well as trying to reconnect with Irina, but finds she wants nothing to do with him. He soon enters a strained but beneficial relationship with a German police officer called Peter Schiller, who describes his grandfather's escapades as one of Heinrich Himmler's art collectors, particularly of revolutionary avant-garde Russian art, presently persecuted by the Soviet regime. Arkady finds himself a rival in Max Albov, Irina's colleague at Radio Liberty, whom he previously encountered in Moscow and is now starting to suspect of involvement with Rosen. Irina repents of her dislike for Arkady after learning that he has not been living as the spoiled apparatchik she thought he was, and awkwardly all three of them head for Berlin. At an art exhibition, the avant-garde piece by Malevich called "Red Square" is proudly shown to audiences. Increasingly finding his present company intertwined with the case, Arkady realizes that he has stumbled across a vast and deadly art-smuggling operation.

In an effort to silence him, Arkady is framed in the death of the Chechen leader Makhmud and has to dodge the inevitable reprisal. Arranging to get the painting, Arkady and Irina return to Moscow, well aware of the staged coup of Communist Party hardliners. He arranges a swap, knowing that it is a trap. After escaping a firefight in rural Moscow where the stash of paintings are kept, he and Max settle into the confusion of the coup and protests. Arkady finds himself cornered, but is saved by Chechen gang members who have learned the real cause of their leader's death. Together again, he and Irina stand with the other protesters and press as tanks march towards Russia's new impromptu parliament, the White House.

== Gallery ==
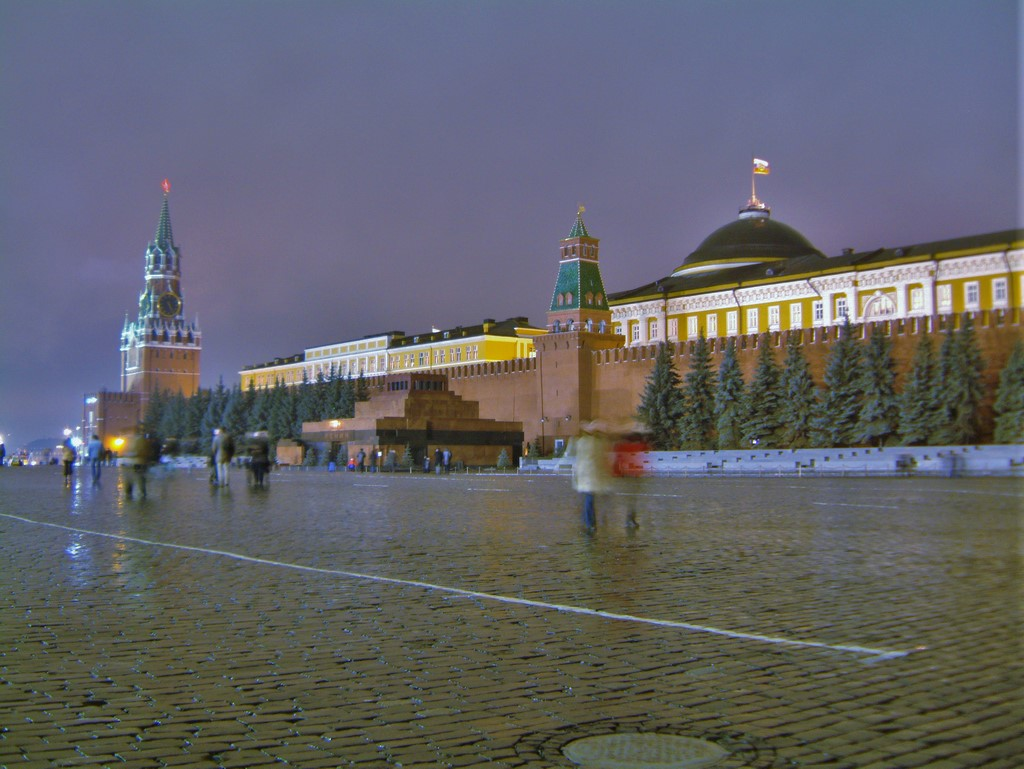
The Red Square in Moscow

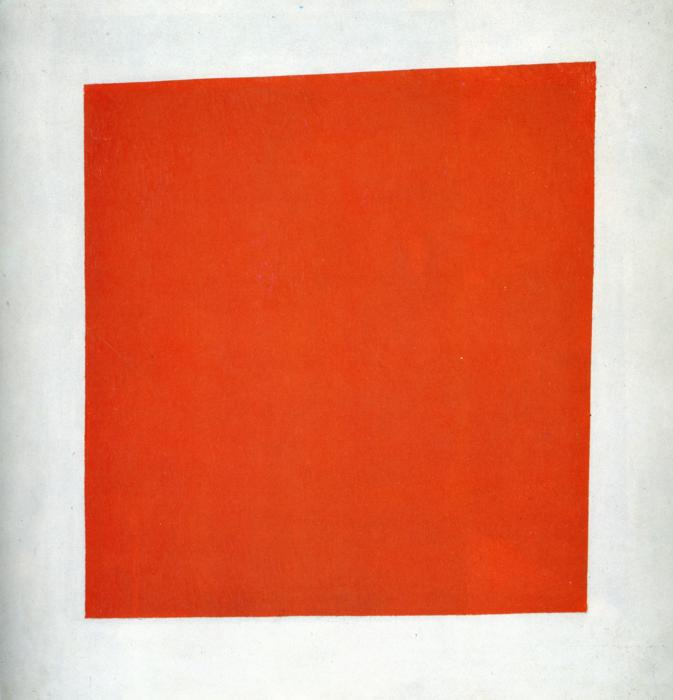
Rotes Viereck (Red Square, Malevich, 1915), the source of the book's name.
