= Robert Vaughan (author) =

American writer

- Born: Robert Richard Vaughan Jr. November 22, 1937
- Died: March 16, 2024 (aged 86)
- Other names: J.D. Bodine; James Calder Boone; G.A. Carrington; Ernie Chapel; Dale Colter; Paula Fairman; Jack Gregory; William Grant; Paul King; T.J. Jack; B.J. Lanagan; Jake Logan; Sara Luck; Patricia Matthews; K.C. McKenna; Hank Mitchum; Lee Morgan; Paula Moore; Robert Todaro; Dave Vance; Lee Davis Willoughby
- Occupation: Author

Robert Vaughan (born Robert Richard Vaughan Jr.; 22 November 1937 – March 2024) was an American writer. He has authored over 400 books in nearly every genre. He won the 1977 Porgie Award (Best Paperback Original) for The Power and the Pride. He has also written a series of contemporary and historical romance novels under several pseudonyms including "Paula Moore" and "Paula Fairman". He wrote the novelization for the television movie Andersonville.

Vaughan was a frequent speaker at seminars and at high schools and colleges, and has also hosted three television talk shows: Eyewitness Magazine on WAVY-TV in Portsmouth, Virginia; Tidewater A.M. on W05BQ-TV in Hampton, Virginia; and This Week in Books on the TEMPO Cable Television Network. He has also written and produced a one-man play about Ernest Hemingway.

Vaughan was a retired Army Warrant Officer (CW-3) with three tours in Vietnam where he was awarded the Distinguished Flying Cross, the Air Medal with the V for valor, the Bronze Star, the Meritorious Service Medal, and the Purple Heart. He was a helicopter pilot and a maintenance and supply officer. He was also an instructor and Chief of the Aviation Maintenance Officers' Course at Fort Eustis, Virginia.

Vaughan was inducted into the Writers' Hall of Fame in 1998.

== Partial bibliography ==
- Girls of Carnation House (1964)
- Lust Empire (1965)
- Sororities of Sin (1969) as Dave Vance
- Mistress of the Lash (1970)
- Brandywine's War (1971)
- Slave's Blood (1972)
- The Valkyrie Mandate (1973)
- Las Vegas (1974)
- Heart of Nashville (1975)
- Nashville (1975)
- The Power And The Pride (1976)
- Savage Rapture (1978) as Paula Moore
- The Sin (1979)
- Love's Bold Journey (1980) as Patricia Matthews
- Love's Sweet Agony (1980) as Patricia Matthews
- The Love Pirate (1980) as Paula Moore
- Southern Rose (1980) as Paula Fairman
- The Tender and the Savage (1980) as Paula Fairman
- The Perfect Couple (1981) as Paula Moore
- Divine Wind (1983)
- River of Passion (1983) as Paula Fairman
- Savages (1983)
- A Distant Bugle (1984)
- The Quick and the Dead (1984)
- Texas Proud (1987)
- Transgressions (1988)
- Survival: A Novel of the Donner Party (1994) as K.C. McKenna
- Legacy (1995)
- Andersonville (1996)
- Texas Glory (1996)
- Yesterday's Reveille (1996)
- Blood on the Plains (1997)
- Range Wars (1997)
- Adobe Walls (1998)
- In Honored Glory (1999)
- Touch the Face of God (2002)
- Christmas Past (2003)
- Trailback (2003)
- The Lawmen (2003)
- Whose Voice the Waters Heard (2003)
- His Truth Is Marching On (2004)
- Brandywine's War: Back In Country (2004)
- Light of Hope (2004)
- When Hell Came to Texas (2013)
- The Other Side of Memory (2014)
- The Battle of Badwater (2015)
- Thunder in the Whirlwind (2016)

American Chronicles

- Dawn of the Century (1992)
- Over There (1992)
- The Lost Generation (1992)
- Hard Times (1993)
- Portals of Hell (1993)
- The Iron Curtain (1994)
- Cold War (1995)
- The New Frontier (1995)
- Flower Children (1996)

Arrow and Saber

- Oushata Massacre (1989) as G.A. Carrington
- Cavanaugh's Island (1989) as G.A. Carrington
- The Comanche War (1990) as G.A. Carrington
- Templeton Massacre (1990) as G.A. Carrington

Bushwhackers

- Bushwhackers (1997) as B.J. Lanagan
- Rebel County (1997) as B.J. Lanagan
- The Killing Edge (1997) as B.J. Lanagan
- The Dying Town (1998) as B.J. Lanagan
- Mexican Standoff (1998) as B.J. Lanagan
- Epitaph (1998) as B.J. Lanagan
- A Time for Killing (1999) as B.J. Lanagan
- Death Pass (1999) as B.J. Lanagan
- Hangman's Drop (2000) as B.J. Lanagan

Cade McCall

- Long Road To Abilene (2016)
- Cade's Revenge (2016)
- Cade's Redemption (2017)
- Cade at the Walls (2017)
- Cade McCall: Army Scout (2019)

Chaney Brothers Western

- Glory Dust (1991) as T.J. Jack
- The Chaney Edge (1992) as T.J. Jack

Crocketts

- Trail of Vengeance (2021)
- Slaughter In Texas (2021)
- Law Of The Rope (2021)
- The Town That Wouldn't Die (2021)
- Panhandle Justice (2021)
- Showdown At Red Rock (2021)
- Judgement Day (2021)
- A Time To Die (2021)
- Escape From the Devil (2021)
- Justice Of The Gun (2021)
- The Guns of Prescott (2021)
- The Lost Heard (2022)

Dateline

- Phu Loi (1987) as Ernie Chapel
- An Loi (1988) as Ernie Chapel

The Dreamers

- The Discoverers (1994) as Paul King

Faraday

- The Gold Train (1988) as William Grant
- Train of Glory (1989) as William Grant
- The Trackwalker (1989) as William Grant
- The Buffalo Train (2021)

Hawke

- Ride With the Devil (2004)
- Showdown at Dead End Canyon (2005)
- Vendetta Trail (2005)
- The Law of a Fast Gun (2006)
- The King Hill War (2007)

Law & Order

- In Deep (1993) as Jack Gregory
- Black Out (1993) as Jack Gregory
- Dead End (1994) as Jack Gregory

Lucas Cain

- A Rambling Man (2023)
- A Heap of Killing (2023)
- Ghost Coach (2023)
- Cain's Justice (2024)

Making of America

- Hearts Divided (1979) as Paula Moore
- The Ranchers (1980) as Lee Davis Willoughby
- The Raiders (1984) as Lee Davis Willoughby
- Warriors of the Code (1985) as Lee Davis Willoughby

McMasters

- Plunder Valley (1995) as Lee Morgan

People of the Book

- The Masada Scroll (2007) Co-Written with Paul Block
- Armor of God(2008) Co-Written with Paul Block

Quinn Raiders

- Blood Money (1988) as J.D. Bodine
- Diablo Double Cross (1988) as J.D. Bodine

Ralph Compton

- Demon's Pass (2000) (The Sundown Riders Series)
- Clarion's Call (2001)
- The Dakota Trail (2001) (The Trail Drive Series)
- The Alamosa Trail (2002) (The Trail Drive Series)
- Runaway Stage (2002) (The Sundown Riders Series)
- The Bozeman Trail (2003) (The Trail Drive Series)

The Regulator

- The Regulator (1990) as Dale Colter
- Gravedancer (1991) as Dale Colter
- The Scalp Hunters (1992) as Dale Colter

Remington

- Red River Revenge (1987) as James Calder Boone
- Good Day for a Hangin' (1987) as James Calder Boone
- Showdown at Comanche Butte (1987) as James Calder Boone
- Lawman's Justice (1987) as James Calder Boone

Slack Team

- Silent Coup (2017)
- Target Earth (2018)

Slocum

- Cheyenne Bloodbath (1986) as Jake Logan

Stagecoach

- Casper (1988) as Hank Mitchum
- Fort Verde (1988) as Hank Mitchum
- Silverado (1989) as Hank Mitchum
- Buffalo Station (1990) as Hank Mitchum

War Torn

- The Brave and the Lonely (1982)
- The Embattled and the Bold (1983)
- The Fallen and the Free (1983)
- The Divine and the Damned (1983)
- The Masters and the Martyrs (1983)

When Honor Dies

- When Honor Dies (1991) as Robert Todaro
- Blood Oath (1992) as Robert Todaro
- The Broken Covenant (1992) as Robert Todaro

Wild Wild West

- The Wild, Wild West (1998)
- The Night of the Death Train (1998)
- The Night of the Assassin (1998)

Women Who Won the West

- Lost Lady of Laramie (1982) as Lee Davis Willoughby
