= The Girl from Venice =

2016 novel by Martin Cruz Smith

- 1st ed, HC
- Author: Martin Cruz Smith
- Cover artist: Rex Bonomelli
- Language: English
- Publisher: Simon & Schuster
- Publication date: 17 October 2016
- Publication place: United States
- Media type: Print (Hardcover, Paperback)
- Pages: 320 (hardback)
- ISBN: 978-1-439-14023-9

The Girl from Venice is a 2016 historical fiction novel by American author Martin Cruz Smith. The novel details the encounter and subsequent relationship between Innocenzo (Cenzo) Vianello, a fisherman from Pellestrina, and Giulia Silber, daughter of a wealthy Jewish family from Venice, and is set in early 1945.

== Plot ==
The novel takes place during the weeks before the collapse of the Republic of Salò and the death of Benito Mussolini. While fishing at night, Cenzo rescues from the water Giulia, who was fleeing from the Wehrmacht. Giulia had been hiding with her family in a hospital, but their location and identity were betrayed, and she swims the Venetian Lagoon to escape. Cenzo's pastoral life soon becomes quite complicated as he tries to help her leave Italy.

== Reception ==
Critics were generally positive. Dennis Drabelle, reviewing for The Washington Post, called it an "engaging new novel". Bethanne Patrick, for NPR, felt the plot was simple, but the novel was well written, stating that "everything is predictable, and yet nothing is stale" and "it will also serve as a tonic to those who are weary of terribly complex plots requiring flow charts and genealogies". However, Charles Finch, writing for The New York Times, called it "very, very bad" and full of Hemingway-like clichés about war: "every gesture of midcentury Romanticism in 'The Girl From Venice' is a received one, repackaged and presented as the most profound wisdom".
