= Wolves Eat Dogs =

2004 book by Martin Cruz Smith

- First edition
- Author: Martin Cruz Smith
- Language: English
- Series: Arkady Renko #5
- Genre: Crime novel
- Published: 2004
- Publisher: Simon & Schuster, Macmillan
- Publication place: United States
- Media type: Print (Hardcover, Paperback)
- Pages: 352pp (hardback edition)
- ISBN: 0-684-87254-4
- OCLC: 55981782
- Dewey Decimal: 813/.54 22
- LC Class: PS3569.M5377 W65 2004
- Preceded by: Havana Bay
- Followed by: Stalin's Ghost

Wolves Eat Dogs is a crime novel by Martin Cruz Smith, set in Russia and Ukraine in the year 2004. It is the fifth novel to feature Investigator Arkady Renko and the first one taking place in Russia during the new, independent (post-Soviet) era.

== Plot ==
Russia has changed from a Communist to capitalist state, and Ukraine has seceded from the former Soviet Union. When Pavel "Pasha" Ivanov, one of the leading members of Russia's new billionaire class, dies in an apparent suicide, Renko investigates. Pasha fell from the balcony of his penthouse apartment, and all the signs point to his having been alone at the time. The only anomaly is a large mound of table salt in the victim's wardrobe.

Despite interference from his own boss as well as from other persons of power, Renko continues his investigation by questioning Pasha's friends and associates. There is apparently some kind of dark secret in Ivanov's past, and Pasha was always very depressed around May Day. Just before he is forcefully removed from the investigation, Arkady returns alone to Pasha's apartment and reconstructs his movements on the night he died. In the drawer of his bureau, Arkady finds a radiation dosimeter wrapped in a blood-stained handkerchief. Turning it on, he finds that the entire apartment is radioactive, the highest levels coming from the mound of salt. Arkady concludes that Ivanov did indeed commit suicide but that it was under a form of duress. A HazMat team re-examines the apartment and Pasha's body and finds that the salt was mixed with a small quantity of cesium chloride, identical in appearance to table salt but lethally radioactive. After confirming that his apartment was filled with radiation, Ivanov swallowed a large quantity of the salt before jumping, in an attempt to protect anyone entering the apartment later.

A week after Arkady's discovery, Pasha's business partner Timofeyev is found murdered near Pripyat, Ukraine, in the "dead zone" around the site of the Chernobyl disaster. Arkady's superior, exasperated at his insubordination, posts him to Ukraine to "investigate" this murder with neither assistance nor resources. He makes the acquaintance of the colorful local community: a team of radiobiologists, various foreign scientists, and a small group of peasant squatters who refuse to leave the area despite the official evacuation. Arkady also becomes the lover of Eva Kazka, a medical doctor assigned to the scientific community. Eva confides to him that she was rendered infertile and also suffered a long series of operable cancers as a result of exposure to radioactive fallout that blanketed Kyiv while she was marching in a May Day parade after the accident.

Eva's ex-husband, Alex Gerasimov, the leader of the radiobiology team, kidnaps Arkady and reveals himself to be the culprit, explaining his motives with relish: Ivanov and Timofeyev were the favorite pupils of Alex's father, Felix Gerasimov, the Soviet Union's leading authority on nuclear accidents. When the Central Committee telephoned Gerasimov to ask what to do about the accident, Gerasimov was too drunk to respond, so Ivanov and Timofeyev took the call, pretending to be relaying Gerasimov's instructions. Based on what the Committee told them, Ivanov and Timofeyev decided that it was unnecessary to either evacuate Pripyat or to cancel the May Day celebrations in Kyiv. In other words, Ivanov and Timofeyev were ambitious men who reacted to a crisis the way ambitious men do: by covering up for their boss, and by telling the men in charge what they want to hear - and by doing so, they allowed millions of civilians (including Eva) to be exposed to the fallout. Gerasimov remained untouched by the scandal but later committed suicide.

While Alex admits that Ivanov and Timofeyev were not solely responsible for the disaster, he felt they should be held accountable to some degree. He planted tiny grains of cesium on their clothes and persons, tormenting them before administering fatal doses. He even offered to stop if Ivanov and Timofeyev would return to Chernobyl and admit their responsibility, but "they were too ashamed to save their own lives." After Ivanov's death, Timofeyev tried to save himself by returning to the scene of his crime, though Alex says he doesn't know who murdered him. Having killed his assistants in cold blood, Alex prepares to kill Arkady to cover his tracks when he is shot down by the vengeful sister of one of the assistants.

Arkady reports that Pasha's case has been solved, though the murders of Timofeyev and Alex Gerasimov remain open. He is recalled to Moscow. Eva leaves with him, and the couple adopt an orphaned boy named Zhenya whom Arkady has been mentoring at a local shelter.

A few months later, they make a one-day trip back to Pripyat to visit some of their local friends, an elderly farmer couple who have lived in the same place all their lives, and whose grandchildren died from radiation poisoning. Seeing the husband, Roman, slaughter a pig in almost exactly the same way as Timofeyev was killed, Arkady and Eva realize that it was Roman who killed Timofeyev, and why, but refrain from reporting it to the authorities.

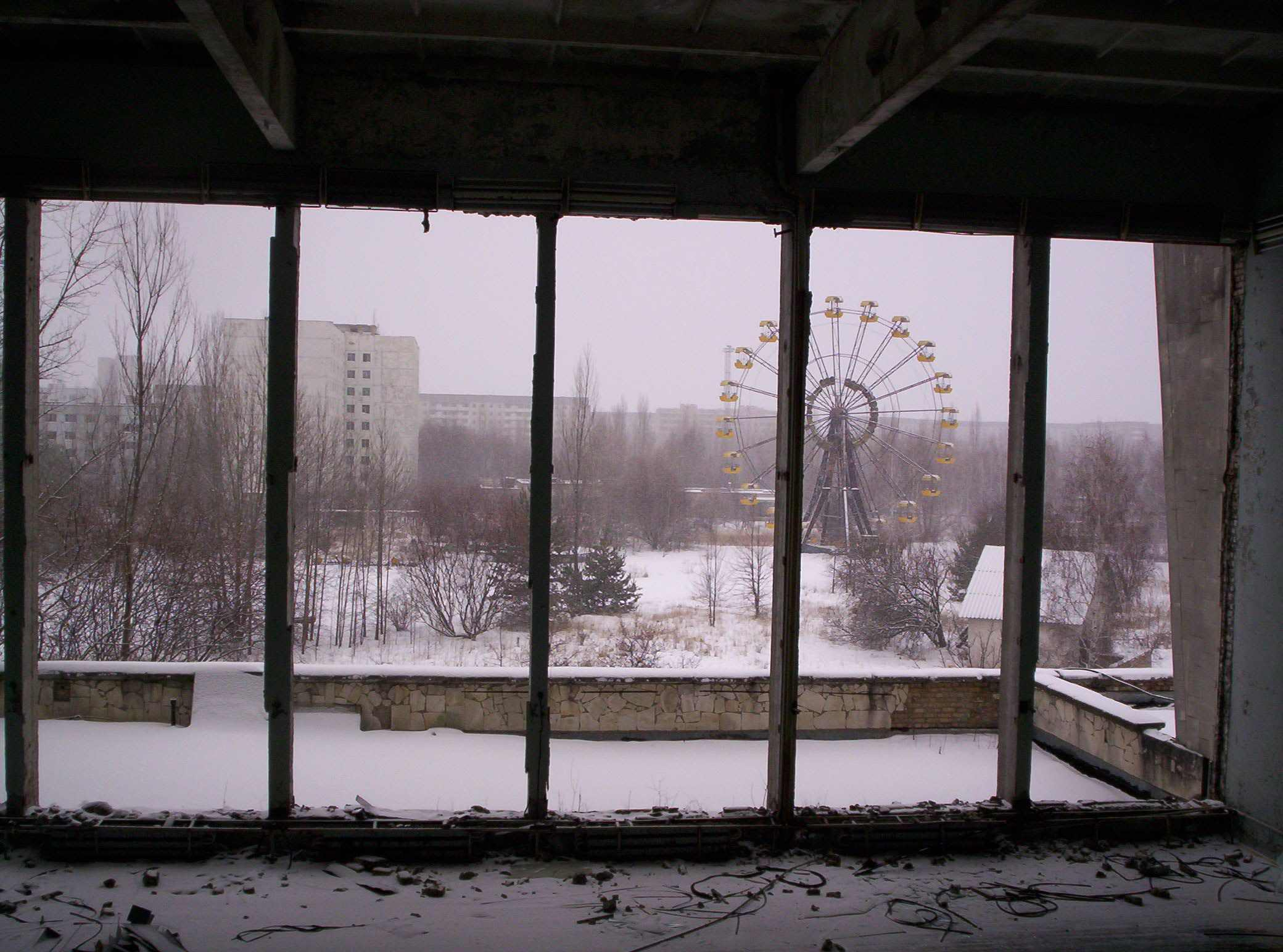
View from building with Pripyat amusement park Ferris wheel visible

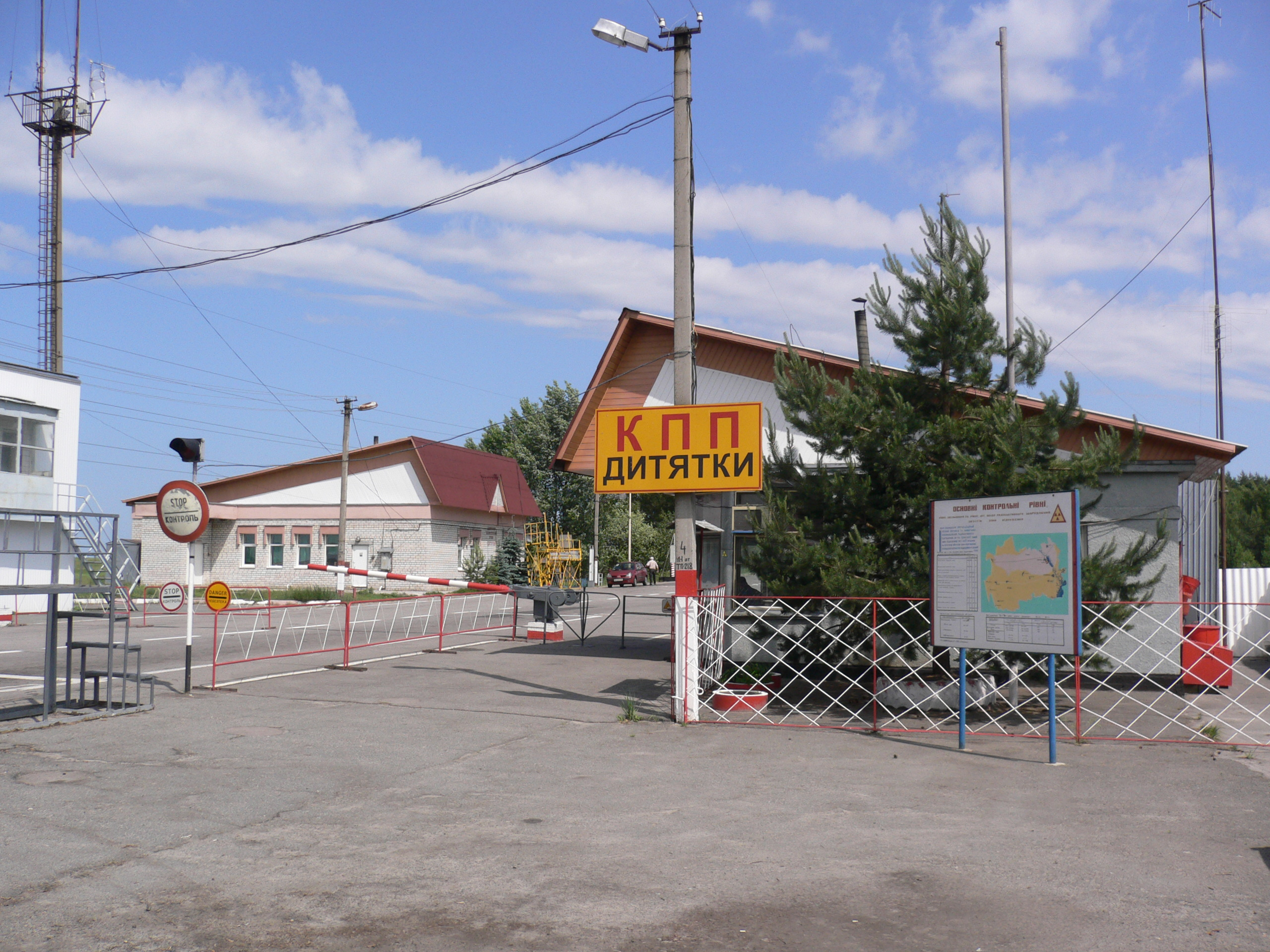
Entrance to the Chernobyl Exclusion Zone at Checkpoint "Dityatki"
