= Martin Cruz Smith =

American writer (1942–2025)

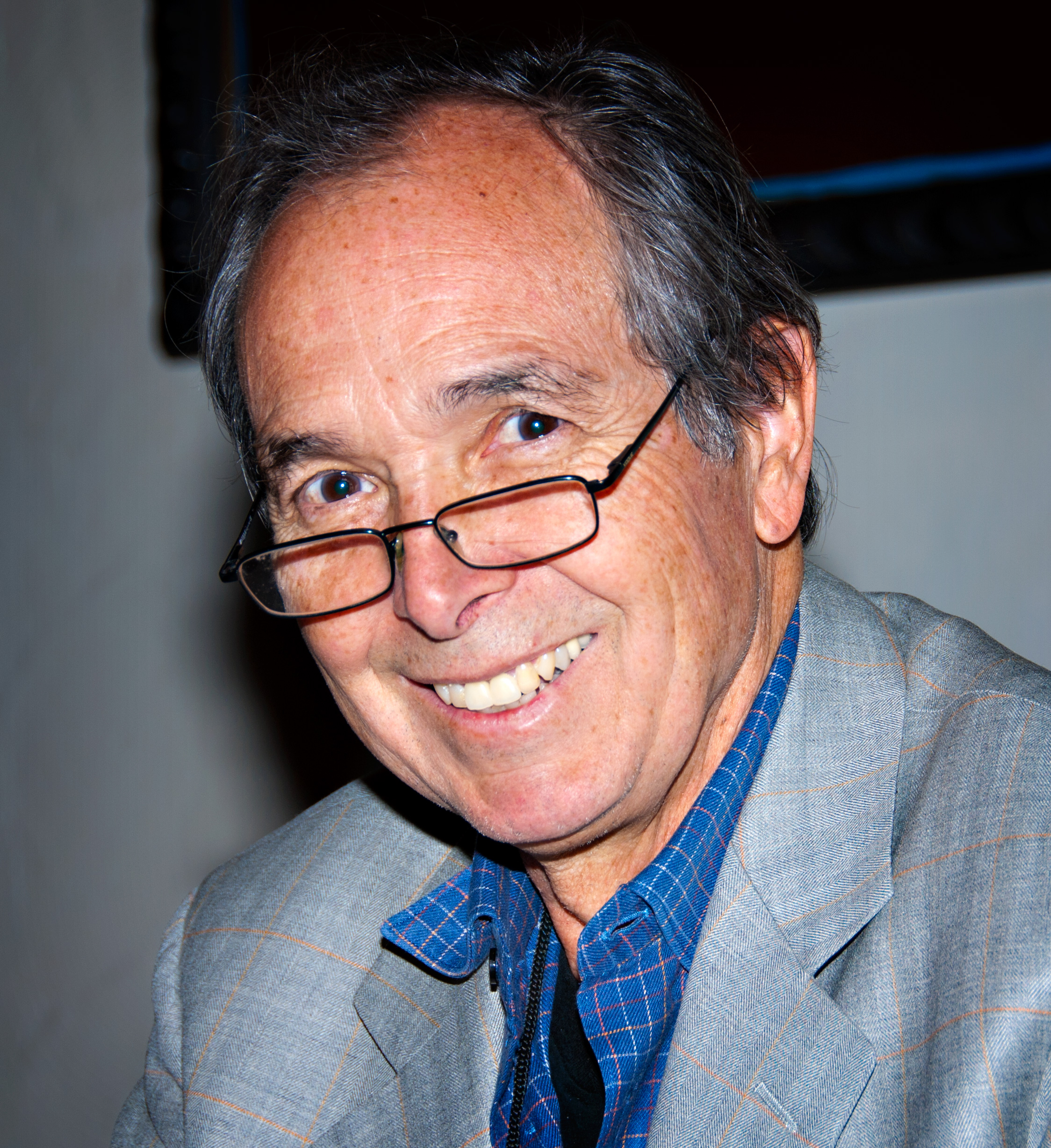
- Smith in 2011
- Born: Martin William Smith; November 3, 1942; Reading, Pennsylvania, U.S.
- Died: July 11, 2025 (aged 82); San Rafael, California, U.S.
- Education: University of Pennsylvania (BA)
- Occupations: Novelist; screenwriter
- Writing career
- Pen name: see list here
- Period: 1970–2025
- Genres: Mystery; Crime
- Notable work: Gorky Park
- Notable awards: Hammett Prize; Gold Dagger
- Website: martincruzsmith.com

Martin William Smith (November 3, 1942 – July 11, 2025), known professionally as Martin Cruz Smith, was an American writer of mystery and suspense fiction, mostly in an international or historical setting. He was best known for his 11-book series featuring Russian investigator Arkady Renko, who was introduced in 1981 with Gorky Park and last appeared in Hotel Ukraine (2025).

== Early life and education ==
Martin William Smith was born in Reading, Pennsylvania, to John Calhoun Smith, a jazz musician, and Louise Lopez, an American Indian of Pueblo descent, jazz singer, teacher, Amerindian rights militant, and Miss New Mexico 1939. Smith was educated at Germantown Academy and at the University of Pennsylvania in Philadelphia. He received a Bachelor of Arts degree in creative writing in 1964. He was of partly Pueblo, Spanish, Senecú del Sur and Yaqui ancestry.

== Career ==
Smith worked as a journalist from 1965 to 1969 and began writing fiction in the early 1970s. He wrote two novels in the Slocum adult action Western novels, published under the house name Jake Logan. Smith also wrote three novels in the Nick Carter series, published under the Nick Carter name.

Smith's paperback originals included a series about a character named "The Inquisitor", a James Bond-type agent employed by the Vatican; and a science fiction novel, The Indians Won (1970), one of the earliest works of Native American speculative fiction to see wide publication.

Canto for a Gypsy, Smith's third novel overall and the second to feature Roman Grey, a gypsy art dealer in New York City, was nominated for an Edgar Award. Nightwing (1977), also an Edgar nominee, was his breakthrough novel, and he adapted it for a feature film of the same name (1979).

Smith was best known for his novels featuring Russian investigator Arkady Renko, who was introduced in Gorky Park (1981). The novel, which Time called the "first thriller of the '80s", became a bestseller and won a Gold Dagger from the British Crime Writers' Association. Renko later appeared in ten other novels by Smith. Gorky Park debuted at No. 2 on the New York Times bestseller list on April 26, 1981, and occupied the top spot for a week. It stayed in the No. 2 position for over three months, beaten only by James Clavell's Noble House, and stayed in the top 15 through November of that year. Polar Star also claimed the No. 1 spot for two weeks on August 6, 1989, and held the No. 2 spot for over two months.

During the 1990s, Smith twice won the Dashiell Hammett Award from the North American Branch of the International Association of Crime Writers. The first time was for Rose in 1996; the second time was for Havana Bay in 1999. On September 5, 2010, he and Arkady Renko returned to the New York Times bestseller list when Three Stations debuted at No. 7 on the fiction bestsellers list. His final novel, Hotel Ukraine, debuted just 3 days before his death.

=== Pseudonyms ===
Smith originally wrote under the name "Martin Smith", only to discover there were other writers with the same name. His agent asked him to add a third name and he chose Cruz, his paternal grandmother's surname.

His other pen names were Ted Irish, Dr. Emile Korngold, Sol Roman, Nick Carter, Jake Logan, Martin Quinn, Simon Quinn and Martin Smith.

== Personal life and death ==
Smith was diagnosed with Parkinson's disease in 1995, but kept it a secret from the public, saying in 2013 that he wanted to be judged for his writing rather than his disease. He died of the disease at a senior living community in San Rafael, California, on July 11, 2025, at the age of 82.

== Published works ==
=== Romano Grey books ===
(as Martin Smith)

- Gypsy in Amber. New York: Putnam, [1971] ISBN 0-399-10386-4
- Canto for a Gypsy. New York: Putnam, [1972] ISBN 978-0-399-11024-5

=== Written under the pseudonym Simon Quinn ===
==== The Inquisitor Series ====
1. The Devil in Kansas (1974)
2. The Last Time I Saw Hell (1974)
3. Nuplex Red (1974)
4. His Eminence, Death (1974)
5. The Midas Coffin (1975)
6. Last Rites for the Vulture (1975)

==== Others ====
- The Human Factor (1975)

=== Written under the pseudonym Martin Quinn ===
- The Wilderness Family (1975)

=== Written under the pseudonym Nick Carter ===
- Inca Death Squad (1972)
- The Devil's Dozen (1973)
- Code Name: Werewolf (1973)

=== Written under the pseudonym Jake Logan ===
- North to Dakota (a Slocum western) (1976)
- Ride for Revenge (a Slocum western) (1977)

=== Arkady Renko books ===
- Gorky Park. New York: Random House. 1981 ISBN 978-0-394-51748-3
- Polar Star. New York: Random House. 1989 ISBN 978-0-394-57819-4
- Red Square. New York: Random House. 1992 ISBN 978-0-679-41688-3
- Havana Bay. New York: Random House. 1999 ISBN 978-0-679-42662-2
- Wolves Eat Dogs. New York: Simon & Schuster. 2004 ISBN 978-0-684-87254-4
- Stalin's Ghost. New York: Simon & Schuster. 2007 ISBN 978-0-7432-7672-6
- Three Stations. New York: Simon & Schuster. 2010 ISBN 978-0-7432-7674-0
- Tatiana. New York: Simon & Schuster. 2013 ISBN 978-1-8498-3810-8
- The Siberian Dilemma. New York: Simon & Schuster. 2019 ISBN 978-1-4391-4025-3
- Independence Square. New York: Simon & Schuster. 2023 ISBN 978-1-64313-325-6
- Hotel Ukraine. New York: Simon & Schuster. 2025 ISBN 978-1-9821-8838-2

=== Other books ===
- The Indians Won (1970)
- The Analog Bullet (1972)
- Nightwing (1977)
- Stallion Gate (1986), ISBN 0-345-31079-9
- Rose (1996)
- December 6 (2002) (also published as Tokyo Station)
- The Girl from Venice (2016)
