= Hotel Ukraine (novel) =

2025 book

- Author: Martin Cruz Smith
- Language: English
- Series: Arkady Renko #11
- Genre: Crime novel
- Publisher: Simon & Schuster
- Publication date: July 8, 2025
- Publication place: United States
- Pages: 288 pp
- ISBN: 9781982188382
- Preceded by: Independence Square

Hotel Ukraine is a 2025 crime fiction novel by American author Martin Cruz Smith. It is the eleventh and last of Smith's works to feature fictional detective Arkady Renko, published days before the author's death. Renko, suffering from the effects of Parkinson's disease, is tasked to investigate the murder of a defense minister at the Hotel Ukraine in Moscow. His investigation leads him to Ukraine, where he and journalist-girlfriend Tatiana Petrovna seek to expose atrocities that occurred in the city of Bucha as part of the Russian invasion of Ukraine.
