= The Siberian Dilemma =

Crime novel

- Author: Martin Cruz Smith
- Language: English
- Series: Arkady Renko #9
- Genre: Crime novel
- Publisher: Simon & Schuster
- Publication date: 2019
- Publication place: United States
- Pages: 368 pp
- ISBN: 9781849838207
- Preceded by: Tatiana
- Followed by: Independence Square

The Siberian Dilemma is a 2019 crime fiction novel by American writer Martin Cruz Smith. The novel's main character is Arkady Renko, who appears in a number of Smith's works. It is the ninth of Smith's works to feature Renko. Renko is sent to Siberian taiga to investigate "oil oligarchs". Critical reception of the book included disappointment that it lacked "the exciting twists and turns of Smith's earlier novels".

A "Siberian dilemma" itself has been described as a no-win situation: if an ice fisher falls into a break in the ice, they may remain in the water and die of hypothermia in water or move back above the water and die by exposure to low temperatures above the ice.
