= Nightwing (novel) =

1977 novel by Martin Cruz Smith

- First edition cover
- Author: Martin Cruz Smith
- Genre: Thriller
- Publisher: W. W. Norton
- Publication date: September 26, 1977

Nightwing is a 1977 thriller novel by American author Martin Cruz Smith, who adapted it for a 1979 film with the same title directed by Arthur Hiller.

== Plot summary ==
A disgruntled, disenfranchised Hopi shaman sets out to "end the world" by way of a ritual invocation of the Hopi god of death. Shortly after his mutilated corpse is discovered by a skeptical Tewa deputy the body count begins to rise as more strangely slashed and bloodied victims are found.
