= Havana Bay (novel) =

1999 crime novel by Martin Cruz Smith

- First edition
- Author: Martin Cruz Smith
- Language: English
- Series: Arkady Renko # 4
- Genre: Crime novel
- Publisher: Random House
- Publication date: 1999
- Publication place: United States
- Media type: Print (Hardcover, Paperback)
- Pages: 329
- ISBN: 0-679-42662-0
- OCLC: 41351794
- Preceded by: Red Square
- Followed by: Wolves Eat Dogs

Havana Bay is a crime novel by Martin Cruz Smith, set in Cuba. It is the fourth novel to feature Investigator Arkady Renko, and it won the 1999 Hammett Prize. Cruz Smith has stated the book allowed him to explore America's "insane" relationship with Cuba and that it led to some criticism of him in the U.S.

== Plot ==
Renko is depressed because his beloved wife Irina is dead due to a misunderstanding through carelessness on the part of a Russian doctor and his nurse. He is in a suicidal state of mind when anonymously summoned to Havana to help an old acquaintance out of some unspecified trouble. By the time he arrives, however, the good Colonel Pribluda, late of the SVR, has apparently died under very mysterious circumstances.

The novel begins with Arkady at the tip of Havana Bay as the sun begins to rise on what promises to be a hot day in Cuba. The Cuban militia has what they believe is a dead Russian. Renko being a Senior Investigator from Moscow who knew Pribluda, the Cubans are hoping he can expedite matters by both confirming the liquefying corpse's identity and affirming it as a natural or accidental death.

In a decaying Cuba filled with cars and houses that were built in the 1950s and are now falling to pieces, Renko stumbles upon a plot to defraud Russia of $250 million in an underhanded sugar purchase scam. Along the way, there are the gruesome killings, abakua ceremonies and attacks upon his person.

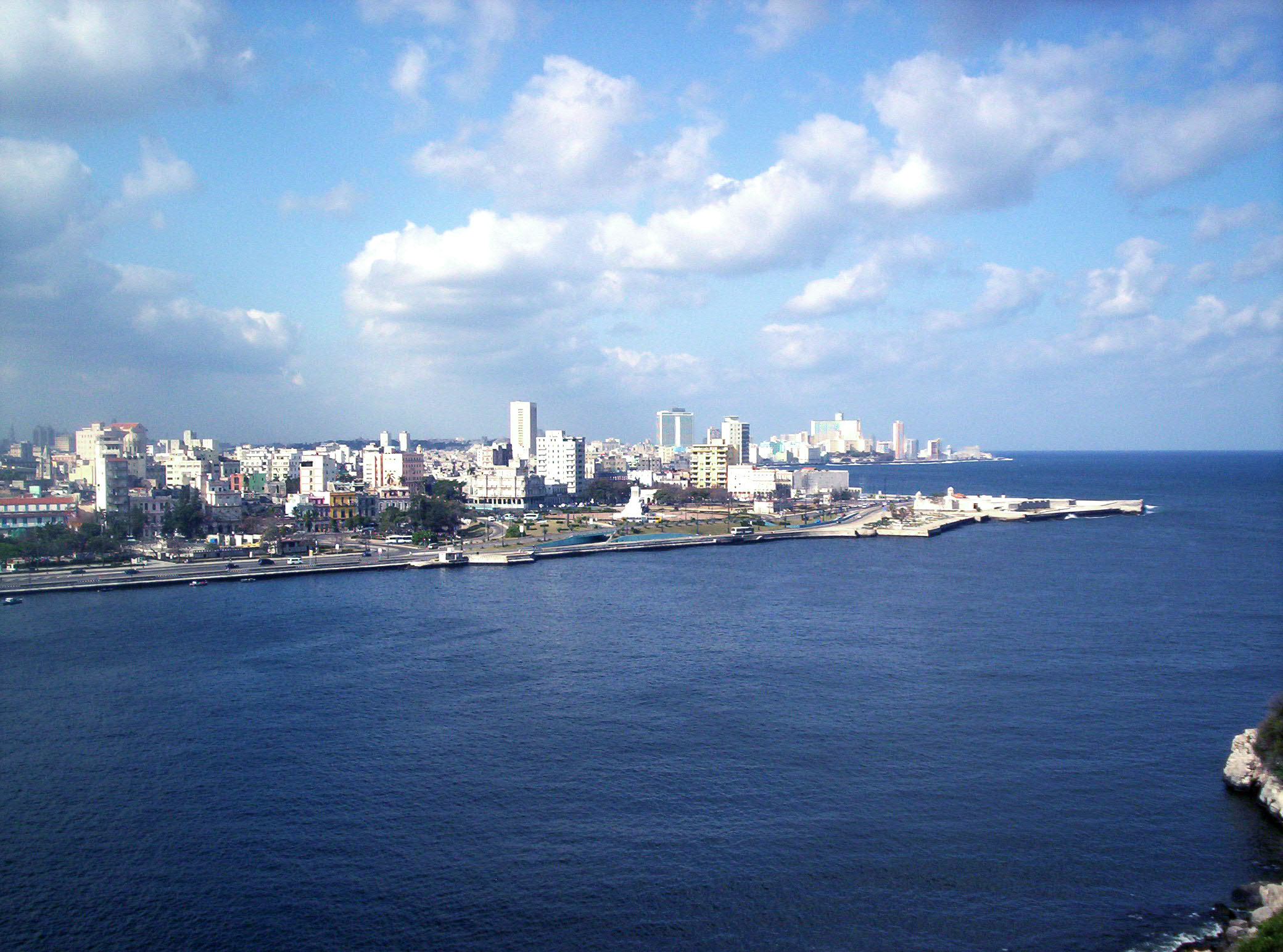
Havana Bay entrance

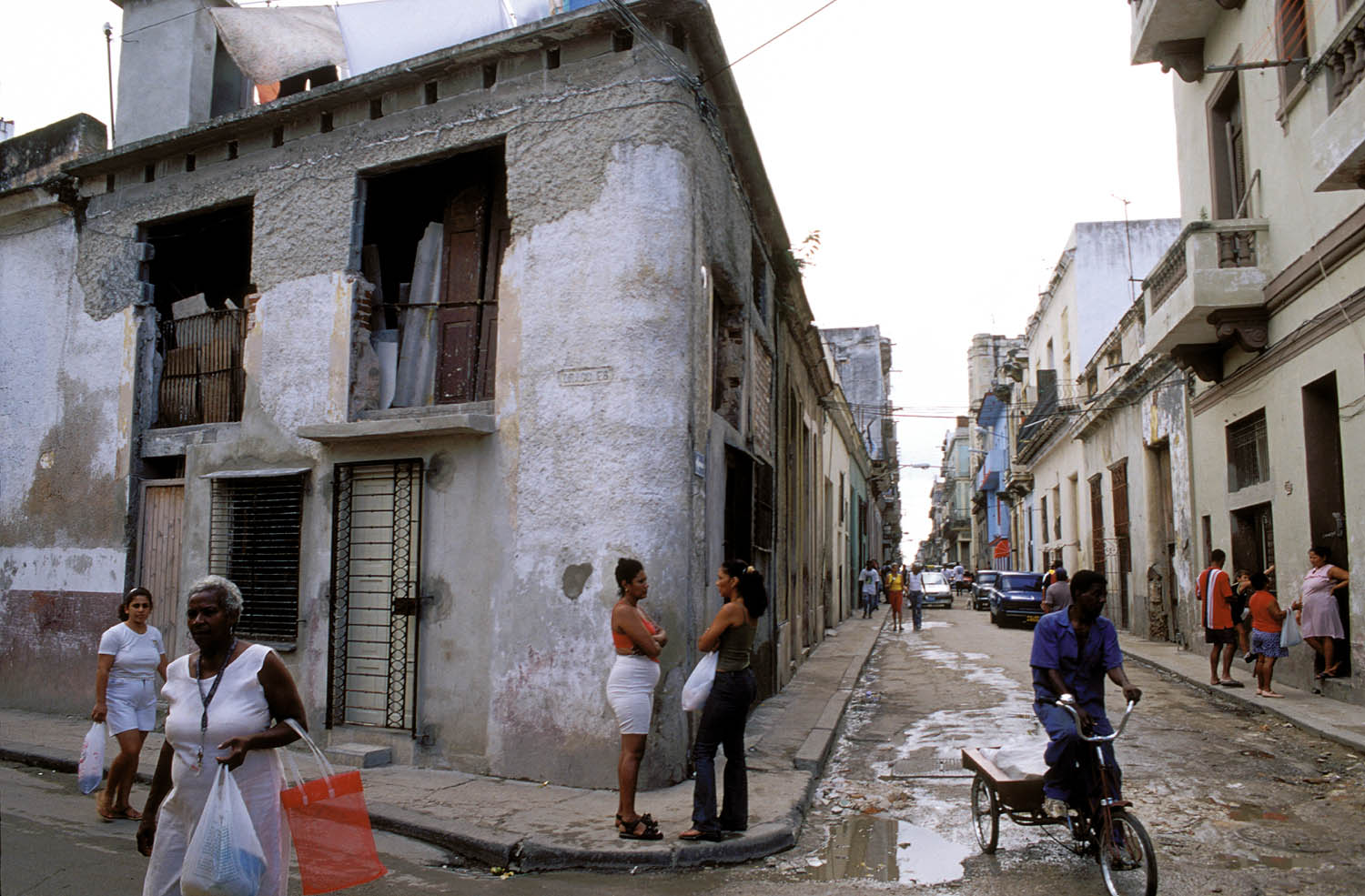
Street scene at the Old Havana in 2002
