= Nightwing (film) =

1979 film by Arthur Hiller

- Theatrical release poster
- Directed by: Arthur Hiller
- Written by: Martin Cruz Smith; Steve Shagan; Bud Shrake
- Based on: Nightwing by Martin Cruz Smith
- Produced by: Martin Ransohoff
- Starring: Nick Mancuso; David Warner; Kathryn Harrold; Stephen Macht; Strother Martin
- Cinematography: Charles Rosher Jr.
- Edited by: John C. Howard
- Music by: Henry Mancini
- Distributed by: Columbia Pictures
- Release date: June 22, 1979
- Running time: 105 minutes
- Country: United States
- Language: English
- Budget: $5.5 million

Nightwing is a 1979 American horror film directed by the Canadian filmmaker Arthur Hiller. The screenplay was written by Martin Cruz Smith, Steve Shagan and Bud Shrake, based on the 1977 novel of the same title by Smith. The movie's tagline is "Day belongs to man, but night is theirs!" It was one of many imitators of the 1975 film Jaws.

== Plot ==
Youngman Duran, a deputy on a Hopi Indian reservation in New Mexico, investigates a series of mysterious cattle mutilations. Abner Tasupi, an ancient and embittered medicine man who raised Youngman after his parents died, reveals that he has woven a spell to end the world that very night. However, Youngman assumes Tasupi is simply babbling while under the influence of datura root. The following morning, Youngman finds Abner's bloodless body on the floor of his shack, and nearby he discovers a dead shepherd and most of his flock.

Tribal Council chairman Walker Chee has discovered a stratum of oil shales in Maskai Canyon, the most sacred ground in the tribe's domain. Walker is dynamiting the caves in an effort to unleash oil, and is planning to sell the rights to process them to tycoon Roger Piggott of Peabody Oil. Walker is desperate to keep word of the attacks from leaking to the media before he completes the deal.

Although common sense tells him otherwise, Youngman's faith in tribal beliefs and superstitions leads him to suspect the unexplained deaths may be connected to Abner's spell. British scientist Philip Payne is certain they are the work of vampire bats infected with bubonic plague. As bats spread throughout the area, swarming through a missionary group's campsite and infecting everyone in their path, Philip and Youngman join forces with Anne Dillon, a young white medical student who runs a ramshackle clinic on the reservation and is in love with Youngman. They track the bats to their lair and eventually destroy them.

== Cast ==
- Nick Mancuso as Youngman Duran
- David Warner as Phillip Payne
- Kathryn Harrold as Anne Dillon
- Stephen Macht as Walker Chee
- Strother Martin as Selwyn
- Ben Piazza as Roger Piggott
- George Clutesi as Abner Tasupi
- Donald Hotton as John Franklin
- Charles Hallahan as Henry
- Alice Hirson as Claire Franklin
- Judith Novgrod as Judy
- Pat Corley as Veterinarian
- Peter Prouse as Doctor

== Production ==
This was Arthur Hiller's only horror film. The film was shot on location in Albuquerque, Santa Fe, and Cubero, New Mexico. The soundtrack includes "Lucille" by Kenny Rogers and "Don't It Make My Brown Eyes Blue" by Crystal Gayle. The bats were the creation of special effects artist Carlo Rambaldi, who previously had worked on King Kong and Close Encounters of the Third Kind.

== Critical reception ==
When the film was first released in 1979, it failed, both critically and financially, but has gone on to be a cult classic. Vincent Canby of The New York Times called the film "not very horrifying" and thought "it looks as if it had been put together from a child's instruction book." He added, "The screenplay... is terrible and the special effects third-rate." Additionally, Time Out New York said the film "never really takes off" and added, "Hiller's direction simply plods to a corny and unsatisfactory ending after getting bogged down in subplots concerning whale-oil prospectors, Indian religious mumbo-jumbo, and inter-tribal rivalries." And Channel 4 observed, "Quite why Hiller was selected to direct this suspense shocker is the most interesting thing about the project. A filmmaker who has made a speciality of showing reverence for platitudes has no jurisdiction over a piece of schlock nonsense about bat-killers in the Arizona desert."

The film also won Worst Picture at the 1979 Stinkers Bad Movie Awards. When the Expansion Project redid the ballot in 2004, the film was listed with the following:

- Least "Special" Special Effects (nominated)
- Worst Picture
- Worst Director for Hiller (dishonourable mention)
- Worst Supporting Actor for Strother Martin (dishonourable mention)
- Worst Screenplay (dishonourable mention)
- Worst Non-Human for The Killer Bats (dishonourable mention)

=== Cult reputation ===
In recent years, Nightwing has acquired a growing cult of devoted admirers. In 2018, for example, author Lee Gambin praised the film as "extremely well paced and great fun." He further noted that "the film is a great exploration of social change and race relations...Nightwing is an interesting and smart movie." And scholar John Edgar Browning labeled Nightwing an "Eco-Gothic Western." He further stated the movie creates a narrative space in which "real solutions to impending ecological threats are made possible through an indigenous spirituality that is fundamentally ecologically grounded." Also, author John Caps notes the eerie tone of the film's musical score, composed by Henry Mancini. Caps observes that Mancini actually instructed his musicians (mostly strings) to "de-tune" their instruments a quarter-tone downward when scoring the movie's nocturnal scenes. It was further reported that many in Mancini's orchestra were worried about damaging their own sense of hearing.

Quentin Tarantino wrote "something about Nightwing... bugs me more. Partly because you feel the movie wants it to be Abner's curse. It just doesn't have the balls to commit to it."

== Home media ==
In 2018, Nightwing was released in Blu-ray format by Mill Creek Entertainment as part of a double-feature package with Shadow of the Hawk (1976). The film is also available in America in DVD format as a stand-alone feature.

Awards
Preceded by If Ever I See You Again and Renaldo and Clara	Stinker Award for Worst Picture; 1979 Stinkers Bad Movie Awards	Succeeded by Popeye
