= Crime Writers of Canada Award for Best Novel =

Literary award category

The Crime Writers of Canada Award for Best Novel is an annual literary award, presented as part of the Crime Writers of Canada Awards of Excellence program to honour books judged as the best crime novel published by a Canadian crime writer in the previous year.

== 1980s ==
Year	Writer	Novel	Ref
1984
1984	Eric Wright	The Night the Gods Smiled	
1984	William Deverell	Mecca	
1984	Ted Wood	Dead in the Water	
1985
1985	Howard Engel	Murder Sees the Light	
1985	William Deverell	The Dance of Shiva	
1985	Douglas Glover	Precious	
1985	John Reeves	Murder Before Matins	
1985	Eric Wright	Smoke Detector	
1986
1986	Eric Wright	Death in the Old Country	
1986	Maurice Gagnon	The Inner Ring	
1986	Anthony Hyde	The Red Fox	
1986	John Reeves	Murder with Muskets	
1986	L. R. Wright	The Suspect	
1987
1987	Edward O. Phillips	Buried on Sunday	
1987	Timothy Findley	The Telling of Lies	
1987	Alexander Law	To an Easy Grave	
1987	Ted Wood	Fool's Gold	
1987	Eric Wright	A Single Death	
1988
1988	Carol Shields	Swann	
1988	Joseph Louis	Madelaine	
1988	Anna Porter	Mortal Sins	
1988	Eric Wright	A Body Surrounded by Water	
1989
1989	Chris Scott	Jack	
1989	William Deverell	Platinum Blues	
1989	Laurence Gough	Death on a #8 Hook (Silent Knives)	
1989	Peter Robinson	A Dedicated Man	

== 1990s ==
Year	Writer	Novel	Ref
1990
1990	Laurence Gough	Hot Shots	
1990	Jack Batten	Straight No Chaser	
1990	John Brady	Unholy Ground	
1990	William Deverell	Mindfield	
1990	Peter Robinson	The Hanging Valley	
1991
1991	L. R. Wright	A Chill Rain in January	
1991	John Brady	Kaddish in Dublin	
1991	Laurence Gough	Serious Crimes	
1991	Brian Moore	Lies of Silence	
1991	John Lawrence Reynolds	And Leave Her Lay Dying	
1991	Peter Robinson	Caedmon's Song	
1992
1992	Peter Robinson	Past Reason Hated	
1992	Laurence Gough	Accidental Deaths	
1992	L. R. Wright	Fall from Grace	
1993
1993	Carsten Stroud	Lizardskin	
1993	Gail Bowen	The Wandering Soul Murders	
1993	Laurence Gough	Fall Down Easy	
1993	Peter Robinson	Wednesday's Child	
1993	Medora Sale	Pursued by Shadows	
1994
1994	John Lawrence Reynolds	Gypsy Sins	
1994	John Brady	All Souls	
1994	Howard Engel	There Was an Old Woman	
1994	William Gibson	Virtual Light	
1994	Gregory Ward	Water Damage	
1994	L. R. Wright	Prized Possessions	
1995
1995	Gail Bowen	A Colder Kind of Death	
1995	Peter Abrahams	Lights Out	
1995	John Brady	The Good Life	
1995	John Lawrence Reynolds	Solitary Dancer	
1995	L. R. Wright	A Touch of Panic	
1996
1996	L. R. Wright	Mother Love	
1996	William Deverell	Street Legal	
1996	Alison Gordon	Striking Out	
1996	Laurence Gough	Heartbreaker	
1996	Peter Robinson	No Cure for Love	
1997
1997	Peter Robinson	Innocent Graves	
1997	Margaret Atwood	Alias Grace	
1997	Martin S. Cohen	Light from Dead Stars	
1997	Sparkle Hayter	Nice Girls Finish Last	
1997	Frank Smith	Fatal Flaw	
1998
1998	William Deverell	Trial of Passion	
1998	Rosemary Aubert	Free Reign	
1998	C. C. Benison	Death at Sandringham House	
1998	John Spencer Hill	Ghirlandaio's Daughter	
1998	Peter Robinson	Dead Right (Blood at the Root)	
1998	Robert J. Sawyer	Illegal Alien	
1999
1999	Nora Kelly	Old Wounds	
1999	Gail Bowen	Verdict in Blood	
1999	Scott Mackay	Cold Comfort	
1999	Caroline Roe	Remedy for Treason	
1999	Jean Ruryk	Next Week Will Be Better	
1999	Michelle Spring	Standing in the Shadows	

== 2000s ==
Year	Writer	Novel	Ref
2000
2000	Rosemary Aubert	The Feast of Stephen	
2000	Lisa Appignanesi	The Dead of Winter	
2000	William Deverell	Slander	
2000	John Farrow	City of Ice	
2000	Peter Robinson	In a Dry Season	
2001
2001	Peter Robinson	Cold Is the Grave	
2001	Giles Blunt	Forty Words for Sorrow	
2001	Brad Smith	One Eyed Jacks	
2001	Eric Wright	The Kidnapping of Rosie Dawn	
2001	L. R. Wright	Kidnap	
2002
2002	Michelle Spring	In the Midnight Hour	
2002	William Deverell	The Laughing Falcon	
2002	John Farrow	Ice Lake	
2002	Rick Mofina	Cold Fear	
2002	Peter Robinson	Aftermath	
2003
2003	Rick Mofina	Blood of Others	
2003	Lou Allin	Blackflies Are Murder	
2003	Barbara Fradkin	Once Upon a Time	
2003	Nora Kelly	Hot Pursuit	
2003	Kathy Reichs	Grave Secrets	
2004
2004	Giles Blunt	The Delicate Storm	
2004	Mary Jane Maffini	Lament for a Lounge Lizard	
2004	Kim Moritsugu	The Glenwood Treasure	
2004	David Rotenberg	The Hua Shan Hospital Murders	
2004	Peter Robinson	The Summer That Never Was (Close to Home)	
2005
2005	Barbara Fradkin	Fifth Son	
2005	Gail Bowen	The Last Good Day	
2005	Lyn Hamilton	The Magyar Venus	
2005	Peter Robinson	Playing with Fire	
2005	Mark Zuehlke	Sweep Lotus	
2006
2006	William Deverell	April Fool	
2006	Rick Blechta	Cemetery of the Nameless	
2006	Giles Blunt	Black Fly Season	
2006	Alex Brett	Cold Dark Matter	
2006	Peter Robinson	Strange Affair	
2007
2007	Barbara Fradkin	Honour Among Men	
2007	Linwood Barclay	Lone Wolf	
2007	Emma Cole	Every Secret Thing	
2007	Kathy Reichs	Break No Bones	
2007	Peter Robinson	Piece of My Heart	
2008
2008	Jon Redfern	Trumpets Sound No More	
2008	Linwood Barclay	No Time for Goodbye	
2008	Terry Carroll	Snow Candy	
2008	Maureen Jennings	A Journeyman to Grief	
2008	Louise Penny	The Cruelest Month	
2009
2009	Linwood Barclay	Too Close to Home	
2009	Maureen Jennings	The K Handshape	
2009	James W. Nichol	Transgression	
2009	Louise Penny	The Murder Stone	
2009	Michael E. Rose	The Tsunami File	

== 2010s ==
Year	Writer	Novel	Ref
2010
2010	Howard Shrier	High Chicago	
2010	Anthony Bidulka	Aloha, Candy Hearts	
2010	R. J. Harlick	Arctic Blue Death	
2010	Lee Lamothe	Finger's Twist	
2010	James W. Nichol	Death Spiral	
2011
2011	Louise Penny	Bury Your Dead	
2011	C. B. Forrest	Slow Recoil	
2011	Mike Knowles	In Plain Sight	
2011	Jeffrey Moore	The Extinction Club	
2011	Michael Van Rooy	A Criminal to Remember	
2012
2012	Peter Robinson	Before the Poison	
2012	Alan Bradley	I Am Half-Sick of Shadows	
2012	William Deverell	I'll See You in My Dreams	
2012	Louise Penny	A Trick of the Light	
2012	Robert Rotenberg	The Guilty Plea	
2013
2013	Giles Blunt	Until the Night	
2013	Linwood Barclay	Trust Your Eyes	
2013	Sean Chercover	The Trinity Game	
2013	Stephen Miller	The Messenger	
2013	Carsten Stroud	Niceville	
2014
2014	Seán Haldane	The Devil's Making	
2014	John Brooke	Walls of a Mind	
2014	Lee Lamothe	Presto Variations	
2014	Howard Shrier	Miss Montreal	
2014	Simone St. James	An Inquiry into Love and Death	
2015
2015	C. C. Humphreys	Plague: Murder Has a New Friend	
2015	Brenda Chapman	Cold Mourning	
2015	Barbara Fradkin	None So Blind	
2015	Maureen Jennings	No Known Grave	
2015	Alen Mattich	Killing Pilgrim	
2016
2016	Peter Kirby	Open Season	
2016	Peggy Blair	Hungry Ghosts	
2016	John Farrow	The Storm Murders	
2016	Andrew Hunt	A Killing in Zion	
2016	Inger Ash Wolfe	The Night Bell	
2017
2017	Donna Morrissey	The Fortunate Brother	
2017	Kelley Armstrong	City of the Lost	
2017	Michael Helm	After James	
2017	Maureen Jennings	Dead Ground in Between	
2017	Janet Kellough	Wishful Seeing	
2018
2018	Peter Robinson	Sleeping in the Ground	
2018	Gail Bowen	The Winners' Circle	
2018	John MacLachlan Gray	The White Angel	
2018	Robyn Harding	The Party	
2018	Rio Youers	The Forgotten Girl	
2019
2019	Anne Emery	Though the Heavens Fall	
2019	Ron Corbett	Cape Diamond	
2019	Lisa Gabriele	The Winters	
2019	Louise Penny	Kingdom of the Blind	
2019	Loreth Anne White	The Girl in the Moss	

== 2020s ==
Year	Writer	Novel	Ref
2020
2020	Michael Christie	Greenwood	
2020	Ian Hamilton	Fate	
2020	Nicole Lundrigan	Hideaway	
2020	Melissa Stapley	The Last Resort	
2020	Loreth Anne White	In the Dark	
2021
2021	Will Ferguson	The Finder	
2021	Marjorie Celona	How a Woman Becomes a Lake	
2021	Cecilia Ekbäck	The Historians	
2021	Thomas King	Obsidian	
2021	Roz Nay	Hurry Home	
2022
2022	Dietrich Kalteis	Under an Outlaw Moon	
2022	Linwood Barclay	Find You First	
2022	Daniel Kalla	Lost Immunity	
2022	Shari Lapena	Not a Happy Family	
2022	Roz Nay	The Hunted	
2023
2023	Anthony Bidulka	Going to Beautiful	
2023	Linwood Barclay	Take Your Breath Away	
2023	Nicole Lundrigan	An Unthinkable Thing	
2023	Catherine McKenzie	Please Join Us	
2023	Shelly Sanders	Daughters of the Occupation	
2024
2024	Loreth Anne White	The Maid's Diary	
2024	Robyn Harding	The Drowning Woman	
2024	Shari Lapena	Everyone Here Is Lying	
2024	Scott Thornley	Middlemen	
2024	Sam Wiebe	Sunset and Jericho	
