= Moritsugu =

Moritsugu is a Japanese-language surname. Notable people with the name include:

- Jon Moritsugu (born 1965), American cult/underground filmmaker
- Kenneth P. Moritsugu (born 1945), American physician and public health administrator
- Kim Moritsugu, Canadian writer
- Kohji Moritsugu (born 1943), Japanese actor
