= Too Close to Home =

Too Close to Home may refer to:

- Too Close to Home (novel), a 2008 novel by Linwood Barclay
- Too Close to Home (TV series), a 2016 TV series created by Tyler Perry
- "Too Close to Home" (Superman & Lois), a 2023 TV episode
