= Selkirk College =

Community college in British Columbia, Canada

- Motto: Best of all, inquire
- Type: Public
- Established: 1966
- Affiliations: CICan
- Endowment: $34,891,007
- President: Maggie Matear
- Students: 1,318 FTE (2024-25 FTE)
- Location: West Kootenay and Boundary regions in British Columbia: Castlegar, Nelson (3 campuses), Trail, Grand Forks
- Colours: Blue Spruce & Tree Green
- Website: www.selkirk.ca

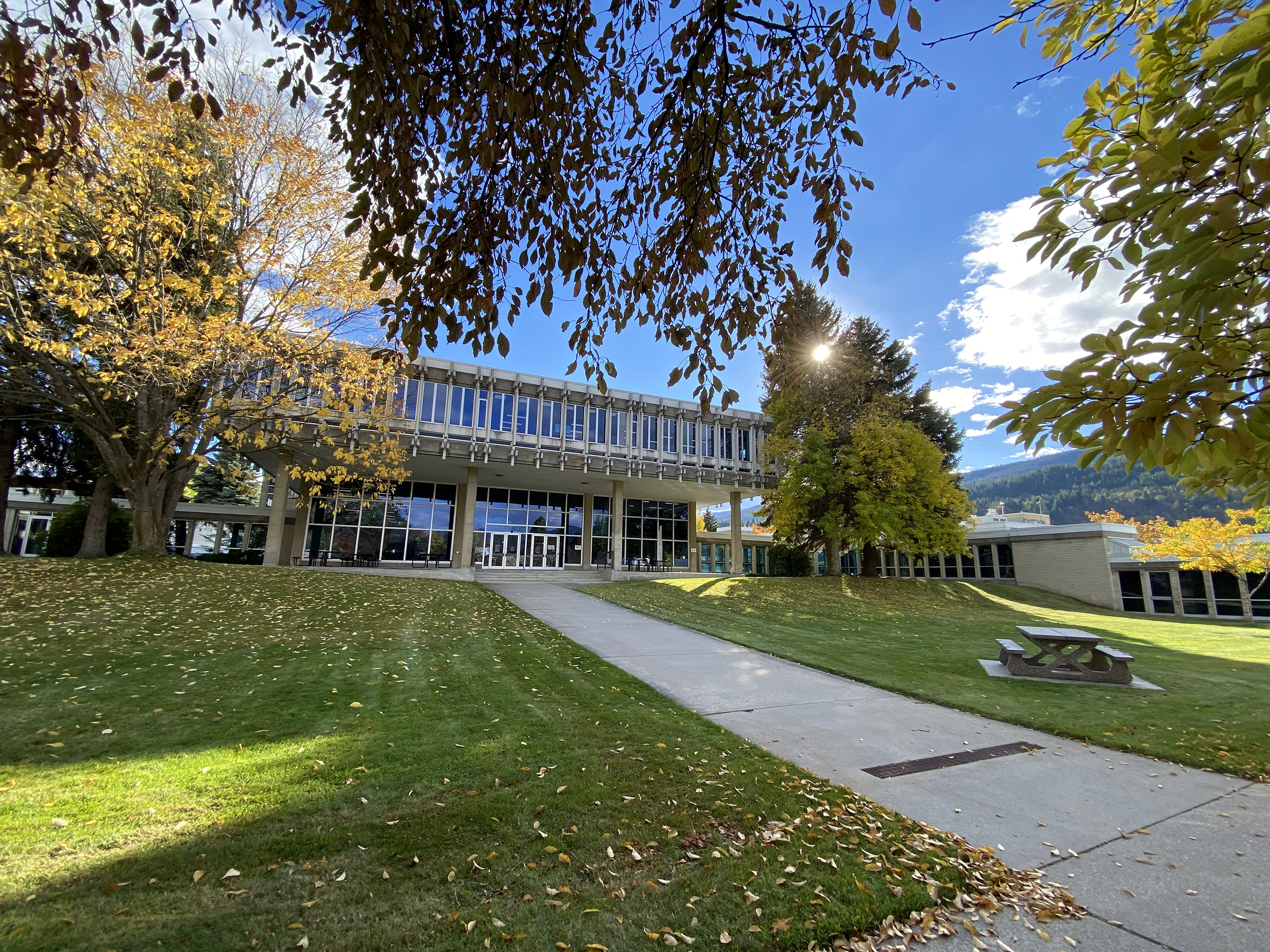
Castlegar Campus courtyard

Selkirk College is a public college founded in 1966 with its main campus in Castlegar, British Columbia, Canada. The college has student housing at its Castlegar and Nelson campuses. Selkirk College's strengths include hands-on education, learning with the land, building connections, transfer pathways, and cultivating sustainability. The college has close to 60 certificate, diploma, and degree programs. Notable programs include Rural Pre-Medicine, Ski Resort Operations & Management, Contemporary Music & Technology, Digital Fabrication & Design, Nursing, Pharmacy Technician, and the School of Environment & Geomatics.

== Campuses ==
Selkirk College has six campuses and learning centres across the West Kootenay and Kootenay Boundary regions:

- Castlegar Campus
- Grand Forks Campus
- Silver King Campus
- Tenth Street Campus
- Trail Campus
- Victoria Street Campus

== Programs ==
Selkirk currently has 1,239 students in eight locations and offers a variety of academic, career, vocational and technical programs. Programs are offered part-time, full-time and online through the following schools of study:

- Academic Upgrading & Development
- Arts & Technology
- Business
- Environment & Geomatics
- Health & Human Services
- Hospitality & Tourism
- Industry & Trades Training
- Selkirk International
- University Arts & Sciences

== Student life ==
=== Local arts, culture and heritage ===
Students of Selkirk College have access to a variety of local arts, culture and heritage facilities within the municipalities of Castlegar, Grand Forks, Kaslo, Nelson, Rossland and Trail. Museums and galleries include the Doukhobor Discovery Centre, Kootenay Gallery, Langham Cultural Centre, Oxygen Art Centre, Quoynary Canada Rossland Art Gallery, Rossland Museum & Discovery Centre, Touchstones Museum, and VISAC Gallery.

=== On campus recreation ===
- Clubs, fitness classes and drop-in sports are offered within both Selkirk gymnasiums (located on the Castlegar and Tenth Street Campus).
- An extensive walking trail system surrounds the Castlegar Campus. The campus is also home to a gymnasium that houses a climbing wall, squash court, and weight room.
- The Mary Hall building on Nelson's Tenth Street Campus includes a gymnasium, weight room, and Cube Climbing Centre.

=== Student housing ===
Selkirk College currently has two student housing buildings that can collectively house 209 students. Student housing at the Castlegar Campus offers 100 beds and Nelson's Tenth Street Campus offers 109 beds. A new student housing development has been confirmed to commence in 2022. A new building at the Castlegar Campus will provide 112 new beds, and 36 beds will be offered in a new building on the Silver King Campus in Nelson.

== Notable alumni ==
- Kiesza, musician
- Mitch Merrett, record producer
- Roz Nay, novelist.

== See also ==
- List of institutes and colleges in British Columbia
- List of universities in British Columbia
- Higher education in British Columbia
- Education in Canada
