= Michelle Spring =

Canadian sociologist and writer

Michelle Stanworth (born 1947) is a Canadian sociologist and writer of mystery fiction, who has published both academic work under her own name and mystery fiction under the pen name Michelle Spring. She is most noted for her 2001 novel In the Midnight Hour, which won the Arthur Ellis Award for Best Novel in 2002.

Born in Victoria, British Columbia, Spring spent much of her adult life in Cambridge, England, where she was a professor of sociology at Anglia Ruskin University. She published her debut novel, Every Breath You Take, in 1994, and received an Arthur Ellis Award nomination for Best First Novel in 1995. Her third novel, Standing in the Shadows, was published in 1998 and garnered Spring an Arthur Ellis Award nomination for Best Novel in 1999.

Most of her crime novels centred on private detective Laura Principal. She has also published one crime novel with a different protagonist, a non-fiction guide to mystery fiction writing, and several non-fiction books on sociology.

== Works ==
=== as Michelle Stanworth ===
- Gender and Schooling: A Study of Sexual Divisions in the Classroom (1981)
- Women and the Public Sphere: A Critique of Sociology and Politics (1984)
- Reproductive Technologies: Gender, Motherhood, and Medicine (1987)

=== as Michelle Spring ===
- Every Breath You Take (1994)
- Running for Shelter (1995)
- Standing in the Shadows (1998)
- Nights in White Satin (1999)
- In the Midnight Hour (2001)
- The Night Lawyer (2006)
- The Arvon Book of Crime Writing (2012)
