= Forty Words for Sorrow =

2000 crime novel by Giles Blunt

- First edition
- Author: Giles Blunt
- Language: English
- Genre: Crime novel
- Publisher: Random House Canada
- Publication date: 2000
- Publication place: Canada
- Media type: Print (Hardback)
- Pages: 272
- ISBN: 0-679-31057-6
- OCLC: 44019295
- Dewey Decimal: 813/.54 21
- LC Class: PS3552.L887 F67 2000

Forty Words for Sorrow is a 2000 crime novel from Canadian novelist Giles Blunt, and the first to feature his protagonists John Cardinal and Lise Delorme. Blunt had previous published one other novel, Cold Eye, but this was his first crime novel, and the first to be a critical and commercial success. The novel won the Crime Writers' Association Silver Dagger in 2001, and was shortlisted for the Arthur Ellis Award for Best Novel.

== Adaptation ==
In 2015, Sienna Films and eOne Entertainment announced that a television adaptation, Cardinal, was in development. The six-episode series, starring Billy Campbell as John Cardinal and Karine Vanasse as Lise Delorme, premiered on CTV and Super Écran on January 25, 2017 and on Hulu in the US in July 2017.
