= The Steps (film) =

2015 comedy film

- Film poster
- Directed by: Andrew Currie
- Written by: Robyn Harding
- Starring: Emmanuelle Chriqui
- Cinematography: Robert Aschmann
- Edited by: Jorge Weisz
- Release dates: 14 September 2015 (TIFF); 3 June 2016 (Canada)
- Running time: 98 minutes
- Country: Canada
- Language: English

The Steps is a 2015 Canadian comedy film directed by Andrew Currie. It was screened in the Contemporary World Cinema section of the 2015 Toronto International Film Festival.

== Plot ==
Jeff (Jason Ritter), a Wall Street power broker going through a slump in business and relationship, and Marla (Emmanuelle Chriqui), a party-loving Princeton graduate, are siblings. Their father Ed (James Brolin) is a wealthy old man who has remarried and moved to Lake Country in Ontario, Canada. The siblings resentfully arrive with their Dad's lake house to meet his new wife, an ex-waitress, Sherry (Christine Lahti) and her children: redneck David (Benjamin Arthur) and his wife Tammy (Kate Corbett), failed musician Keith (Steven McCarthy) and academically inclined Sam (Vinay Virmani). Ed and Sherry announce their plans to adopt a child in an attempt to gel the new family together. The movie attempts to portray a comic clash between two cultures and two families which quickly descends into chaos.

== Cast ==
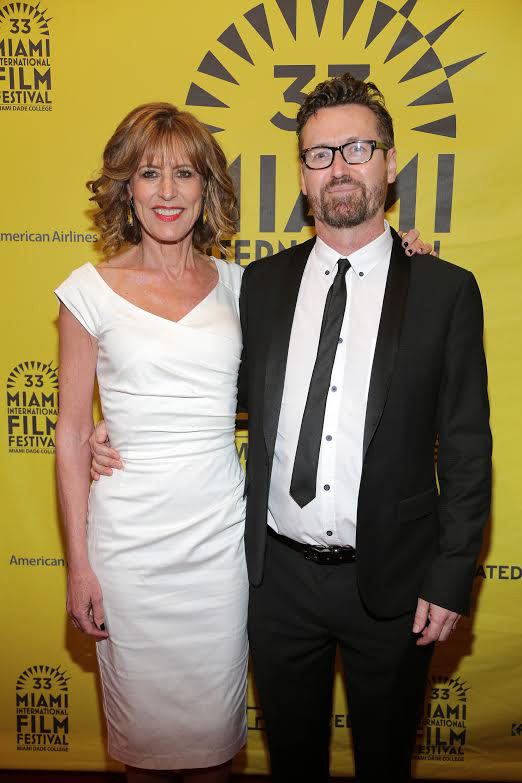
Christine Lahti and Andrew Currie at the Miami Film Festival in 2016

- Emmanuelle Chriqui as Marla
- James Brolin as Ed
- Jason Ritter as Jeff
- Christine Lahti as Sherry
- Naomi Snieckus as Ellen
- Kate Corbett as Tammy
- Rainbow Francks as Dean
- Steven McCarthy as Keith
- Vinay Virmani as Sam
- Benjamin Arthur as David
