= Diamonds (Canadian TV series) =

- Starring: Nicholas Campbell; Peggy Smithhart; Tony Rosato; Roland Magdane; Alan Feiman
- Theme music composer: Dominic Troiano
- Countries of origin: Canada; France
- Original language: English
- No. of seasons: 2
- No. of episodes: 44

Production
- Executive producers: Sonny Grosso; Larry Jacobson
- Running time: 60 minutes
- Production companies: Alliance Entertainment; Grosso-Jacobson Productions

Original release
- Network: Global (Canada); CBS (United States)
- Release: September 22, 1987 – December 3, 1989

Diamonds is a French and Canadian-produced television series, which aired from September 22, 1987, to 1989. The show starred Nicholas Campbell as Mike Devitt and Peggy Smithhart as Christina Towne, former actors who had met and married while playing private investigators on a TV series called Two of Diamonds, and continued to work together as real private investigators after both their divorce and the cancellation of their show.

The show was frequently compared to the American series Moonlighting. In a direct nod to the comparison, one episode actually featured an encounter with a character who mistook Devitt and Towne for Bruce Willis and Cybill Shepherd.

The cast also included Roland Magdane, Geraint Wyn Davies and Tony Rosato. Campbell was also an occasional writer for the series.

Produced by Alliance Entertainment, the series aired on Global in Canada, and in a late night slot on CBS in the United States, as well as on the USA Network. It was one of several Canadian-produced drama series to air in the CBS Late Night block of crime dramas — others included Adderly, Night Heat and Hot Shots. Of those shows, it was the only one to explicitly acknowledge that it was set in Toronto.

Diamonds also aired on RTÉ Television in Ireland.

== Cast ==
- Nicholas Campbell as Mike Devitt
- Peggy Smithhart as Christina Towne
- Roland Magdane as Rene (season 2)
- Tony Rosato as Lieutenant Lou Gianetti
- Alan Feiman as Darryl

== Episodes ==
=== Season 1: 1987–88 ===
No. overall	No. in season	Title	Directed by	Written by	Original release date
1	1	"Poison Pill"	Miklós Lente	Jaron Summers	September 22, 1987
2	2	"Kiss & Tell"	George Mendeluk	Unknown	September 29, 1987
3	3	"There Once Was a Lady from Katmandu"	Timothy Bond	Gabrielle St. George	October 6, 1987
4	4	"Here Comes the Bride"	René Bonnière	Jaron Summers	October 13, 1987
5	5	"Domestic Spirits"	Patrick Corbett	Philip Rosenberg	October 20, 1987
6	6	"Class Reunion"	Gilbert M. Shilton	J.K.E. Rose	November 3, 1987
7	7	"Good Hands"	Patrick Corbett	Unknown	November 10, 1987
8	8	"The Smiling Mortician"	Gilbert M. Shilton	Giles Blunt	November 17, 1987
9	9	"Fan Club"	Unknown	Unknown	January 5, 1988
10	10	"Little Girl Lost"	Patrick Corbett	Unknown	January 12, 1988
11	11	"When the Wind Blows"	Unknown	Unknown	February 2, 1988
12	12	"Ay, There's the Rub"	Unknown	Unknown	February 9, 1988
13	13	"There's No Business"	René Bonnière	J.K.E. Rose	February 23, 1988
14	14	"Family Plot"	Unknown	Unknown	March 1, 1988
15	15	"Sweetheart Deal"	William Fruet	Chris Haddock	March 8, 1988
16	16	"The Final Cut"	Patrick Corbett	Unknown	March 29, 1988
17	17	"Man with a Gun"	Unknown	Unknown	April 5, 1988
18	18	"Where There's a Will"	Unknown	Unknown	April 12, 1988
19	19	"The Whistle Blower"	Unknown	Unknown	May 3, 1988
20	20	"Ghost Writer"	Unknown	Unknown	May 10, 1988
21	21	"Exposure"	René Bonnière	Peter Lauterman, Angelo Stea	May 17, 1988
22	22	"Goodbye Cabin"	Gilbert M. Shilton	Chris Haddock, Jeremy Hole	May 24, 1988

=== Season 2: 1988–89 ===
No. overall	No. in season	Title	Directed by	Written by	Original release date
23	1	"A Couple of Couples"	Mario Azzopardi	Nick Arnold	December 4, 1988
24	2	"All Bets Off"	Mark Sobel	R.B. Carney	December 11, 1988
25	3	"Leap of Faith"	Unknown	Peter Lauterman, Angelo Stea	December 18, 1988
26	4	"By the Book"	Randy Bradshaw	Nick Arnold	January 10, 1989
27	5	"Separate Ways"	Mark Sobel	Unknown	January 24, 1989
28	6	"Life is a Lot Like Hockey"	René Bonnière	Chris Auer	February 7, 1989
29	7	"Family Business"	Donald Shebib	Jeff F. King	February 21, 1989
30	8	"Le Cheval: Part 1"	Unknown	Unknown	April 16, 1989
31	9	"Le Cheval: Part 2"	Unknown	Unknown	April 23, 1989
32	10	"Back in Fashion"	Roger Andrieux	Barbara Samuels	April 30, 1989
33	11	"Coming of Age"	Donald Shebib	Gerry Davis	May 14, 1989
34	12	"Doctor, Lawyer, Liar, Thief"	Unknown	Unknown	July 16, 1989
35	13	"Lady Blue"	Nicholas Campbell	Jeff F. King	August 13, 1989
36	14	"Hot Property"	Donald Shebib	Jim Henshaw	August 20, 1989
37	15	"Payola"	Randy Bradshaw	Ashley Collie	August 27, 1989
38	16	"Voodoo"	Randy Bradshaw	Peter Mohan	1989
39	17	"The List"	TBD	TBD	1989
40	18	"Street Song"	TBD	TBD	1989
41	19	"Dinosaur"	TBD	Giles Blunt	1989
42	20	"13 Bis"	Bruno Gantillon	Nicholas Campbell	1989
43	21	"Death Kiss"	Paolo Barzman	Yves Lavandier	1989
44	22	"The Silver Leaf"	Paolo Barzman	Jeff F. King	December 3, 1989
