= Fear the Worst =

Novel by Linwood Barclay

- Book cover
- Author: Linwood Barclay
- Cover artist: Getty Images & Alamy
- Language: English
- Genre: Thriller
- Publisher: Orion Publishing Group
- Publication date: 2009
- Publication place: Canada

Fear the Worst is a novel written by Canadian author Linwood Barclay.
