= Cardinal (TV series) =

Canadian television series

- Genre: Crime drama Thriller
- Created by: Aubrey Nealon
- Based on: Cardinal series by Giles Blunt
- Written by: Aubrey Nealon; Russ Cochrane; Sarah Dodd; Jennica Harper; Alison Lea Bingeman
- Directed by: Daniel Grou; Jeff Renfroe; Nathan Morlando
- Starring: Billy Campbell; Karine Vanasse; Glen Gould; Eric Hicks; Kristen Thomson; Deborah Hay; Alanna Bale; David Richmond-Peck; James Downing; James Thomas; Zach Smadu
- Composer: Todor Kobakov
- Country of origin: Canada
- Original language: English
- No. of seasons: 4
- No. of episodes: 24

Production
- Executive producers: Jennifer Kawaja; Julia Sereny; Daniel Grou; Jocelyn Hamilton; Armand Leo; Aubrey Nealon; Sarah Dodd; Patrick Tarr
- Producer: Jessica Daniel
- Production locations: Sudbury and North Bay, Ontario
- Cinematography: Dylan Macleod; Steve Cosens
- Editor: Teresa De Luca
- Running time: 40 minutes
- Production companies: Sienna Films; Entertainment One; Bell Media

Original release
- Network: CTV; Super Écran
- Release: January 25, 2017 – May 11, 2020

Cardinal is a Canadian crime drama television series, which was first broadcast January 25, 2017, on CTV (in English) and Super Écran (in French). The series adapts the novels of crime writer Giles Blunt, focusing on police detective John Cardinal (Billy Campbell) and his partner Lise Delorme (Karine Vanasse), who investigate crimes in the fictional city of Algonquin Bay.

Across six episodes, the first season adapts the first John Cardinal novel Forty Words for Sorrow (2000), which focuses on the investigation of the murder of a young girl. On February 28, 2017, CTV renewed Cardinal for a second and third season, each containing six episodes. The second season adapts Blunt's third Cardinal novel, Blackfly Season, while the third adapted the novels By the Time You Read This and Crime Machine, the fourth and fifth novels in the series. The fourth and final season adapts the sixth novel, Until the Night.

== Premise ==
=== Season 1: Forty Words for Sorrow ===
John Cardinal (Billy Campbell) is a troubled and brooding police officer in Algonquin Bay, who was removed from the homicide squad as a result of chief Noelle Dyson's (Kristen Thomson) belief that he had become obsessed with his investigation of a missing Native Canadian girl. When the girl's body finally turns up, he is reassigned to the case with a new partner, Lise Delorme (Karine Vanasse). What he does not know is that Delorme has been assigned to investigate him as part of a corruption probe that has identified Cardinal as possibly collaborating with a local drug dealer. The investigation widens when another missing person case with similar patterns leads Cardinal to believe that a serial killer may be active in the area.

=== Season 2: Blackfly Season ===
A young woman suffering from amnesia after having been shot in the head appears in Algonquin Bay. Soon mutilated bodies, in accordance with some occult religious rituals, are discovered. The bodies are members of a local group of bikers known for trafficking drugs. John Cardinal and the team suspect that someone is trying to replace the gang in the drug trade. The mental health of his wife still worries him. Musgrave thinks he has finally found the evidence he is looking for.

=== Season 3: By the Time You Read This ===
The suspicious death of Cardinal's wife Catherine coincides with a double murder, and Delorme is ordered to take the lead in the murder investigation. Reluctant to believe that Catherine committed suicide, Cardinal begins investigating other possibilities, whilst dealing with a succession of anonymous letters blaming him for the event. Noelle Dyson, recovering from the death of her sister, tries to reason with another prospective suicide and is devastated when she fails to prevent him killing himself.

=== Season 4: Until the Night ===
After a prominent politician's husband is abducted and then left to die from exposure, Cardinal and Delorme suspect that a hired killer is targeting those close to four people, out of revenge for a cover-up in their past. Cardinal and Delorme grow closer but this case will be their last together as Delorme takes a new job in Toronto.

== Cast and characters ==
=== Main ===
- Billy Campbell as Det. John Cardinal
- Karine Vanasse as Det. Lise Delorme
- Kristen Thomson as Det. Sgt. Noelle Dyson
- Deborah Hay as Catherine Cardinal (Seasons 1–3)
- Alanna Bale as Kelly Cardinal
- Glen Gould as Det. Jerry Commanda
- James Downing as Det. Ian McLeod
- Zach Smadu as Det. Ash Kular (Season 2 – present)
- Eric Hicks as Const. Derek K. Fox
- David Richmond-Peck as Sgt. Malcolm Musgrave (Seasons 1–2)
- James Thomas as Det. Hannam (Season 1)

=== Recurring ===
==== Introduced in season one ====
- Brendan Fletcher as Eric Fraser
- Allie MacDonald as Edie Soames
- Robert Naylor as Keith London
- Gail Maurice as Dorothy Pine
- Conrad Coates as Coroner Barnhouse
- Fiona Highet as Tammy Lidstrom
- Trenna Keating as Kristin Baldwin
- Lawrence Bayne as Francis
- Gord Rand as Woody
- Alden Adair as Josh
- Kelly Van der Burg as Margo
- Dylan Colton as Todd Curry

==== Introduced in season two ====
- Bruce Ramsay as Ray Northwind
- Alex Paxton-Beesley as Red
- Jonathan Keltz as Kevin Tait
- Dan Petronijevic as Leon
- Kris Holden-Ried as Lasalle
- Kevin Hanchard as Det. Sgt. Alan Clegg
- Brock Morgan as Toof
- Kathryn Alexandre as Abby Harris
- Nicolette Pearse as Rachel Wells
- Greg Hovanessian as Zack
- Asivak Koostachin as Jordan Akiwenzie
- Stephen Ouimette as Dr. Bell

==== Introduced in season three ====
- Aaron Ashmore as Randall Wishart
- Susan Coyne as Helen Bell
- Sophia Lauchlin Hirt as Nikki
- Tom Jackson as Lloyd Kreeger
- Rya Kihlstedt as Sharlene Winston
- Jennifer Podemski as Wendy Duchene
- Alex Ozerov as Jack
- Nick Serino as Lemur
- Devery Jacobs as Sam Duchene

==== Introduced in season four ====
- Carmen Moore as Sheila Gagne
- Shawn Doyle as Scott Riley
- Linda Goranson as Adele
- Currie Graham as Neil Cuthbert

== Episodes ==
Season	Title	Episodes	Originally released	
Season	Title	Episodes	First released	Last released
1	Forty Words for Sorrow	6	January 25, 2017	March 1, 2017
2	Blackfly Season	6	January 4, 2018	February 8, 2018
3	By the Time You Read This	6	January 24, 2019	March 6, 2019
4	Until the Night	6	April 6, 2020	May 11, 2020

=== Season 1: Forty Words for Sorrow (2017) ===
No. overall	No. in season	Title	Directed by	Written by	Original release date	Canadian viewers (millions)
1	1	"Cardinal"	Daniel Grou	Aubrey Nealon	January 25, 2017	1.38
The body of a missing young girl, Katie Pine, is found in winter in a disused mineshaft in Northern Ontario. John Cardinal (Billy Campbell), the investigating officer on Katie's case, was removed from the homicide squad because of his obsession with the case. Cardinal is reassigned to the case with a new partner, Lise Delorme (Karine Vanasse). Cardinal suspects the murderer to be a serial killer and tries to connect Katie's case with previous cases of missing minors in the region. Meanwhile, Delorme works on Cardinal's case of serial home robberies, which leads her to Woody (Gord Rand). Police chief Det. Sgt. Noelle Dyson (Kristen Thomson) organizes a memorial for Katie at the local church, but Katie's mother, Dorothy (Gail Maurice), refuses to attend it. At night, Cardinal exchanges a packet with a man named Francis. Cardinal visits his wife, Catherine (Deborah Hay), a photographer who appears to be delusional, at a care center. Cardinal's investigation of the missing minors leads him to an abandoned house, where he finds the body of Todd Curry, a runaway. Dyson asks Delorme to meet RCMP Staff Sergeant Sgt. Malcolm Musgrave (David Richmond-Peck), who has assigned Delorme to investigate Cardinal as part of a corruption probe that has identified him as possibly collaborating with a local drug dealer, Kyle Corbett.
2	2	"Delorme"	Daniel Grou	Aubrey Nealon	February 1, 2017	1.30
Cardinal and Lise leave for Toronto for the autopsy of Todd's body. The body has several marks of torture: a spike is found penetrating his brain and his head is wrapped in audiotape. The tape contains noises from an impaired traffic signal and voices of Katie and the killer, thus connecting both cases. After Cardinal spends time with his daughter, Kelly (Alanna Bale), he reveals to Delorme that his wife is suffering from bipolar disorder and that's why he left behind his daughter and decorated career in Toronto for Algonquin Bay. During the night, Delorme follows Cardinal's car (against Musgrave's orders) to the out-of-town Thunderbird Casino. She sees Cardinal cashing in black-market chips and speculates that this is Cardinal's method of laundering money. Delorme and her domestic partner, Josh, are having problems conceiving a child. A guy and a girl with a partially scarred face, are seen stalking Keith, a young guy with a guitar. The stalkers are later revealed to be Eric and Edie.
3	3	"Edie and Eric"	Daniel Grou	Aubrey Nealon	February 8, 2017	1.04
Keith is kept drugged in the basement of Edie's grandmother's house by Edie and Eric. Concerned that Cardinal is on to her, Delorme digs into his past, including his former partners and cases. Edie works at a pharmacy at the local mall, where Eric visits, carrying Keith's guitar. The police are informed about Keith's disappearance; meanwhile Edie tortures Keith.
4	4	"Woody"	Daniel Grou	Aubrey Nealon	February 15, 2017	N/A
Woody waits outside the mall looking for his next robbery victim, when he spots Eric with the guitar. He follows Eric to Edie's house. Delorme asks Det. Jerry Commanda (Glen Gould) to trace the laundered money at Thunderbird Casino. Commanda questions Francis regarding the chips. Edie panics after seeing the televised police press conference about Keith's disappearance. Cardinal notices that he is being followed by a car. Josh, drunk and angry at Delorme for missing their planned dinner, visits Cardinal at his home and confronts him about Delorme's behaviour. Josh tells Cardinal that Delorme's transfer to homicide is a temporary assignment. Woody breaks into Edie's house to steal the guitar and finds Keith tied up in the basement. Eric stabs Woody.
5	5	"Keith"	Daniel Grou	Russ Cochrane	February 22, 2017	N/A
Cardinal is being blackmailed by a woman regarding the death of an officer; he pays her money and asks her to never return. Delorme tells Josh that they must delay having a child because of her new job. Kelly visits Algonquin Bay; she visits Catherine but she is missing from her room. Woody's body and one of Keith's fingers are found by a hunter in the woods. Delorme recognizes Woody as the break-in suspect. Cardinal and Delorme question Woody's wife, leading them to Eric, an employee at a music store. They search Eric's apartment; meanwhile Eric asks Edie to bring Keith's body to him. Cardinal tries to capture Eric at a school building, but Eric dies during the chase. Delorme finds a hotel receipt at Cardinal's house. Edie stabs Keith with a knife after learning about Eric's death.
6	6	"Catherine"	Daniel Grou	Aubrey Nealon	March 1, 2017	1.04
The police still are unable to locate Keith. Delorme visits the hotel and asks for the guest list, leading her to Tamara Lidstrom, ex-girlfriend of Delroy Moss, Cardinal's inside guy in Toronto. Delorme informs Cardinal that he is being investigated for corruption and confronts him about the blackmail. He confesses that he did it for the money. Cardinal wonders if he and Delorme are still missing a piece of the puzzle. Drugs found in Eric's van lead Cardinal to Edie; meanwhile Edie stalks Cardinal's house. Delorme questions Tamara. Cardinal searches Edie's house and finds Edie's grandmother dead in the basement; he finds Keith still alive in the garage. Edie visits Kelly at the house and takes her hostage. When Cardinal returns home, he is shot by Edie but Kelly manages to escape. Delorme arrives and shoots Edie before she is able to kill Cardinal. Delorme tells Cardinal that she figured out that it was Catherine, who, in her delusional state, mistakenly blew Cardinal's cover, which led to the death of an officer. Delorme files her report on Cardinal and refuses to further carry on the unauthorized investigation of him. She returns home to find Josh gone, and a farewell note on the bed. Meanwhile, Catherine returns home from the hospital to live with Cardinal.

=== Season 2: Blackfly Season (2018) ===
No. overall	No. in season	Title	Directed by	Written by	Original release date	Canadian viewers (millions)
7	1	"Red"	Jeff Renfroe	Sarah Dodd	January 4, 2018	1.08
Six months after the events of the first season, Detective Commanda finds a confused young woman (Alex Paxton-Beesley), alone at a roadside bar. The red-haired woman has no memory of who she is or how she got there. Commanda, who calls the woman "Red," turns the case over to Cardinal and Delorme. The woman had been shot; the bullet still is lodged in her head, causing the loss of memory. Cardinal has her transported to Toronto, where the bullet is successfully removed. Delorme bonds with Rachel (Nicolette Pearse), a former member of a biker gang, at the boxing gym. Delorme questions a trucker who gave a lift to Red and dropped her off at the bar. The bullet's forensics lead the police to Dave, owner of a marina. Upon questioning Dave's employee Marci, they learn that Dave hasn't been to work for about two weeks. Delorme applies for training with the National Intelligence Service (NIS). Musgrave retaliates against her for not helping in the investigation against Cardinal, by implying he has connections to NIS recruiters. Catherine decides to teach a photography class in Toronto. A picture of Beaufort Hill, a trail area in the region, triggers responses in Red, leading Delorme and Cardinal to hike the trails in that area. Cardinal finds a body in a cave posed in a ritualistic manner.
8	2	"Wombat"	Jeff Renfroe	Jennica Harper	January 11, 2018	1.12
The body with the head, limbs, and genitalia removed is identified as that of marina owner Dave. Wombat, a member of the biker gang Northern Raiders, comes in search of Dave and threatens Marci, Dave's employee. Delorme investigates Dave's financial records, and finds that Dave was laundering money for the Northern Raiders. Delorme learns she has been rejected by the National Intelligence Service, possibly due to Musgrave's intervention. A local gang leader, Ray (Bruce Ramsay), his lieutenant Leon (Dan Petronijevic), and two new recruits, Toof (Brock Morgan) and Kevin,(Jonathan Keltz) assault and kidnap Wombat from his home and steal the biker's money to buy drugs from another gang. Leon lies to Ray that Red is dead and says he buried her himself, as he clandestinely starts searching for her. Red starts having memory flashes of her trip to the Bay with Kevin. Delorme and Cardinal raid Wombat's house and find blood. They manage to keep Rachel and her boyfriend from fleeing the scene. Upon questioning, Rachel reveals that she has turned informant for Det. Sgt. Alan Clegg (Kevin Hanchard). That night, Kevin hears Ray torturing Wormbat. Cardinal visits an unknown woman at her house.
9	3	"Kevin"	Jeff Renfroe	Alison Lea Bingeman	January 18, 2018	0.99
Kevin is worried about Wombat's torture, while Ray performs sacrificial rituals. Ray catches Leon's lies about Red and orders him to bring her back alive. Catherine moves to Toronto. Delorme identifies Red as Terri Tait, a college student from Vancouver. Kevin asks Leon about Terri's whereabouts; meanwhile, Terri escapes from the hospital and searches for Kevin. The police start searching for Terri, but to no avail. Musgrave gets a tip about Cardinal and meets with Tammy Lindstrom, who wants to negotiate a deal in exchange for what she knows about Cardinal. Cardinal searches the local school registry and finds that Terri attended high school there and moved to Vancouver after her parents died in a car crash, leaving behind her brother, Kevin. The search for Terri and Kevin leads Cardinal and Delorme to the apartment of a Raider member, Gordie, where they find Wombat's severed head hanging in a shower. Cardinal finds Terri at her parents' old apartment.
10	4	"Toof"	Jeff Renfroe	Jennica Harper	January 25, 2018	N/A
Cardinal questions Terri, who remembers that after she arrived back in town she had an argument with Kevin when she realised that he was dealing drugs again. She recalls running from a black truck (that she saw in her memory flash). Delorme questions Gordie, who informs her that a new player is trying to take over the Northern Raiders. Laselle, the leader of the Northern Raiders, orders his men to find a certain "Northwind," who is taking out the Raiders. Meanwhile, Cardinal transfers Terri to a safe house. The next day, Cardinal and Delorme bring Terri to a cave to help trigger her memory; she remembers Leon leaving her at the cave. Cardinal meets with an expert who explains that the rituals and sacrifices seem to be inspired by an Afro-Caribbean spiritual practice called Palo Mayombe and that more sacrifices may follow — possibly on a new moon night. Musgrave makes Delorme believe that it was she who tipped him off about Tammy. Rachel overdoses on heroin and is admitted to the hospital. After overhearing Toof bragging about the end of the Raiders' hold on the town, Leon takes Kevin and Toof on a drive, where he kills Toof.
11	5	"Northwind"	Jeff Renfroe	Alison Lea Bingeman	February 1, 2018	0.93
The police find a badly battered Toof in the woods. Det. Alan Clegg is revealed to be working with Ray, who informs him that the police are looking for Leon. Ray asks him to find Terri. Toof's mother tells Cardinal that Toof was living with two guys named Leon and Northwind. Commanda finds out that Northwind's first name is Ray. Musgrave meets Tammy to get the information on Cardinal, but she already has informed Cardinal about it. Cardinal intimidates Musgrave, asking him to back off from Delorme, who gets accepted into the NIS. Tammy visits Cardinal's house to return the money, but instead finds Catherine there. She unknowingly informs Catherine about her phone call that led to the death of an officer. Kevin runs away from the camp in Leon's truck and crashes off the road after getting high; he survives and returns to the camp. Terri identifies Leon from a photograph as the man who dumped her at the cave. The police find Leon's crashed truck and trace the owner as Ray. Kevin enters Ray's ritual room and is stabbed by Ray; Terri is kidnapped from the safe house.
12	6	"El Brujo"	Jeff Renfroe	Sarah Dodd	February 8, 2018	N/A
Camera footage from the safe house shows the presence of Leon at the scene. Cardinal suspects that an inside man leaked Terri's location. Clegg informs Ray about Cardinal. Delorme and Cardinal question Ray's social worker, who reveals that Ray was sensitive about his mother, who was associated with biker gangs. Ray prepares Kevin and Terri for his ritual, as Clegg reveals Ray's location to Lasalle. Cardinal gets a lead about Ray's location and starts his search with Clegg. On their way to the location, Clegg destroys Cardinal's phone and takes him to Ray's camp at gunpoint. Police realize that Clegg is working with Ray and start tracing him. Together, Cardinal, Delorme, and Commanda manage to overpower Ray and free Kevin and Terri. The bikers show up at the scene and are arrested by the police; Ray also is arrested. Cardinal reaches home and finds Catherine missing. Upon arriving at a crime scene, he finds Catherine dead, lying on the pavement.

=== Season 3: By the Time You Read This (2019) ===
No. overall	No. in season	Title	Directed by	Written by	Original release date	Canadian viewers (millions)
13	1	"Sam"	Daniel Grou	Patrick Tarr	January 24, 2019	N/A
Police find a suicide note in Catherine's possession and conclude that she jumped from the building, killing herself. Delorme decides against the NIS training and plans to stay. Dyson's sister dies after long illness. Cardinal starts receiving anonymous letters blaming him for Catherine's death. A young girl, Sam (Devery Jacobs), meets and sleeps with her lover, Randall (Aaron Ashmore), a Realtor, at a remote for-sale island cottage. After Randall leaves, Sam witness a dual murder at the house but manages to escape the killer — albeit injuring herself and leaving behind her cell phone. She informs Randall about the incident and wants to go to the police but Randall, who is married, asks her to lie low. The police arrive at the scene but the bodies of the victims are missing; they also find the evidence of a presence of a survivor. Delorme and Cardinal deal with a prolific ATM robber who is causing carnage across town. Delorme and Cardinal question Randall, who names his friend Troy as an alibi. The bodies are found drowned in the lake along with a boat. The killer gets ahold of Sam's phone. Meanwhile, Cardinal sets out to prove that his wife did not commit suicide.
14	2	"Roman & Irena"	Daniel Grou	Noelle Carbone	January 31, 2019	1.02
Dyson is now taking care of her dead sister's daughter. She witnesses a young boy, Perry, take his life before her eyes; she starts struggling after the incident. The police identify the couple as Roman and Irena Barstow, a wealthy couple visiting from New York, who are involved in a gun manufacturing company. Sam continues to find herself under the killer's watchful eye; he follows her to her house. Randall's wife, Laura, decides to run for election. Sam panics after learning about the murders on TV and receives a call from the killer; she leaves a message for Delorme. A woman referred to as Mama (Rya Kihlstedt) and a group of young kids, including the killer, take an old man hostage at his lake house.
15	3	"Jack"	Daniel Grou	Patrick Tarr	February 7, 2019	0.87
The old man, Lloyd is locked up in the bathroom; meanwhile Mama whips the killer, Jack, for killing the Barstows without getting the guns from them. Nikki and Lemur, other kids in the group, set up traps at the property. Kelly returns home for Thanksgiving. Cardinal looks into a number of unsolved cold cases in an attempt to identify a connection. Cardinal and Delorme suspect that Randall was sleeping with someone at the house. They question Randall but he denies any wrongdoing. Jack searches for the guns at a storage facility, leading to confrontation with a security guard. Troy stalks and chases Sam and she attacks him in return. Sam approaches the police believing the killer attacked her. Troy confesses to the police that Randall asked him to intimidate her. Mama tortures Lloyd. Cardinal continues his investigation to identify the sender of the mysterious cards. Dyson confronts him after he intimidates a parolee while unofficially investigating Catherine's death. The police arrest Randall for questioning.
16	4	"Lemur"	Daniel Grou	Shannon Masters	February 14, 2019	N/A
Sam draws a picture of Jack for the police. She moves to Commanda's house for protection. Nikki rejects Lemur's advances, saying that they are family; Jack picks a fight with Lemur and Nikki and threatens them. The police find the Barstow's rental car with hidden money and weapons. Cardinal suspects that the Barstows were gunrunners. Cardinal questions Michel, a gun buyer, who was last seen with the Barstows. He tells them that the Barstows brought a lot of guns to sell. Jack continues stalking Sam and follows her to Jerry's house. Cardinal traces down the person sending him the anonymous cards; while Dyson asks everyone to stop investigating Catherine's death. Delorme chases Lemur after he crashes his car following a robbery. Lemur manages to hide from the police and calls Jack for help but is killed by Jack. The police find Roman's wallet in the car, connecting the ATM robberies with the double murder. The car stolen from the airport leads them to video footage of Mama and Lemur stealing the car; Lloyd frees himself but is recaptured by Mama.
17	5	"Mama"	Daniel Grou	Aaron Bala, Noelle Carbone, Patrick Tarr	February 21, 2019	N/A
Both Cardinal and Kelly struggle following Catherine's death. Jack lies to Mama that the police killed Lemur. Cardinal gets a message on Catherine's computer from one of her friends, who was aware of her problems; he arranges a meeting with her in Toronto. Cardinal and Delorme head to Toronto, where Cardinal speaks with Catherine's friend, who was a former patient of Catherine's psychologist, Dr. Bell. She discloses to Cardinal that Bell made her write a suicide note. Delorme finds out that Mama's real name is Sharlene Winston, who served five years in the military and was discharged because she suffered from complex apocalyptic delusions. Jack breaks into Jerry's home but manages to escape after Jerry shows up. Cardinal confronts Bell; Bell asks his wife, Helen, to stay away from Cardinal. Cardinal suspects Bell in Catherine's death and connects it with other suicides of Bell's patients. Jack is able to retrieve the weapons. Police locate one of Sharlene's old hideouts, Scriver House, an abandoned house where all members of the Scriver family were slain and their bodies never found.
18	6	"Helen"	Daniel Grou	Patrick Tarr	March 6, 2019	N/A
The police identify Sharlene as Amy Scriver, who was presumed dead at the age of 17. Delorme suspects that Amy killed her parents, drowned their bodies in the lake, and assumed another identity. Bell's wife gives Doctor Bell's hard drive with recordings of sessions, where he provoked clients, including Perry into suicide. Catherine was dissatisfied with Bell's methods and told him that she would warn other patients about him. Cardinal shows the recordings to Delorme and Dyson, who reopens Catherine's case. Cardinal notices that Catherine's digital camera was missing from the scene; they find a memory card in the evidence box. Sharlene fortifies the house with weapons, unable to escape the lake as police search and find the bodies of the Scrivers. Sharlene traps Delorme and Cardinal and takes them hostage. Jack traps Commanda while Sharlene shoots Nikki after she refuses her orders. After a scuffle, Cardinal shoots Sharlene dead, and Commanda shoots Jack. Bell is brought in for questioning. Photos recovered from Catherine's card confirm Bell's presence at the crime scene and he is arrested. Cardinal removes some of Catherine's things from the house. He and Delorme have dinner at his house, while they watch police footage and take notes.

=== Season 4: Until the Night (2020) ===
No. overall	No. in season	Title	Directed by	Written by	Original release date	Canadian viewers (millions)
19	1	"Robert"	Nathan Morlando	Patrick Tarr	April 6, 2020	1.037
Cardinal moves to an apartment; Delorme gets a job offer in Toronto. Sheila Gagne (Carmen Moore), a local politician, reports that her husband, Robert, a prosecutor, is missing. Sheila informs the police that they had an open marriage and Robert went on a date but didn't return home. Police search Robert's hotel room, recovering his clothing and possessions, along with a feather. Cardinal and Delorme question Robert's date, Holly Francis. Police arrest Wade, a parolee, who tried to extort money from Sheila in return for information on Robert's abduction. While transporting Wade to the station Det. Ash is attacked by the abductor who kills Wade. Sheila gets a call from the abductor asking her to prove her love for Robert. Sheila holds a press conference asking the abductor to talk. She later gets a video of Robert being left exposed in the cold. The police find Robert's body tied to a log, frozen to death in a logging area; meanwhile the killer stalks another man.
20	2	"Adele"	Nathan Morlando	Sarah Dodd	April 13, 2020	N/A
Delorme and Cardinal go to Toronto for Robert's autopsy; they also meet Kelly there. The killer stalks Barry, owner of a nursery, who lives with his mother, Adele. Delorme informs Dyson about her plan to move to Toronto after the case. Delorme encounters her ex boyfriend, Josh, now happily married with a child. Delorme and Cardinal attend Robert's memorial hoping that the killer might show up. One of the guests, Taj Roy, attracts Cardinal's attention. The killer, Neil, abducts Adele, leaving behind a feather at the scene. The killer takes Adele to a car scrapyard, forces her to record a video message for Barry and leaves her there tied to a car.
21	3	"Barry"	Nathan Morlando	Penny E. Gummerson	April 20, 2020	0.908
The police find Adele's body frozen to death at the scrapyard. Neil is visited by a man, Scott who has apparently hired Neil for carrying out the kills in vengeance of a past deed involving Barry and Sheila. Barry and Sheila meet at the church meanwhile Neil prepares for the next kill. Taj visits and intimidates Barry; he is later found dead in the backyard of his house frozen to death. Cardinal learns about Barry's meeting with Sheila from the priest of the church; Lise finds out that both Barry and Sheila worked for a company called Watershed Forestry. Cardinal and Lise question Sheila who they suspect is holding information back. Neil abducts Josh; Josh's father Ken shows up at the scene but is overpowered by Neil.
22	4	"Neil"	Nathan Morlando	Patrick Tarr & Jordi Mand	April 27, 2020	1.089
Josh and Ken are found missing; police find that the killer was captured in a baby cam in Josh's house; the killer is identified as Neil Cuthbert, a professional contact killer. Commanda makes a connection between Ken and Sheila. Taj contacts Sheil. Neil leaves Josh at a quarry to die. Neil wants Scott to kill Ken but Scott wants to take Ken to the quarry; after a disagreement and a scuffle, Scott kills Neil. A neighbour witnesses it and manages to escape. The police find Neil's body but Ken is still missing. Josh manages to free himself and sets fire to a shed; Police rescue him. The police secure a warrant on Sheila; she escapes with one of Taj's men.
23	5	"Scott"	Nathan Morlando	Sarah Dodd	May 4, 2020	1.018
Taj moves his daughter and Sheila to his trucking facility. Cardinal and Lise question one of Ken's employees who revealed that Ken paid Shelia and Barry to leak future logging prospects using their Watershed access. In a flashback, Scott and his girlfriend are seen attacked by a hunting party while they are camping in the forest. The police are able to locate Ken's body. The police look for old cases related to the forest area; they find that a young girl, Rebecca was raped and killed there 20 years ago; Scott Riley was convicted for it. The police raid Scott's house in Toronto finding a connection to the killings. The police look at Scott's police interview and conclude that the arresting officer was prejudiced against Scott and convicted him of murder that was actually committed by Ken, Taj, Barry and Sheila. Scott enters Taj's trucking facility and abducts Taj and his daughter. Commanda arrests Sheila.
24	6	"John & Lise"	Nathan Morlando	Patrick Tarr	May 11, 2020	1.162
Lise and Cardinal question Sheila. Scott takes Taj and his daughter to the forest and ties them to trees; meanwhile the police search the forest area. Scott shoots at Lise and Cardinal after they get close to the site. Cardinal tries to talk to Scott to make him surrender but he shoots Cardinal and Lise. Commanda shoots and kills Scott and the police are able to save Taj and his daughter. Lise moves to Toronto while Cardinal is called to another crime scene.

== Production ==
The first season was directed by Daniel Grou, and produced by Sienna Films and eOne Entertainment. It commenced production in Sudbury, Ontario in February 2016, with some additional location filming taking place in North Bay, Nipissing First Nation and Atikameksheng Anishnawbek. The first season was given a production budget of $1,800,000 per episode. Locations included the former studios of CBC Northern Ontario and the North Bay Public Library, which served as the Algonquin Bay police station.

The second season was directed by Jeff Renfroe, and was produced primarily in North Bay.

The show's theme music is adapted from the song "Familiar" by Danish singer-songwriter Agnes Obel. Background music featured in the series is composed by Toronto-based Todor Kobakov.

Vanasse, who is Québécoise and had previously appeared in the American television series Pan Am and Revenge, commented that Cardinal is the first time in which she is playing a Québécoise rather than a European character in an English-language television programme.

== International transmission ==
Episodes from the second season premiered a day in advance of their television broadcast on on-demand service Crave TV. Filming on the third season completed in July 2018, and the season began airing on January 24, 2019. The fourth and final season was broadcast in 2020 with its finale airing on May 11, 2020.

In the United Kingdom the series was broadcast on BBC Four for the first three seasons and BBC Two for the last season. It was broadcast on C More in Scandinavia, Calle 13 in Spain, Hulu in the United States, SBS in Australia (no longer broadcast), Magenta TV in Germany, Canvas in Belgium and Channel 11 in Israel. In Brazil, the TV series premiered on Universal+, streaming belonged to Universal TV, NBCUniversal's channel.

== Reception ==
John Doyle of The Globe and Mail praised the series, calling it "a gripping, superbly made crime drama" which ultimately lands as "landmark Canadian TV".

The series received 12 Canadian Screen Award nominations at the 6th Canadian Screen Awards in 2018. It won six awards, including Best Actor in a Limited Program or Television Film (Campbell), Best Supporting Actress in a Drama Program (Macdonald), Photography in a Drama Series (Steve Cosens), Editing in a Drama Series (Teresa De Luca), Music in a Fiction Program or Series (Todor Kobakov) and Best Casting (Jon Comerford and Lisa Parasyn).

At the 7th Canadian Screen Awards in 2019, the series won the awards for Best Limited Series, Best Lead Actor in a Drama Program or Limited Series (Campbell), Best Lead Actress in a Drama Program or Limited Series (Vanasse), Best Editing in a Dramatic Program or Series (Matthew Anas), Best Direction in a Dramatic Program or Mini-series (Renfroe), Best Music in a Fiction Production (Kobakov) and Best Writing in a Dramatic Program or Mini-series (Sarah Dodd for the episode "Red").
