= Too Close to Home (novel) =

Novel written by Linwood Barclay

- Book cover
- Author: Linwood Barclay
- Cover artist: Getty Images & Alamy
- Language: English
- Genre: Thriller
- Publisher: Orion Publishing Group
- Publication date: September 30, 2008
- Publication place: Canada
- Pages: 466
- ISBN: 978-1-4091-0209-0

Too Close to Home is a novel written by Canadian author Linwood Barclay, the author of the Richard & Judy Summer read winner "No Time For Goodbye".

In 2009, it won the Crime Writers of Canada Award for Best Novel.

== Summary ==
When the Cutter family's next-door-neighbours, the Langleys, are gunned down in their house one hot July night, the Cutters' world is turned upside down. Could the killers have gone to the wrong house? At first the idea seems crazy, but gradually we discover that each of the Cutter family has a secret they'd rather keep buried.
