= Giles Blunt =

Canadian novelist, poet, and screenwriter

- Born: 1952 (age 73–74); Windsor, Ontario, Canada
- Education: University of Toronto
- Occupation: Author
- Writing career
- Years active: 1987–present
- Genre: Mystery fiction
- Notable work: John Cardinal series
- Notable awards: Silver Dagger Award (2001); Arthur Ellis Award for Best Novel (2004, 2013)

Giles Blunt (born 1952) is a Canadian novelist, poet, and screenwriter. His first novel, Cold Eye, was a psychological thriller set in the New York art world, which was made into the French movie Les Couleurs du diable (Allain Jessua, 1997).

== Career ==
Blunt is also the author of the John Cardinal novels, set in the small city of Algonquin Bay, in Northern Ontario. Blunt was born in Windsor, Ontario, and grew up in North Bay; Algonquin Bay is North Bay thinly disguised — for example, Blunt retains the names of major streets and the two lakes (Trout Lake and Lake Nipissing) that the town sits between, the physical layout of the two places is the same, and he describes Algonquin Bay as being in the same geographical location as North Bay. He studied English literature at the Mississauga campus of the University of Toronto.

The first Cardinal story, Forty Words for Sorrow, won the British Crime Writers' Association Silver Dagger, and the second, The Delicate Storm, won the Crime Writers of Canada's Arthur Ellis Award for best novel, as did the sixth, Until the Night. The 2010 John Cardinal novel Crime Machine was described as "a richly plotted work by one of Canada's best mystery novelists."

Blunt also has written No Such Creature, a "road novel" set in the American southwest, and Breaking Lorca, which is set in a clandestine jail in El Salvador in the 1980s. Twice nominated for the International Dublin Literary Award, his novels have been compared to the work of Ian Rankin and Cormac McCarthy.

Giles Blunt on Bookbits radio.

Blunt's television credits include episodes of Law & Order, Street Legal, and Night Heat plus four seasons of Cardinal, a series adapted from his novels.

== Awards and honours ==
Blunt received the honorary degree of Doctor of Education on June 12, 2014, from Nipissing University.

Awards for Blunt's writing
Year	Title	Award	Category	Result	Ref.
2001	Forty Words for Sorrow	Arthur Ellis Award	Novel	Finalist	
2001	Forty Words for Sorrow	Silver Dagger	—	Won	
2003	The Delicate Storm	Hammett Prize	—	Finalist	
2004	The Delicate Storm	Anthony Awards	Novel	Finalist	
2004	The Delicate Storm	Arthur Ellis Award	Novel	Won	
2004	The Delicate Storm	Macavity Awards	Novel	Finalist	
2006	Black Fly Season	Arthur Ellis Award	Novel	Finalist	
2007	By the Time You Read This	Gold Dagger	—	Finalist	
2013	Until the Night	Arthur Ellis Award	Novel	Won	

== Published works ==
=== John Cardinal series ===
- —— (2000). Forty Words for Sorrow. Random House Canada. ISBN 9780425185162.
- —— (2002). The Delicate Storm. Random House Canada. ISBN 9780425196786.
- —— (2005). Black Fly Season. Random House Canada. ISBN 9780425209578.
- —— (2006). By the Time You Read This. Random House Canada. ISBN 9780679312444.
- —— (2010). Crime Machine. Random House Canada. ISBN 9780679314332.
- —— (2012). Until the Night. Random House Canada. ISBN 9780679314356.

=== Other books ===
- —— (1989). Cold Eye (paperback 1st ed.). Avon Books. ISBN 9780380708765.
- —— (2008). No Such Creature. Random House Canada. ISBN 9780679314318.
- —— (2009). Breaking Lorca. Random House Canada. ISBN 9780307357007.
- —— (2015). The Hesitation Cut. Random House Canada. ISBN 9780345815972.
- —— (2016). Vanishing Act. Exile Editions. ISBN 9781550965834.
- —— (2025). Bad Juliet. Dundurn Press. ISBN 9781459755727.

== Screenwriting credits ==
Year	Title	Notes
1987	Night Heat	Episode: The Cost of Doing Business
1987-89	Diamonds	Episodes: The Smiling Mortician and Dinosaur
1991	Law & Order	Episode: His Hour Upon the Stage
1993	Street Legal	Episode: Thicker Than Water

=== Other ===
Year	Title	Notes
2011	Republic of Doyle	Script consultant, 2 episodes
