= Nicole Lundrigan =

Canadian writer

- Relatives: John Lundrigan (father)
- Writing career
- Genres: Thriller; crime fiction
- Website: nicolelundrigan.com

Nicole Lundrigan is a Canadian thriller writer. She has been nominated for the Crime Writers of Canada Award for Best Novel twice.

== Life ==
Nicole Lundrigan was born to parents Nancy and John Lundrigan in Ottawa, Ontario. Her family moved back to Newfoundland when she was two and she grew up in Upper Gullies. She attended Queen Elizabeth Regional High School in Foxtrap, Newfoundland and received a BSc from the University of New Brunswick as well as a BA in anthropology from Saint Mary's University. She then moved to Ontario in 1996 to complete an MSc from the University of Toronto. She gave birth to a daughter after finishing her master's and decided not to pursue a PhD.

== Books ==
- Unraveling Arva (Jesperson, 2003)
- Thaw (Jesperson, 2005)
- The Seary Line (2008)
- Glass Boys (2011)
- The Widow Tree (2013)
- The Substitute (2017)
- Hideaway (2019)
- An Unthinkable Thing (2022)
- A Man Downstairs (2024)

== Awards and nominations ==
Year	Work	Award	Category	Result	Ref.
2006	Thaw	ReLit Awards	Novel	Longlisted	
2009	The Seary Line	ReLit Awards	Novel	Longlisted	
2009	The Seary Line	Sunburst Award	Adult	Recommended	
2012	Glass Boys	ReLit Awards	Novel	Longlisted	
2020	Hideaway	Crime Writers of Canada Awards	Novel	Shortlisted	
2023	An Unthinkable Thing	Crime Writers of Canada Awards	Novel	Shortlisted	
