= William Deverell =

Canadian novelist, activist, and criminal lawyer

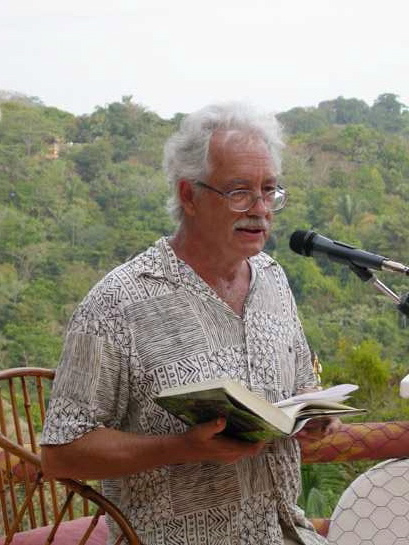
- William Deverell reading in Manuel Antonio, Costa Rica, to raise funds for a library.
- Born: William Herbert Deverell; March 4, 1937 (age 89); Regina, Saskatchewan, Canada
- Education: University of Saskatchewan
- Occupation: Writer
- Writing career
- Genres: Courtroom drama Crime fiction Humour
- Website: www.deverell.com

William Deverell talks about Snow Job on Bookbits radio.

William Herbert Deverell (born March 4, 1937) is a Canadian writer, criminal lawyer, and civil liberties activist. One of Canada's best-known novelists, his debut novel Needles, based on his legal experience, won the $50,000 Seal First Novel Award from McClelland & Stewart. He received the Hammett Prize in 1998 for Trial of Passion, which also won the 1998 Arthur Ellis Award for Best Novel; April Fool won the same award in 2003. Trial of Passion launched his long-running crime series about Arthur Beauchamp, a classically trained, self-doubting barrister who solves crimes in releases such as April Fool, Kill All the Judges, Snow Job, I'll See You in My Dreams, Sing a Worried Song, Whipped, and Stung.

== Career ==
Early in his career, Deverell worked as a journalist with the Canadian Press in Montreal and the Vancouver Sun, and while working his way through law school at the University of Saskatchewan as night editor of the Saskatoon Star-Phoenix. He hold a D. Juris from that university, where he has been an invited lecturer in the Shumiatcher series on Law and Literature and was honoured at its College of Arts and Sciences' centenary in 2009 as one of its 100 alumni of influence. In October 2011, he was awarded an honorary Doctor of Letters from Simon Fraser University, and five years later he received a D. Litt from the University of Saskatchewan, which holds his archives. Among his learned lectures have been Obscenity, Hate, and Artistic Freedom at the Vancouver Institute, and A Writer's Life in the Writers' Trust of Canada Margaret Laurence series.

In over twenty years as a Vancouver lawyer, he was counsel in more than a thousand trials, including civil rights, labour, and criminal cases and thirty murder trials, either as defender or prosecutor. He is a founder and honorary director of the British Columbia Civil Liberties Association. In 1991–92, he served as visiting professor in the Creative Writing Department at the University of Victoria. In 1994, he served as chair of the Writers' Union of Canada, and again in 1999, and has been named a Life Member of that Union. He is also a life member of the Writers Guild of Canada, and a member of PEN International and Crime Writers of Canada. An environmental activist, he is also a member of Greenpeace, Ecojustice Canada, and the Green Party of Canada.

== Writing work ==
Deverell's nineteen published novels also include High Crimes, Mecca, The Dance of Shiva, Platinum Blues, Mindfield, Kill All the Lawyers, Street Legal, Slander, The Laughing Falcon, and Mind Games. He is the author of the true crime book Fatal Cruise, based on a notorious murder trial which he defended.

He has achieved recognition for suffusing his novels with satire. Both Kill All the Judges and Snow Job were shortlisted for Canada's Stephen Leacock Medal. Snow Job, a political satire, was named in The Globe and Mail as one of the top crime books worldwide in 2009. He has twice been invited as guest of honour at Canada's main crime writers' venue, Bloody Words, and received the Best Canadian Crime Writer award at the Scene of the Crime Festival in Ontario.

Deverell's film work includes the screenplay for the feature film of Mindfield, released in 1990. He also wrote the screenplay Shellgame for CBC Television, which served as the pilot for CBC's Street Legal, the longest-running one-hour scripted drama in the history of Canadian television until its 20-year record was surpassed by Heartland's 139th season in 2015. He has authored several one-hour radio plays performed by the CBC Radio in the Scales of Justice series and numerous film and television scripts.

== Personal life ==
He lives on Pender Island, British Columbia.

== Published works ==
=== Standalone novels ===
- Needles (1979)
- High Crimes (1981)
- Mecca (1983)
- The Dance of Shiva (1984)
- Mindfield (1989)
- Platinum Blues (1989)
- Kill All the Lawyers (1991)
- Street Legal (1995)
- Slander (1999)
- The Laughing Falcon (2001)
- Mind Games (2003)

=== Arthur Beauchamp series ===
1. Trial of Passion (1997)
2. April Fool (2005)
3. Kill All the Judges (2008)
4. Snow Job (2009)
5. I'll See You in My Dreams (2011)
6. Sing a Worried Song (2015)
7. Whipped (2017)
8. Stung (2021)

=== Nonfiction ===
- Fatal Cruise: The Case of Robert Frisbee (1991)
