= Robyn Harding =

Canadian crime writer

- Born: c. 1969 (age 56–57)
- Occupations: Writer; novelist; screenwriter
- Writing career
- Language: English
- Years active: 2004–present
- Genres: Crime; comedy
- Website: www.robynharding.com

Robyn Harding (born c. 1969 in Vancouver, British Columbia, Canada) is a Canadian crime writer who has written several bestselling novels. Her notable works include The Drowning Woman, The Perfect Family, The Arrangement, Her Pretty Face, and The Party.

== Personal life ==
Harding is the adopted daughter of Robert and Margaret Harding.

Before being a novelist, she worked as an advertising executive for seven years.

== Career ==
Harding published her first novel, The Journal of Mortifying Moments, in 2004. In an interview, Harding stated: "Over the years I'd attempted to write deep, literary novels but I never got very far and they were never very good. When I decided to try my hand at humor and came up with the concept for The Journal of Mortifying Moments, it flowed much more smoothly."

She was nominated for the 2018 Arthur Ellis Awards for Best Novel for The Party; however, this book lost to Peter Robinson's Sleeping in the Ground.

She wrote the screenplay for the comedy film The Steps.

== Bibliography ==
- The Journal of Mortifying Moments (2004)
- The Secret Desires of a Soccer Mom (2006)
- Unravelled (2007)
- Chronicles of a Midlife Crisis (2008)
- My Parents Are Sex Maniacs (2009)
- Mom, Will This Chicken Give Me Man Boobs? (2009)
- The Party (2017)
- Her Pretty Face (2018)
- The Arrangement (2019)
- The Swap (2020)
- The Perfect Family (2021)
- The Drowning Woman (2023)
- The Haters (2024)
- Strangers in the Villa (2026)
