= Barbara Fradkin =

Canadian writer

Barbara Fradkin, née Currie, is a Canadian mystery writer, and a two-time winner of the Arthur Ellis Award for Best Novel.

== Biography ==
Fradkin was born in Montreal and obtained her B.A. at McGill University and M.A. at the University of Toronto, before moving to Ottawa to work and raise a family. A few years later she obtained her PhD in clinical psychology from the University of Ottawa, and has recently scaled back her full-time practice as a child psychologist in order to devote more time to her writing.

She is an active member of Canada's writing community, she is the past president of Crime Writers of Canada as well as contributes to Sisters in Crime and Capital Crime Writers, an Ottawa mystery writers' group.

Her own experience as a graduate student as well as that of her daughter, supplied the backdrop and detail for Do or Die. Her late husband's experiences in war crimes prosecutions gave her the impetus and background for Once Upon a Time, while Mist Walker and Fifth Son draw on her own experiences as a psychologist.

Fradkin is perhaps best known for her Inspector Green series, a police procedural series set in Ottawa. The main character is "the impetuous, exasperating Ottawa Police Inspector Michael Green, whose passion for justice and love of the hunt often conflicts with family, friends and police protocol." There are currently eleven novels in the series.

== Awards ==
=== Win ===
- Storyteller Magazine's Great Canadian Short Story Contest, 1998, for "Brandemoor"
- Storyteller Magazine's Great Canadian Short Story Contest, 2002, for "Timber Town Justice"
- 2005 Arthur Ellis Award for Best Novel for Fifth Son
- 2007 Arthur Ellis Award for Best Novel for Honour Among Men

=== Nominations ===
- Arthur Ellis Award for Best Short Story, 2002, for "Coup de Grace"
- Arthur Ellis Award for Best Short Story, 2002, for "Double Trouble"
- Arthur Ellis Award for Best Novel, 2003, for Once Upon a Time
- Arthur Ellis Award for Best Short Story, 2003, for " Timber Town Justice"
- Arthur Ellis Award for Best Novella, 2013, for Evil Behind That Door
- Arthur Ellis Award for Best Novel, 2015, for None So Blind
- Arthur Ellis Award for Best Novella, 2016, for The Night Thief
- Arthur Ellis Award for Best Novella, 2020, for Blood Ties

== Bibliography ==
=== Short stories ===
- "Baby Blues" in Hard-boiled Love, edited by P. Sellers and K. Schooley. Toronto: Insomniac Press, 2003
- "The Minstrel Boy" in Bone Dance, edited by S. Pike and J. Boswell. Toronto: RendezVous Press, 2003
- "Major Billingham's Wife" in Storyteller Magazine, Fall 2003
- "Spoils of War" in When Boomers Go Bad. Toronto: RendezVous Press, 2005
- "Voices from the Deep" in Dead in the Water, edited by Therese Greenwood and Violette Malan. Toronto: RendezVous Press, 2006

=== Novels in the Inspector Green series ===
- Do or Die. Toronto: RendezVous Press, 2000.
- Once Upon a Time. Toronto: RendezVous Press, 2002.
- Mist Walker. Toronto: RendezVous Press, 2003.
- Fifth Son. Toronto: RendezVous Press, 2004.
- Honour Among Men. Toronto: RendezVous Press, 2006.
- Dream Chasers. Toronto: RendezVous Press, 2007.
- This Thing of Darkness. Toronto: Napoleon and Company, RendezVous Crime, 2009.
- Beautiful Lie the Dead. Toronto: Napoleon and Company, RendezVous Crime, 2010.
- The Whisper of Legends. Toronto: Dundurn Press, 2013.
- None so Blind. Toronto: Dundurn Press, 2014.
- The Devil to Pay. Toronto: Dundurn Press, 2021.
- A yet-to-be-named twelfth Inspector Green novel is scheduled to be released in January, 2025.

=== Novels in the Cedric O'Toole (Rapid Reads Imprint) series ===
- The Fall Guy. Victoria: Rapid Reads, Orca Book Publishers, 2011.
- Evil Behind that Door. Victoria: Rapid Reads, Orca Book Publishers, 2012.
- The Night Thief. Victoria: Rapid Reads, Orca Book Publishers, 2015.
- Blood Ties. Victoria: Rapid Reads, Orca Book Publishers 2019.

=== Novels in the Amanda Doucette series ===
- Fire in the Stars. Toronto: Dundurn Press, 2016.
- The Trickster's Lullaby. Toronto: Dundurn Press, 2017.
- Prisoners of Hope. Toronto: Dundurn Press, 2018.
- The Ancient Dead. Toronto: Dundurn Press, 2021.
- Wreck Bay. Toronto: Dundurn Press, 2023.
