= L. R. Wright =

Canadian writer (1939 – 2001)

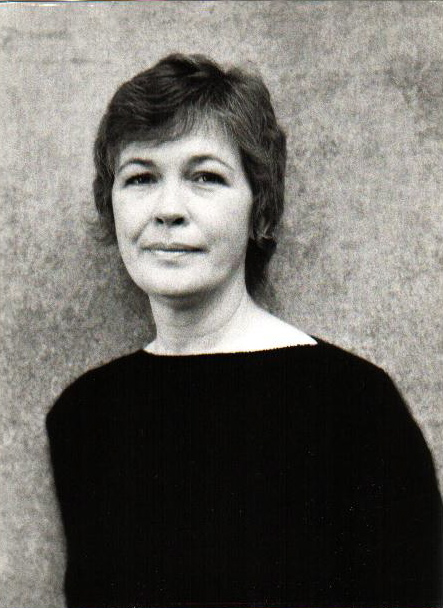
- L.R. Wright in 1982
- Born: Laurali Rose Appleby; 5 June 1939; Saskatoon, Saskatchewan
- Died: February 25, 2001 (aged 61)
- Education: Carleton University; University of Calgary; University of British Columbia; Simon Fraser University
- Occupation: Writer
- Spouse: John Wright
- Children: 2
- Website: www.lrwright.com

Laurali Rose Wright (née Appleby; 5 June 1939 – 25 February 2001), known professionally as L. R. Wright, was a Canadian writer of mainstream fiction and mystery novels. Many of her stories are set on the coast of British Columbia.

== Early life and education ==
Wright was born in Saskatoon, Saskatchewan. She was educated at Carleton University, the University of Calgary, University of British Columbia, and later at Simon Fraser University (Master of Arts in Liberal Studies, 1995).

== Career ==
In 1959, Wright worked as a journalist at the Fraser Valley Record; she wrote for the Saskatoon Star Phoenix, but her first article was for The Globe and Mail about being a teenager in Germany. She later moved to Calgary, where she was mentored by W. O. Mitchell. She worked in California for an advertising agency.

While in Vancouver, she met John Wright. The two married in 1962, and she spent time as an actor with her husband, including a stint doing summer stock in Dawson City. She worked for several years as a journalist at the Calgary Herald, eventually becoming assistant city editor, before turning to full-time fiction writing in 1977.

Wright published her first novel, Neighbours, in 1979. Her earliest novels were literary fiction; after the publication of The Suspect (1985), her first mystery novel and winner of the 1986 Edgar Award for Best Novel, she concentrated almost exclusively on the genre. One further work of literary fiction, Love in the Temperate Zone, appeared in 1988.

In addition to the Edgar Award, Wright received the Arthur Ellis Award and wrote several adaptations of her novels for CBC Radio. Her novels have been published and distributed throughout the world in several languages. The Suspect has been adapted for the stage and, at various times, the Alberg and Cassandra series has been optioned for film and television. It is the basis for the television series Murder in a Small Town, which premiered in 2024.

== Personal life ==
Wright rarely used her given names for any purpose. She published all her novels as L. R. Wright (except in the US, where she appeared as Laurali Wright), and was known as Bunny in her personal life.

She and her husband, John Wright, got first married in 1962 and divorced in 1995; they remarried on December 25, 2000. They had two daughters.

Wright died of breast cancer in Vancouver, British Columbia, on February 25, 2001.

== Published works ==
=== The Alberg and Cassandra Mysteries ===
- The Suspect (1985)
- Sleep While I Sing (1986)
- A Chill Rain in January (1990)
- Fall From Grace (1991)
- Prized Possessions (1993)
- A Touch of Panic (1994)
- Mother Love (1995)
- Strangers Among Us (1996)
- Acts of Murder (1997)

=== The Edwina Henderson Mysteries ===
- Kidnap (2000)
- Menace (2001)

=== Other novels ===
- Neighbours (1979)
- The Favorite (1982)
- Among Friends (1984)
- Love in the Temperate Zone (1988)
