= Roz Nay =

Canadian writer

- Occupations: writer, teacher, social worker
- Known for: Award winning author

Roz Nay is a Canadian writer.

== Personal life ==
Nay and her husband moved to Canada when their two children were young.

== Writing career ==
Our Little Secret, her first novel, started as a short story she wrote when she took a creative writing course, at Selkirk College, in 2012. It was nominated for an Arthur Ellis Award and a Kobo Emerging Writer Award, and it won the Douglas Kennedy Prize for best foreign thriller.

In an interview with the Vancouver Sun Nay said she was a former high school teacher, and her teaching experience was one of the inspirations for Our Little Secret. Following her work as a high school teacher Nay worked in child protection for the British Columbia Ministry of Families. Her work in child protection served as an inspiration for her second novel Hurry Home.

According to the Boundary Creek Times the success of her first book earned Nay a two-book deal. They wrote that Nay expected to publish Hurry Home in 2018, but she found she was still learning how to write thrillers, and it took much longer. The Nelson Daily wrote the novel revolved around "two estranged sisters, who share a dark secret".

The Boundary Creek Times wrote the manuscript for her third novel, set in Africa, was essentially complete. It was inspired by her extensive travel in that continent, in her 20s, and took her just eight months.
