= Shelly Sanders =

Canadian Jewish author and journalist

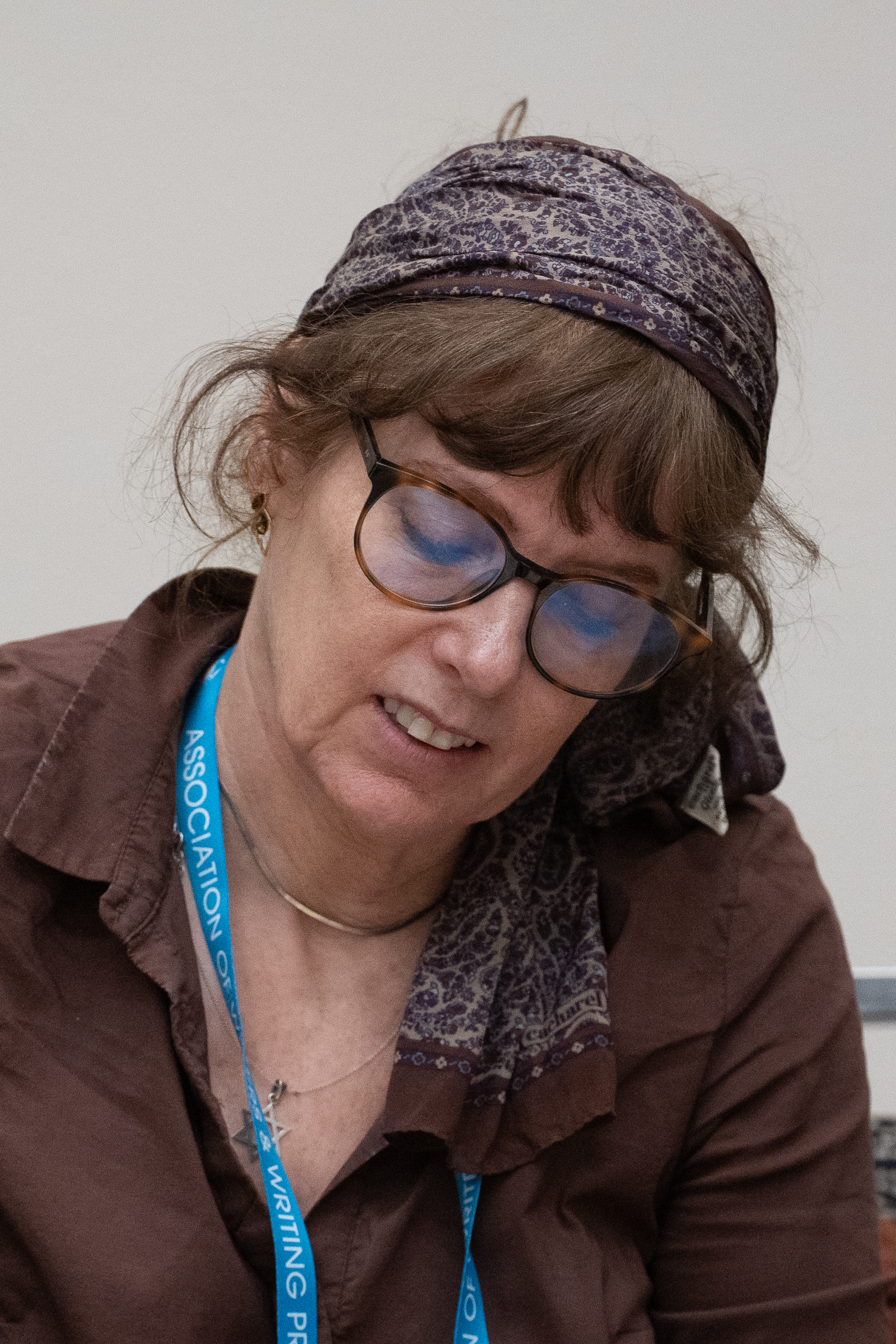
Sanders at AWP 2026

Shelly Sanders (born 17 July 1964) is a Canadian Jewish journalist and novelist writing in English.

== Early life and education ==
Sanders was born Shelly Ann Sanders in Toronto, Ontario. Her father, Richard Eric Sanders, worked in advertising, and her mother, Ann Louise Sanders (née Geary), was a schoolteacher. When Sanders was eight, the family, which included her younger brother and sister, moved to Rolling Meadows, Illinois where her father took a job in wallpaper sales. Sanders attended Willow Bend School, Central Road School and Carl Sandburg Junior High before moving back to Canada where she went to high school. The family settled in Waterloo, Ontario and Sanders worked at Dairy Queen, and was a lifeguard with the City of Waterloo. Sanders graduated from the University of Waterloo in 1986 with an honors degree in English. She then attended Ryerson Polytechnical Institute (now Toronto Metropolitan University) where she obtained a graduate degree in journalism in 1988.

== Career ==
Sanders began her career working as a television reporter for CHEX-TV in Peterborough, Ontario. She worked at various jobs including a stint with the Toronto Board of Education, and as a public relations consultant with Reid, Burry, Young in Toronto. She married Steven Greer, a lawyer, in 1991, and when her first child was born in 1993, she decided to pursue freelance journalism. She began writing as a journalist for national publications including the Toronto Star, Maclean's magazine, Canadian Living, the National Post, Reader's Digest, Homemakers and Today's Parent, and was published as Shelly Sanders Greer in most of her newspaper and magazine articles.

After 20 years of freelance writing, Sanders wrote her first novel, Rachel's Secret, an historical fiction, published in 2012 by Second Story Press. The plot followed her grandmother's journey from Imperial Russia to Shanghai in the early 1900s, and was the first in a series of three stories. Rachel's Secret received a starred review in Booklist Rachel's Secret was also an iTunes Book of the Week, May 10–17.

Rachel's Secret begins with the Kishinev Pogrom in 1903 and reveals life for Russian Jews at this time, living under the last Tsar. The story also has a Russian protagonist, Sergei, who starts out as anti-Semitic, but starts to question himself and his culture when he witnesses the atrocious events. The novel received generally favourable reviews.

To help make the leap from non-fiction journalism to historical fiction, Sanders completed the University of Toronto's Creative Writing Certificate in 2013.

Sanders' second novel, Rachel's Promise picks up where Rachel's Secret ended, with Rachel's family aboard the Trans-Siberian Railway headed east to escape from Russia. When they arrive in Shanghai, they are safe from anti-Semitic pogroms, but live in a ghetto barely making ends meet. Sanders received an Ontario Council of the Arts Grant to complete the book. Rachel's Secret was named a Notable Book for Teens by the 2013 Sydney Taylor Book Awards announced by the Association of Jewish Libraries. Rachel's Hope named a Notable Book for Teens by the 2015 Sydney Taylor Book Awards. and is a Recommended Book in the Canadian Children's Booknews, Fall 2014.

Sanders received a Canada Arts Council Grant to write the third book in the trilogy, Rachel's Hope, which was published in September, 2014. The plot focuses on the challenges faced by Rachel and her family as new immigrants to San Francisco. The book received critical acclaim. Rachel's Hope was shortlisted for the 2016 Vine Awards for Canadian Jewish Literature, presented by the Koffler Centre of the Arts.

Sanders has been chosen as a touring author by Canadian Children's Book Centre for Toronto Dominion Canadian Children's Book Week 2015 and will be touring Manitoba in May, 2015.

In March, 2015, Sanders was awarded a Canada Council for the Arts grant to complete The Shark's Wife, a literary fiction novel she began five years earlier. Sanders signed with literary agent Beverley Slopen in 2021, who sold Daughters of the Occupation to Harper Collins Canada (Patrick Crean Editions). It was published in April 2022 in Canada and in May 2022 in the US. Daughters of the Occupation was on the Canadian Bestsellers List for four weeks. Sanders signed with literary agent Marilyn Biderman with Transatlantic Literary Agency in 2025, who sold The Night Sparrow to HarperCollins Canada and HarperCollins US.| https://www.harpercollins.com/products/the-night-sparrow-shelly-sanders?variant=43182607400994| It was published in April 2022 in Canada and July 2022 in the US, and was an Instant Bestseller in Canada.<ref>| https://www.harpercollins.ca/9781443470537/the-night-sparrow/| https://www.theglobeandmail.com/arts/books/bestsellers/article-the-globe-and-mail-bestsellers-for-the-week-of-april-19-2025/|The Night Sparrow is also published by HarperCollins UK https://harpercollins.co.uk/products/the-night-sparrow-a-novel-shelly-sanders?variant=55201163051387|HarperCollins Australia https://www.harpercollins.com.au/9780063319226/the-night-sparrow/|HarperCollins New Zealand https://www.harpercollins.co.nz/9780063319219/the-night-sparrow/|The rights to Daughters of the Occupation have been sold to Jota publishing, the Czech Republic https://www.jota.cz/dcery-okupace.html|

== Works ==
=== Rachel trilogy ===
- —— (2012). Rachel's Secret (paperback ed.). Toronto: Second Story Press. ISBN 9781926920375.
- —— (2013). Rachel's Promise (paperback ed.). Toronto: Second Story Press. ISBN 9781927583142.
- —— (2014). Rachel's Hope (paperback ed.). Toronto: Second Story Press. ISBN 9781927583425.

=== Standalone ===
- —— (2022). Daughters of the Occupation (paperback 1st ed.). New York: HarperCollins. ISBN 9781443466226.
- —— (2025). The Night Sparrow (paperback international ed.). New York: HarperCollins. ISBN 9781443470537. ^{α}

==== Essays ====
- Jewish Book Council, Paper Brigade. Sanders, Shelly. Family Secrets Rooted in Latvia, 2022 https://www.jewishbookcouncil.org/pb-daily/family-secrets-rooted-in-latvia
- Writer's Digest. Sanders, Shelly. Balancing History and Story in Historical Fiction, 2022. https://www.writersdigest.com/write-better-fiction/balancing-history-and-story-in-historical-fiction
- Writer's Digest. Sanders, Shelly. ADHD: A Writer's Curse or Advantage? 2023 https://www.writersdigest.com/be-inspired/adhd-a-writers-curse-or-advantage
- Lit Hub. Sanders, Shelly.| Remembering the Unacknowledged Sacrifices of The Red Army's Female Snipers, 2025. https://lithub.com/remembering-the-unacknowledged-sacrifices-of-the-red-armys-female-snipers/
- Jewish Book Council PB Daily. Sanders, Shelly.| The Female Jewish Snipers Who Inspired The Night Sparrow,2025. https://www.jewishbookcouncil.org/pb-daily/the-female-jewish-snipers-who-inspired-the-night-sparrow
- Lilith McDonough, Yona Zeldis |Daughters of the Occupation Interview with Shelly Sanders, 2022 |https://lilith.org/2022/05/daughters-of-the-occupation/
