= Linwood Barclay =

American-born Canadian humourist, author, and columnist (b. 1955)

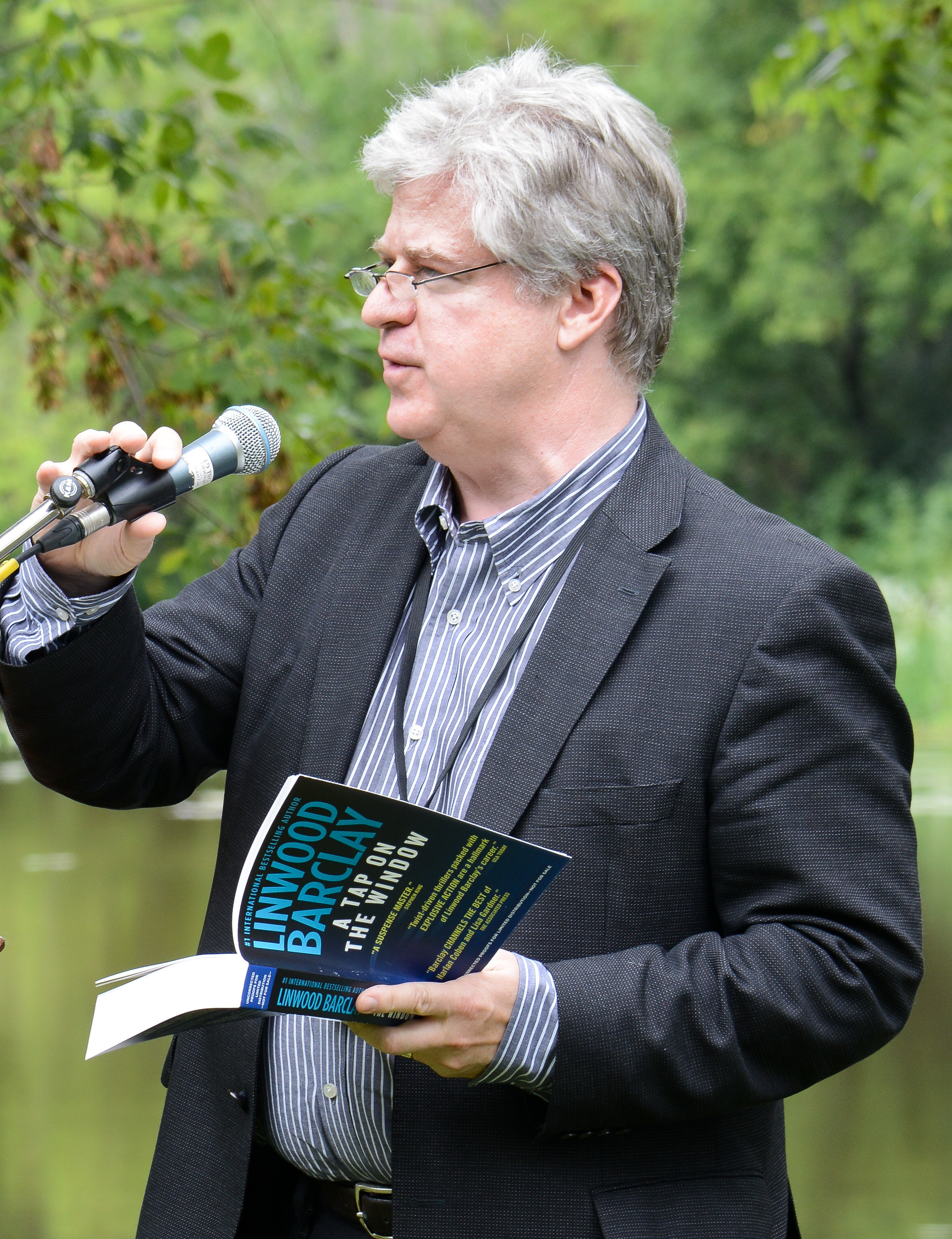
- Barclay at the Eden Mills Writers' Festival in 2013
- Born: March 1955 (age 71); Darien, Connecticut, United States of America.
- Education: Trent University
- Spouse: Neetha Sands Barclay
- Children: Spencer Barclay, Paige Barclay
- Writing career
- Language: English
- Subjects: Crime, humour
- Notable works: No Time For Goodbye; Trust Your Eyes
- Website: linwoodbarclay.com

Linwood Barclay (born 1955) is an American-born Canadian author, noted as a novelist, humorist, and (former) columnist. His popular detective novels are bestsellers in Canada and internationally, beginning with No Time for Goodbye in 2007.

== Biography ==
Linwood Barclay was born in Darien, Connecticut, son of Muriel and Everett Barclay. His father was a professional illustrator who moved his family to Canada in 1959 where he had accepted a job with William R. Templeton Studios in Toronto. In 1966 the family purchased a vacation campground in Bobcaygeon, Ontario, which they ran for about five years until his father died from lung cancer when Barclay was sixteen.

Barclay recognized his interest in writing detective fiction at an early age, inspired by the works of Ross Macdonald, who had grown up in Kitchener, Ontario. After graduating from high school Barclay studied literature at Trent University in Peterborough, Ontario, where one of his teachers was the noted novelist Margaret Laurence. While attending university, he began a correspondence with Macdonald that proved inspirational for Barclay. They met once, at which time Macdonald inscribed one of his books to Barclay: "For Linwood, who will, I hope, someday outwrite me".

After graduation with an English literature degree from Trent, he could not sell any of his novels so he found work on a number of local newspapers beginning with the Peterborough Examiner. He subsequently moved to the Toronto Star in 1981. In 1993, following the death of Gary Lautens, he began to write a thrice-weekly humour column for the paper. He also released podcasts of his articles and published three collections: Mike Harris Made Me Eat My Dog, Father Knows Zilch: A Guide for Dumbfounded Dads, and This House Is Nuts!. Between 2004 and 2007, while still writing his column, he published four mystery/comedies, all featuring a sleuth named Zack Walker who works as a newspaper columnist by day. The books were published in the United Kingdom and were modestly successful.

His break came in 2007 when he published No Time for Goodbye. A runaway bestseller in the UK, it quickly sold a million copies there and elsewhere. He took a one-year sabbatical to promote his novel and he had planned to return to the Star in September 2008. On June 28, 2008, he wrote his last column, announcing his retirement from the newspaper. His 2012 novel Trust Your Eyes was a finalist for the Crime Thriller Book Club Best Read from the UK Specsavers Crime Thriller Awards. At the time of its publication, it was announced that Trust Your Eyes had been optioned by a Hollywood studio. Barclay made the cover of Variety Magazine because of the bidding war it had caused between Universal Studios and Warner Bros. Eric McCormack had planned a script for a film version of No Time For Goodbye, with himself starring. The project never came to fruition. A French TV adaptation titled That Night, was made in 2023. The series appeared on TF1 Television in France on April 23, 2025.

Barclay lives in Oakville, Ontario, with his wife of more than three decades, Neetha, with whom he has two children - Spencer and Paige.

== Bibliography ==
=== Non-fiction ===
- Last Resort: A Memoir (2000, finalist for the Stephen Leacock Medal for Humour)

=== Humour ===
- Mike Harris Made Me Eat My Dog
- Father Knows Zilch: A Guide for Dumbfounded Dads
- This House Is Nuts!: Surviving the Absurdities of Everyday Life

=== Fiction ===
Year	Title	Publisher	Notes
2004	Bad Move	Bantam	1st Zack Walker novel
2005	Bad Guys	Bantam	2nd Zack Walker novel
2006	Lone Wolf	Bantam	3rd Zack Walker novel
2007	Stone Rain	Bantam	4th Zack Walker novel
2007	No Time for Goodbye	Orion	Featured on Richard & Judy's Summer reading list
2008	Too Close to Home	Bantam	Arthur Ellis Award for Best Novel (2009), part of the Promise Falls series
2009	Fear the Worst	Bantam	
2010	Never Look Away	Delacorte Press	Part of the Promise Falls series
2011	The Accident	Orion	
2011	Clouded Vision	Orion	Quick read
2012	Trust Your Eyes	Doubleday Canada	ISBN 9780385669573. Originally titled 360: A Novel ISBN 9780553807950. Part of the Promise Falls series
2013	Never Saw it Coming	Orion	Based on the novella Clouded Vision. ISBN 9781409141419 Features characters that appeared in No Time For Goodbye
2013	A Tap on the Window	New American Library	ISBN 9780451414182
2014	No Safe House	Doubleday Canada	ISBN 9780451414205. Sequel to No Time for Goodbye 2007
2015	Broken Promise	New American Library	ISBN 9780451472670. First in the Promise Falls trilogy
2015	Final Assignment	Orion	A novella ebook
2016	Far From True	New American Library	ISBN 9780451472700. Second in the Promise Falls trilogy
2016	The Twenty Three	New American Library	ISBN 9780451472724. Third in the Promise Falls trilogy
2017	Parting Shot	Orion	ISBN 9781409163930 Fourth in the Promise Falls series
2017	Chase	Puffin Canada	ISBN 9780143198758. First book in the Chase series, written for kids (ages 9+)
2018	Escape	Puffin Canada	ISBN 9780143198789. Second book in the Chase series, written for kids (ages 9+)
2018	A Noise Downstairs	Doubleday Canada	ISBN 9780385687188
2019	Elevator Pitch	William Morrow	ISBN 9780062678287
2021	Find You First	William Morrow	ISBN 9780062678317
2022	Take Your Breath Away	William Morrow	ISBN 9780063035133 Shortlisted for 2023 CWA Ian Fleming Steel Dagger
2022	Look Both Ways	William Morrow	ISBN 9780008525613
2023	The Lie Maker	William Morrow	ISBN 9780063276246
2024	I Will Ruin You	William Morrow	ISBN 9780063276314
2025	Whistle	William Morrow	ISBN 9780063436039
2026	Not a Word	William Morrow	
