= C. B. Forrest =

Canadian writer

C. B. Forrest is a Canadian mystery and general fiction writer and poet. Forrest is a member of Crime Writers of Canada and Capital Crime Writers.

== Career ==
Forrest published The Weight of Stones, the first entry in his mystery series featuring detective Charlie McKelvey, in April 2009 via Napoleon and Co. It received generally good reception with The Globe and Mail criticizing the plot's weakness and melodrama but ultimately saying that the series has promise. It was shortlisted for the Arthur Ellis Award for Best First Novel. The second in the series, Slow Recoil, was released in fall 2010 by Dundurn Press and was nominated for the Arthur Ellis Award for Best Novel. The third novel in the series, The Devil's Dust, was released in 2012 to strong reviews. Tim Wynne-Jones called it "a beautifully crafted novel."

His short fiction, The Lost Father, won an award in the Canadian Authors' Association Short Story Contest in 2004. In 2001, his novella titled Coming To was adapted to the stage and showcased at the Factory Theatre during Toronto's Summerworks festival. He wrote songs for the performer Paula Waite, as well as songwriting duties for the band The Henrudys, including "Another Mile" and "Better Than I Am" as featured on CBC.

His poetry has appeared in various publications, such as Contemporary Verse 2, Bloodlotus Journal, Bywords Quarterly Journal, and Ascent Aspirations, and has earned praise from writers such as George Elliott Clarke and Stephen Reid.

== Personal life ==
Forrest began his career in journalism and now works in communications and marketing. In 1998, he studied under the author and poet B. W. Powe as a student of the Humber School for Writers.

He lives in Calgary where he is last reported to be working on several new pieces of long fiction.

== List of publications ==
=== Novels ===
==== Standalone ====
- Chasing Pace, 2005

==== Charlie McKelvey series ====
1. The Weight of Stones, 2009
2. Slow Recoil, Dundurn, 2010
3. The Devil's Dust, Dundurn, 2012

=== Novellas ===
- Coming To

=== Poetry ===
- White Out
- Bloodlotus Journal
- Bywords Quarterly Journal
- "Post-it Note for a Daughter"
