= Michael E. Rose =

Canadian author

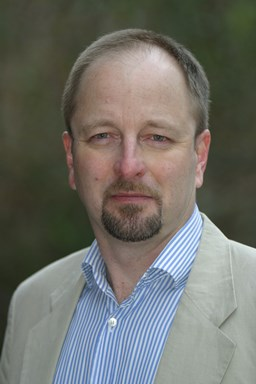
- Born: May 18, 1954 (age 72); Montreal, Quebec, Canada
- Education: Concordia University; Carleton University, Canada; Wollongong University, Australia
- Occupations: Author; Journalist; Communications Consultant
- Spouse: Sheryle Anne Bagwell (Journalist/Broadcaster)
- Writing career
- Period: 1990–present
- Genres: Mystery, Thriller
- Notable awards: Shortlisted, Arthur Ellis Award for Best First Novel for The Mazovia Legacy, 2004. Shortlisted, Arthur Ellis Award for Best Novel for The Tsunami File, 2009
- Website: www.michaelrosemedia.com

Michael E. Rose (born May 18, 1954) is a Canadian author of books which include thriller novels. He is also a playwright. He is a former journalist, broadcaster and foreign correspondent, and the former Chief of Communications for Interpol.

== Background ==
Rose was born to an English-speaking family in Lachine, Quebec, an inner suburb of predominantly French-speaking Montreal. He attended Summerlea School, then Lachine High School. He studied on a scholarship beginning in 1971 at what was then known as Loyola College, a Jesuit post-secondary institution that was eventually merged into Concordia University before Rose graduated. Rose originally studied psychology and English literature before dropping out of university in 1974. He worked at a pub in London, then returned to Montreal where he took jobs as a social worker for a time. He returned to Concordia in 1977 to finish his BA degree. Before graduation, he was awarded the Concordia Arts Award for his first stage play, "Gallery". He then attended Carleton University Journalism School in Ottawa from 1978 to 1979, where he completed a second bachelor's degree, this time in Journalism. He also now holds a Master of Arts by Research (Journalism/Communication Studies) from the University of Wollongong in Australia.

== Journalism career ==
Rose began his career as a radio reporter at the Canadian Broadcasting Corporation in Montreal in 1979. He then took up the post of Radio News Editor at CBC Calgary. In 1984 he joined the Canadian division of the UPI wire service, UPC, in Ottawa. When UPC closed in 1985, he joined Maclean's Magazine as a Senior Writer in the Parliamentary Bureau. By 1988 he was Bureau Chief for Maclean's in Montreal.

In 1988–89 Rose was a visiting fellow at the Journalists in Europe Foundation in Paris. From there he went to Sydney, to establish the inaugural program in journalism studies at the University of Western Sydney, Nepean. Then he worked as an Assistant Editor on the Foreign Desk of the Sydney Morning Herald newspaper. In 1998, he joined the Reuters news agency in London as one of a team of Chief Editors, working there until 2003. In that year he was hired as Chief of Communications and Publications for Interpol in Lyon, France. In 2006 he returned to Sydney, and worked for Amnesty International Australia, The Reserve Bank of Australia, and then the Australian Press Council in senior communications roles. He also ran a communications consultancy company, Global Communication Associates.

Over his 40-year journalism and communications career, Rose has travelled to more than 70 countries. He has written in media genres including news reporting, political commentary and analysis, as well as feature and travel articles. Rose has taught journalism at the University of Western Sydney in Australia, as well as the University of Sydney and University of Technology Sydney. He has delivered guest lectures at Concordia University and the University of Hanoi. He has also trained working journalists in Nigeria, Sierra Leone, South Africa, East Timor, Thailand, Sweden and Papua New Guinea.

== Writing career ==
Rose began his work as a writer while still at Concordia University. His play "Gallery" won the Concordia Arts award in 1978. That play has never been performed. His next play "Lotto Cantata" was shortlisted for the Clifford E. Lee Award for best new play in 1979. His third play "Gameshow" was produced at Montreal's Phoenix Theatre in 1980.

His first spy thriller, The Mazovia Legacy, was published in Canada in 2003 by McArthur & Company Publishing, Toronto. That house published his next two thrillers in the Frank Delaney series, The Burma Effect and The Tsunami File. The first and third novels in the series were shortlisted for prizes in the Arthur Ellis Awards in 2004 and 2009 respectively.

After the closure of McArthur & Company in 2012, the Frank Delaney series was re-issued globally by Momentum Books in Australia, a division of Pan MacMillan.

Rose has also published a children's book, "Kangaroo Christmas", and a non-fiction work about Aboriginal journalism in Australia, "For the Record".

His first work of satire, Interpol Confidential, was published in early 2016 by UK publisher SilverWood Books. In 2017, he completed a new play about family life in contemporary China, entitled Glorious. The script was presented in a staged reading format before an audience of 150 people at New Theatre in Sydney, Australia in April 2023.

Rose is a member of the Writers' Union of Canada, the Australian Society of Authors and International Thriller Writers. His Australian-born wife, Sheryle Bagwell, is a journalist and broadcaster. They began living in their village house in Vaucluse, France, in late 2018.

== Awards ==
- Australia Council for the Arts, Career Development Grant, 2015.
- Shortlisted, Arthur Ellis Award for Best First Novel for The Mazovia Legacy, 2004.
- Shortlisted, Arthur Ellis Award for Best Novel for The Tsunami File, 2009
- Visiting Fellow, Journalists in Europe Foundation, Paris, 1988–89

== Bibliography ==
=== Novels ===
- —— (2003). The Mazovia Legacy. Toronto: McArthur & Company.
- —— (2006). The Burma Effect. Toronto: McArthur & Company.
- —— (2008). The Tsunami File. Toronto: McArthur & Company.
- —— (2016). Interpol Confidential. Bristol, UK: SilverWood Books.

=== Children's Books ===
- —— (2006). Kangaroo Christmas. Calgary: Bayeux Arts Publishing.

=== Non-Fiction ===
- —— (1996). For the Record. Sydney: Allen & Unwin.

=== Stage Plays ===
- —— (1978). Gallery. Montreal: Winner of the Concordia University Arts Prize.
- —— (1979). Lotto Cantata. Canada: Runner-up in the Clifford E. Lee National Playwriting Awards.
- —— (1980). Gameshow. Montreal: Produced at the Phoenix Theatre.
- —— (2023). Glorious. Sydney: Staged reading at the New Theatre.
