= R. J. Harlick =

Canadian mystery writer

R. J. Harlick is a Canadian mystery writer. Her Meg Harris mystery series is set in the Canadian wilderness.

With the Meg Harris mystery series Harlick introduces protagonist Meg Harris who has fled the urban frenzy of Toronto and her failed marriage to a remote wilderness property in West Quebec. The only neighbour to her 1,500-acre (6.1 km^{2}) property is the 35-square-mile (91 km^{2}) reserve of the Fishhook Algonquins, or Migiskan Anishinabeg. Her sought after peace is interrupted by injustice and murder. Unable to ignore it, Meg invariably becomes enmeshed in a quagmire of murderous intrigue.""

Harlick is a member of, and former president of Capital Crime Writers. She is also a member of, and former Regional Vice President of Crime Writers of Canada. She is a member of Sisters in Crime. She has participated as a panellist at various mystery conferences such as Bouchercon, Left Coast Crime, Bloody Words and Malice Domestic.

Reviewing the Evidence called her "the queen of Canadian wilderness fiction."

== Biography ==
In her former career, Harlick worked for major computer corporations such as IBM and DMR Group, then with her own management consultancy practice. She was a member of the Canadian Institute of Management Consultants and held the CMC designation.

She is an avid supporter of environmental causes and worked for several years on the board of the Ottawa Valley chapter of Canadian Parks and Wilderness Society.

Originally from Toronto, and an alumna of the University of Toronto, she, her husband, Jim, and poodle Sterling divide their time between living in Ottawa and West Quebec.

== Awards ==
- Lady Luck 3rd place Winner of the Bony Pete Award, 2002

== Publications ==
=== Novels ===
- Death's Golden Whisper, Dundurn Press, 2004
- Red Ice for a Shroud, Dundurn Press, 2006
- The River Runs Orange, Dundurn Press, 2008
- Arctic Blue Death, Dundurn Press, 2009
- A Green Place for Dying, Dundurn Press, 2012
- Silver Totem of Shame, Dundurn Press, 2014
- A Cold White Fear, Dundurn Press, 2015
- Purple Palette for Murder, Dundurn Press, 2017

=== Short stories ===
- When the Red, Red Robin... in Bone Dance: a Crime and Mystery Collection by the Ladies Killing Circle, edited by Sue Pike and Joan Boswell RendezVous Press, 2003 ISBN 978-1-894917-05-6
- Lady Luck in Bloody Words; The Anthology, edited by Cheryl Freeman & Carol Soles Baskerville Books, 2003 ISBN 0-9686776-6-5
- Seigneur Poisson in Fit to Die: a Crime and Mystery Collection by The Ladies Killing Circle, edited by Joan Boswell and Sue Pike RendezVous Press, 2001 ISBN 0-929141-87-3
