= Peggy Blair =

Canadian lawyer

Peggy J. Blair is a Canadian lawyer and author. Blair has been a member of the Law Society of Upper Canada since 1990 and is a past member of the Law Society of Alberta (1982–1999). Blair is considered an expert in Indigenous legal issues. After leaving active law practice, Blair has become a mystery writer.

== Legal career ==
Blair has a Masters in law (1998) and a doctorate in law (2003), both from the University of Ottawa. She was the first anglophone to be awarded the Prix d'excellence by the Association des professeurs de droit du Québec.

In 1993, Blair was the lead counsel in R. v. Jones and Nadjiwon, the first Canadian case to recognize Indigenous persons' treaty rights to fish commercially in priority to other users. As a result of the backlash which followed, which included Indigenous-owned boats being set on fire, protest marches and a stabbing/swarming incident in Owen Sound, in 1993 she attended Harvard University to train in Negotiation Skills. An expert in Aboriginal cross-cultural negotiations, in 2001 Blair was then involved in multi-party negotiations to resolve the issues around the fisheries, which ultimately resulted in a co-management agreement between the First Nations and the governments of Canada and Ontario, involving all aspects of Great Lakes fisheries management.

Blair worked for the Royal Commission on Aboriginal Peoples as a policy adviser on land claims and dispute resolution issues. From 1993 to 1999, Blair was appointed as a part-time member with the Canadian Human Rights Tribunal where she conducted hearings across Canada into allegations of discrimination. From 1997 to 1998, she was the Chief Federal Negotiator in self-government negotiations involving 27 communities in northern Ontario. She worked on a number of Indian Claims Commission reports. In 2003, Blair was selected by a multi-stakeholder panel as a Senior Adjudicator for the Indian Residential Schools claims dispute resolution process, hearing claims of sexual and physical abuse across Canada.

Blair has been widely cited by notable Canadian scholars such as Dr. John Borrows, Douglas Harris, Kent MacNeil, and Mark Walters, as well as others, for her legal analysis of Aboriginal hunting and fishing issues. Blair has been regularly named by Lexpert as one of Canada's leading lawyers in her field since 1996. and is a regular speaker and commentator at conferences and in the media on Aboriginal issues and negotiations. She is currently listed in Canada's Who's Who as well as Lexpert.

In December 2004, Dr. Blair traveled to Ukraine as an election observer during the presidential elections as part of the Canada Corps.

== Author ==
Blair left law in 2010 to become a realtor and mystery author in Ottawa. Her debut novel, The Beggar's Opera, was rejected 156 times before it was short-listed for a Debut Dagger Award by the UK Crime Writers' Association in 2010 and picked up by Penguin Canada in a two-book deal. It was shortlisted for an Arthur Ellis Award for Best First Novel in Canada and won the Giller Prize Readers' Choice Award in 2012. It has since been published in the UK (Midnight in Havana, Polygon), the US (The Beggar's Opera, Pintail), Norway (TiggerDramaet, Cappelen Damm), Germany (Die Geister von Havanna, Rowholt), Holland (Schaduwzijde, Unieboek), and the Czech Republic and will soon be published in Israel.

Blair's second book in the Inspector Ramirez series, The Poisoned Pawn, has also been critically acclaimed. Her third book, Hungry Ghosts, was released by Simon and Schuster Canada in June, 2015 and hit The Globe and Mail bestsellers list; the fourth in the Inspector Ramirez series, Umbrella Man, was published in 2016. In 2017, Umbrella Man was nominated for the Ottawa Book Award.

Blair has published widely on Indigenous issues concerning resource use and governance, on the rights of Aboriginal women and on Aboriginal culture. Her book, Lament for a First Nation, is highly critical of the Howard decision of the Supreme Court of Canada which removed the rights to hunt and fish of the seven Williams Treaties First Nations in Southern Ontario. It was published in May, 2008 by the University of Washington and UBC Press.

== Works ==
=== Non-fiction ===
- Lament for a First Nation: the Williams Treaties of Southern Ontario. Vancouver: University of British Columbia Press. 2008. ISBN 9780774815130.

=== Fiction ===
Inspector Ramírez series:

- The Beggar's Opera. Toronto: Penguin Group (Canada). 2012. ISBN 9780143179986.
- The Poisoned Pawn. Toronto: Penguin Group (Canada). 2013. ISBN 9780143179993.
- Hungry Ghosts. Simon and Schuster. 2015. ISBN 9781476757940.
- Umbrella Man. Simon & Schuster. 2016. ISBN 9781476757971.
