= Loreth Anne White =

South African author

- Born: South Africa
- Occupation: Writer
- Writing career
- Period: 2003–
- Genres: Romance novel, Thriller
- Notable awards: Daphne du Maurier Award
- Website: www.lorethannewhite.com

Loreth Anne White is a South African Canadian writer known for her romantic thrillers and romance novels.

== Biography ==
Loreth Anne White was born in South Africa. She worked for 16 years in South Africa and Canada as a reporter, journalist, and editor under the name Loreth Beswetherick.

She has been nominated for the RITA Award three times and has been honored with the Daphne du Maurier Award.

White is a member of the Canadian Thriller Writers Association, the Romance Writers of America, and other organizations.

She lives with her family in Whistler, Canada.

== Writing career ==
Loreth Anne White's writing career began with a focus on romance, but she quickly established herself in the romantic suspense and thriller genres. She has received critical acclaim for her ability to blend elements of mystery and romance, creating stories that keep readers on the edge of their seats. Her first novel, Melting the Ice, was published in 2003.

White's first major success came with A Dark Lure (2015), a novel praised for its gripping suspense and richly drawn characters. This was followed by The Drowned Girls (2017), the first book in the Angie Pallorino series, which further cemented her reputation as a master of romantic suspense. The series follows Detective Angie Pallorino as she navigates her career in the Violent Crimes Section while dealing with her own personal demons.

In 2019, White released The Dark Bones, a follow up to A Dark Lure. The third novel in this series is In the Barren Ground. Although the date released is 2016, which makes it the second book written. The Dark Bones was well-received for its taut narrative and strong sense of atmosphere.

== Bibliography ==
=== Standalone novels ===
- In the Waning Light (2015)
- In the Dark (2019)
- In the Deep (2020)
- Beneath Devil's Bridge (2021)
- The Patient's Secret (2022)
- The Maid's Diary (2023)
- The Unquiet Bones (2024)
- The Swimmer (2024)

=== Series ===
==== Shadow Soldiers series ====
1. The Heart of a Mercenary (2006)
2. A Sultan's Ransom (2006)
3. Rules of Re-Engagement (2006)
4. Seducing the Mercenary (2007)
5. The Heart of a Renegade (2008)

==== Wild Country series ====
1. Manhunter (2008)
2. Cold Case Affair (2009)

==== Sahara Kings series ====
1. The Sheik's Command (2010)
2. Sheik's Revenge (2012)
3. Surgeon Sheik's Rescue (2012)
4. Guarding the Princess (2012)

==== Angie Pallorino series ====
1. The Drowned Girls (2017)
2. The Lullaby Girl (2017)
3. The Girl in the Moss (2018)

==== Dark Lure series ====
1. A Dark Lure (2015)
2. The Dark Bones (2019)
3. In the Barren Ground (2016)
