= Kim Moritsugu =

Canadian writer

Kim Moritsugu is a Canadian writer. An alumna of the University of Toronto, she worked in a corporate setting for several years before publishing her debut novel, Looks Perfect, in 1996. She has since published three more novels, and teaches creative writing at Humber College's School for Writers.

Looks Perfect was a nominee for the Toronto Book Awards in 1997, and The Glenwood Treasure was a nominee for the Arthur Ellis Award for Best Crime Novel in 2004.

== Awards ==
Year	Title	Award	Category	Result	Ref.
1997	Looks Perfect	Toronto Book Awards	—	Finalist	
2004	The Glenwood Treasure	Arthur Ellis Award	Crime Novel	Shortlisted	

== Works ==
- Looks Perfect (1996)
- Old Flames (1999)
- The Glenwood Treasure (2003)
- The Restoration of Emily (2006)
- And Everything Nice (2011)
- The Oakdale Dinner Club (2013)
- The Showrunner (2018)

== See also ==
- List of Canadian writers
