= Nora Kelly (writer) =

American-born Canadian writer (born 1945)

Nora Kelly (born August 29, 1945) is an American-born Canadian writer who mainly writes mystery fiction.

== Biography ==
She was born in Paterson, New Jersey and grew up in New Jersey. Kelly lived in New York City, London, Cambridge and Nairobi before settling in Vancouver. She received a bachelor's degree from the University of British Columbia and a PhD in history from Simon Fraser University. Kelly also studied at the University of Cambridge.

She received the Arthur Ellis Award in 1999 for her novel Old Wounds, featuring academic sleuth Gillian Adams who also appears in other mystery novels by Kelly. She also published Quest for a Profession: The History of the Vancouver General Hospital School of Nursing in 1973.

Kelly, who lives in the Vancouver neighbourhood of Strathcona, was the founding president of City Opera Vancouver. She has also been an associate producer for the opera company and has written a libretto.

== Awards ==
- 1999 Arthur Ellis Award for Old Wounds
- 2003 Arthur Ellis Award nomination for Hot Pursuit

== Selected works ==
- The Shadow of King's (1986)
- My Sister's Keeper (1993)
- Bad Chemistry (1994)
- Old Wounds (1999)
- Hot Pursuit (2002)
