= No Time for Goodbye =

Thriller novel by Linwood Barclay

- Book cover
- Author: Linwood Barclay
- Cover artist: Getty Images & Alamy
- Language: English
- Genre: Thriller
- Publisher: Orion Publishing Group
- Publication date: December 31, 2007
- Publication place: Canada
- Pages: 437
- ISBN: 978-0-7528-9368-6

No Time for Goodbye is a thriller novel written by the Canadian author Linwood Barclay. The novel follows the husband of a young woman, whose family vanished when she was a teenager, who finds himself investigating the mystery of what happened to his wife's family. The book was featured on the Richard & Judy summer reading list in 2008 and The Sunday Times reported in its 2008 year-end bestseller list that the novel led the paperback and hardcover fiction list with sales of 636,105 copies.

== Summary ==
One evening in May 1983, 14-year-old Cynthia Bigge has a fight with her parents, Clayton and Patricia, after secretly being on a date with a boy, Vince. Cynthia wakes up the next morning, to find her father, her mother and her brother Todd have all mysteriously disappeared from their home.

Twenty-five years after her parents and brother's disappearance, Cynthia who was adopted by her aunt, Tess Berman, is married to Terry Archer and they have a daughter Grace. Still haunted by the uncertain fate of her parents and brother, Cynthia attempts to find out what happened. A revelation by Cynthia's aunt to Terry and some strange events in and around their home leads Cynthia and Terry to discover what happened 25 years earlier. Following Tess's sudden murder as well that of Denton Abagnall, a private detective hired to investigate the vanishing of Cynthia's parents and brother, Terry finds a connection to the death of a woman named Connie Gormley.

Ultimately, Terry finds Clayton, who has been alive this whole time, but is dying of cancer; Clayton explains all, revealing he has been living a double life, being married to an unstable woman named Enid and their son Jeremy, who is Cynthia's half brother, as well as living his life with Patricia, Todd and Cynthia. Enid found out about his affair and killed Patricia and Todd, while Clayton at first kept silent about Cynthia and had to vanish himself to ensure her well-being. Clayton sacrifices himself to kill Enid and Jeremy, saving Cynthia, Grace and Terry. Terry ultimately deduces that Rolly had killed Tess and Abagnall and Gormley and had been sending money via Clayton to pay for Cynthia's education. As Terry and his family attempt to move on, Terry comforts Cynthia by revealing a letter written by Patricia the night of her murder, that was given to him by Clayton.

== Critical reception ==
The novel received mainly positive reviews. Emma-Lee Potter of The Daily Express called the novel "a fast-moving roller-coaster of a read" and Laura Wilson of The Guardian wrote, "Barclay succeeds in both banging the gong and serving up a riveting, rewarding and, for the most part, plausible three courses, though you may need to take a deep breath somewhere around the coffee stage."

== Sequel ==
No Safe House is the continuation of No Time For Goodbye.

== International adaptation ==
Eric McCormack had planned a script for a film version, with himself starring. The project never came to fruition. A French TV adaptation titled That Night, was made in 2023. The series changes the setting to in France, changes the characters name to fit with their French ethnicity (Cynthia is renamed Sofia), and has her family vanish the night before September 11, 2001, leading to their disappearance being overshadowed. The series appeared on TF1 Television in France on April 23, 2025.
