= Inspector Montalbano (TV series) =

Italian TV series (9 seasons, 1999–2021)

- Italian: Il commissario Montalbano
- Genre: Detective fiction
- Created by: Andrea Camilleri
- Starring: Luca Zingaretti; Cesare Bocci; Peppino Mazzotta; Angelo Russo; Davide Lo Verde; Marcello Perracchio; Roberto Nobile; Isabell Sollman; Katharina Böhm; Lina Perned; Sonia Bergamasco
- Country of origin: Italy
- Original languages: Italian; Sicilian
- No. of seasons: 15
- No. of episodes: 37 (list of episodes)

Production
- Running time: 100 minutes
- Production companies: Palomar; Rai Fiction; Sveriges Television (SVT)

Original release
- Network: RAI 1 and RAI 2
- Release: 6 May 1999 – 8 March 2021

Related
- The Young Montalbano

The Inspector Montalbano (Italian: Il commissario Montalbano [il kommisˈsaːrjo montalˈbaːno]) is an Italian police procedural television series. Based on Andrea Camilleri's detective novels, the series is located in the fictional town of Vigàta, Sicily, which is based on Camilleri's native Porto Empedocle. The title character, played by Luca Zingaretti, is Commissario (police chief) Salvo Montalbano.

The music for the soundtrack was composed by Franco Piersanti.

Inspector Montalbano was produced and broadcast by RAI to critical acclaim. It premiered on Rai 2, and then, since the fourth season, on Rai 1. Over 65 countries have broadcast the series, including on BBC Four in the United Kingdom, MHz WorldView in the United States and SBS in Australia. In 2012, the series generated a spin-off, The Young Montalbano.

== Synopsis ==
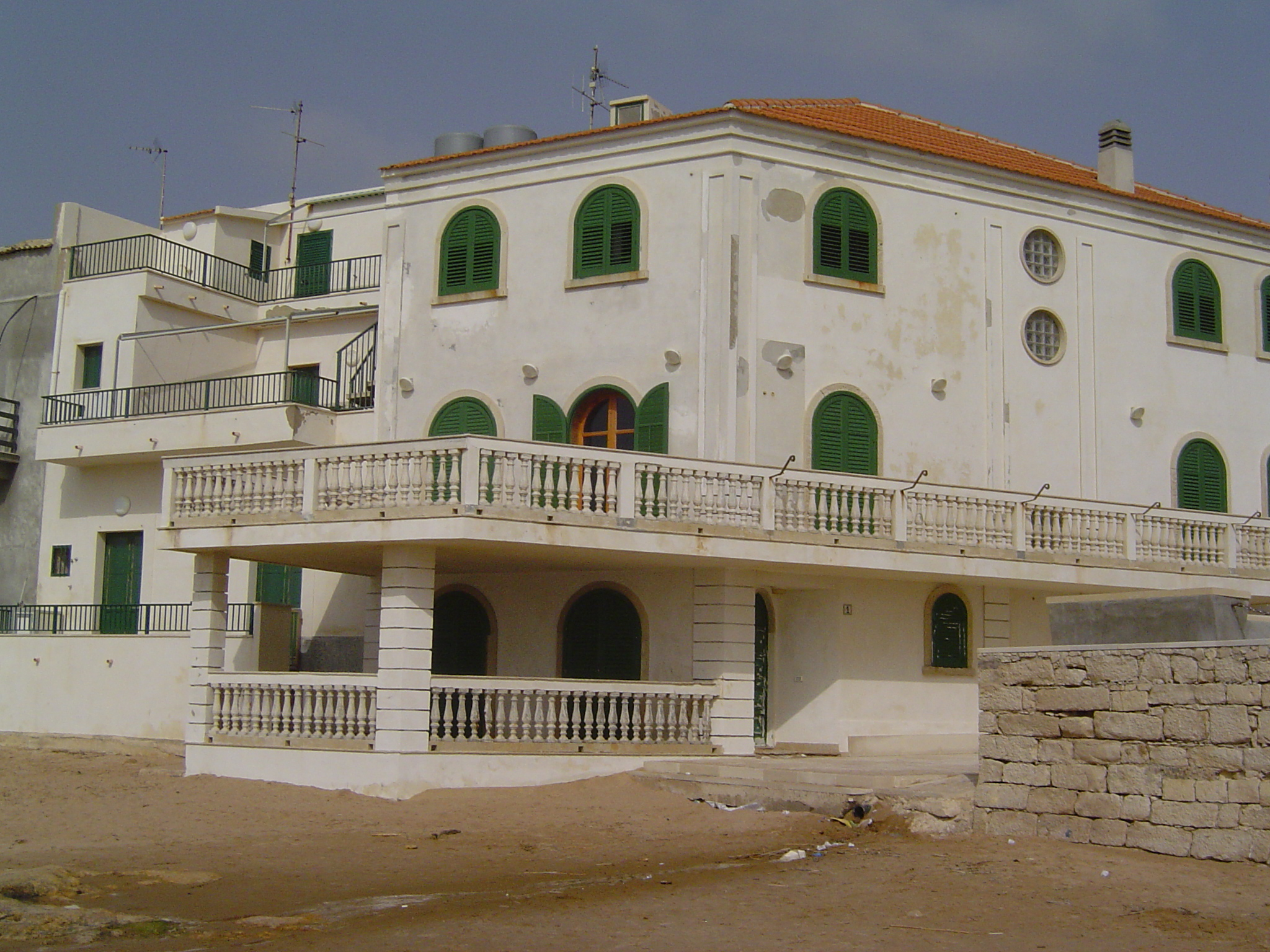
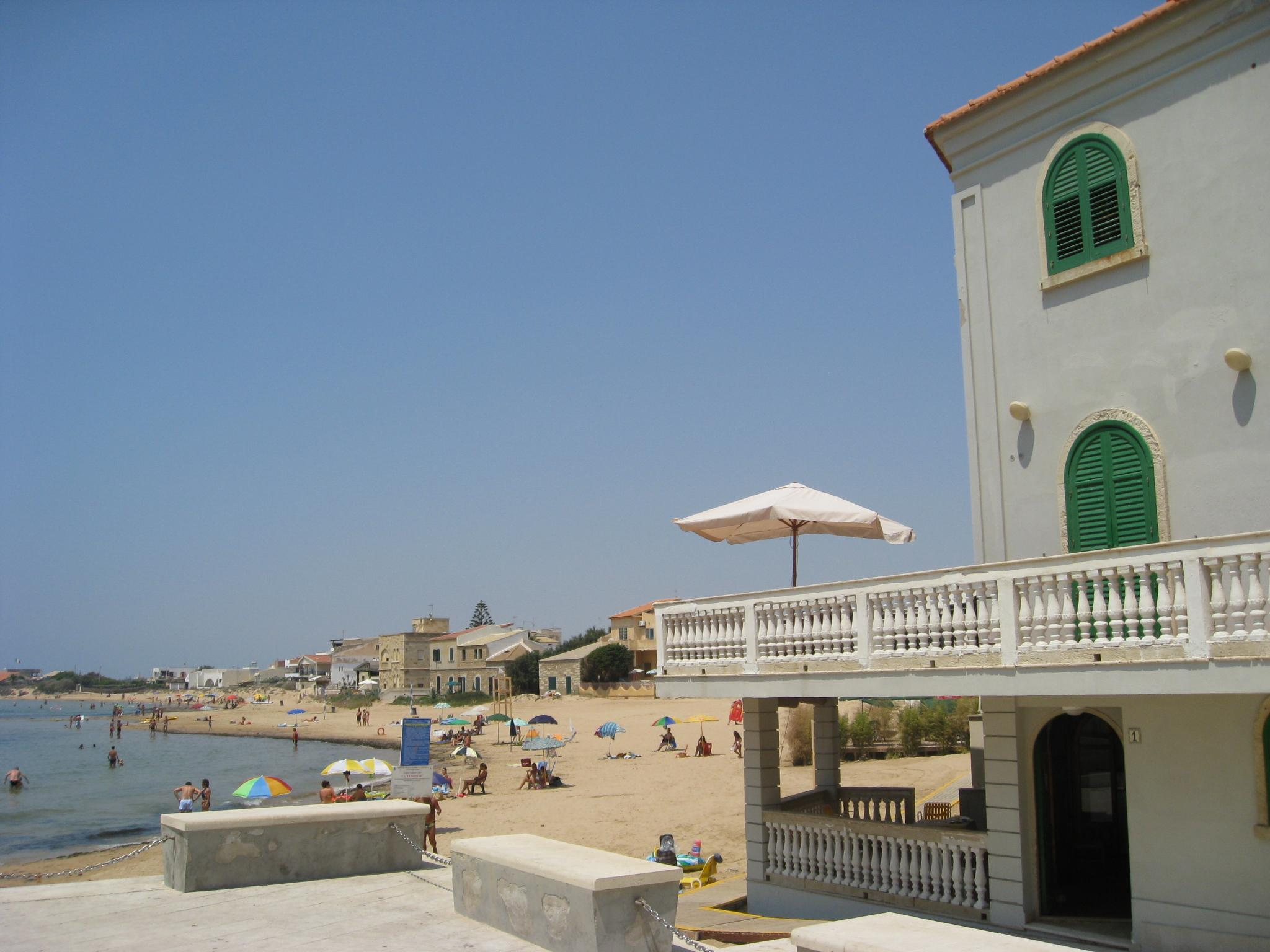
Montalbano's house in the fictional Marinella, actually in Punta Secca, district of Santa Croce Camerina

Inspector Salvo Montalbano is in charge of the state police station in Vigàta, a fictional town in the fictional province of Montelusa (see locations) in Sicily, Southern Italy. Montalbano investigates criminal acts which he always manages to solve by reconstruction thanks to his intelligence and the help of his team which includes his deputy, Domenico 'Mimì' Augello, Giuseppe Fazio, Galluzzo, and Agatino Catarella. Salvo has a long-distance, tempestuous relationship with Livia Burlando who lives in Genoa.

Among his external collaborators are:

- his Swedish friend, Ingrid Sjöström, who lives in neighbouring Montelusa
- the journalist, Nicolò Zito
- Vigàta's local forensic pathologist Dr. Marco Pasquano
- his cook and housekeeper, Adelina Cirrinciò

== Cast ==
=== Main characters ===
- Luca Zingaretti as Inspector Salvo Montalbano, the police chief of Vigàta (season 1−15)
- Cesare Bocci as Inspector Domenico "Mimì" Augello, unrepentant womanizer, Montalbano's deputy and close friend (season 1−15)
- Peppino Mazzotta as Detective Giuseppe Fazio, Montalbano's right-hand man (season 1−15)
- Angelo Russo as Agatino Catarella, clumsy and weird speaking police officer, well skilled with computers (season 1−15)
- Davide Lo Verde as Galluzzo, police officer (seasons 1–15)
- Roberto Nobile as Nicolò Zito, journalist of local TV station Rete Libera and trusted friend of Montalbano (season 1−15)
- Marcello Perracchio as Dr. Marco Pasquano, gruff forensic pathologist (seasons 1–11)
- Katharina Böhm (seasons 1–4), Lina Perned (season 9) and Sonia Bergamasco (seasons 10−15) as Livia Burlando, Montalbano's long-distance girlfriend who lives in Genoa and sometimes visits Vigàta. Both Böhm and Perned were dubbed by Claudia Catani, who also played Livia's voice on the telephone in seasons 5–8, where the character doesn't physically appear.

=== Recurring characters ===
- Isabell Sollman as Ingrid, Montalbano's Swedish friend (seasons 2–5, 7–8, 11)
- Mirella Petralia as Adelina Cirrinciò, Montalbano's housekeeper/cook (seasons 4, 7 and 9)
- Ketty Governali as Adelina Cirrinciò, Montalbano's housekeeper/cook (seasons 11, 12)
- Fabio Costanzo as Pasquale Cirrinciò, Adelina's son, engaged in petty criminal activities but still a friend of Montalbano (seasons 4, 7, 9 and 12)
- Carmelinda Gentile as Beatrice "Beba" Di Leo, becomes Mimì's wife (main: season 5; guest: seasons 3–4, 6–8, 12)
- Giovanni Guardiano as Jacomuzzi, police forensics specialist (seasons 1–5, 8, 12–13)
- Giacinto Ferro (1943–2016) as Police Chief Bonetti-Alderighi, Montalbano's superior based in the provincial capital, Montelusa (seasons 1, 4–5, 7–9, 11)
- Giovanni Visentin as Judge Tommaseo, morbidly attracted to the more spicy aspects of the cases (seasons 7–9, 11)
- Filippo Brazzaventre as Filippo Ragonese, political journalist at local TV station Televigàta, strong detractor of Montalbano (seasons 4–10)
- Ubaldo Lo Presti as Filippo Ragonese, political journalist at local TV station Televigàta, strong detractor of Montalbano (seasons 1–2)
- Francesco Stella as Gallo, police officer (seasons 1–2)
- Marco Cavallaro as Tortorella, police officer (seasons 4–6)
- Corrado Invernizzi as Lattes, Bonetti-Alderighi's secretary (seasons 1–3, 8)
- Francesco Sineri as Don Balduccio Sinagra, retired mafia boss (seasons 3–5)

== Seasons and episodes ==
Series	Episodes	Originally released	
Series	Episodes	First released	Last released
1	2	6 May 1999	13 May 1999
2	2	2 May 2000	9 May 2000
3	2	9 May 2001	16 May 2001
4	4	28 October 2002	18 November 2002
5	2	22 September 2005	29 September 2005
6	2	7 March 2006	13 March 2006
7	4	2 November 2008	17 November 2008
8	4	14 March 2011	4 April 2011
9	4	15 April 2013	6 May 2013
10	2	29 February 2016	7 March 2016
11	2	27 February 2017	6 March 2017
12	2	12 February 2018	19 February 2018
13	2	11 February 2019	18 February 2019
14	2	9 March 2020	16 March 2020
15	1	8 March 2021	

Series	Episode #	Original Italian broadcast	Original Italian title	English novel translation	English TV title translation	Original BBC Four broadcast	UK ratings
Season 1	01	6 May 1999	"Il ladro di merendine"	The Snack Thief	"The Snack Thief"	11 February 2012	640,000
Season 1	02	13 May 1999	"La voce del violino"	The Voice of the Violin	"The Voice of the Violin"	18 February 2012	721,000
Season 2	03	2 May 2000	"La forma dell'acqua"	The Shape of Water	"The Shape of Water"	25 February 2012	744,000
Season 2	04	9 May 2000	"Il cane di terracotta"	The Terracotta Dog	"The Mystery of the Terracotta Dog"	3 March 2012	664,000
Season 3	05	9 May 2001	"La gita a Tindari"	Excursion to Tindari	"Excursion to Tindari"	13 December 2008	N/A (Note: This episode did not feature in BBC Four's weekly top 10.)
Season 3	06	16 May 2001	"Tocco d'artista"	(Short story)	"The Artist's Touch"	17 March 2012	628,000
Season 4	07	28 October 2002	"Il senso del tatto"	(Short stories)	"The Sense of Touch"	24 March 2012	719,000
Season 4	08	4 November 2002	"Gli arancini di Montalbano"	(Short stories)	"Montalbano's Croquettes"	15 December 2008	N/A
Season 4	09	11 November 2002	"L'odore della notte"	The Scent of the Night	"The Scent of the Night"	7 April 2012	773,000
Season 4	10	18 November 2002	"Il gatto e il cardellino"	(Short stories)	"The Goldfinch and the Cat"	14 April 2012	677,000
Season 5	11	22 September 2005	"Il giro di boa"	Rounding the Mark	"Turning Point"	25 August 2012	937,000
Season 5	12	29 September 2005	"Par condicio"	(Short stories)	"Equal Time"	1 September 2012	926,000
Season 6	13	7 March 2006	"La pazienza del ragno"	The Patience of the Spider	"The Patience of the Spider"	8 September 2012	681,000
Season 6	14	13 March 2006	"Il gioco delle tre carte"	(Short stories)	"The Game of Three Cards"	15 September 2012	713,000
Season 7	15	2 November 2008	"La vampa d'agosto"	August Heat	"August Flame"	22 September 2012	790,000
Season 7	16	3 November 2008	"Le ali della sfinge"	The Wings of the Sphinx	"The Wings of the Sphinx"	29 September 2012	821,000
Season 7	17	10 November 2008	"La pista di sabbia"	The Track of Sand	"The Track of Sand"	6 October 2012	701,000
Season 7	18	17 November 2008	"La luna di carta"	The Paper Moon	"Paper Moon"	13 October 2012	810,000
Season 8	19	14 March 2011	"Il campo del vasaio"	The Potter's Field	"The Potter's Field"	3 November 2012	898,000
Season 8	20	21 March 2011	"La danza del gabbiano"	The Dance of the Seagull	"The Gull's Dance"	27 October 2012	838,000
Season 8	21	28 March 2011	"La caccia al tesoro"	The Treasure Hunt	"Treasure Hunt"	10 November 2012	874,000
Season 8	22	4 April 2011	"L'età del dubbio"	The Age of Doubt	"The Age of Doubt"	20 October 2012	867,000
Season 9	23	15 April 2013	"Il sorriso di Angelica"	Angelica's Smile	"Angelica's Smile"	19 October 2013	908,000
Season 9	24	22 April 2013	"Il gioco degli specchi"	Game of Mirrors	"Hall of Mirrors"	26 October 2013	962,000
Season 9	25	29 April 2013	"Una voce di notte"	A Voice in the Night	"A Voice in the Night"	2 November 2013	979,000
Season 9	26	6 May 2013	"Una lama di luce"	A Beam of Light	"A Ray of Light"	9 November 2013	1,083,000
Season 10	27	29 February 2016	"Una faccenda delicata"	(Short stories)	"A Delicate Matter"	19 August 2017	1,161,000
Season 10	28	7 March 2016	"La piramide di fango"	The Pyramid of Mud	"The Mud Pyramid"	26 August 2017	999,000
Season 11	29	27 February 2017	"Un covo di vipere"	A Nest of Vipers	"A Nest of Vipers"	2 September 2017	931,000
Season 11	30	6 March 2017	"Come voleva la prassi"	(Short stories)	"As Per Procedure"	9 September 2017	965,000
Season 12	31	12 February 2018	"La giostra degli scambi"	The Overnight Kidnapper	"Carousel"	19 May 2018	887,000
Season 12	32	19 February 2018	"Amore"	(Short stories)	"Love"	2 June 2018	858,000
Season 13	33	11 February 2019	"L'altro capo del filo"	The Other End of the Line	"The Other End of the Thread"	1 June 2019	917,129
Season 13	34	18 February 2019	"Un diario del '43"	(Short stories)	"A Diary from ‘43"	8 June 2019	915,845
Season 14	35	9 March 2020	"Salvo amato, Livia mia"	(Short story)	"Beloved Salvo, My Livia"	10 October 2020	1,014,022
Season 14	36	16 March 2020	"La rete di protezione"	The Safety Net	"The Safety Net"	17 October 2020	887,757
Season 15	37	8 March 2021	"Il metodo Catalanotti"	The Sicilian Method	"The Catalanotti Method"	2 July 2022	

In a 2022 interview, Luca Zingaretti said: "For me it was a wonderful professional and human adventure. Now it seems to me to have come to an end. The author no longer writes and my director friend, Alberto Sironi, is sadly gone too. Does it make sense to end the saga by filming the last two unpublished novels also as a sign of respect towards them? Or is it their very lack that suggests respectful silence? I lean towards the latter".

== Production ==
Given the success of the Andrea Camilleri novels, published by Sellerio (Palermo), RAI with Palomar, commissioned a television series, in co-operation with Sweden's public service SVT, Sveriges Television, of most of the novels and short stories. Each closely follows the plot of the novels, in some cases joining several short stories. Alberto Sironi (it), who died suddenly in early August 2019, had directed the entire series up till then. He was taken ill during the filming of three new episodes in 2019 and Luca Zingaretti took over the direction. Camilleri was teaching at the same time that Zingaretti was studying at the Accademia Nazionale di Arte Drammatica Silvio D'Amico. Luca Zingaretti had to adjust his accent to Sicilian having been born in Rome. Inspector Montalbano was initially launched on Rai 2. It moved to Rai 1 after the second series.

Austrian actress Katharina Böhm, then Lina Perned (both dubbed by Claudia Catani) and lastly Sonia Bergamasco played his girlfriend, Livia. Cesare Bocci played his deputy and Peppino Mazzotta his most trusted detective Fazio.

== Filming ==
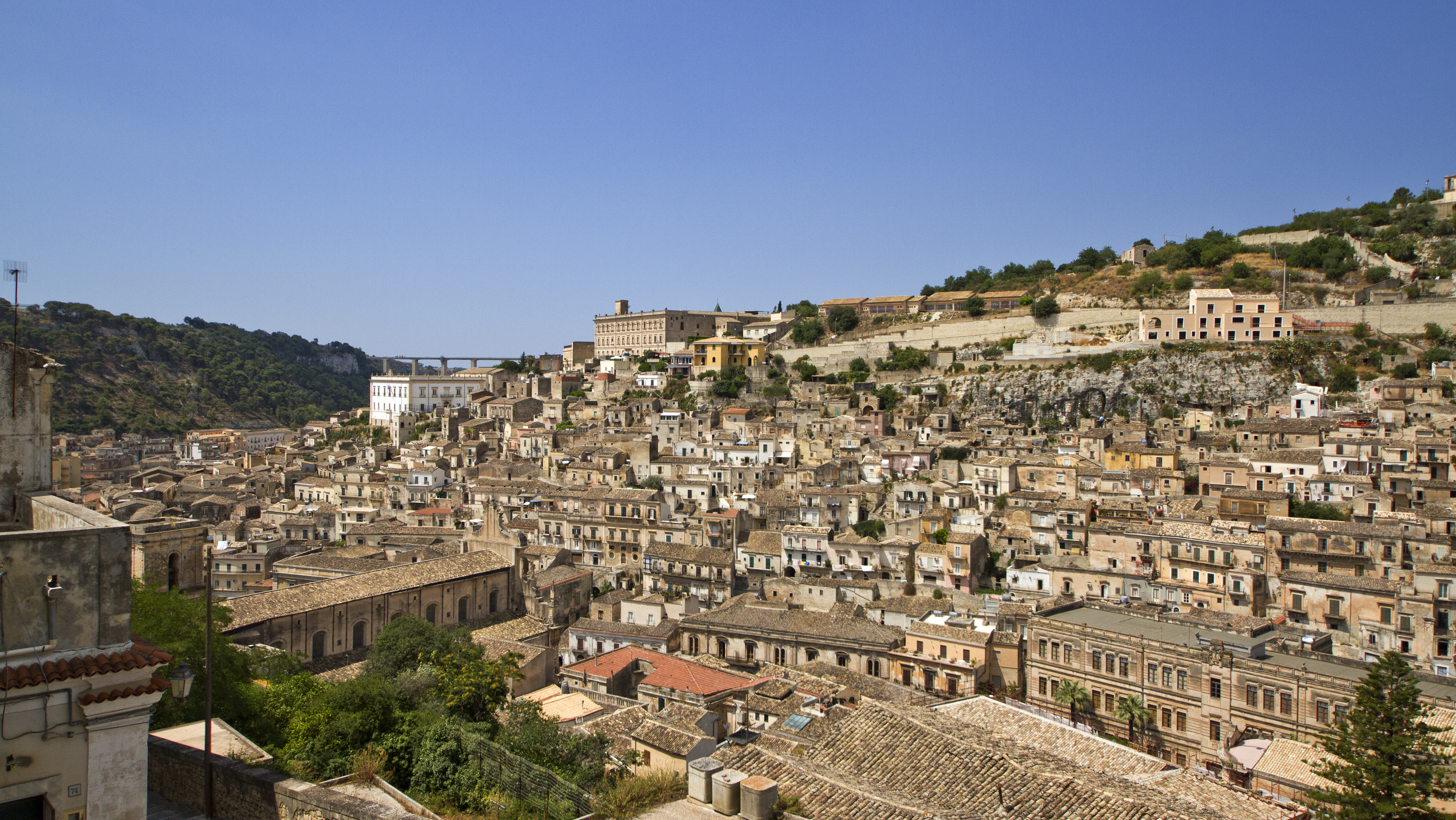
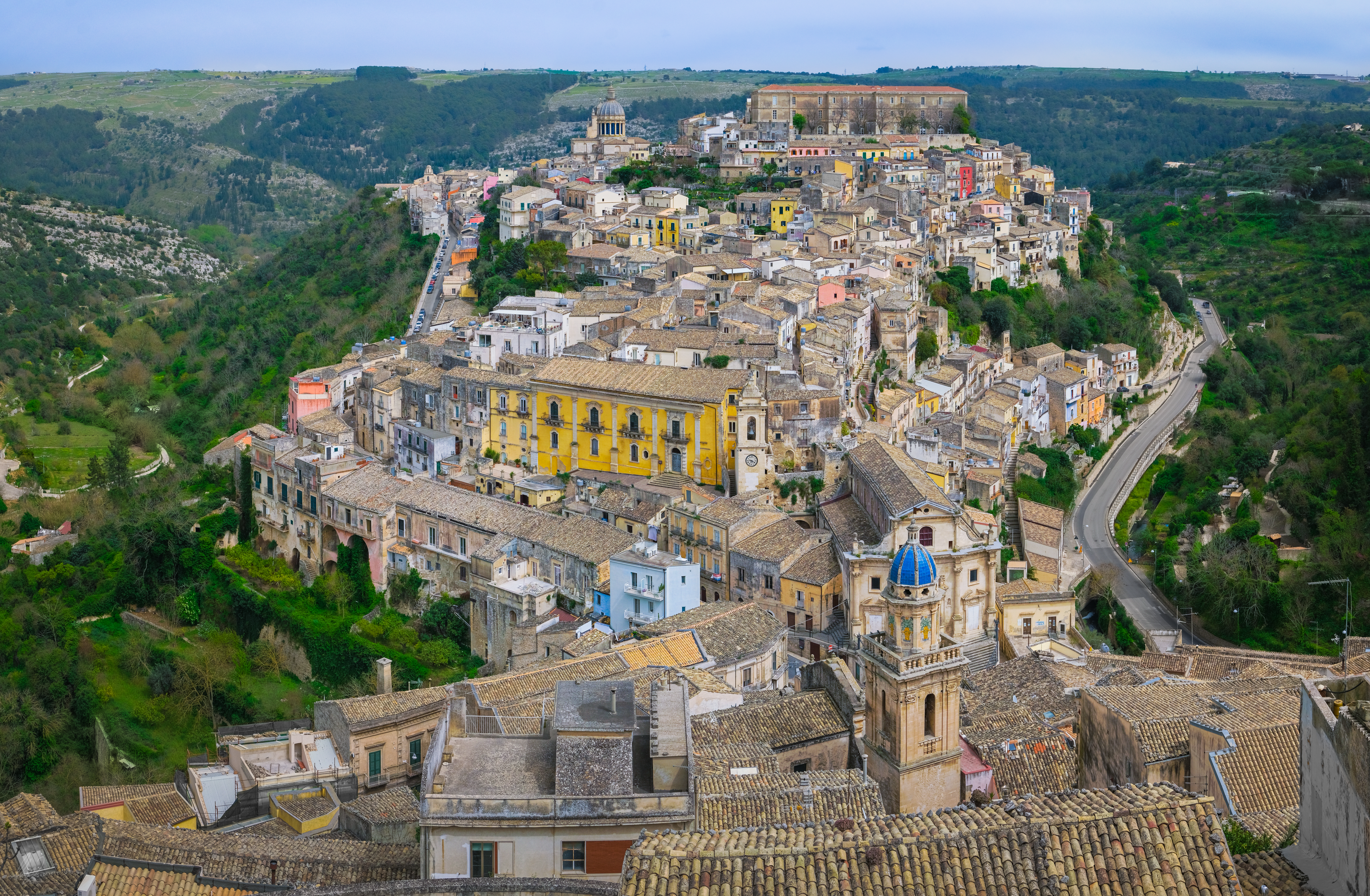
Panoramic view of Modica and Ragusa

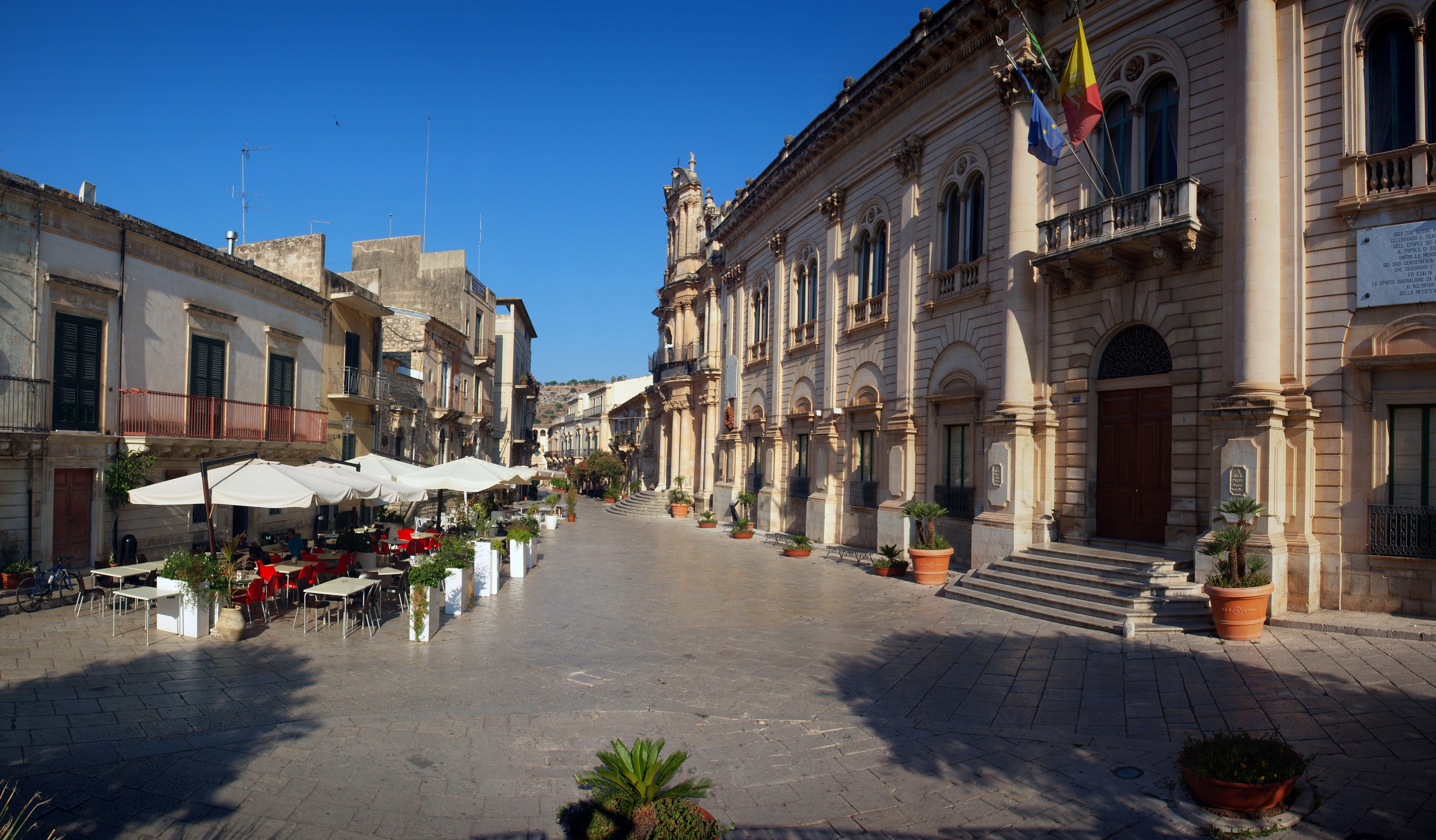
Montalbano's fictional police station is located in the City Hall of Scicli.

Although Camilleri set his books in a fictionalised province of Agrigento, much of the series is filmed in the province of Ragusa. The exteriors of la Mànnara were filmed at Fornace Penna in Sampieri. Montalbano's offices are in Scicli, as are the offices of Commissioner Bonetti-Alderighi (actually those of the mayor). Filming is in Ragusa Ibla, Modica, Donnafugata Castle and the Donnalucata, Pozzallo and Scoglitti ports, Marina di Ragusa, Comiso, Santa Croce Camerina, Sampieri, Acate, and other places in south-eastern Sicily. The opening shots in the series include the Guerrieri Viaduct in Modica. The Coast Guard office in Scoglitti, in reality, is the small lighthouse museum.

=== List of main locations ===
- Ragusa
- Punta Secca
- Modica
- Scicli
- Donnalucata
- Comiso
- Chiaramonte Gulfi
- Ispica
- Pozzallo
- Vittoria
- Scoglitti
- Sampieri
- Acate

== International transmission ==
The BBC holds the United Kingdom transmission rights. "Excursion to Tindari" and "Montalbano's Croquettes" were shown on BBC Four in December 2008. On 11 February 2012, "The Snack Thief" was broadcast in its 9 pm Saturday evening slot. On 25 August 2012, BBC Four began to broadcast a series of 12 episodes. From 19 October to 9 November 2013, the four series nine episodes were broadcast and referred to as Series 3. In June 2014, BBC Four began a re-run of all existing episodes and this time commencing in the correct running order. However the episodes (as detailed in dates above) for season 8 were shown in a different order than the Italian sequence. This remains the U.K. sequence for the BBC iPlayer stream and the U.K. DVD collection release.

In the United States, the series is retitled Detective Montalbano and streams on MHz Choice in Italian, subtitled in English by MHz staff. Also available free through many library systems via Hoopla.

In Australia, the series was shown on Special Broadcasting Service in Italian, subtitled in English by SBS staff.

In France, it was shown in winter 2013 on France 3 on Sundays with the title Commissaire Montalbano. In Spain, it was on La 2 on Saturdays in spring 2013 and in Argentina it was seen on the Europa channel.

== DVD release ==
DVD title	Discs	Production year	Episodes	DVD release Region 1
Detective Montalbano: Episodes 1–3	3	1999–2000	"The Snack Thief", "The Voice of the Violin", "The Shape of Water"	29 June 2010
Detective Montalbano: Episodes 4–6	3	2000–2001	"The Mystery of the Terracotta Dog", "The Artist's Touch", "A Trip to Tindari"	29 June 2010
Detective Montalbano: Episodes 7–9	3	2002	"The Sense of Touch", "Montalbano's Croquettes", "The Scent of the Night"	17 August 2010
Detective Montalbano: Episodes 10–12	3	2002–2005	"The Goldfinch and the Cat", "Turning Point", "Equal Time"	17 August 2010
Detective Montalbano: Episodes 13–15	3	2006–2008	"The Spider's Patience", "Find the Lady", "Paper Moon"	14 November 2010
Detective Montalbano: Episodes 16–18	3	2008	"Track of Sand", "Wings of the Sphinx", "August Heat"	14 November 2010
Detective Montalbano: Episodes 19 & 20	2	2011	"The Potter's Field" and "The Dance of the Seagull"	4 November 2011
Detective Montalbano: Episodes 21 & 22	2	2011	"The Treasure Hunt" and "The Age of Doubt"	4 November 2011
Detective Montalbano: Episodes 23 & 24	2	2013	"Angelica's Smile" and "Mirror Effect"	24 September 2013
Detective Montalbano: Episodes 25 & 26	2	2013	"A Voice in the Night" and "A Ray of Light"	24 September 2013
Detective Montalbano: Episodes 27 & 28	2	2016	"A Delicate Matter" and "The Mud Pyramid"	28 June 2016
Detective Montalbano: Episodes 29 & 30	2	2017	"A Nest of Vipers" and "As Per Procedure"	27 June 2017
Detective Montalbano: Episodes 31 & 32	2	2018	"Merry-go-round" and "Amore"	26 June 2018
Detective Montalbano: Episodes 33 & 34	2	2019	"The Other End of the Thread" and "A Diary from ‘43"	25 June 2019
Detective Montalbano: Episodes 35 & 36	2	2020	"Dear Livia" and "The Safety Net"	23 June 2020

MHz Networks distributes the Detective Montalbano series on TV, DVD, TVOD and SVOD.

In the UK, the earlier episodes are currently available in both a collection and series format, with the series numbering following BBC Four's. These titles are distributed by Acorn Media UK.

DVD title	Discs	Year	Episodes	DVD release
DVD title	Discs	Year	Episodes	Region 2
Collection One	2	2012	"The Snack Thief", "The Voice of The Violin", "The Shape of Water", "The Mystery of The Terracotta Dog"	5 March 2012
Collection Two	3	2012	"Excursion to Tindari", "The Artist's Touch", "The Sense of Touch", "Montalbano's Croquettes", "The Scent of the Night", "The Cat and the Goldfinch"	3 September 2012
Complete Series One	5	2012	The 10 episodes from Collection One and Collection Two	8 October 2012
Collection Three	2	2013	"Turning Point", "Equal Time", "The Spider’s Patience", "Find the Lady"	7 January 2013
Collection Four	2	2013	"August Flame", "The Wings of the Sphinx", "Track of Sand", "Paper Moon"	4 March 2013
Collection Five	2	2013	"The Age of Doubt", "The Gull's Dance", "The Potter's Field", "Treasure Hunt"	8 July 2013
Complete Series Two	6	2013	The 12 episodes from Collections Three, Four and Five	4 November 2013
Collection Six	2	2014	"Angelica's Smile", "Hall of Mirrors", "A Voice in the Night", "A Ray of Light"	3 February 2014
The Complete Montalbano Collection	13	2014	All 26 episodes from the six collections	2 June 2014
Collection Seven	2	2017	"A Delicate Matter", "The Mud Pyramid", "A Nest of Vipers", "As Per Procedure"	11 September 2017
Collection Eight	1	2018	"Carousel", "Love"	4 June 2018
Collection Nine	1	2019	"The Other End of the Thread", "A Diary from ‘43"	1 July 2019
Inspector Montalbano Complete 1-9	17	2019	All 34 episodes from the nine collections	31 December 2019
Collection Ten	1	2020	"Beloved Salvo, My Livia" and "The Safety Net"	23 November 2020
Inspector Montalbano Complete 1-10	18	2020	All 36 episodes from the ten collections	23 November 2020

In Australia the entire series has been released in Italian with English subtitles by HiGloss Entertainment in twelve individual volumes, with the first three volumes each containing episodes from multiple seasons. An eleven-disc set, titled Inspector Montalbano 1999-2011, has also been released, containing the first 20 episodes and comprising the discs from the first four individual volumes and one disc from the fifth. Some episodes are arranged differently to the original running order and some have different titles.

DVD title	Discs	Production year	Episodes	DVD release Region 4
Inspector Montalbano Volume 1	3	1999–2001	"The Snack Thief", "The Voice of the Violin", "The Shape of Water", "The Mystery of the Terracotta Dog", "The Artist's Touch"	
Inspector Montalbano Volume 2	3	2001–2002	"A Trip to Tindari", "The Sense of Touch", "Montalbano's Croquettes", "The Scent of the Night", "The Goldfinch and the Cat"	
Inspector Montalbano Volume 3	2	2005–2006	"Turning Point", "Equal Time", "Find the Lady", "The Spider's Patience"	
Inspector Montalbano Volume 4	2	2008	"August Flame", "The Wings of the Sphinx", "The Track of Sand", "Paper Moon"	
Inspector Montalbano Volume 5	2	2011	"The Potter's Field", "The Gull's Dance", "The Treasure Hunt", "The Age of Doubt"	
Inspector Montalbano Volume 6	2	2013	"Angelica's Smile", "Mirror Effect", "A Voice in the Night", "A Ray of Light"	
Inspector Montalbano Volume 7	2	2016	"A Delicate Matter" and "The Mud Pyramid"	
Inspector Montalbano Volume 8	2	2017	"A Nest of Vipers" and "According to Procedure"	
Inspector Montalbano Volume 9	2	2018	"Amore" and "Merry-go-round"	
Inspector Montalbano Volume 10	2	2019	"The Other End of the Line" and "A Diary from 1943"	
Inspector Montalbano Volume 11	2	2020	"My Beloved Livia" and "The Safety Net"	
Inspector Montalbano Volume 12	1	2021	"The Catalanotti Method"	

In the Nordic countries the first 18 films are available as Box 1 (1–6), Box 2 (7–12) and Box 3 (13–18). All were released in 2009 (labelled 1999, the start date of the series) with Danish, Finnish, Norwegian and Swedish subtitles. They were released by AtlanticFilms AB on license from RAI Trade.

In Spain, there is a confusing situation where episodes are dubbed in Spanish, as well as Italian with Spanish subtitles being available in both box sets containing six episodes each and overlapping mini box sets containing two films each. Both are labelled, Colección Montalbano in identical boxes just to add to the confusion. Distribution is by Track Media SL.

== Awards ==
- 2003 Busto Arsizio Film Festival: Winner Best TV Series
- 2009 Kineo Awards, Italy: Winner Best Television Film
- 2011 Kineo Awards, Italy: Winner Best Television Film
- 2014 Crime Thriller Awards, UK: Nominee Best International TV Drama
- 2016 TV Award - TV Direction Award: Winner Best fiction

== See also ==
- List of Italian television series
- List of police television dramas
