= List of Inspector Montalbano episodes =

Inspector Montalbano is an Italian police procedural television series. Since 6 May 1999, 37 original episodes have been produced and broadcast by RAI.

== Preview ==
Series	Episodes	Originally released	
Series	Episodes	First released	Last released
1	2	6 May 1999	13 May 1999
2	2	2 May 2000	9 May 2000
3	2	9 May 2001	16 May 2001
4	4	28 October 2002	18 November 2002
5	2	22 September 2005	29 September 2005
6	2	7 March 2006	13 March 2006
7	4	2 November 2008	17 November 2008
8	4	14 March 2011	4 April 2011
9	4	15 April 2013	6 May 2013
10	2	29 February 2016	7 March 2016
11	2	27 February 2017	6 March 2017
12	2	12 February 2018	19 February 2018
13	2	11 February 2019	18 February 2019
14	2	9 March 2020	16 March 2020

== Episodes ==
=== Season 1 (1999) ===
No. overall	No. in series	Title	Directed by	Written by	Original release date
1	1	"The Snack Thief"	Alberto Sironi	Andrea Camilleri & Francesco Bruni	6 May 1999
Salvo Montalbano investigates the murder of Lapecora, a middle-aged accountant, found stabbed in the back in the lift of the building where he lived. Under questioning, the victim's widow bitterly accuses her husband's mistress, a beautiful Tunisian woman named Kherima, who vanished on the day of the murder, taking with her François, her six-year-old son. Kherima is pursued by gangsters and ultimately murdered, but helps her son escape. Montalbano discovers that the boy has survived on his own for several days by stealing snacks from other children at his school. Montalbano brings François to his home, where Montalbano's girlfriend Livia looks after him; she wants to adopt the child. Montalbano continues with his investigation; finds that Kherima had been mixed up in international intrigue with the knowledge of the Italian secret services represented by the figure of Colonel Lohengrin Pera. Montalbano decides it is time to propose to Livia so they can adopt and jointly raise François.
2	2	"The Voice of the Violin"	Alberto Sironi	Andrea Camilleri & Angelo Pasquini	13 May 1999
The episode opens with Montalbano's discovery, in an abandoned villa, of the naked body of Michela Licalzi, a young woman who was married to a wealthy and complaisant older man. Michela has been strangled during sex; near her body is a violin case. It turns out that she had owned a priceless Guarnieri del Gesù violin. Montalbano questions Michela's husband and her closest friend, Anna, a local school teacher, who takes a fancy to Montalbano. He discovers that Michela's lover was an antiques dealer from Bologna who is in financial difficulties because of his gambling problem. Montalbano and Livia go to the home Francois (their potential adoptee) has been living, to be safe, and learn that Francois does not want to leave with them and be adopted by them because he has become so attached to the temporary family and their children. This ends the planned marriage of Montalbano/Livia.

=== Season 2 (2000) ===
No. overall	No. in series	Title	Directed by	Written by	Original release date
3	1	"The Shape of Water"	Alberto Sironi	Andrea Camilleri & Francesco Bruni	2 May 2000
In the Mánnara, an abandoned industrial site that serves as a dump and a hangout for sex workers, two sweepers find the barely clothed body of the Sicilian politician Luparello in his car; he apparently dead died from a heart attack in compromising circumstances with a prostitute. Montalbano decides not to close the case, but investigates further. One of the sweepers alerts Rizzo, Lupparello's lawyer and best friend, who merely advises the men to call the police. In the meantime, one of the men finds a valuable gold necklace. Although the authorities publicly pronounce Luparello's death to be from "natural causes", Montalbano questions the victim's widow and Rizzo; the latter implicates Ingrid Sjostrom, a Swedish former racing driver. It was Ingrid's necklace that was found at the dump, and Rizzo claims she is a depraved woman who would have relished a sexual encounter at a place like the Mánnara. However, Ingrid informs Montalbano that Luparello was not attracted to women; it is found that he had been having an affair with his own nephew, Giorgio, a fragile young man suffering from epilepsy. It transpires that Luparello actually died of a heart attack in bed with Giorgio, and Rizzo told Giorgio he would move the body somewhere less embarrassing. Instead, Rizzo set up the scene at the Mánnara to further damage Luparello's reputation, implicate Ingrid and her family in the death, and blackmail Giorgio. The episode ends with Giorgio killing Rizzo in revenge before committing suicide.
4	2	"The Mystery of the Terracotta Dog"	Alberto Sironi	Andrea Camilleri & Francesco Bruni	9 May 2000
Inspector Montalbano's men stage the arrest of the elderly Mafia boss Tanu 'u Greco, who has confided to Montalbano that he wished to take refuge in prison because he was repelled by the violent ways of the new, international Mafia that no longer adheres to the older codes of "the honoured society". The Mafia shoot Tanu to prevent him from revealing their secrets. Before dying, Tanu has revealed the existence of a wartime arsenal hidden in a cave. There Montalbano discovers the tomb of two skeletons embracing each other. They are guarded by a large terracotta dog, and next to them is a saucer with coins. When forensic examination reveals that the skeletons met a violent end, Montalbano decides to investigate even though the deaths occurred fifty years previously. Montalbano's friend, the elderly school principal Burgio, tells Montalbano that the cave and surrounding land belonged to the family of his school friend, Lillo Rizzitano. The Rizzitanos were a violent family, but Lillo was a bookish and gentle youth who was repelled by the behaviour of his own family. Now an elderly professor, Lillo returns to Vigata and reveals to Montalbano how, during World War II, his teenage cousin Lisetta had fallen in love with Mario, a young soldier from the North. Lisetta took refuge with Lillo to escape the abuse of her father (Lillo's uncle), who had been molesting her. The father hired an assassin who found the pair together and killed them, and Lillo in turn killed the assassin. He then placed the bodies of the two lovers in the cave with the dog and bowl of coins in accordance with the formula of an Arab folk legend of two doomed young lovers.

=== Season 3 (2001) ===
No. overall	No. in series	Title	Directed by	Written by	Original release date
5	1	"Excursion to Tindari"	Alberto Sironi	Andrea Camilleri & Francesco Bruni	9 May 2001
Inspector Montalbano is sought out by a distraught man who is unable to contact his retired elderly parents. The last time they had been seen was on a tour bus they had taken to visit the town of Tindari. During the trip, they been stand-offish and had behaved strangely, requesting several stops on the return trip. On the same day as the disappearance of the couple, the body of a young man is found in front of the apartment building where the old couple had lived. He had been shot at close range in the forehead. The victim, Nenè Sanfilippo, did unspecified work at home via computer for which he was being well paid; he had two new cars and his apartment is filled with expensive electronic goods, as well as a large stash of what appear to be homemade pornographic videos. Officer Catarella inspects the contents of Sanfilippo's computer and discovers that he documented his sexual exploits; Catarella also finds the draft of what appears to be an unfinished science fiction novel. Montalbano's friend Ingrid Sjostrom recognises the woman in the videos as the Romanian wife of a noted surgeon, known locally as "The Transplant King", whose patients come to him by helicopter. The plot of the science fiction novel concerns robots and robot "part" transplants and seems to hint at organ trafficking. Montalbano discovers that Sanfilippo had recently rented and remodelled an outbuilding on land belonging to the missing couple. It turns out that during the last stop on their return from Tindari, the couple had been murdered in order to silence them.
6	2	"The Artist's Touch"	Alberto Sironi	Andrea Camilleri & Francesco Bruni	16 May 2001
Alberto Larussa has committed suicide in his laboratory inside his home, and Galluzzo is the first officeron the scene. Later that night, an electrician, Ignazio Cucchiara, is found murdered in Vigata, and the case is handled by Mimì Augello, Montalbano's second-in-command. Speaking first with her friend Anna Tropeano, who found the body, and then with the Larussa's cleaner, Maria Antonietta Vullo, he discovers that Larussa was paralysed after falling from a horse. The insomniac Filippo Alaimo, a friend of Alberto, claims he saw a car being driven away from the house late on the night of the death. When Livia arrives at the funeral, Montalbano realizes that the death was not the victim's way of behaving. He manages to get an extra day to investigate from the deputy prosecutor Lo Bianco. Thanks to a new search of the house, he finds part of a photo album, as well as a gun and a holographic will, whose sole beneficiary is the brother James; the car that was heard leaving Alberto's place is also traced to James. After a handwriting expert proves the will is false, James is arrested, but declares himself innocent. Shortly after a witness, Angela Bonocore, claims to have heard a violent quarrel coming from the house of Larussa. Further confirmation comes from his friend Anna, who had found the body, that her aunt had seen a car go dark just before two o'clock in the morning at the neighbor's house. It turns out that Larussa had not actually fallen from a horse, but was paralysed after falling down stairs and his father concocted the story of falling from a horse to protect the younger son. After 31 years, Alberto decided to see revenge on his younger brother for the accident by faking his own suicide and framing his brother in a fake will.

=== Season 4 (2002) ===
No. overall	No. in series	Title	Directed by	Written by	Original release date
7	1	"The Sense of Touch"	Alberto Sironi	Andrea Camilleri & Francesco Bruni & Salvatore De Mola	28 October 2002
Montalbano investigates the death of Enea Silvio Piccolomini, a blind gentleman who died from an overdose of the medication he was taking. The story has unexpected consequences. With Livia and Orlando, the big dog of the Piccolomini, Montalbano goes to the island of Levanzo under the guise of a short break, but in actual fact, travels to speak to the sister of the Piccolomini who runs an inn there. The holiday soon becomes the opportunity for further research. He finds out that the charity for the elderly and disabled where Piccolomini was residing, was just a cover for the illegal transportation of drugs, which were cleverly hidden in the walking stick that the old man carried, and that the dog Orlando had been trained to attack the sniffer dogs who would have detected the drugs, but were deterred from approaching the old man and let him pass undisturbed onto the ferry.
8	2	"Montalbano's Croquettes"	Alberto Sironi	Andrea Camilleri & Francesco Bruni & Salvatore De Mola	4 November 2002
Montalbano is receiving invitations from all over for the New Year's Eve big dinner. He does not want to go to Paris with Livia. He has an invitation from Adelina to celebrate the end of the year with her. The investigation concerns the death which was made to look like an accident of Mr and Mrs. Pagnozzi, when their car is discovered having fallen into a ravine. The Commissioner will resolve the case with the help of Pasquale, one of Adelina's children, who in the meantime was sent back to prison for a theft (he committed) in the villa of the couple who had died in the accident: the culprit is Calogero Picone, called Gerry, the deceased man's illegitimate child from a relationship with the beautiful maid. He had always hated his father, his wife and the Pagnozzi's son who took the place which he thought belonged to him and to his mother who instead led a life of hardship. Having solved the case, the Commissioner will have Pasquale temporarily released to accompany him so he can attend the year-end party and therefore have the opportunity to savour the delicious croquettes made by Adelina.
9	3	"The Scent of the Night"	Alberto Sironi	Andrea Camilleri & Francesco Bruni & Salvatore De Mola	11 November 2002
The accountant Gargano has disappeared and with him all the money that many citizens of Vigata had given him in the hope that he would invest it productively. Together with a young man, Giacomo Pellegrino, who helped him in the business, he has left no trace. The Commissioner can count on two women who worked with the accountant Gargano; the first is a student who had sensed that something was not right, the other is the secretary of the accountant and is convinced of the innocence of the accountant. Montalbano, after numerous clues, find that the accountant Gargano after stealing money and killing his partner went to the house of his secretary, who, feeling sorry for him because he was having a severe mental breakdown after doing what he did, and to spare him suffering, killed him. Montalbano finds his decaying body in a bedroom where his lover put him after shooting him while he slept.
10	4	"The Goldfinch and the Cat"	Alberto Sironi	Andrea Camilleri & Francesco Bruni & Salvatore De Mola	18 November 2002
In Vigàta within a few days, three old ladies are attacked by a thief on a motorcycle with a helmet. He shoots but never manages to kill. Montalbano find that only blanks had been fired, but these events create precedents for the murder of a rich woman, Mrs Joppolo, later on. This victim loved her cat and her goldfinch very much, thanks to which the Commissioner finds out what really happened. During the investigation, the deputy commissioner Augello appears only sporadically because he busy with his marriage preparations, and was temporarily replaced by Barbara, a childhood friend of Montalbano, who has just won the police contest. She brings a little turmoil to the police station because she is very beautiful and all three men (Augello, Fazio and Montalbano) are attracted to her. Fazio then falls in love immediately, but did not dare to tell her how he truly feels. All together, they investigate the alleged disappearance of Dr. Landolina, and they save the pregnant Mariuccia from the clutches of her father who was ashamed of her. At the completion of the investigation, Montalbano and Augello spend the evening celebrating the end of Augello's life as a bachelor, and Fazio plucks up the courage to invite Barbara to go out with him on a date.

=== Season 5 (2005) ===
No. overall	No. in series	Title	Directed by	Written by	Original release date
11	1	"Turning Point"	Alberto Sironi	Andrea Camilleri & Francesco Bruni & Salvatore De Mola	22 September 2005
The Commissioner is going through an unhappy point in his life, disturbed by the news coming from Genoa, and is even thinking of resigning from the police force. During his daily morning swim, he finds an unidentified corpse and begins an investigation as to the identity of the deceased. During the search, he is present at the arrival of a boat of illegal immigrants among whom, there is a child who reminds him so much of François. A few days later, he discovers that the child has died, and he could certainly have spared him this tragic end, since he had noticed the resistance that the child felt toward the "mother". At the end of the episode, Montalbano and his team manage to dismantle the network of human trafficking which dealt with body parts for wealthy clients in need of organ transplants. The inspector, who finds the place where the children are taken, kills the perpetrators in disgust before any of the latest arrivals were injured. Montalbano is injured in the crossfire, but is saved by police colleagues who were on the scene.
12	2	"Equal Time"	Alberto Sironi	Andrea Camilleri & Francesco Bruni & Salvatore De Mola	29 September 2005
The Commissioner on the one hand tries to manage the worsening relations between two major Mafia families of Vigata (Cuffaro and Sinagra), and on the other is engaged in the search for a foreign girl; and the trail leads into the Sicilian countryside, and to an abandoned railway station located Biagio, where a mentally disabled person confesses to having delivered the girl to a dangerous criminal involved in the white slave trade. Having been found, Montalbano discovers that the mafia war that erupted between the families is not due to issues of succession to power, but because the young foreigner having fallen in love, reciprocated, with the husband of the daughter of one of the gang leaders which unleash jealousy and then the physical elimination.

=== Season 6 (2006) ===
No. overall	No. in series	Title	Directed by	Written by	Original release date
13	1	"The Patience of the Spider"	Alberto Sironi	Andrea Camilleri & Francesco Bruni & Salvatore De Mola	7 March 2006
On a road outside Vigata lies the abandoned scooter of a girl, Susanna Mistretta, who was going through a difficult time because of her terminally ill mother's depression. Montalbano finds her boyfriend Francesco to be a great help in uncovering the truth behind the apparent kidnapping. The enlargement of a photo sent by the kidnappers and the statement of a woman forced into prostitution to pay for the treatment of her disabled husband enable Montalbano to discover that the kidnapping was a hoax, planned by the girl herself and her uncle who had been in love with Susanna's mother. The uncle wished to economically and politically ruin his sister-in-law’s brother, Susanna's uncle, because of his role in the mother's depression.
14	2	"Find the Lady / The Game of Three Cards"	Alberto Sironi	Andrea Camilleri & Francesco Bruni & Salvatore De Mola	13 March 2006
An old foreman is killed, hit by a car. Montalbano learns that the foreman's former co-worker was a young building contractor who, twenty years earlier, had been accused and convicted of the murder of his partner, with whose wife he was having an affair. The convicted murderer had been released from prison a few weeks before. Meanwhile, a mysterious stranger is found murdered by a gunshot in the back of his head, not far from an isolated farmhouse. Montalbano begins to suspect a link between the death of the master builder and his partner's release. It is eventually revealed that the mysterious stranger is involved in the incident.

=== Season 7 (2008) ===
No. overall	No. in series	Title	Directed by	Written by	Original release date
15	1	"August Flame"	Alberto Sironi	Andrea Camilleri & Francesco Bruni & Salvatore De Mola	2 November 2008
On a hot August day, Inspector Montalbano is eating lunch at a beach villa rented by his deputy, Augello, for holidays in Montereale Marina. During lunch, Augello's young son Salvo cannot be found; Montalbano searches for him and finds him in a tunnel in the garden, where he also discovers the corpse of a girl named Rina who disappeared six years earlier. Montalbano begins investigations with the help of the victim's twin sister, Adriana (who tries to seduce him), to find out who killed her sister.
16	2	"The Wings of the Sphinx"	Alberto Sironi	Andrea Camilleri & Francesco Bruni & Salvatore De Mola	3 November 2008
Montalbano's relationship with his girlfriend Livia is going through a rough time. One morning he is called to a beach where the body of a naked girl has been found, her face devastated by a bullet.A butterfly tattooed on the shoulder could aid identification. Montalbano finds the case nags at him because there are other girls with the same tattoo on the shoulder, all from Eastern Europe, who have found work and help through the Catholic Association "Goodwill", which saved them from a fate of prostitution. While the inquiry continues, the Commissioner is under pressure from all sides: from the bishop, who does not want shadows cast on Goodwill, the local Prosecutor who does not want to displease the bishop, and Livia, who wants to leave him in order to "find herself".
17	3	"The Track of Sand"	Alberto Sironi	Andrea Camilleri & Francesco Bruni & Salvatore De Mola	10 November 2008
Montalbano opens the shutters of his room one morning to find the bloody corpse of a horse on the shore. The commissioner has no sooner summoned his men to help than the horse disappears: All that remains, the impression of his body on the sand and one of his horseshoes that the commissioner has put in the pocket of his bathrobe. That same day a "foreigner", Rachele Estermann, notifies Vigàta's commissioner of the theft of her horse while in the stables of Saverio Lo Duca, one of the richest men in Sicily; another thoroughbred has vanished into thin air. The scenario of the story is the world of underground races, the favourite pastime of a certain landed aristocracy that bets heavily. It is in this golden environment that Montalbano has to investigate, because after the horse vanishes, a guard of the stables is also found murdered. Among the butlers in livery, Montalbano's barons and queens are a bit uncomfortable, while "an unknown person" breaks into Montalbano's house at Marinella three times: they do not steal anything but turn everything upside down, they seem to be looking for something. But what? Montalbano does not remain insensitive to the "foreigner's" advances, but in the end succeeds in passing her off onto his deputy Mimi Augello, always vulnerable to feminine charms.
18	4	"Paper Moon"	Alberto Sironi	Andrea Camilleri & Francesco Bruni & Salvatore De Mola	17 November 2008
A ruthless crime in a suburb of Vigata. Angelo Pardo, a doctor, was found shot in the forehead. Everything seems to point to a crime of passion. He was involved in clandestine abortions and drug smuggling with one of the local mafiosa families. Montalbano is confronted by two passionate women; Michela Pardo who was morbidly attached to her brother and full of anger toward Elena Scalani, ex-lover of Pardo who had grown tired of the relationship. Elena is also an addict; he investigates her, but she does nothing at all to clear herself of blame. Some of her letters were found in which she reveals her jealousy to Angelo even if she had written these under his dictation with the intention of making his sister stop opposing his relationship with Elena. Montalbano pulls the strings together to solve the crime.

=== Season 8 (2011) ===
No. overall	No. in series	Title	Directed by	Written by	Original release date
19	1	"The Potter's Field"	Alberto Sironi	Andrea Camilleri & Francesco Bruni & Salvatore De Mola	14 March 2011
This time Commissioner Montalbano wakes up not the usual Catarella, but an insistent knock on the door. Montalbano, enraged by the interrupted sleep, cannot find his clothes and goes to open in his pajamas, finding himself in front of the commissioner Bonetti-Alderighi who, desperate and crying, asks to be hidden. Montalbano is convinced that the commissioner must have gone mad all the more when he announces that the mafia has taken political power with Salvatore Riinahe became chairman of the board proposing the office of interior minister in Montalbano. The inspector, who is dreaming, is terrified when Catarella appears and threatens to shoot him if he accepts the boss's proposal: "Yes, doctors, tell us yes to this cops I will kill you pirate pirsonally". Speaking, however, Catarella got distracted and Riina took advantage of it to shoot him a shot. In reality it is not a gunshot but the sound of the shutters beaten by the wind that wakes Montalbano. The commissioner will gradually return to sleep which will be interrupted once again by a continuous ringing of the doorbell on the front door. This time it is Catarella who announces the usual finding of a dead man to the commissioner. Under an incessant flood and between various curses, the commissioner and his men, including a convinced Mimì Augello, will be able to recover a corpse torn to pieces and buried in a farmer's field. Complicating the investigation is the strange behavior of Mimì Augello, Montalbano's deputy, who has become grumpy and quarrelsome, who is embittering everyone's life in the Vigata police station. The commissioner also discovers that Mimi is lying to his wife saying he is engaged in actions that keep him busy all night and instructs his Swedish friend Ingrid to stalk him to find out what he is up to. The investigation, already complicated by the impossibility of identifying the body found, becomes even more intricate due to the reporting by the beautiful Dolores of the disappearance of her husband, a maritime officer, related to the mafia family of Balduccio Sinagra. It will be discovered that Dolores is Mimì's lover and is the cause of his change. Montalbano discovers that the dead of the Critaro is Dolores' husband, Giovanni Alfano. Thanks to the investigation it will be discovered that he was killed by his wife and lover Pecorini
20	2	"The Gull's Dance"	Alberto Sironi	Andrea Camilleri & Francesco Bruni & Salvatore De Mola	21 March 2011
A disillusioned Montalbano, who got up early in the morning, witnessed the death of a seagull on the beach, noting that the agony resembles a dance. But time is running out and Montalbano goes to the police station, where the owner of some Vigata fishing boats shows up in his office, telling him "to suspect" that two of his fishing boats are involved in drug trafficking. Montalbano promises him that he will investigate and, as soon as the man is dismissed, he is joined by the father of Inspector Fazio to find out about his son, who has not shown up at their appointment. In fact, Fazio should have accompanied his father to make some analyzes, but from the evening before, after receiving a phone call from Montalbano asking for his presence at the port, he no longer gave news of himself and his cell phone was turned off. Except, realizing that something is wrong, since he did not call the policeman the night before, he lies to his father, saying that he sent him on a private mission and that he will see him again soon. The father, reassured, leaves the office, while Salvo calls Mimi and informs him of Fazio's disappearance. (For the commissioner, Fazio was probably following a private investigation that nobody was aware of and something must have gone wrong.) Montalbano and Mimì, after going to the port, receive a tip that reveals that Inspector Fazio was last seen on Mount Scibetta, near a well, in the company of some people. Fearing the worst, Montalbano and Mimì climb Mount Scibetta and, having opened the well, find two corpses, but not the inspector, who will be found shortly after inside a cave, injured and frightened. L' Inspector, after being transported to the hospital, reveals to the commissioner that he went to the port to meet his childhood friend, Filippo Manzella, who had revelations to do. But once he arrived, he was surrounded and taken to Mount Scibetta by a group of people, who tried unsuccessfully to throw it into the well. Montalbano, after discovering that Manzella was one of the two corpses found in the well, realizes that he could not have warned Fazio, and for this very reason he investigates the life of man, finding in his apartment a letter addressed to himself, that Manzella, feeling threatened and thinking he could end badly, had left him. In that letter Manzella reveals that he discovered, with his telescope, a traffic of weapons at the port, led by Franco Sinagra, who was also the partner, violent and very jealous, of the transsexual Giovanna, who he also frequented regularly. Montalbano, discovering this, manages to obtain from the PM Tommaseo the search warrant for the house in Sinagra, where he arrests the man, after having found the evidence that frames him: the Manzella telescope.
21	3	"Treasure Hunt"	Alberto Sironi	Andrea Camilleri & Francesco Bruni & Salvatore De Mola	28 March 2011
There is nothing to do in the Vigata police station. Catarella is hopelessly committed to solving crossword puzzles and rebus and Montalbano reads a novel by Simenon when he is unexpectedly forced to play the Bruce Willis partin an American movie. In an old building inhabited by two elderly bigots, the brothers Gregorio and Caterina Palmisano, whose religious obsessions have now reached the height of madness, the hallucinated old man started to shoot from the window and Montalbano, to challenge his feeling old, climbing dangerously up a firefighter ladder manages to make the old fool harmless. In the dilapidated building, in a forest of crucifixes of every workmanship illuminated by countless lights, Montalbano believes he has discovered a young woman killed but realizes that it is a worn out inflatable dollnow battered by prolonged use, without an eye and with a hole repaired at best. Once the two brothers are hospitalized, inertia seems to have returned to the Vigata police station when news of a corpse found in a dumpster arrives. It is not the body of a victim but of another doll identical to that found in the palace of the Palmisano brothers. In those same days the commissioner receives a strange anonymous letter where he is challenged with riddles in verse to a treasure hunt that out of curiosity and because he has nothing else to do accepts. After two or three clues the suspicion arises that the game hides something dangerous and crazy. Unfortunately his "cop" nose doesn't fool him.
22	4	"The Age of Doubt"	Alberto Sironi	Andrea Camilleri & Francesco Bruni & Salvatore De Mola	4 April 2011
Commissioner Montalbano has a tragic and ridiculous dream that reveals how the two fixed thoughts of the last few years accompany him also in his sleep: the idea of death and his relationship with Livia. In the dream his funeral is taking place and that Catarella himself, who is usually entrusted with this funeral communication of the killed dead, is to be announced. The funeral ceremony is attended by the usual secondaries of the police investigations: Dr. Pasquano who as usual refuses to give details on the dead before performing an autopsy, the commissioner Bonetti-Alderighi who does not authorize Montalbano to investigate his own death, his friend Mimì Augello. They are all there but the one who should be present at the funeral is missing: his fiancée Livia who, reached by telephone by the annoyed deceased, announces that he may not be able to intervene in time and that, to be honest, he will take advantage of his death, of this unique opportunity, to feel free from a relationship that dragged on wearily. The loud noise that wakes Montalbano is caused by the storm that agitates the sea until it touches the terrace of his house. The sea and the port of Vigata now become the protagonists in the background of the new survey of Montalbano which concerns two boats moored alongside each other: a powerful motorboat and the "Vanna", a luxurious yacht whose crew found a boat at sea with a man who died of poisoning on board. Montalbano suspicious will ask for the collaboration of the investigations of an officer of the harbor master : Laura, a beautiful and intelligent young woman who will lose the compass to the commissioner who will fall in love, fortunately and unexpectedly in love, like a passionate and jealous teenager struck by the classic love at first sight.

=== Season 9 (2013) ===
No. overall	No. in series	Title	Directed by	Written by	Original release date
23	1	"Angelica's Smile"	Alberto Sironi	Andrea Camilleri & Francesco Bruni & Salvatore De Mola	15 April 2013
One night a wealthy couple, Carlo and Caterina Peritore, have both their town house and their holiday home burgled, after having been knocked out by gas. Montalbano connects this to another similar theft suffered by another couple, the Lojaconos. It turns out that the couples are acquaintances and part of a circle of friends who could all be potential victims. The robberies continue and this time the victim is Angelica Cosulich, who has recently returned to Vigata to work at a local bank. She is attracted to Montalbano, who at first resists her, but eventually succumbs to her blatant advances. The commissioner and his colleagues draw up a list of possible future victims, but while they are guarding the house of one of them, shots are fired and the thieves escape. The next theft is from the safe of a jeweller named Pierrera, who is later found dead, having committed suicide. It turns out that he is a loan shark and what have been stolen are papers referring to his business dealings. It turns out that Angelica’s parents, who died several years earlier, were being blackmailed by Pierrera, and it is she and her cousin who have instigated the other thefts to cover up this last and most important one, which they hope will prove his criminal activities. Montalbano warns Angelica that she is in danger from the other members of the gang, but he arrives too late to save her from being shot and killed.
24	2	"Hall of Mirrors"	Alberto Sironi	Andrea Camilleri & Francesco Bruni & Salvatore De Mola	22 April 2013
When a bomb goes off in front of an empty warehouse, the police think it is some sort of warning, and Montalbano turns his attention to the tenants of a nearby building. One of them is a member of the Sinagra clan and the other is Stefano Tallarita who is serving a sentence for drug dealing. Montalbano realises that the target of the attack could be Stefano's son, Arturo Tallarita in retaliation for the rumours that his father has been collaborating with the police. Then a second bomb goes off outside another empty warehouse. Meanwhile Montalbano comes to the rescue of his neighbour, Liliana Lombardo, whose car has been vandalised and he offers to give her a lift to work each morning while her car is being repaired. It turns out that Liliana is having an affair with Arturo Tallarita and that the warehouses targeted by the bombs were both used by Liliana’s husband Adriano, who works for a computer company. Thus both cases seem to be connected, and Montalbano eventually uncovers a drugs operation involving Adriano Lombardo and his mafia connections, with Liliana and Arturo caught in the middle.
25	3	"A Voice in the Night"	Alberto Sironi	Andrea Camilleri & Francesco Bruni & Salvatore De Mola	29 April 2013
It’s Montalbano’s birthday, and on his way to work he encounters a driver who nearly runs him off the road. The man is subsequently arrested and he turns out to be Giovanni Strangio, the son of the President of the Province of Montelusa. A few days later Strangio comes to the police station to report the brutal killing of his fiancée, Mariangela Carlesimo. At the same time a theft is discovered at one of the largest supermarkets in Vigata, which is known to be owned by the Cuffaro family, and the board of directors is headed by another politician, a certain Mongibello. There are inconsistencies in the account of the supermarket manager, Guido Nicotra, who is later found to have hanged himself, although the pathologist suspects it was actually murder. A passing security guard also goes missing and is later found dead. Montalbano comes under pressure from his superiors as the politicians involved in the two cases deplore his attitude and his handling of the cases.
26	4	"A Ray of Light"	Alberto Sironi	Andrea Camilleri & Francesco Bruni & Salvatore De Mola	6 May 2013
Montalbano dreams that he is in an old quarry with a box containing the corpse of his boss, Bonetti Alderighi, with Catarella muttering in Latin. This is a premonition of what is to come. Back in the real world, Montalbano is faced with two cases to solve. The first concerns an alleged robbery and sexual assault suffered by Loredana Di Marti, whose husband comes to report the crime, but the facts as told to the police don’t add up. When Loredana’s friend, Valeria Bonifacio, is questioned, the case becomes even more puzzling, and Augello is sent to chat her up and find out more. The second case concerns the complaint of an elderly farmer who has found his abandoned barn with a brand new locked door, which neither he nor the two Tunisian immigrants who work for him know anything about. When he investigates, Montalbano finds the new door missing, and he discovers remnants of explosives and various armaments in the immediate area. The commissioner is told by his boss that the counter-terrorism department will handle the case, but as usual Montalbano ignores him. A third (presumed) Tunisian man also adds to the mystery. Separately, Montalbano's girlfriend, Livia, is experiencing anxiety attacks. The reason becomes clear when Montalbano and Livia go to the quarry that had been in his dream, where they make a grim discovery. Regarding the case of Loredana Di Marti, Montalbano suspects her friend Valeria of being the instigator of the crime, and finds a way to prove Valeria guilty through a daring bluff.

=== Season 10 (2016) ===
No. overall	No. in series	Title	Directed by	Written by	Original release date
27	1	"A Delicate Matter"	Alberto Sironi	Andrea Camilleri & Francesco Bruni & Leonardo Marini	29 February 2016
A sixty-seven-year-old prostitute, who is happily married to a local waiter, and who plies her lifelong trade in a sedate apartment, is strangled, and Montalbano is forced to cut short his holiday in Genoa with Livia to return to Vigata. Augello has become obsessed with the theory that the killing was the result of a bizarre erotic asphyxiation and his suspicion falls on thirty-something Mimmo Tavano, who is a client of the prostitute, and who also helps out at a centre for older people. But Montalbano in looking for a more straightforward solution to the crime. Later Tavano is also found murdered, which obviates Augello’s theory. There are several suspects who could have done it and one by one they are eliminated, to bring the commissioner and his team to the final answer.
28	2	"The Mud Pyramid"	Alberto Sironi	Andrea Camilleri & Francesco Bruni	7 March 2016
A man is found at the construction site of the new Vigata water pipeline shot in the back. The man is in his underwear, so Montalbano presumes he lives locally and has been fleeing his murderer. Montalbano and Fazio quickly identify him as Gerardo Nicotra, an accountant with the construction company working on the pipeline. Nicotra's German wife, Inge, is missing. Meanwhile, Lucia Gambardella, a journalist who has been investigating rigged contracts in Vigata for years, tells Montalbano about an attempt on the life of her informant, Saverio Piscopo, to prevent him reporting massive corruption among the various construction companies in the province. Montalbano takes charge of Piscopo’s security himself, and investigates Nicotra’s life. After negotiating a series of red herrings and lies, he realizes that Nicotra’s death and the attack on Piscopo are connected through a group of six construction companies owned by mafia families who are colluding on public construction contracts.

=== Season 11 (2017) ===
No. overall	No. in series	Title	Directed by	Written by	Original release date
29	1	"A Den of Vipers"	Alberto Sironi	Andrea Camilleri & Francesco Bruni & Salvatore De Mola & Leonardo Marini	27 February 2017
Businessman Cosimo Barletta is killed by a gunshot wound to the head while drinking coffee at his seaside villa. During the investigation, envelopes are discovered containing photographs of naked girls in compromising poses. The victim was also a well-known loan shark and had many enemies in Vigata. Unexpectedly, the autopsy reveals that Barletta was actually poisoned with a powerful medicine dissolved in his coffee, while the shooting took place later. Montalbano senses that the crime was committed by two different killers, who acted almost simultaneously unbeknown to each other. Initially the investigation focuses on the girls the victim was blackmailing, but they all have unassailable alibis. A month previously, however, Barletta fell in love with a new girl, to whom he promised a large sum of money and a house, and on the day of the murder he was about to change his will in her favour. Montalbano finally discovers that Barletta was shot by his son Arturo who has serious financial problems, while the poisoning was carried out by his daughter Giovanna, who had an incestuous relationship with her father and was jealous of his new girlfriend, as well as being afraid of losing her legacy. The other thread of the story concerns Camastra, a tramp who becomes friendly with Montalbano and Livia. The old man is too cultured and refined to be a simple vagrant, and they discover that he was once a surgeon who resigned after the death of a patient. Camastra witnessed the suicide of Barletta’s wife, who threw herself into the sea after discovering the affair between her husband and daughter. Just before Giovanna is arrested, she commits suicide with the same poison she used for her father.
30	2	"As Per Procedure"	Alberto Sironi	Andrea Camilleri & Francesco Bruni & Salvatore De Mola & Leonardo Marini	6 March 2017
Montalbano investigates a brutal attack on a young woman, who manages to drive herself to the entrance to an apartment block, where her naked body is found wrapped in a blood-soaked towel. Montalbano ascertains she is a prostitute from Eastern Europe involved in a major prostitution and drug ring run by the mafia Cuffaro family. The mafia put out a hit on Montalbano to stop him from investigating any further, and he only escapes being murdered because he once saved the life of one of the hitmen. The commissioner goes on to discover that a murdered photographer connected to the murdered girl was hired to film her being gang-raped. Suspecting corruption in the high echelons of government, Montalbano makes copies of the film in case the prosecutor tries to cover up the murder, and he succeeds in exposing the highly corrupt mayor of Vigata as the ringleader of the group that committed both killings. This investigation is intertwined with the story of a retired judge who lives near Montalbano. He is obsessed with reviewing all the cases he has heard over his career, to make sure he has always been objective in his judgements. The judge decides that one of his cases resulted in an innocent man being imprisoned and later dying in jail. The judge cannot live with this fact and commits suicide by setting fire to his house.

=== Season 12 (2018) ===
No. overall	No. in series	Title	Directed by	Written by	Original release date
31	1	"Carousel"	Alberto Sironi	Andrea Camilleri & Francesco Bruni & Salvatore De Mola & Leonardo Marini	12 February 2018
Montalbano faces two mysteries: (1) the disappearance of an antique dealer, Marcello Di Carlo, who may have risked revenge from the mafia by not paying adequate protection money; (2) a series of young women have been kidnapped but released unharmed an hour later. The mafia is implicated in the Di Carlo case for another reason – his shop is hit with an arson attack. As the complexities of the cases develop, Montalbano realises that the kidnappings and the Di Carlo case are linked. He discovers that Di Carlo’s girlfriend Silvana has disappeared, which adds to the mystery, since it also turns out that she has also been the lover of Di Carlo’s best friend. By discovering this love triangle, Montalbano starts unravelling the overall mystery. As the case is sorted out, it becomes clear that the killer has carefully prepared a series of deceptions to trip up Montalbano, but in the end the commissioner gets at the truth.
32	2	"Love"	Alberto Sironi	Andrea Camilleri & Francesco Bruni & Salvatore De Mola & Leonardo Marini	19 February 2018
In a dream, Montalbano is about to marry Livia and finds out that Livia is cheating on him with Mimi, an old flame. He wakes from the dream to the reality of the disappearance of Michela Prestia who had been seduced into prostitution. She had found a way out and began a serious relationship with Saverio. It appeared that she simply abandoned Saverio and went with another man. Montalbano soon understands that this did not happen. A married couple, elderly theatre actors who are near the end of their lives, rehearse their joint death. Their life together is portrayed as a joyous love. Ominously, the Di Giovanni couple are rehearsing their local production of Shakespeare’s “Romeo and Juliet”. Montalbano and Livia’s relationship grows stronger. Montalbano eventually recognises that the death of Michela was a tragic, crazy suicide.

=== Season 13 (2019) ===
No. overall	No. in series	Title	Directed by	Written by	Original release date
33	1	"The Other End of the Thread"	Alberto Sironi	Andrea Camilleri & Francesco Bruni & Salvatore De Mola & Leonardo Marini	11 February 2019
Livia wants Montalbano to get a new suit for a twenty-fifth wedding anniversary party and she sends him to the tailor and dressmaker Elena Biasini, a woman who also helps the police deal with the many migrants who are arriving each night by boat from North Africa. A few days later Elena is found murdered in her shop, killed by a pair of her own dressmaking scissors. Dr Osman, who helps out also as an interpreter for the immigrants, confesses to Montalbano that he was once Elena's lover. Another more recent lover and a young man who used to work in Elena’s shop are also suspects. However, Montalbano discovers that the real murderer is Anna Silch, the one-time mistress of Franco, Elena’s long-dead husband, who is presumed to have killed himself. Anna leaves a letter for Montalbano confessing that she also killed Franco. Thus, an old case of suicide is reclassified as homicide.
34	2	"The Diary From '43"	Alberto Sironi	Andrea Camilleri & Francesco Bruni & Salvatore De Mola & Leonardo Marini	18 February 2019
After the demolition of an old silo, a diary is found, written in the summer of 1943 by a young fascist, Carlo Colussi, in which he confesses that he has done something terrible. Montalbano is curious to find out what it could have been. The commissioner mistakenly connects what is written in the diary to the killing of an old businessman, Angelino Todaro, whom he suspects of being the Comrade T mentioned by Colussi. Eventually it comes to light that Colussi’s terrible act was blowing up some Allied soldiers in revenge for the rape of his girlfriend Anita. In fact Colussi is still alive, and after the war he became a priest and a missionary to atone for his guilt. At around the same time, a 90-year-old Italian-American called John Zuck arrives in Vigata. He tells the commissioner that he was born in Sicily and is actually called Giovanni Zuccotti. He was taken prisoner by the Allies during the war and taken to Texas, where he married and spent the rest of his life. His parents were killed in an accident and that is why he has never returned to Vigata until now. Montalbano realises that the murder of Todaro has nothing to do with the diary after all, but was committed by Zuck who has discovered that Todaro engineered the accident to Zuck’s parents in order to seize their property, and he has returned to Vigata to avenge their deaths. Before Montalbano is able to arrest him, Zuck commits suicide on the beach by shooting himself in the temple.

=== Season 14 (2020) ===
No. overall	No. in series	Title	Directed by	Written by	Original release date
35	1	"Dearest Salvo ... Your Livia"	Alberto Sironi & Luca Zingaretti	Andrea Camilleri & Francesco Bruni & Salvatore De Mola & Leonardo Marini	9 March 2020
A night watchman discovers Adelina's son, Pasquale, stealing from a villa. However, nothing seems to have been stolen so he can’t be charged and imprisoned.The mystery of what happened is only resolved when Montalbano discovers that the owner of the villa is having an affair with her brother-in-law, and when they were discovered by Pasquale, they paid him hush money to hide their actions. In a separate story, Agata Cosentino, an archivist and a friend of Livia's, is found dead, killed with a hammer, in the municipal archive of Vigata. The murder is a puzzle, given that she should not have been in the building while it was being renovated, and the killer should have been easy to find, because of all the blood. Montalbano has to eliminate many possible suspects, and think outside the box to figure out how the murderer was able to get away undetected. The answer lies in the fact that the murderer must have been naked, with no clothes on to be stained with blood. Montalbano further determines that the murderer was the director of the archive, naked because of a homosexual encounter, which Agata accidentally witnessed.
36	2	"The Safety Net"	Alberto Sironi & Luca Zingaretti	Andrea Camilleri & Francesco Bruni & Salvatore De Mola & Leonardo Marini	16 March 2020
Montalbano receives a visit from Ernesto Sabatello who brings him some films shot for six consecutive years by Sabatello's deceased father, which always depict the same thing: the fixed shot of a wall. The commissioner senses that there is a tragedy behind those films. It turns out that Sabatello's father was a twin and there was a grim family matter that Sabatello's father was commemorating. Separately, a story line develops at the school attended by Salvo, the son of Mimi Augello. The problem centres around the vicious bullying of a young computer nerd, Luigino. The issue gets serious when two masked gunmen burst into class and shoot bullets into the ceiling. Mimi is in the classroom at the time and tries to apprehend the gunmen as they leave, but isn't able to get a clear shot. In a poignant scene with Luigino, Montalbano works out why the gunmen were there and how the incident is tied to the bullying.

=== Season 15 (2021) ===
No. overall	No. in series	Title	Directed by	Written by	Original release date
37	1	"The Catalanotti Method"	Alberto Sironi & Luca Zingaretti	Andrea Camilleri & Ester Viola	8 March 2021
Commissioner Montalbano's investigation doesn't start with Catarella's usual phone call. Instead, his deputy, Mimì Augello, bursts into Montalbano's house in the middle of the night and recounts how he stumbled upon a corpse in an abandoned apartment during an amorous encounter. Almost simultaneously, Carmelo Catalanotti, a loan shark and theatre director, is found dead in his own flat. Notorious for creating a unique acting method, Catalanotti's approach was both ingenious and traumatic, compelling actors to fully inhabit their roles by confronting their deepest, darkest secrets. These intense sessions, akin to unorthodox psychotherapy, allowed him to manipulate the very core of his actors' beings. Against a backdrop of unspoken domestic violence and "borderline" psychoanalytic sessions aimed at perfecting theatrical performance, Montalbano solves the case. The investigation is further complicated by the presence of a young and attractive head of the forensic team who awakens a deep passion in Montalbano, stirring feelings he hadn't experienced in years.
