= The Terracotta Dog =

1996 novel by Andrea Camilleri

- Italian first edition cover
- Author: Andrea Camilleri
- Original title: Il cane di terracotta
- Translator: Stephen Sartarelli
- Language: Italian/Sicilian
- Series: Inspector Salvo Montalbano, #2
- Genre: Crime, Mystery novel
- Publisher: Sellerio (ITA); Viking (US); Macmillan/Picador (UK)
- Publication date: 18 April 1996
- Publication place: Italy, Sicily
- English publication date: 2002
- Media type: Print (Hardcover, Paperback)
- Pages: 288 pp 352 pp (Eng. trans.)
- ISBN: 0-330-49291-8 (Eng. trans.)
- OCLC: 59278658
- Preceded by: The Shape Of Water
- Followed by: The Snack Thief

The Terracotta Dog (Italian: Il cane di terracotta) is a 1996 novel by Andrea Camilleri, translated into English in 2002 by Stephen Sartarelli.

It is the second novel of the internationally popular Inspector Montalbano series. While chasing down a mafia crime, Montalbano finds a cave with symbolic artifacts and the bodies of two young lovers, hidden since World War II.

== Plot summary ==
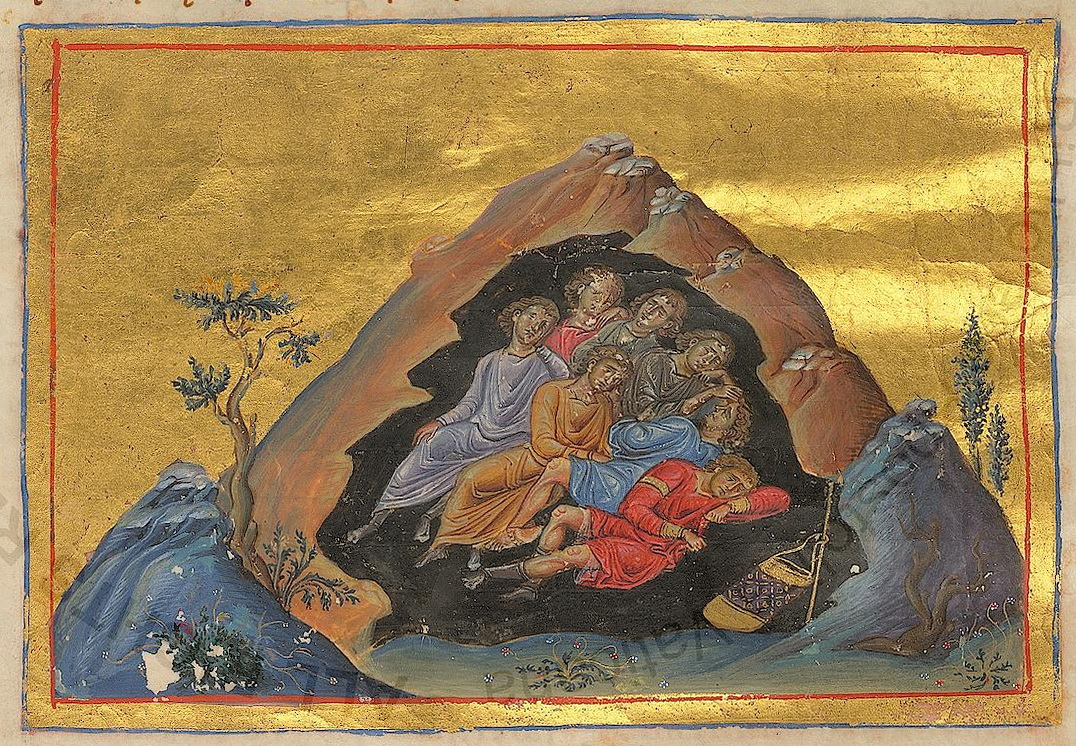
An illustration of the legend of the Seven Sleepers

The story starts off with "Tano Il Greco", a tired mafia boss, making a deal with Montalbano to stage his arrest in order for him to save face. The arrest causes Montalbano to have to appear at a press conference and be considered for promotion, both of which he does not appreciate. At the same time there has also been a seemingly unrelated and mysterious theft of a grocery store delivery truck; the truck is discovered the next morning, abandoned, with the stolen goods still within and intact.

An old man, Misucara, who was witness to the robbery, then dies in a suspicious accident, but not before passing on an odd bit of information to the inspector: that the grocery store owner's car was parked nearby during the time of the robbery. When Tano ends up dying at the hands of mafia rivals during a police transfer, he passes on information to Montalbano that leads the inspector and his team to search for a secret cave used as a black market goods store during World War II and now used for smuggling arms for the mafia, in which the grocery store owner was complicit.

Montalbano notices that the inside of the cave is not symmetrical and figures out there must be a secret room, where he discovers the bodies of two young lovers, carefully arranged in what appears to be some kind of ancient ritual guarded by a terracotta dog. Learning that the bodies were placed sometime around the allied invasion and devastating bombing of the island at the end of World War II, Montalbano interviews local residents from that time to try to piece together who the young couple were, why they were killed and why they were ritually buried.

The young couple turn out to be Lisetta, a local girl with a sexually abusive father, and her lover Mario, a young Italian soldier stationed at a repair ship that had been docked for an extended period at the town of Vigata. Believing that his ship was to be called to sail soon, Mario had implored Lisetta to come see him one last time, and she had run away then, which resulted in the two lovers presumably being killed when discovered by the jealous father of Lisetta.

This knowledge, however, does not satisfy the inspector, as while he had deciphered the identity of the couple and the reason for their murder, the ritualistic method of their burial still remained a mystery. One thing that puzzles Montalbano as he learns more about the ritual burial is that it doesn't make sense, because it is a mixture of different traditions, and this leads him to look for someone who might have knowledge of different burial rites. And once he has a suspect for the person that conducted the ritual burial, Montalbano stages an elaborate ploy to get onto the TV news so that maybe his suspect living in some other part of Italy might get his message and return to the site of the crime 50 years later.

It turns out Lisetta's cousin Lillo, who had been very fond of his little cousin, had put up the couple at Lisetta's request in his house. However, the couple had been killed one day when Lillo was out of the house by Lisetta's father's man. Lillo, in his rage, then killed the man. In a state of denial over the incident, he then buries the two lovers in a ritual miming the legend of the Seven Sleepers, in the hopes that like the sleepers, they will reawaken one day. Due to his academic work in studying the legend, he invokes both Christian and Islamic elements in the ritual. He then left Sicily in the hopes of putting all this behind him, until the Inspector resurrected the lovers with his discovery.

== Characters ==
- Salvo Montalbano, Vigàta's chief police station
- Domenico "Mimì" Augello, Montalbano's deputy and close friend
- Giuseppe Fazio, Montalbano's right-hand man
- Agatino Catarella, police officer
- Livia Burlando, Montalbano's eternal girlfriend
- Dr. Pasquano, Vigàta's local forensic pathologist
- Tano "Il Greco", mafia boss
- Lisetta Moscato and Mario Cunich, two young lovers buried in the cave
- Calogero Rizzitano, witness of the murder
- Headmaster Burgio, retired teacher and Montalbano's friend
- Gegè Gullotta, Montalbano's boyhood friend

== Adaptation ==
It was first adapted for television by RAI with Luca Zingaretti in the TV series Inspector Montalbano. The episode was first aired on 9 May 2000.
