= The Voice of the Violin =

1997 novel by Andrea Camilleri

- Italian first edition cover
- Author: Andrea Camilleri
- Original title: La voce del violino
- Translator: Stephen Sartarelli
- Language: Italian/Sicilian
- Series: Inspector Salvo Montalbano, #4
- Genre: Crime, Mystery novel
- Publisher: Sellerio (ITA); Viking (US); Macmillan/Picador (UK)
- Publication date: 12 December 1997
- Publication place: Italy, Sicily
- English publication date: 2003
- Media type: Print (Hardcover, Paperback)
- Pages: 224 pp 272 pp (Eng. trans.)
- ISBN: 0-330-49298-5 (Eng. trans.)
- OCLC: 57006171
- Preceded by: The Snack Thief
- Followed by: Excursion to Tindari

The Voice of the Violin (Italian: La voce del violino) is a 1997 novel by Andrea Camilleri, translated into English in 2003 by Stephen Sartarelli.

It is the fourth novel of the internationally popular Inspector Montalbano series.

== Plot introduction ==
It is one of those black days that afflict Montalbano, who becomes intractable when the weather is bad. On his way to a funeral, Montalbano's driver avoids what seems to be a suicidal chicken, making the car skid and hitting another car parked in front of a villa. The inspector leaves a note under the windshield wiper of the damaged car to warn the owner. Since his colleague complains about the blow he received, the two go to the hospital. On the way back - it has now become too late for the funeral ceremony - the inspector notices that the damaged car has remained where he left it with the ticket still in the windshield wiper.

Finding the damaged car still where it was the next morning, Montalbano forces the door of the villa which has signs of being inhabited but appears deserted. He wanders through the various rooms until in a bedroom a gruesome scene appears in the eyes of the inspector: a young woman, blonde and beautiful, completely naked, lies dead in her bed.

== Reception ==
Maxine Clark described the novel as "a perfect example of all that is good about this series. The plot is one of the stronger, leaner ones".

== Adaptation ==
It was first adapted for television by RAI with Luca Zingaretti in the TV series Inspector Montalbano. The episode was the second of the series and aired on 13 May 1999.
