= Zingaretti =

Zingaretti is an Italian surname. Notable people with the surname include:

- Luca Zingaretti (born 1961), Italian actor and film director
- Nicola Zingaretti (born 1965), Italian politician, brother of Luca
