= L'odore della notte =

L'odore della notte may refer to:

- L'odore della notte (novel), a 2001 novel
- L'odore della notte (film), a 1998 crime film
