= August Heat =

2006 novel by Andrea Camilleri

- First edition (Italy)
- Author: Andrea Camilleri
- Original title: La Vampa d'Agosto
- Translator: Stephen Sartarelli
- Language: Italian/Sicilian
- Series: Inspector Salvo Montalbano, #10
- Genre: Crime, Mystery novel
- Publisher: Macmillan/Picador
- Publication date: 20 April 2006
- Publication place: Italy, Sicily
- English publication date: 2009
- Media type: Print (Hardcover, Paperback)
- ISBN: 978-1-4362-0784-3 (Eng. trans.)
- OCLC: 191929160
- Preceded by: The Paper Moon
- Followed by: The Wings of the Sphinx

August Heat (Italian: La Vampa d'Agosto) is a 2006 novel by Andrea Camilleri, translated into English in 2009 by Stephen Sartarelli. It is the tenth novel in the internationally popular Inspector Montalbano series.

== Plot ==
A grueling, relentless sun is the background to this episode: and the most fiery heat of this hottest summer month in Sicily is paralleled by the fervour and passion that inflames Montalbano. It's August, his deputy Mimì Augello had to anticipate his holidays, and Montalbano is forced to remain at Vigata, taking care of police business. Fiancée Livia joins him, but so as not to be alone with Montalbano's always working, she brings along a friend (with husband and baby) and asks Salvo to rent a beach house for them. All is well as the holiday develops nicely, but one day the couple's little boy disappears. Montalbano rushes into the garden to help in the search and discovers a tunnel that will reveal sensational surprises, including a trunk with the body of a missing girl who disappeared six years before.
