= Marco Vichi =

Italian novelist and short story writer (born 1957)

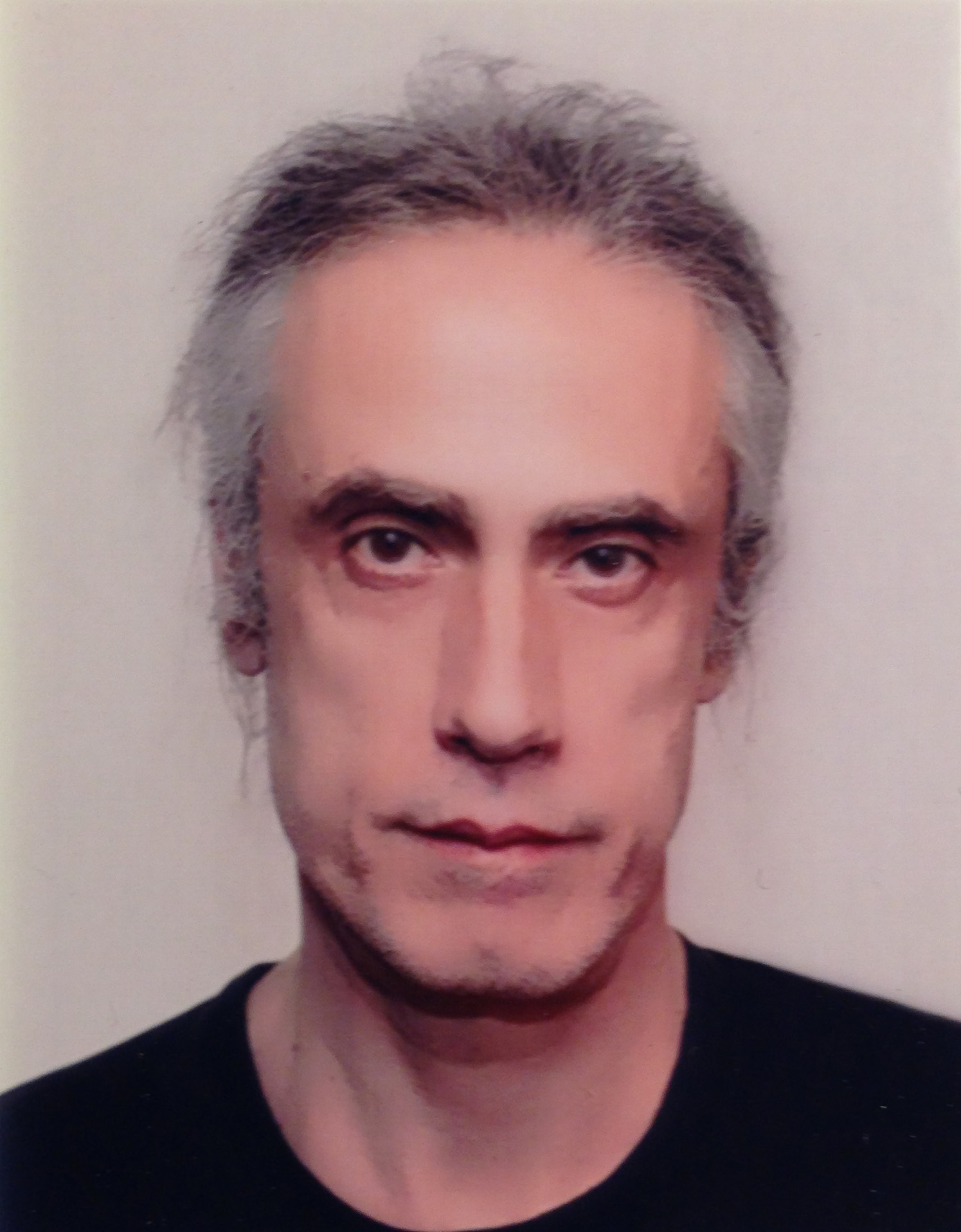
- Born: Marco Vichi; 20 November 1957 (age 68); Florence, Italy
- Occupations: Novelist, Journalist, Screenwriter
- Writing career
- Period: 1999–present

Marco Vichi (born 20 November 1957) is an Italian novelist and short story writer who has also edited a number of crime anthologies. Born in Florence, he now lives in the Chianti hills.

Several of Vichi's Inspector Bordelli novels, set in the 1960s, have recently been published in English (translated by Stephen Sartarelli).

== Bibliography ==
Incomplete, English translations only. For full bibliography see the Italian Wikipedia page.

=== The Inspector Bordelli novels ===
- Death in August, set in 1963 (Il commissario Bordelli, 2002)
- Death and the Olive Grove, set in 1964 (Una brutta faccenda, 2003)
- Death in Sardinia, set in 1965 (Il nuovo venuto, 2004)
- Death in Florence, set in 1966 (Morte a Firenze, 2009)
- Death in the Tuscan Hills, set in 1967 (La forza del destino, 2011)
- Ghosts of the Past, set in 1967 (Fantasmi del passato, 2011)

== Prizes and recognition ==
- 2004 – Il nuovo venuto won the Premio Fedeli
- 2009 – Morte a Firenze won the Premio Scerbanenco
- 2013 – Death in Sardinia was shortlisted for the CWA International Dagger award
