= Garibaldi's Lovers =

- Theatrical release poster
- Directed by: Silvio Soldini
- Screenplay by: Doriana Leondeff; Marco Pettenello
- Story by: Silvio Soldini
- Produced by: Lionello Cerri
- Starring: Valerio Mastandrea; Alba Rohrwacher; Giuseppe Battiston; Claudia Gerini; Luca Zingaretti
- Cinematography: Ramiro Civita
- Edited by: Carlotta Cristiani
- Production companies: Lumiere & Co; Ventura Film
- Distributed by: Warner Bros. Pictures
- Release date: 18 October 2012
- Running time: 108 minutes
- Country: Italy
- Language: Italian
- Box office: $1,673,004

Garibaldi's Lovers (Italian: Il comandante e la cicogna, also known as The Commander and the Stork) is a 2012 Italian comedy film directed by Silvio Soldini.

== Cast ==
- Valerio Mastandrea: Leo
- Alba Rohrwacher: Diana
- Claudia Gerini: Teresa
- Luca Zingaretti: Avvocato Malaffano
- Giuseppe Battiston: Amanzio
- Giuseppe Cederna: Direttore supermarket
