= The Patience of the Spider =

2004 novel by Andrea Camilleri

- First edition (Italy)
- Author: Andrea Camilleri
- Original title: La pazienza del ragno
- Translator: Stephen Sartarelli
- Language: Italian/Sicilian
- Series: Inspector Salvo Montalbano, #8
- Genre: Crime, Mystery novel
- Publisher: Macmillan/Picador
- Publication date: 30 September 2004
- Publication place: Italy, Sicily
- English publication date: 2007
- Media type: Print (Hardcover, Paperback)
- ISBN: 978-0-14-311203-7 (Eng. trans.)
- OCLC: 70294723
- LC Class: PQ4863.A3894 G36813 2006
- Preceded by: Rounding the Mark
- Followed by: The Paper Moon

The Patience of the Spider (Italian: La pazienza del ragno) is a 2004 novel by Andrea Camilleri, translated into English in 2007 by Stephen Sartarelli. It is the eighth novel in the internationally popular Inspector Montalbano series.
