= Rounding the Mark =

2003 novel by Andrea Camilleri

- First edition (Italy)
- Author: Andrea Camilleri
- Original title: 'Il giro di boa'
- Translator: Stephen Sartarelli
- Language: Italian/Sicilian
- Series: Inspector Salvo Montalbano, #7
- Genre: Crime, Mystery novel
- Publisher: Macmillan/Picador
- Publication date: 14 March 2003
- Publication place: Italy, Sicily
- English publication date: 2006
- Media type: Print (Hardcover, Paperback)
- ISBN: 0-330-44219-8 (Eng. trans.)
- OCLC: 80331835
- Preceded by: The Scent of the Night
- Followed by: The Patience of the Spider

Rounding the Mark (Italian: Il giro di boa) is a 2003 novel by Andrea Camilleri, translated into English in 2006 by Stephen Sartarelli. It is the seventh novel in the internationally popular Inspector Montalbano series.
