= The Track of Sand =

2007 novel by Andrea Camilleri

- First edition (Italy)
- Author: Andrea Camilleri
- Original title: La pista di sabbia
- Translator: Stephen Sartarelli
- Language: Italian/Sicilian
- Series: Inspector Salvo Montalbano, #12
- Genre: Crime, Mystery novel
- Publisher: Penguin Books/Sellerio Editore
- Publication date: 7 June 2007
- Publication place: Italy, Sicily
- English publication date: 2010
- Media type: Print (Hardcover, Paperback)
- ISBN: 0-14-311793-9 (Eng. trans.)
- OCLC: 427757200
- Preceded by: The Wings of the Sphinx
- Followed by: The Potter's Field

The Track of Sand (Italian: La pista di sabbia) is a novel by Andrea Camilleri, first published in Italy by Sellerio Editore in 2007, and translated into English by Stephen Sartarelli for Penguin Books in 2010. It is the twelfth novel in the internationally popular Inspector Montalbano series.
