= The Wings of the Sphinx =

2006 novel by Andrea Camilleri

- First edition (Italy)
- Author: Andrea Camilleri
- Original title: Le ali della sfinge
- Translator: Stephen Sartarelli
- Language: Italian/Sicilian
- Series: Inspector Salvo Montalbano, #11
- Genre: Crime, mystery novel
- Publisher: Penguin Books/Sellerio Editore
- Publication date: 9 November 2006
- Publication place: Italy, Sicily
- English publication date: 2009
- Media type: Print (hard and paperback)
- ISBN: 978-0-14-311660-8 (Eng. trans.)
- OCLC: 427757200
- Preceded by: August Heat
- Followed by: The Track of Sand

The Wings of the Sphinx (Italian: Le ali della sfinge) is a 2006 novel by Andrea Camilleri, translated into English in 2009 by Stephen Sartarelli. It is the eleventh novel in the internationally popular Inspector Montalbano series.

It was adapted for season 7 of the Inspector Montalbano TV series in 2009.

== Summary ==
Whatever happened to those early mornings when, upon awakening, for no reason, he would feel a sort of current of pure happiness running through him?

— Andrea Camilleri, op. cit., p. 1

It's a dark period that Montalbano is going through, especially for his stormy relationship with partner Livia, whom he has recently betrayed with another woman (in the previous episode). Moreover, his police work adds to the personal problems, with administrative frustrations (the precinct is running out of gasoline for their police cars, and there are no new supplies) and operational hindrances from his superiors.

So the usual phone call from Catarella is more than welcome, even though it inevitably comes when the inspector is in the shower. A girl's body has been found in a dump (on a beach in the TV episode), left there as waste to get rid of. Only one distinguishing sign: a sphinx butterfly tattooed on the shoulder. Coroner Pasquano is convinced the actual murder has taken place elsewhere, the day before.

Montalbano discovers that the girl, who emigrated to Italy from Russia with other young people like her, was hosted and assisted by a Catholic charity organisation that seems to have something to hide. What convinces Montalbano that things are as he suspects is the fact that the other girls came from the same country and have the same tattoo, and are now all sponsored by this Catholic charity. Naturally, his chief summons him and advises him to use the utmost caution, since important politicians and prelates are involved.
