= The Age of Doubt =

2008 novel by Andrea Camilleri

- First edition (Italy)
- Author: Andrea Camilleri
- Original title: L'età del dubbio
- Translator: Stephen Sartarelli
- Language: Italian/Sicilian
- Series: Inspector Salvo Montalbano, #14
- Genre: Crime, Mystery novel
- Publisher: Sellerio Editore
- Publication date: 23 October 2008
- Publication place: Italy, Sicily
- English publication date: 2012
- Media type: Print (Hardcover, Paperback)
- Pages: 288
- ISBN: 978-0-14-312092-6 (Eng. trans.)
- Preceded by: The Potter's Field

The Age of Doubt (Italian: L'età del dubbio) is a 2008 novel by Andrea Camilleri, translated into English in 2012 by Stephen Sartarelli. It is the fourteenth novel in the internationally popular Inspector Montalbano series.

== Plot ==
Inspector Montalbano has a dream in between the tragic and the ridiculous, which reveals his recurring thoughts about death and his relationship with Livia.

In the dream, he's witnessing his own funeral, Catarella himself tells him that he's dead. Attending the funeral are the usual police investigators: Coroner Dr. Pasquano, who grumpily refuses to give details on the deceased before the autopsy, Questor Bonetti-Alderighi, who does not authorize Montalbano to investigate his own death, and his friend Mimì Augello. They are all there, except for one person: Livia, his girlfriend. An irritated Montalbano phones her and she calmly tells him that she won't have time to attend the funeral and that, to say it plainly, she will in fact seize this unique opportunity, his death, to extricate herself from an overlong relationship and look for pastures new.

A loud noise wakes Montalbano, caused by the stormy sea. The sea and the port of Vigata become the setting of Montalbano's new investigation, involving two vessels moored side by side at the Vigata docks: a powerful speedboat and the "Vanna", a luxury yacht whose crew has found a dinghy at sea carrying a disfigured man killed by poison.

Montalbano suspects foul play involving some of the vessels' crews and asks for the collaboration of a female officer of the Port Authorities: enter Laura, a beautiful and intelligent young woman who falls desperately in love with the Inspector, who loses his heart to her, like a passionate teenager.

Action and introspection alternate in this 14th novel, which sees Montalbano wrestling with doubts and existential thoughts whilst trying to resolve a complicated case of diamond trafficking.

== Reception ==
Joan Smith, writing in The Times, That the comedy in the book cane "perilously close to farce", which sat "oddly with the novel's sombre atmosphere". She also criticised the treatment of women, finding it to be reflective of "sexist assumptions of an earlier age".
