= The Paper Moon =

2005 novel by Andrea Camilleri

- First edition (Italy)
- Author: Andrea Camilleri
- Original title: La Luna di Carta
- Translator: Stephen Sartarelli
- Language: Italian/Sicilian
- Series: Inspector Salvo Montalbano, #9
- Genre: Crime, Mystery novel
- Publisher: Macmillan/Picador
- Publication date: 23 June 2005
- Publication place: Italy, Sicily
- English publication date: 2008
- Media type: Print (Hardcover, Paperback)
- ISBN: 978-1-4362-0784-3 (Eng. trans.)
- OCLC: 166382351
- Preceded by: The Patience of the Spider
- Followed by: August Heat

The Paper Moon (Italian: La Luna di Carta) is a 2005 novel by Andrea Camilleri, translated into English in 2008 by Stephen Sartarelli. It is the ninth novel in the internationally popular Inspector Montalbano series.

== Summary ==
Montalbano nostalgically recalls his boyhood and the memories of his family, remembering episodes that stayed imprinted in his imagination, like when his father pulled his leg by stating that the Moon was made of paper and he faithfully believed him. He now starts to feel his age, worried that he's getting old and has not loved enough, especially those closest to him and now disappeared — a fact too late to remedy by showing his full love now, since they are no more. (Note: In the episode The Snack Thief Montalbano is contacted by his father's associate notifying him that his father is terminally ill and, aware of his impending death, did not want to make it known to his son, so as to spare him the agony of his suffering. In fact, Montalbano will arrive at the hospital when his father is already dead, thus bitterly reproaching himself for his selfishness because, even though aware that the father was sick, he chose to ignore it.)

Paper Moon follows the narration of Montalbano's inner crisis and his depression about oncoming old age, which seems to be afflicting him in mind and body. He meditates about death and the problems of growing old, with all its respective little impairments (loss of memory, sudden fears, loneliness and a propensity for crying). So he decides that the best way to get out of these bouts of melancholy is to dive head first into a new investigation. The opportunity is presented by a beautiful woman, who comes to the police station in order to advise of her brother's disappearance. Montalbano soon finds the man in a sort of pied-à-terre, killed by a shot in the face and left in an obscene position: a suitable position, since the man was a well-known womanizer and had many sexual affairs with attractive women, one of whom seems more involved than the others, Elena Sclafani.

The Inspector will not find it easy to solve the murder, pushed around by astute women trying to lead him to believe that "the Moon is made of paper".
