= Andrea Camilleri =

Italian writer (1925–2019)

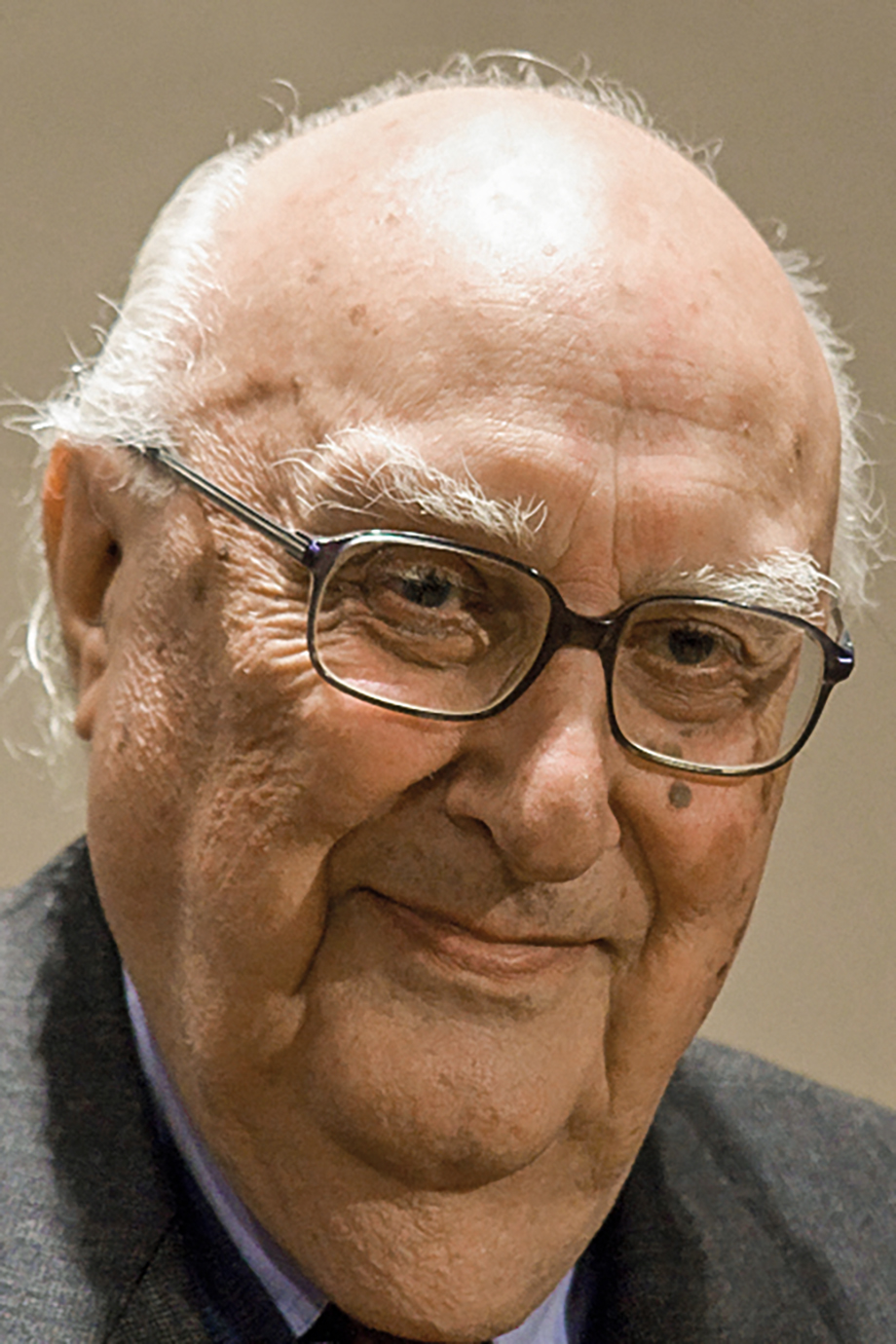
- Camilleri in 2010
- Born: Andrea Calogero Camilleri; 6 September 1925; Porto Empedocle, Sicily, Kingdom of Italy
- Died: 17 July 2019 (aged 93); Rome, Lazio, Italy
- Resting place: Protestant Cemetery, Rome
- Education: Accademia Nazionale di Arte Drammatica Silvio D'Amico
- Occupations: Writer; director
- Spouse: Rosetta dello Siesto (m. 1957)
- Children: 3
- Writing career
- Years active: 1950–2019
- Notable works: Inspector Montalbano novels Inspector Montalbano TV series
- Notable awards: Order of Merit of the Italian Republic (2003)

Andrea Calogero Camilleri (Italian pronunciation: [anˈdrɛːa kamilˈlɛːri]; 6 September 1925 – 17 July 2019) was an Italian writer best known for his Salvo Montalbano crime novels.

Born in Porto Empedocle, Sicily, Camilleri studied stage and film direction at the Silvio D'Amico Academy of Dramatic Arts and worked as a director and screenwriter for the theatre and for television, including productions for RAI; from 1977 he taught film direction at the academy for twenty years. He published his first novel in 1978, but reached a wide readership only with La stagione della caccia (The Hunting Season, 1992). In 1994 he published The Shape of Water, the first of the Montalbano novels, which are set in the fictional Sicilian town of Vigàta and written in Italian mixed with Sicilian. The series was adapted for television as Inspector Montalbano, starring Luca Zingaretti, and in 2012 Camilleri won the Crime Writers' Association's International Dagger for The Potter's Field.

== Biography ==
Originally from Porto Empedocle, Girgenti, Sicily, Camilleri began university studies in the Faculty of Literature at the University of Palermo, but did not complete his degree; during that time he published poems and short stories.

From 1948 to 1950, he studied stage and film direction at the Silvio D'Amico Academy of Dramatic Arts (Accademia Nazionale d'Arte Drammatica) and began to take on work as a director and screenwriter, directing especially plays by Pirandello and Beckett. His parents knew and reportedly were "distant friends" of Pirandello, as he relates in his essay on Pirandello, Biography of the Changed Son. His most famous works, the Montalbano series, exhibit many Pirandellian elements: for example, the wild olive tree that helps Montalbano think is on stage in his late work The Giants of the Mountain.

With RAI, Camilleri worked on several TV productions, such as Le inchieste del commissario Maigret with Gino Cervi. In 1977, he returned to the Academy of Dramatic Arts, holding the chair of Film Direction and occupying it for 20 years.

Camilleri wrote his first novel, Il Corso Delle Cose ("The Way Things Go"), in 1978. This was followed by Un Filo di Fumo ("A Thread of Smoke") in 1980. Neither of these works enjoyed any significant popularity.

In 1992, after a long pause of 12 years, Camilleri once more took up novel writing. A new book, La Stagione della Caccia ("The Hunting Season") became a best-seller.

In 1994, Camilleri published La forma dell'Acqua (The Shape of Water), the first in a long series of novels featuring Inspector Salvo Montalbano, a fractious detective in the police force of Vigàta, an imaginary Sicilian town. The series is written in Italian but with a substantial sprinkling of Sicilian phrases and grammar. The name Montalbano is an homage to the Spanish writer Manuel Vázquez Montalbán; the similarities between Montalban's Pepe Carvalho and Camilleri's fictional detective are noteworthy. Both writers make use of their protagonists' gastronomic preferences.

This interesting quirk has become something of a fad among his readership, even in mainland Italy. The TV adaptation of Montalbano's adventures, starring Luca Zingaretti, further increased Camilleri's popularity to such a point that in 2003 Camilleri's home town, Porto Empedocle – on which Vigàta is modelled – took the extraordinary step of changing its official name to that of Porto Empedocle Vigàta, no doubt with an eye to capitalising on the tourism possibilities thrown up by the author's work. On his website, Camilleri refers to the engaging and multi-faceted character of Montalbano as a "serial killer of characters," meaning that he has developed a life of his own and demands great attention from his author to the detriment of other potential books and characters. Camilleri added that he wrote a Montalbano novel every so often just so that the character would be appeased and allow him to work on other stories.

In 2012, Camilleri's The Potter's Field (translated by Stephen Sartarelli) was announced as the winner of the 2012 Crime Writers' Association International Dagger. The announcement was made on 5 July 2012 at the awards ceremony held at One Birdcage Walk in London.

In his last years, Camilleri lived in Rome where he worked as a TV and theatre director. About 10 million copies of his novels have been sold to date and are becoming increasingly popular in the UK (where BBC Four broadcast the Montalbano TV series from mid-2011), Australia and North America.

In addition to the degree of popularity brought him by the novels, Andrea Camilleri became even more of a media icon thanks to the parodies aired on an RAI radio show, where popular comedian, TV host and impressionist Fiorello presents him as a raspy-voiced, caustic character, madly in love with cigarettes and smoking, since in Italy, Camilleri was well known for being a heavy smoker of cigarettes. He considered himself a "non-militant atheist".

On 17 June 2019, Camilleri suffered a heart attack. He was admitted to hospital in a critical condition. He died on 17 July 2019.

== Recognitions ==

- 1998 Nino Martoglio International Book Award.
- 2003 Grand Officer in the Order of Merit of the Italian Republic (Grande Ufficiale Ordine al Merito della Repubblica Italiana).
- 2008 RBA Prize for Crime Writing for La rizzagliata / La muerte de Amalia Sacerdote ("The Death of Amalia Sacerdote"), the world's most lucrative crime fiction prize at €125,000.
- Asteroid 204816 Andreacamilleri, discovered by Italian amateur astronomer Vincenzo Casulli in 2007, was named in his honour. The official naming citation was published by the Minor Planet Center on 5 October 2017 (M.P.C. 106503).

=== Honorary degrees ===
He received honorary degrees from several Italian universities, including the IULM University of Milan (2002), the University of Pisa (2005), the University of L'Aquila (2007), and the D'Annunzio University of Chieti—Pescara (2007). In 2012, he received an honorary PhD from the Sapienza University of Rome.

Camilleri also received honorary degrees from University College Dublin on 5 December 2011 and the American University of Rome on 30 October 2013.

== Bibliography ==
=== Inspector Salvo Montalbano (1994–2020) ===
(excluding short stories)

Montalbano Series
Italian title	Year of Italian publication	Italian publisher	Year of English publication	English title	English publisher
La forma dell'acqua	1994	Sellerio	2002	The Shape of Water	Picador
Il cane di Terracotta	1996	Sellerio	2002	The Terracotta Dog	Picador
Il ladro di merendine	1996	Sellerio	2003	The Snack Thief	Picador
La voce del violino	1997	Sellerio	2003	The Voice of the Violin	Picador
Gita a Tindari	2000	Sellerio	2005	Excursion to Tindari	Picador
L'odore della notte	2001	Sellerio	2005	The Scent of the Night	Picador
Il giro di boa	2003	Sellerio	2006	Rounding the Mark	Picador
La pazienza del ragno	2004	Sellerio	2007	The Patience of the Spider	Picador
La luna di carta	2005	Sellerio	2008	The Paper Moon	Picador
La vampa d'agosto	2006	Sellerio	2009	August Heat	Picador
Le ali della sfinge	2006	Sellerio	2009	The Wings of the Sphinx	Penguin Books
La pista di sabbia	2007	Sellerio	2010	The Track of Sand	Penguin Books
Il campo del vasaio	2008	Sellerio	2011	The Potter's Field	Penguin Books
L'età del dubbio	2008	Sellerio	2012	The Age of Doubt	Penguin Books
La danza del gabbiano	2009	Sellerio	2013	The Dance of the Seagull	Penguin Books
La caccia al tesoro	2010	Sellerio	2013	Treasure Hunt	Penguin Books
Il sorriso di Angelica	2010	Sellerio	2014	Angelica's Smile	Penguin Books
Il gioco degli specchi	2011	Sellerio	2015	Game of Mirrors	Penguin Books
Una lama di luce	2012	Sellerio	2015	Blade of Light	Penguin Books
Una voce di notte	2012	Sellerio	2016	A Voice in the Night	Penguin Books
Un covo di vipere	2013	Sellerio	2017	A Nest of Vipers	Penguin Books
La piramide di fango	2014	Sellerio	2018	The Pyramid of Mud	Penguin Books
La giostra degli scambi	2015	Sellerio	2019	The Overnight Kidnapper	Penguin Books
L'altro capo del filo	2016	Sellerio	2019	The Other End of the Line	Penguin Books
La rete di protezione	2017	Sellerio	2020	The Safety Net	Penguin Books
Il metodo Catalanotti	2018	Sellerio	2020	The Sicilian Method	Penguin Books
Il cuoco dell'Alcyon	2019	Sellerio	2021	The Cook of the Halcyon	Penguin Books
Riccardino	2020	Sellerio	2022	Riccardino	Mantle

=== Other ===
(including Montalbano short stories)

- Le Arancine di Montalbano (1999) ISBN 88-04-46972-2
- Biografia di un figlio cambiato (2000) ISBN 88-17-86612-1
- Il birraio di Preston (1995) ISBN 88-389-1098-7
- La bolla di componenda (1993)
- La concessione del telefono (1998) ISBN 88-389-1344-7
- La concessione del telefono: versione teatrale dell'omonimo romanzo (2005) ISBN 88-7796-265-8
- Il corso delle cose (1978; revised edition, 1998) ISBN 88-389-1472-9
- Il diavolo: tentatore, innamorato (2005) ISBN 88-7989-960-0
- Favole del tramonto (2000) ISBN 88-86772-22-X
- Un filo di fumo (1980)
- Il gioco della mosca (1995) ISBN 88-389-1193-2
- Gocce di Sicilia (2001) ISBN 88-86772-08-4 (Texts originally published in the Almanacco dell'Altana between 1995 and 2000.)
- Le inchieste del commissario Collura (2002) ISBN 88-7415-002-4
- La linea della palma: Saverio Lodato fa raccontare Andrea Camilleri (2002) ISBN 88-17-87050-1
- Il medaglione (2005) ISBN 88-04-55027-9
- Un mese con Montalbano (1998) ISBN 88-04-44465-7 (Thirty short stories)
- Montalbano a viva voce (2002) ISBN 88-04-50974-0 (Two audio CDs)
- La mossa del cavallo (1999) ISBN 88-17-86083-2
- L'ombrello di Noe (2002) ISBN 88-17-87011-0
- Le parole raccontate: piccolo dizionario dei termini teatrali (2001) ISBN 88-17-86888-4
- La paura di Montalbano (2002) ISBN 88-04-50694-6 (Six short stories)
- The Fourth Secret (2014), a short story taken from La paura di Montalbano
- La Pensione Eva: romanzo (2006) ISBN 88-04-55434-7
- La presa di Macallè (2003) ISBN 88-389-1896-1 (Novel in the dialect of Sicily)
- La prima indagine di Montalbano (2004) ISBN 88-04-52983-0
- Privo di titolo (2005) ISBN 88-389-2030-3
- Racconti quotidiani (2001) ISBN 88-900411-4-5
- Il re di Girgenti (2001) ISBN 88-389-1668-3
- Romanzi storici e civili (2004) ISBN 88-04-51929-0
- La scomparsa di Patò: romanzo (2000) ISBN 88-04-48412-8
- Hunting Season (2014) La stagione della caccia (1992, 1998) ISBN 88-389-1018-9
- Storie di Montalbano (2002) ISBN 88-04-50427-7
- La strage dimenticata (1997) ISBN 88-389-1388-9
- I teatri stabili in Italia (1898–1918) (1959)
- Teatro (2003)
- La testa ci fa dire: dialogo con Andrea Camilleri (2000) ISBN 88-389-1568-7
- Vi racconto Montalbano: interviste (2006) ISBN 88-7981-302-1
- Il colore del sole (2007)
- Le pecore ed il pastore (2007)
- La novella di Antonello da Palermo (2007)
- Voi non sapete (2007)
- Maruzza Musumeci (2007)
- Il tailleur grigio (2008)
- Il casellante (2008)
- La muerte de Amalia Sacerdote (2008), La muerte de Amalia Sacerdote (Spanish) ISBN 978-8490565063
- Un sabato, con gli amici (2009)
- Il sonaglio (2009)
- La rizzagliata (2009)
- La tana delle vipere (2009)
- Il nipote del Negus (2010) ISBN 88-389-2453-8
- L'intermittenza (2010) ISBN 978-88-04-59842-8
- The Revolution of the Moon (2017) La rivoluzione della luna (2013) ISBN 9788838930140
- Noli me tangere (2016) ISBN 978-88-04-66187-0
- Ora dimmi di te (2018) ISBN 978-88-4529-7755, Háblame de ti. Carta a Matilda (Spanish) ISBN 978-8498389692
