= The Scent of the Night =

2001 novel by Andrea Camilleri

- First edition (Italy)
- Author: Andrea Camilleri
- Original title: L'odore della notte
- Translator: Stephen Sartarelli
- Language: Italian/Sicilian
- Series: Inspector Salvo Montalbano, #6
- Genre: Crime, Mystery novel
- Publisher: Macmillan/Picador
- Publication date: 28 June 2001
- Publication place: Italy, Sicily
- English publication date: 2005
- Media type: Print (Hardcover, Paperback)
- ISBN: 0-330-44217-1 (Eng. trans.)
- OCLC: 71347307
- Preceded by: Excursion to Tindari
- Followed by: Rounding the Mark

The Scent of the Night (Italian: L'odore della notte) is a 2001 novel by Andrea Camilleri, translated into English in 2005 by Stephen Sartarelli. It is the sixth novel in the Inspector Montalbano series.

== Plot summary ==
Inspector Montalbano must track down a lost financial manager who seems to have absconded with all of his clients' money. Along the way, he encounters a lovelorn secretary who believes her boss could do no wrong.

== Trivia ==
The novel openly cites Faulkner's short story, "A Rose for Emily".
