= Salvo Montalbano =

Fictional character by Andrea Camilleri

- Inspector Montalbano character
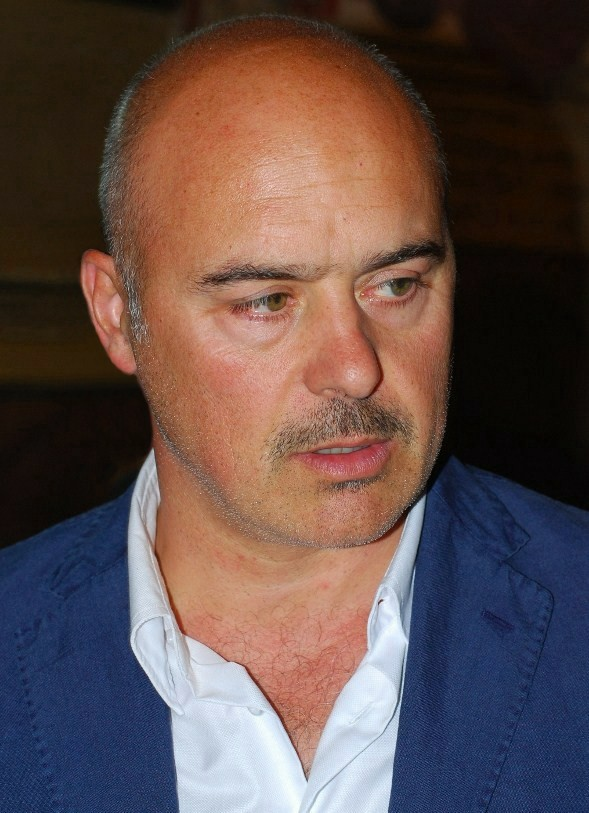
- Luca Zingaretti, who plays Salvo Montalbano in the TV series
- First appearance: The Shape of Water (La forma dell'acqua)
- Last appearance: Riccardino
- Created by: Andrea Camilleri
- Portrayed by: Luca Zingaretti (in Inspector Montalbano); Michele Riondino (in The Young Montalbano)

In-universe information
- Gender: Male
- Occupation: Police detective
- Significant other: Livia Burlando
- Nationality: Italian
- Born: 6 September 1950

Inspector (Note: Italian: commissario, the chief of a precinct or station of the Italian national police, i.e. a commissariato.) Salvo Montalbano is a fictional police chief and detective created by Italian writer Andrea Camilleri in a series of novels and short stories. The books were written in a mixture of standard Italian, strict Sicilian, and Sicilian Italian.

== Overview ==
The detective's character encapsulates astute detective work and a fractious manner. Inspector Montalbano is an engaging hero – honest, decent and loyal. He has his own way of doing things, and his superiors regard him as something of a loose cannon. One of the strengths of the novels is Montalbano's ability to navigate through a murky world of shady connections and favours owed and owing, without compromising himself beyond what he can live with. There is a great deal of humour in his character, such as his unconditional love for silence while enjoying a good meal, but the primary subtext is hard criticism of the social and political situation of both the Sicilian and Italian contexts. Camilleri has said that social commentary "was always my aim. In many crime novels, the events seem completely detached from the economic, political and social context in which they occur... In my books, I deliberately decided to smuggle into a detective novel a critical commentary on my times. This also allowed me to show the progression and evolution in the character of Montalbano."

He is the chief of the police station (Italian: commissario) of the fictional town of Vigata. In this role he balances the demands of his superiors and the realities of local crime and life in general. A determining factor of his success as a Sicilian policeman seems to be his ability to bridge different cultures. On one side, there is the "northern" force from Rome and Milan, which attempts to standardize regulations and increase transparency; on the opposite side is the "southern" culture with complex webs of relationships that affect the way things are done. Montalbano excels at balancing these two while being true to his principles.

Although the Inspector Montalbano series of novels is set in Sicily, Camilleri uncompromisingly confronts many contemporary political and social problems.

The novels have been translated into a number of languages. The English translations, by Stephen Sartarelli, began after five novels had been published in Italian and gained popularity among the Italian-speaking public. Sartarelli has attempted to maintain the mixture of Italian and Sicilian language in the dialogues. In addition, he has added notes at the end of each of the novels, which give short explanations regarding many of the peculiarities of Sicilian and Italian society depicted in the novels.

The name Montalbano is a homage to the Spanish writer Manuel Vázquez Montalbán. There are similarities between Montalbán's Pepe Carvalho and Camilleri's fictional detective, as both writers make great play of their protagonists' gastronomic preferences, but also notable differences reflecting different inspirational life experiences.

According to the novel A Voice in the Night, chapter 1, Montalbano was born on 6 September 1950.

== Location ==
Inspector Montalbano lives and works in the fictional town of "Vigàta", in the similarly fictional province of "Montelusa". Camilleri based Vigata on his home town of Porto Empedocle, on Sicily's south-west coast, while Montelusa, the province headquarters, is based on Agrigento.

In 2009, a statue of the inspector, commissioned by the then-mayor, was placed in the centrally located Via Roma in Porto Empedocle Giuseppe Agnello. It does not resemble the Montalbano depicted in the TV series, picturing him with his hand on a lamppost, wrinkles and a full head of hair, as described in Camilleri's books.

== TV series ==
Since 1999, RAI has produced a television series based on the novels, called in Italian, Il commissario Montalbano. Montalbano is played by Luca Zingaretti. The series is shot almost entirely in the Sicilian city of Ragusa and surrounding towns. The seaside and harbour locations were at Punta Secca and Licata. The series has aired, with English subtitles, on the MHz Worldview television network under the "MHz Networks International Mysteries" banner for several years.

In 2012, Rai 1 broadcast a prequel series, Il giovane Montalbano (The Young Montalbano) , starring Michele Riondino as Montalbano.

== Reception ==
Camilleri's writings have enjoyed, and still enjoy, considerable success in Italy and abroad. Montalbano personifies Camilleri's writing style and is therefore at the core of this success, so much so that the evident resemblance between Porto Empedocle and Vigàta prompted the city of Porto Empedocle to rename itself "Porto Empedocle Vigàta" in 2003, although the decision was reversed in 2009.

== Bibliography ==
=== Novels ===
1. The Shape of Water — 2002 (La forma dell'acqua — 1994)
2. The Terracotta Dog — 2002 (Il cane di terracotta — 1996)
3. The Snack Thief — 2003 (Il ladro di merendine — 1996)
4. The Voice of the Violin — 2003 (La voce del violino — 1997)
5. Excursion to Tindari — 2005 (La gita a Tindari — 2000)
6. The Scent of the Night — 2005 (L'odore della notte — 2001)
7. Rounding the Mark — 2006 (Il giro di boa — 2003)
8. The Patience of the Spider — 2007 (La pazienza del ragno — 2004)
9. The Paper Moon — 2008 (La luna di carta — 2005)
10. August Heat — 2009 (La vampa d'agosto — 2006)
11. The Wings of the Sphinx — 2009 (Le ali della sfinge — 2006)
12. The Track of Sand — 2010 (La pista di sabbia — 2007)
13. The Potters Field — 2011 (Il campo del vasaio — 2008)
14. The Age of Doubt — 2012 (L'età del dubbio — 2008)
15. The Dance Of The Seagull — 2013 (La danza del gabbiano — 2009)
16. The Treasure Hunt — 2013 (La caccia al tesoro — 2010)
17. Angelica's Smile — 2014 (Il sorriso di Angelica — 2010)
18. Game of Mirrors — 2015 (Il gioco degli specchi — 2011)
19. A Beam of Light — 2015 (Una lama di luce — 2012)
20. A Voice in the Night — 2016 (Una voce di notte — 2012)
21. A Nest of Vipers — 2017 (Un covo di vipere — 2013)
22. The Pyramid of Mud — 2018 (La piramide di fango — 2014)
23. The Overnight Kidnapper — 2019 (La giostra degli scambi — 2015)
24. The Other End of the Line — 2019 (L'altro capo del filo — 2016)
25. The Safety Net — 2020 (La rete di protezione — 2017)
26. The Sicilian Method — 2020 (Il metodo Catalanotti — 2018)
27. The Cook of the Halcyon – 2021 (Il cuoco dell'Alcyon — 2019)
28. Riccardino – 2022 (Riccardino — 2020)

=== Collections of short stories ===
- Un mese con Montalbano (1998)
- Gli arancini di Montalbano (1999)
- La paura di Montalbano (2002)
- La prima indagine di Montalbano (2004) (Montalbano's First Case, 2013)
- Morte in mare aperto e altre indagini del giovane Montalbano (2014) (Death at Sea: Montalbano's Early Cases, 2018)
- La coscienza di Montalbano (2022)

=== Anthologies of short stories ===
- Racconti di Montalbano (2008) (Montalbano's First Case and Other Stories, 2016)

=== Anthologies of novels ===
- Il commissario Montalbano. Le prime indagini (2008)
- Ancora tre indagini per il commissario Montalbano (2009)
- Altri casi per il commissario Montalbano (2011)

== See also ==
- Scala dei Turchi
