= Luca Zingaretti =

Italian actor (born 1961)

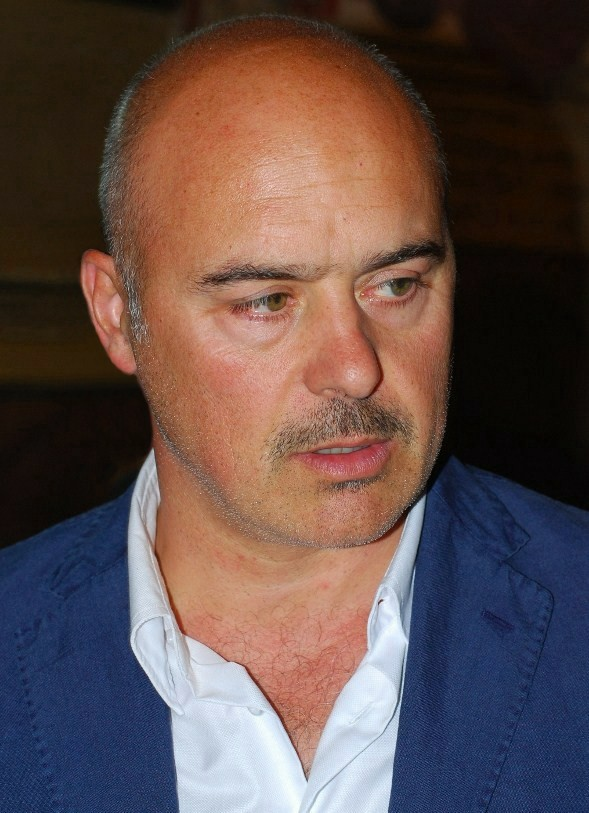
- Luca Zingaretti in 2010
- Born: 11 November 1961 (age 64); Rome, Italy
- Occupations: Actor; film director
- Years active: 1984–present
- Height: 1.65 m (5 ft 5 in)
- Spouses: Margherita D'Amico (m. 1997; div. 2008) Luisa Ranieri (m. 2012)
- Children: 2

Luca Zingaretti (Italian pronunciation: [ˈluːka ddziŋɡaˈretti]; born 11 November 1961) is an Italian actor and film director, known for playing Salvo Montalbano in the Inspector Montalbano mystery series based on the character and novels created by Andrea Camilleri. Zingaretti is a native of Rome, and the older brother of politician Nicola Zingaretti.

== Life and career ==
Of Jewish origins on his maternal side, at the age of 17 he joined Rimini Football Club, but abandoned his career as a footballer after a few months in order to attend the National Academy of Dramatic Art Silvio D' Amico.

In 2004 he separated from his first wife, the journalist and writer Margherita D'Amico, niece of Suso Cecchi D'Amico; they divorced in 2008. In 2005 he became romantically linked with the actress Luisa Ranieri, whom he met on the set of the television mini-series Cefalonia, and with whom he has two daughters, born in 2011 and 2015 respectively. The couple married on 23 June 2012 in a civil ceremony at the Donnafugata castle in Sicily.

Zingaretti graduated from the National Academy of Dramatic Art Silvio D' Amico in 1984 and began his acting career in the theatre, often working with director Luca Ronconi, appearing in such diverse plays as Chekhov's Three Sisters, Shakespeare's Titus Andronicus, and Martin Sherman's Bent.

Zingaretti made his film debut in 1987 with a minor role in Gli occhiali d'oro ("The Gold-Rimmed Glasses") — directed by Giuliano Montaldo — and in the same year first appeared on television in Il Giudice Istruttore ("The Investigating Magistrate)", directed by Florestano Vancini and Gianluigi Calderone. He first gained critical attention with his role as the ferocious "Ottorino" in Marco Risi's 1994 film Il branco ("The Wolf Pack"). In 1996 he starred with Sabrina Ferilli in the film Vite strozzate ("Strangled Lives"), directed by Ricky Tognazzi.

However, stardom arrived with his leading role as Commissario Salvo Montalbano, in the Inspector Montalbano series of TV films, initially shown on RAI Two, and then RAI One, as well as many other European TV channels and SBS in Australia. The series, which started running from 1999 and is still ongoing, consists of 36 films through 2020.

After his success he became one of the most in-demand dramatic actors in Italy appearing in such films as:

- Prima dammi un bacio ("First Give Me a Kiss") (2003), dir. Ambrogio Lo Giudice
- I giorni dell'abbandono ("Days of Abandonment") (2005), dir. Roberto Faenza
- Tutte le donne della mia vita ("All The Women Of My Life") (2007), dir. Simona Izzo

On TV he appeared in :

- Perlasca – Un eroe Italiano ("Perlasca : An Italian Hero") (2002)
- Doppio agguato ("Double Ambush") (2003)
- Cefalonia ("Kefalonia") (2005)
- Alla luce del sole ("To The Sunlight") (2005), a film on the life of Don Pino Puglisi.

In 2008 he appeared in four new Montalbano films, and in the same period adapted and directed the play La Sirena, from a story by Giuseppe Tomasi di Lampedusa.

In 2009 he continued to appear in the theatre and also worked on the film We Believed, directed by Mario Martone, and set during the reunification of Italy in which he played Francesco Crispi. He also appeared in the film Il figlio più piccolo ("The Younger Son"), directed by Pupi Avati and co-starring Christian De Sica.

In 2010 four new Montalbano episodes were produced, broadcast by RAI One on 14 March 2011 and the three following Mondays.

Between 2011 and 2012 he was in the cast of the comedies Immaturi - Il viaggio, dir. Paolo Genovese and Il comandante e la cicogna (Garibaldi's Lovers), dir. Silvio Soldini. He was among the stars of the international production Asterix & Obelix in the service of His Majesty, dir. Laurent Tirard in which he played a Roman general, and participated in a minor role in Romanzo di una strage – (Piazza Fontana: The Italian Conspiracy), dir. Marco Tullio Giordana. Also in 2012, he starred in two television films about two characters from twentieth century Italian history. First was Paolo Borsellino - I 57 giorni – (Paolo Borsellino - the 57 Days), dir. Alberto Negrin, made on the occasion of the twentieth anniversary of the death of Giovanni Falcone, while the latter told the life of the industrialist Adriano Olivetti - La forza di un sogno – (Adriano Olivetti - the Strength of a Dream), dir. Michele Soavi. In 2014 he starred in the film in Maldamore, dir. Angelo Longoni, with his wife, Luisa Ranieri, Alessio Boni, Claudia Gerini and Ambra Angiolini, and in Perez., dir. Edoardo De Angelis, together with Marco D'Amore; moreover the same year he returned to TV with the mini-series Il giudice meschino – (The Indolent Judge), dir. Carlo Carlei, with his wife.

In 2013 another four episodes of Montalbano were broadcast by RAI One, and two more each year from 2016 through 2020.

== Filmography ==
=== Films ===
Year	Title	Role	Notes
1984	One Hundred Days in Palermo	Police officer	Cameo appearance
1987	The Gold Rimmed Glasses	Molon	
1993	E quando morì lei fu lutto nazionale	Raffaele	
1993	Abissinia	Marco	
1994	Il branco	Ottorino	
1994	No Skin	Luca	
1995	L'anno prossimo vado a letto alle dieci	Police officer	Cameo appearance
1995	Castle Freak	Forte	
1996	Strangled Lives	Sergio	
1997	I colori del diavolo	Marc Lauzon	
1997	Artemisia	Cosimo Quorli	
1998	Rewind	Joseph Valko	
1998	You Laugh	Gino Migliori	
1999	L'anniversario	Michele	
1999	Oltremare - Non è l'America	Nicola	
2002	The Good War	Luigi Manin	
2002	Sei come sei	Bryant	Segment: "Una specie di appuntamento"
2003	Kiss Me First	Loris	
2003	Finding Nemo	Marlin (voice)	Italian dub; voice role
2005	Come into the Light	Giuseppe Puglisi	
2005	I giorni dell'abbandono	Mario	
2006	Don't Make Any Plans for Tonight	Andrea	
2006	Our Country	Ugo	
2007	Tutte le donne della mia vita	Marco Ferrero	
2007	My Brother Is an Only Child	Mario Nastri	
2008	Wild Blood	Osvaldo Valenti	
2010	The Youngest Son	Sergio Bollino	
2010	We Believed	Francesco Crispi	
2010	La nostra vita	Ari	
2011	Kryptonite!	Antonio Sansone	
2011	Mozzarella Stories	Giulio Ricci	
2012	The Immature: The Trip	Carlo	
2012	Garibaldi's Lovers	Avvocato Malaffanno	
2012	Asterix and Obelix: God Save Britannia	Général	
2012	Piazza Fontana: The Italian Conspiracy	Doctor Tribunale	
2014	Maldamore	Marco	
2014	Perez.	Demetrio Perez	
2014	Andrea Camilleri - Il maestro senza regole	Himself	Documentary
2014	Nicholas on Holiday	Massimo Massini	
2015	Partly Cloudy with Sunny Spells	Giacomo	
2016	Finding Dory	Marlin (voice)	Italian dub; voice role
2018	Il vegetale	Armando	
2018	Boys Cry	Angelo	
2019	Tuttapposto	Ruggero Lipari	
2019	Thanks!	Annalisa	
2020	Rose Island	Giovanni Leone	
2021	Encanto	Bruno Madrigal (voice)	Italian dub

=== Television ===
Year	Title	Role	Notes
1988	Poliziotti	Agent Buffi	Television movie
1991	A Private Affair	Sceriff	Television movie
1991	Un bambino in fuga - Tre anni dopo	Corrado	Episode: "Episode 2"
1993	I ragazzi del muretto	Father Vittorio	Episode: "I ragazzi di S.O.S. casa"
1994	L'ombra della sera	Policeman	Television movie
1996	Dio vede e provvede	Italo	Main role (season 1); 7 episodes
1997	La piovra 8 - Lo scandalo	Pietro Favignana	Miniseries
1998	Kidnapping - La sfida	Tonino Sanna	Television movie
1999	Jesus	Saint Peter	Television movie
1999–2021	Inspector Montalbano	Inspector Salvo Montalbano	Lead role
2000	Operazione Odissea	Paolo "Omero" Cecchini	Miniseries
2000	Il furto del tesoro	Giovanni Marotta	Miniseries
2002	Perlasca – Un eroe Italiano	Giorgio Perlasca	Miniseries
2002	Incompreso	Edoardo Quaratesi	Television movie
2003	Doppio agguato	NOCS Commander Valerio Attico	Miniseries
2005	Cefalonia	Saverio Blasco	Miniseries
2012	Paolo Borsellino – I 57 giorni	Paolo Borsellino	Television movie
2013	Adriano Olivetti - La forza di un sogno	Adriano Olivetti	Miniseries
2014	Il giudice meschino	Alberto Lenzi	Miniseries
2019	1994	Paolo Mieli	Episode: "Episode Six"
2022	Il re	Bruno Testori	Lead role

=== Others ===
Year	Title	Role	Notes
2000	Gulu	Director	Docoumentary film
2019	Raro	Director, Producer	Short film
2020–2021	Inspector Montalbano	Director	Episodes: "Salvo amato, Livia mia", "La rete di protezione", "Il metodo Catalanotti"
2021–present	Lolita Lobosco	Producer	TV series

== Director ==
- (2000) Gulu - Documentary
- (2007) Passa una vela... spingendo la notte più in là - Play
- (2007) Conversazioni con Suso - Documentary
- (2008) La Sirena - Play
- (2013) La torre d'avorio - Play
- (2015) The Pride - Play
- (2018) The Deep Blue Sea - Play

== Voiceovers ==
- (2003) Finding Nemo, dir. Andrew Stanton and Lee Unkrich - voice of Marlin in Italian version
- (2006) La Grande Finale, Official documentary of the 2006 FIFA World Cup - narrator
- (2010) L'altra verità (Route Irish), dir. Ken Loach - voice of Fergus (Mark Womack)
- (2016) Finding Dory, dir. Andrew Stanton and Angus MacLane - voice of Marlin in Italian version
- (2016) Le confessioni, dir. Roberto Andò - voice of Daniel Roché (Daniel Auteuil)

== Theatre ==
- La Sirena, from the story "Lighea" by Giuseppe Tomasi di Lampedusa, adapted by Luca Zingaretti
- Saint Joan by George Bernard Shaw, dir. Luca Ronconi
- Le due commedie in commedia by Giambattista Andreini, dir. Luca Ronconi
- Bent by Martin Sherman, dir. Marco Mattolini
- I villeggianti and La madre by Maxim Gorky, dir. Sandro Sequi
- Come gocce su pietre roventi by Rainer Werner Fassbinder, dir. Marco Mattolini
- The Fairy Queen by F. Pourcell, dir. Luca Ronconi
- Three Sisters by Anton Chekhov, dir. Luca Ronconi
- Murder in the Cathedral by T. S. Eliot, dir. Franco Branciaroli
- Titus Andronicus by William Shakespeare, dir. Peter Stein
- The Last Days of Mankind by Karl Kraus, dir. Luca Ronconi
- The Madwoman of Chaillot by Jean Giraudoux, dir. Luca Ronconi
- Crimes of the Heart by Beth Henley, dir. Nanni Loy
- The Break of Noon by Paul Claudel, dir. Franco Però
- Trompe l'oeil by Cagnoni, Camilli, Martelli, dir. Federico Cagnoni
- Maratona di New York by Edoardo Erba, dir. Edoardo Erba
- The Prisoners of War by J. R. Ackerley, dir. Luca Zingaretti and Fabio Ferrari
- Line by Al Horowitz, dir. Piero Maccarinelli
- Cannibal by Richard Crowe and Richard Zajdlic, dir. Patrick Rossi Gastaldi
- Separation by Tom Kempinski, dir. Patrick Rossi Gastaldi
- Three Hotels, by Jon Robin Baitz, dir. Toni Bertorelli
- Confortate il male antico, by Gianclaudio Mantovani, dir. Luca Zingaretti
- The Ivory Tower, by Ronald Harwood, dir. Luca Zingaretti
- The Pride, by Alexi Kaye Campbell, dir. Luca Zingaretti

== Awards ==

- In 2003 Zingaretti was made a Knight of the Order of Merit of the Republic.

- (2004) Archivio Disarmo - Golden Doves for Peace Prize from IRIAD.
- (2004) Nastro d'Argento for Best Dubbing for the voice of Marlin in Finding Nemo (Italian version)
- (2005) David di Donatello for Best Actor Award for Alla luce del sole
- (2005) Karlovy Vary Best Actor Award for Alla luce del sole
- (2008) Middle East International Film Festival Black Pearl for Best Actor for Sangue pazzo
- (2010) Nastro d'Argento ("Silver Ribbon") as Best Supporting Actor for Il figlio più piccolo and La nostra vita.
