= Stephen Sartarelli =

American poet and translator (born 1954)

Stephen Sartarelli (born 1954 in Youngstown, Ohio) is an American poet and translator.

== Life ==
Sartarelli graduated from Antioch College and New York University. Specializing in translations from French and Italian into English, he has translated the popular Inspector Montalbano series of detective novels written by the Italian writer Andrea Camilleri.

Sartarelli lives in France with his wife.

== Awards ==
- 1984 Poggioli Translation Award for Horcynus Orca by Stefano D'Arrigo
- 2001 Raiziss/de Palchi Translation Award from The Academy of American Poets for Songbook: The Selected Poems of Umberto Saba.

== Works ==
=== Poetry ===
- "Seasons of Mars". New Arcadia Review.
- "Lament for the Bamiyan Buddhas". Titanic Operas. Archived from the original on 2010-07-15.
- "Openings, Endings". Titanic Operas. Archived from the original on 2010-07-15.
- The Open Vault. Spuyten Duyvil. 2001. ISBN 978-1-881471-52-3.
- The Runaway Woods. Spuyten Duyvil. 2000. ISBN 978-1-881471-45-5.
- Grievances and Other Poems. Gnosis Press. 1989. ISBN 978-0-922792-04-7.

=== Essays ===
- "Where Did Our Love Go?". The Nation. December 24, 2003.

=== Translations ===
==== Poetry ====
- Nanni Cagnone, The Book of Giving Back (Edgewise Press, 1997),
- Umberto Saba (1998). Songbook: Selected Poems from the Canzoniere. Translator Stephen Sartarelli. Sheep Meadow Press. ISBN 978-1-878818-52-2.
- Pasolini, Pier Paolo (2014). The Selected Poetry of Pier Paolo Pasolini. The University of Chicago Press. p. 494. ISBN 978-0-226-64844-6.

==== Prose ====
- Death in Florence, by Marco Vichi (Hodder & Stoughton, 2013)
- Prince of the Clouds, by Gianni Riotta (Farrar, Straus & Giroux, 2000).
- The Plague-Sower, by Gesualdo Bufalino (1988).
- The House on Moon Lake, by Francesca Duranti (1985).
- Andrea Camilleri (2007). The Patience of the Spider. Translator Stephen Sartarelli. Penguin. ISBN 978-0-14-311203-7.
- Andrea Camilleri (2002). The Shape of Water. Translator Stephen Sartarelli. Viking. ISBN 978-0-670-03092-7.
- Roberto Calasso (1994). The Ruin of Kasch. Translator William Weaver, Stephen Sartarelli. Harvard University Press. ISBN 978-0-674-78026-2. "Stephen Sartarelli."
- Laurent Gaudé (2008). The House of Scorta. Translator Stephen Sartarelli, Sophie Hawkes. Random House, Inc. ISBN 978-0-385-66357-1.
- Giacomo Casanova (2001). The Story of My Life. Translator Stephen Sartarelli, Sophie Hawkes. Penguin Classics. ISBN 978-0-14-043915-1.
