= A. D. G. =

French novelist and journalist

A.D.G.
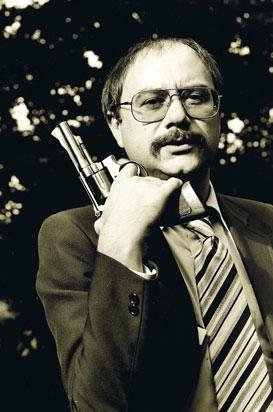
- A.D.G. in 1991
- Born: Alain Fournier; December 19, 1947; Tours, France
- Died: November 1, 2004 (aged 56); Paris, France
- Resting place: Véretz, France
- Other names: Alain Camille; Alain Dreux-Gallou
- Occupations: Novelist; journalist
- Years active: 1966–2004
- Spouse: Martine Joulié (m. 2004)

Alain Camille (né Fournier; December 19, 1947 – November 1, 2004), known by his pen name A.D.G. (the initials of Alain Dreux-Gallou), was a French novelist and journalist.

For about ten years, A.D.G. was one of the leading authors of the Série Noire collection published by Gallimard. He represented a right-wing, even far-right, political sensibility—a stance that became more pronounced in the 1980s when he became the main organizer for the National Front (a political party) in New Caledonia. This position set him apart within the French noir fiction revival of the 1970s, a movement largely dominated by writers with leftist, far-left, or anarchist leanings, such as Jean-Patrick Manchette, another prominent figure of the Série Noire during that decade. Whether in the titles of his crime novels or in his journalistic columns, A.D.G. was also known for his fondness for wordplay.

== Life ==
A.D.G. was born on December 19, 1947, in Tours, France. After joining a military boarding school at the age of twelve and leaving the school system with only a BEPC (lower secondary education certificate), he began working life as an employee at Crédit Lyonnais (a former French bank). He then went on to work as a secondhand bookseller and antiques dealer.

For some time, he was close to the polemicist Michel-Georges Micberth, who led the Jeune Force Poétique Française (JFPF; Young French Poetic Force), and became his collaborator and literary director at the JFPF publishing house (from 1966 to 1971), where he wrote under the pseudonym "Alain Dreux-Gallou"—Dreux and Gallou being the surnames of two of his grandparents. His real name posed difficulties for use in literature, due to its similarity to that of the well-known author Alain-Fournier, so he kept the initials of his pseudonym—A.D.G., always written with three periods—as his pen name. He considered switching to the name Alain Camille, but quickly reverted to his original signature and adopted Camille as his legal name, as he found his birth name too burdensome.

His first novel, La Divine Surprise, was inspired by Jo Attia, a gangster and resistance fighter whose biography he was ghostwriting at the time. Due to the mystery surrounding A.D.G.'s true identity, some imaginative journalists once speculated that A.D.G. was a pseudonym for Raymond Queneau, while others believed the book to be the memoirs of a former gangster turned writer.

In his novels, unlike other authors of the Série Noire, A.D.G. deliberately avoided glorifying the criminal underworld, which he considered to be made up of "dim-witted, foolish, and inconsistent idiots who ride on the fame that writers like Auguste Le Breton and José Giovanni have created for them." An admirer of Albert Simonin, A.D.G. sprinkled his early novels—particularly Les Panadeux—with slang expressions. He signed each of his novels by including a reference to the polemicist Paul-Louis Courier, a monument to whom has stood in the main square of the French commune Véretz since 1878.

In 1972, A.D.G. published a Berrichon chronicle titled La Nuit des grands chiens malades, which was adapted into a film by Georges Lautner under the title Quelques messieurs trop tranquilles. The story features a hippie commune settling in a small village and clashing with a gang of criminals, eventually teaming up with local farmers. This story was followed by three works: a subtle tribute to Louis-Ferdinand Céline, Cradoque's Band; a heist story, Les Trois Badours, published under the pseudonym Alain Camille; and a return to the Berry region with Berry story. In 1977, A.D.G. won the Mystère de la critique prize for the novel L'otage est sans pitié. That same year, he wrote Le Grand Môme, which imagines the character Augustin's return to his lost homeland—a work that serves as both a tribute to and a parody of the novel Le Grand Meaulnes by Alain-Fournier.

In Pour venger pépère (1980), a suspense novel that Jean-Patrick Manchette described as "very coherent, very accomplished, excellent", a young lawyer from the Tours bar investigates the death of his grandfather, who was killed during a shootout. A background character, the alcoholic, anarchist-leaning journalist Sergueï Djerbitskine, also known as "Machin", was partly inspired by A.D.G.'s friend Serge de Beketch, but also became a stand-in for A.D.G. himself in the novels set in New Caledonia.

In 1981, he tried his hand at a short 100-page novel, La Nuit myope, which Jean Cochet described as "one hundred percent literary" and "a kind of pathetic epic of a half-hearted dreamer". Between late 1981 and early 1982, A.D.G. gained notoriety by appearing on the first episodes of the TV show Droit de réponse. During the first broadcast, he shouted "Long live Pinochet!"; in the third episode, during an off-air break, he punched the cartoonist Siné, who had insulted another Minute journalist present on set.

In 1982, A.D.G. moved to New Caledonia, where he began writing a historical novel about the island's colonization, Le Grand Sud, which became a success upon its release in 1987. While on the island, A.D.G. also engaged in intense political activism against the Kanak independence movement. He launched an anti-independence weekly newspaper and took charge of organizing the local branches of the National Front. His political militancy—which led to police custody and contributed to his poor reputation in mainland France—caused him to neglect his literary work. As a result, he abandoned plans for a sequel to Le Grand Sud; between 1987 and 1991, he wrote only three crime novels containing attacks on the independence movement—books he did not consider to be very good.

He returned to Metropolitan France in 1991. Struggling with a creative block, he was unable to regain the motivation to publish new novels and spent a period unemployed after being dismissed from Minute. He was the only prominent author of the Série Noire not to be reissued during the collection's 50th anniversary in 1997. In 2003, he returned to crime fiction with a new novel set in Australia, Kangouroad Movie. Patrick Raynal, then director of the Série Noire, published the book in the La Noire collection.

In 2007, A.D.G.'s final novel, J'ai déjà donné..., was published posthumously by Le Dilettante. It serves as a kind of fictional apotheosis, bringing together the main characters from his earlier novels.

He married Martine Joulié in July 2004, shortly before his death.

== Journalism ==
A.D.G. worked as a journalist in right-leaning publications, including the socialist, Gaullist, and right-wing anarchist press:

- 1966: freelance contributor for Réveil socialiste, run by former Socialist minister Jean Meunier
- 1968: editor-in-chief of Révolution 70
- 1972–1973: columnist at Actual-Hebdo

Later, he worked with the far-right press in various roles:

- 1973–1981: journalist, columnist, and eventually senior reporter for the weekly Minute
- 1980s: founder of Combat calédonien, an anti-independence weekly in New Caledonia, where he lived from 1981 to 1991. His one-year participation in this press venture led to several fines and convictions. A.D.G. eventually gave up, while Combat calédonien's main target, Edgard Pisani, also came out somewhat battered by the ordeal.
- 1991–1994: columnist at Minute
- After 1994: member of the editorial team at the far-right weekly Rivarol, becoming its secretary-general in 1998. He continued working there for another year, until worsening illness forced him to step back. He also contributed to Le Figaro littéraire in 2003–2004.

== Other work ==
A.D.G. also wrote comic book scripts, notably for the monthly magazine Pilote, as well as television serials: Chéri Bibi, adapted from the novel by Gaston Leroux and aired in 1973; and Les Mystères de New York, written in collaboration with Jean-Pierre Richard and aired in 1976.

In 1981, A.D.G. was at the center of a minor scandal following the publication—in a special issue of the magazine À suivre—of a comic titled Léopold Micheteau, détective, for which he was the scriptwriter and Benoît Sokal the illustrator. Some readers perceived antisemitic elements in the work, prompting the magazine's editors to publish an embarrassed editorial a few weeks later offering their apologies. However, the appearance of the Jewish characters was solely the result of Sokal's illustrations and had nothing to do with A.D.G.'s script.

== Death ==
A.D.G. died from cancer in 2004, in the 10th arrondissement of Paris. Before his illness worsened, he had been planning to write an essay on the writer Jacques Perret. A year before his predicted death, A.D.G. expressed a wish to be buried in Véretz, telling the newspaper La Nouvelle République du Centre-Ouest: "I've reserved my spot in the Véretz cemetery; that'll make three writers for the price of one, with Paul-Louis Courier and Eugène Bizeau."

His funeral, held on November 5, 2004, at the Saint-Eugène Sainte-Cécile Church in Paris before his burial in his hometown of Véretz, brought together various figures from the "national right", who had been divided since the crisis within the Front National in 1998–1999. Among those attending were Jean-Marie Le Pen, president of the Front National, and Serge Martinez, secretary-general of the splinter Front National; Marine Le Pen and her older sister Marie-Caroline Le Pen, both of whom had been involved in the "Mégrétiste" faction; as well as other notable personalities such as Emmanuel Ratier, Yann Clerc, Dominique Jamet, and Jean Raspail.

== Literary friendships ==
The cordial relationship between A.D.G. and Frédéric H. Fajardie, another noir fiction author, was recalled after Fajardie's death on May 1, 2008, by writer Jérôme Leroy in an article published on May 10, 2008, in the weekly magazine Marianne, titled "Fajardie: Death of a Red Bernanosian". Leroy wrote: "Even though he was becoming a cult author for many young royalist hussars, and even though he was friends with A.D.G., Fajardie remained a 'writer of the streets'".

In contrast, the exact nature of the relationship between A.D.G. and Jean-Patrick Manchette appears more complex. For several years, particularly in political circles sympathetic to A.D.G.'s views, there was a rumor of a supposed long-standing friendship between the two. This claim was reiterated on June 6, 2008, by Sébastien Lapaque, on the occasion of a censored edition of A.D.G.'s columns published in Libre Journal de la France courtoise. On that date, Lapaque stated that, in his view,

The two men had just met in the offices of the Série Noire and had formed a paradoxical friendship that never wavered. They even maintained a correspondence that the leftist mafia of politically correct crime fiction is in no hurry to unearth. In it, Manchette admits to reading Minute with pleasure.

This version was strongly refuted by Doug Headline, Jean-Patrick Manchette's son. He noted that Sébastien Lapaque was a "former activist of the far-right student movement Action Française lycéenne and contributor to the royalist journal Action Française hebdo", and asserted, in an op-ed published by Libération, that the relationship between the two authors did not extend beyond the 1972–1977 period. This assertion is also supported by academic Bertrand Tassou. According to Headline, their connection was limited to their collaboration within the Série Noire, limited to about ten letters and ending in a falling-out.

== Comments ==
Bernard Antony described A.D.G. as an "anarcho-reactionary" and a "Céline-style legitimist royalist" who, nevertheless, "was not always, in his novels, a transmitter of the Church's social and moral doctrine."

The sociologist Gabriel Thoveron writes:

A.D.G. is a nationalist, anti-parliamentarian, with heroes like the lawyer Pascal Delcroix, who can say that his friend Machin 'was the correspondent in Tours for a nationalist newspaper, and as for me, I had delightedly joined the sparse ranks of a monarchist party with legitimist leanings' (Pour venger Pépère). But A.D.G., at times ambiguous, claims in his own way to place himself within the spirit of the May '68 movement.

== Works ==
- 1969: Open Letter to a Little Magistrate (Micberth, illustrations by Bernard Deyriès)
- 1971: The Divine Surprise (Gallimard, "Série Noire" collection, no. 1429; reissued in "Carré Noir" collection, no. 545)
- 1971: The Panadeux (Gallimard, "Série Noire" collection, no. 1443; reissued in "Carré Noir" collection, no. 518)
- 1972: The Truque March... (Gallimard, "Série Noire" collection, no. 1473; reissued in "Carré Noir" collection, no. 554)
- 1972: The Night of the Big Sick Dogs (Gallimard, "Série Noire" collection, no. 1482; reissued in "Carré Noir" collection, no. 197 under the title Quelques messieurs trop tranquilles; reissued in "Folio" collection, no. 2224)—adapted into a film titled Quelques messieurs trop tranquilles
- 1972: Cradoque's Band (Gallimard, "Série Noire" collection, no. 1493; reissued in "Carré Noir" collection, no. 373)
- 1972: The Three Badours (Gallimard, "Série Noire" collection, no. 1544; reissued in "Folio Policier" collection, no. 229)—For the first edition, A.D.G. used the pseudonym Alain Camille.
- 1973: Berry Story (Gallimard, "Série Noire" collection, no. 1586)
- 1974: Our brother who is odious... (Gallimard, "Série Noire" collection, no. 1662; reissued in "Carré Noir" collection, no. 566; reissued in "Folio Policier" collection, no. 171)
- 1974: I am a dark novel (Gallimard, "Série Noire" collection, no. 1692, reissued in the "Carré Noir" collection, no. 468)
- 1976: The hostage is merciless (Gallimard, "Super Noire" collection, no. 43; Mystery Critics' Prize shared with Enfantasme by Georges-Jean Arnaud)
- 1977: The Big Kid (Gallimard, "Série Noire" collection, no. 1717)—A title that was a subtle tribute to his namesake Alain-Fournier. Adapted as the sixteenth TV film in the crime anthology series Série noire, broadcast on TF1 in 1985.
- 1977: Just a joker (Gallimard, "Série Noire" collection, no. 1721; reissued in "Carré Noir" collection, no. 506)
- 1980: To avenge grandpa (Gallimard, "Série Noire" collection, no. 1806; reissued in "Folio Policier" collection, no. 153)
- 1980: The Investigations of Inspector Alfred Beaugat (Dargaud, "Pilote" collection)—Script by A.D.G., illustrations by Loro and North
- 1981: The Myopic Night (Balland, "L'Instant romanesque" collection; reissued in 2003 by Christian Durante, "Poche-numérique" collection)
- 1981: Black Bullets (Gallimard, "Série Noire" collection, no. 1825)
- 1982: We are not dogs (Gallimard, "Série Noire" collection, no. 1862; reissued in "Folio Policier" collection, no. 189)
- 1987: Toys on the rock (Gallimard, "Série Noire" collection, no. 2089)—a "Caledonian novel" of political fiction
- 1987: The Great South (Jean-Claude Lattès)—a New Caledonian adventure novel
- 1988: Nickel-Plated Tickets (Gallimard, "Série Noire" collection, no. 2124)
- 1988: It's the galleys! (Gallimard, "Série Noire" collection, no. 2134)
- 2003: Kangouroad Movie (Gallimard, "la Noire" collection)—Australian thriller
- 2007: I've Already Given (Le Dilettante), reissued by Actes Sud, "Babel noir" collection no. 22, 2008
- 2008: Gummed papers (Le Dilettante)
- 2009: Some [not too] calm ideas, Association Les Amis d'A.D.G., Paris, 48 pages.—Collects six columns written by A.D.G. from 1976 to 1978 in the magazine Item.
