= Prix Mystère de la critique =

French literary award

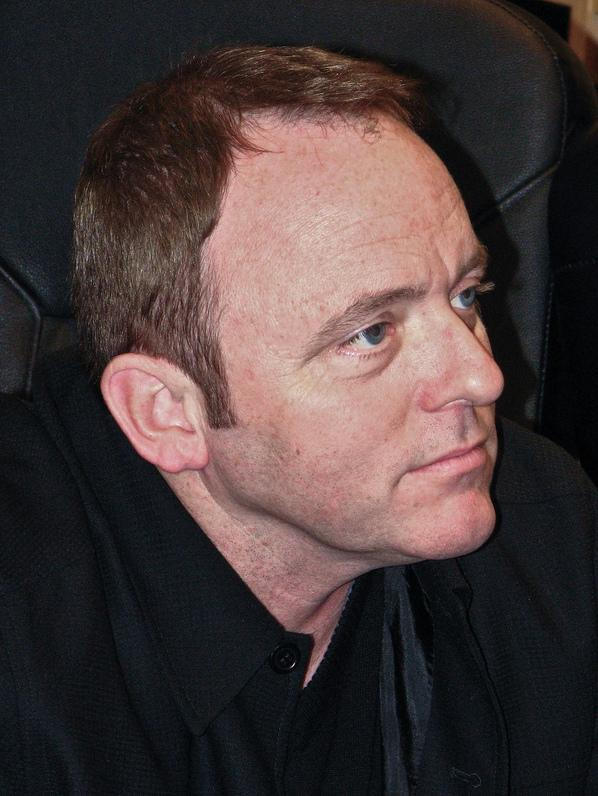
American Dennis Lehane, winner of the Prix Mystère de la critique in 2003

The Prix Mystère de la critique was established in 1972 by Mystère magazine, published by Éditions OPTA from 1948 to 1976, and is one of the oldest French awards for a detective novel. It continues to be awarded each year by its founder, Georges Rieben and his team, and has the characteristic of having survived the demise of the magazine.

Since 2011, the award's ceremony takes place at the Bibliothèque des littératures policières.

The prize is divided into two categories: French novel and foreign novel.

== Laureates of the best French novel ==
The prizewinners in the National category is reserved for the best French-language crime series published the previous year. The most successful in this category were the French Alain Demouzon (1979 and 2001), Pascal Dessaint (1997 and 2008), Thierry Jonquet (1994 and 1999), Dominique Manotti (2002 and 2007), Jean-Hugues Oppel (1995 and 2006), Fred Vargas (1996 and 2000) and Hervé Le Corre (2005 and 2010), who won the prize twice. Vargas was at the same time the first female criminal writer to be awarded the prize.

- 2018: Franz Bartelt : L'hôtel du grand cerf, Coll. Cadre Noir, Le Seuil, 2017
- 2017: Cloé Mehdi : Rien ne se perd, Jigal, 2017
- 2016: DOA : Pukhtu, Série Noire/Gallimard, 2015
- 2015: Nicolas Mathieu : Aux Animaux la Guerre, Actes Sud, Actes noirs
- 2014: Romain Slocombe : Première Station avant l'abattoir, Le Seuil (Seuil Policiers), 2013
- 2013: Olivier Truc : Le Dernier Lapon, Métailié (Noire), 2012
- 2012: Marcus Malte : Les Harmoniques, Éditions Gallimard (Série noire), 2011
- 2011: Marin Ledun : La Guerre des vanités, Gallimard (Série noire), 2010
- 2010: Hervé Le Corre : Les Cœurs déchiquetés, Rivages (Rivages/Thriller), 2009
- 2009: Caryl Férey : Zulu, Gallimard (Série noire), 2008
- 2008: Pascal Dessaint : Cruelles Natures, Rivages (Rivages/Thriller), 2007
- 2007: Dominique Manotti : Lorraine Connection, Rivages (Rivages/Thriller), 2006
- 2006: Jean-Hugues Oppel : French Tabloïds, Rivages (Rivages/Thriller), 2005
- 2005: Hervé Le Corre : L’Homme aux lèvres de saphir, Rivages (Rivages/Noir), 2004
- 2004: Michèle Rozenfarb : L'Homme encerclé, Gallimard (Série noire), 2003
- 2003: Claude Amoz : Bois-Brûlé, Rivages (Rivages/Noir), 2002
- 2002: Dominique Manotti : Nos fantastiques années fric, Rivages (Rivages/Thriller), 2001
- 2001: Alain Demouzon : La Promesse de Melchior, Calmann Levy (Melchior), 2000
- 2000: Fred Vargas : L’Homme à l’envers, Viviane Hamy (Chemins nocturnes), 1999
- 1999: Thierry Jonquet : Moloch, Gallimard (Série noire), 1998
- 1998: Hugues Pagan : Dernière station avant l'autoroute, Rivages (Rivages/Thriller), 1997
- 1997: Pascal Dessaint : Bouche d’ombre, Rivages (Rivages/Noir), 1996
- 1996: Fred Vargas : Debout les morts, Viviane Hamy (Chemins nocturnes), 1995
- 1995: Jean-Hugues Oppel : Brocéliande-sur-Marne, Rivages (Rivages/Noir), 1994
- 1994: Thierry Jonquet : Les Orpailleurs, Gallimard (Série noire), 1993
- 1993: Jean-Bernard Pouy : La Belle de Fontenay, Gallimard (Série noire), 1992
- 1992: Tonino Benacquista : La Commedia des ratés, Gallimard (Série noire), 1991
- 1991: Jacques Syreigeol : Une mort dans le Djebel, Gallimard (Série noire), 1990
- 1990: Joseph Bialot : Un violon pour Mozart, Gallimard (Série noire), 1989
- 1989: Patrick Raynal : Fenêtre sur femmes, Albin Michel, 1988
- 1988: Daniel Pennac : La Fée carabine, Gallimard (Série noire), 1987
- 1987: Didier Daeninckx : Play-Back, L’instant (L'Instant Noir), 1986
- 1986: Jean Amila : Au balcon d'Hiroshima, Gallimard (Série noire), 1985
- 1985: Pierre Magnan : La Maison assassinée, Denoël, 1984
- 1984: Tito Topin : 55 de fièvre, Gallimard (Série noire), 1983
- 1983: Albert Davidson : Élémentaire mon cher Holmes, Denoël (Sueurs froides), 1982
- 1982: Brice Pelman : Attention les fauves, Fleuve Noir (Spécial Police), 1981
- 1981: Jean-François Coatmeur : La Bavure, Denoël (Sueurs froides), 1980
- 1980: Jean Vautrin : Bloody Mary, Mazarine (Romans), 1979
- 1979: Alain Demouzon : Mes crimes imparfaits, Flammarion, 1978
- 1978: Michel Grisolia : L’Inspecteur de la mer, Jean-Claude Lattès
- 1977: Georges-Jean Arnaud : Enfantasme, Fleuve Noir (Spécial Police), 1976 et A. D. G. : L’Otage est sans pitié, Gallimard (Super noire), 1976 (ex æquo)
- 1976: Louis C. Thomas : La Place du mort, Denoël (Sueurs froides), 1975
- 1975: Raf Vallet : Adieu Poulet, Gallimard (Super noire), 1974
- 1974: Boileau-Narcejac : Le Secret d'Eunerville, Librairie des Champs-Elysées, 1973
- 1973: Fred Kassak : Nocturne pour un assassin, Presses de la Cité (Suspens), 1972
- 1972: Albert Simonin : Hotu soit qui mal y pense, Gallimard (Série noire), 1971

== Laureates of the best foreign novel ==
The prizewinners in the International category, is reserved for the best foreign crime scene published in the previous year in French translation. The most successful in this category were Donald E. Westlake (1972 and 2001), Robin Cook (1984 and 1995), William Bayer (1986 and 2005) and James Lee Burke (1992 and 2009), who could have won the award twice. Horst Bosetzky was the only German-speaking criminal writer, to succeed in the victory of a criminal writer. In 1988, he triumphed with his novel "Kein Reihenhaus" for Robin Hood, which had been published under the pseudonym -ky, under the title Robin des bois est mort, in the Bordeaux publishing house Le Mascaret the previous year.

=== 2010s ===
- 2018 — Killarney Blues by Colin O'Sullivan (Ireland, 2013)
- 2017 — Cartel by Don Winslow (USA, 2015)
- 2016 — Hell on Church Street by Jake Hinkson (USA, 2011)
- 2015 — Black Flies by Shannon Burke (USA, 2008)
- 2014 — The Singer's Gun by Emily St. John Mandel (Canada, 2010)
- 2013 — The Devil All the Time by Donald Ray Pollock (USA, 2011)
- 2012 — The Twelve by Stuart Neville (UK, 2009)
- 2011 — Twilight by William Gay (USA, 2007)
- 2010 — The Resurrectionist by Jack O’Connell (USA, 2008)

=== 2000s ===
- 2009 — Last Car to Elysian Fields by James Lee Burke (USA, 2003)
- 2008 — Winter's Bone by Daniel Woodrell (USA, 2006)
- 2007 — Cinco mujeres y media by Francisco González Ledesma (Spain, 2005)
- 2006 — Jar City (Mýrin) by Arnaldur Indriðason (Iceland, 2000)
- 2005 — The Dream of the Broken Horses by William Bayer (USA, 2002)
- 2004 — Dead at Daybreak (Orion) by Deon Meyer (South Africa, 2000)
- 2003 — Mystic River by Dennis Lehane (USA, 2001)
- 2002 — The Winter Queen (Азазель) by Boris Akunin : Azazel (Russia, 1998)
- 2001 — The Hook by Donald E. Westlake (USA, 2000)
- 2000 — Sidetracked (Villospår) by Henning Mankell (Sweden, 1995)

=== 1990s ===
- 1999 — The Shape of Water (La forma dell’acqua) by Andrea Camilleri (Italy, 1994)
- 1998 — The Poet by Michael Connelly (USA, 1996)
- 1997 — Enigma by Robert Harris (UK, 1995)
- 1996 — The Alienist by Caleb Carr (USA, 1994)
- 1995 — Not Till the Red Fog Rises by Robin Cook (UK, 1994)
- 1994 — March Violets by Philip Kerr (UK, 1989)
- 1993 — La Dama de Cachemira by Francisco González Ledesma (Spain, 1986)
- 1992 — Black Cherry Blues by James Lee Burke (USA, 1989)
- 1991 — The Silence of the Lambs by Thomas Harris (USA, 1988)
- 1990 — The Big Nowhere by James Ellroy (USA, 1988)

=== 1980s ===
- 1989 — The Wrong Case by James Crumley (USA, 1975)
- 1988 — Kein Reihenhaus für Robin Hood by Horst Bosetzky (Germany, 1979)
- 1987 — Coda by Tom Topor (USA, 1984)
- 1986 — Switch by William Bayer (USA, 1984)
- 1985 — Night of the Juggler by William P. McGivern (USA, 1975)
- 1984 — He Died With His Eyes Open by Robin Cook (UK, 1984)
- 1983 — Eddie Macon's Run by James McLendon (USA, 1980)
- 1982 — The Bourne Identity by Robert Ludlum (USA, 1980)
- 1981 — The Protector Malcolm Braly (USA, 1979)
- 1980 — Bad Ronald by Jack Vance (USA, 1973)

=== 1970s ===
- 1979 — Passage of Arms by Eric Ambler (UK, 1959)
- 1978 — No award
- 1977 — No award
- 1976 — The File on Lester by Andrew Garve (UK, 1974)
- 1975 — No award
- 1974 — No award
- 1973 — No award
- 1972 — The Hot Rock by Donald E. Westlake (USA, 1970)

== See also ==
- List of crime writers
