= Super noire =

Super noire is a collection of crime fiction, subsidiary of the Série noire, published by Éditions Gallimard from July 1974 to April 1979. Unlike books of the Série noire of the time, the covers of the Super noire are illustrated with a black and white photograph.

This series includes 134 volumes.

== List of titles ==
N°	Author	Title	Original title	Year of publication in the series
001	Vallet, Raf	Adieu Poulet !		1974
002	Bastid, Jean-Pierre	Méchoui-massacre		1974
003	Francis, Dick	La Casaque noire	Slayride	1974
004	Bastid, Jean-Pierre and Martens, Michel	Les Tours d'angoisse		1974
005	McShane, Mark	Mon mari est une sorcière	The Othello Complex	1974
006	McBain, Ed	Branle-bas au 87	Hail to the Chief	1974
007	Wilkins, Christopher	N'y mettez pas le doigt	Finger	1975
008	Blankenship, William Douglas	Les Irréguliers	The Leavenworth Irregulars	1975
009	McCarry, Charles	Opération Golgotha	The Miernik Dossier	1975
010	Bastid, Jean-Pierre and Martens, Michel	Derrick au poing		1975
011	Howard, Clark	Meurtres sous la loupe	The Killings	1975
012	Reese, John H.	On ne tue pas les lâches	They Don't Shoot Coward	1975
013	Clark, Evert and Horrock, Nicholas	L'Intouchable	Contrabandista	1975
014	McBain, Ed	Envoyez la fumée !	Where There's Smoke	1975
015	Collins, Max	La Vie en rouge	Bait Money	1975
016	Malstrom, Robert and Orceyre, Michel	Le Pot des anciens	Jud Night	1975
017	Rice, Jeff	Nuit de terreur	The Night Stalker	1975
018	Blazer, J.S.	J'suis pas dans le coup	Deal Me Out	1975
019	Kurz, Ron	Le Maton enragé	Lethal Gas	1975
020	Kenrick, Tony	Les Malheurs de Lily	Stealing Lillian	1975
021	Bosse, Malcolm	L'Homme qui aimait les zoos	The Man Who Loved Zoos	1975
022	Alverson, Charles	Y'a de l'abus !	Fighting Back	1975
023	Stark, Richard	Signé Parker	Butcher's Moon	1975
024	Gage, Nicholas	Du vent dans les toiles	Bones of Contention	1975
025	McBain, Ed	Flouze	Bread	1975
026	Collins, Max	La Course au sac	Blood Money	1975
027	Scott, Justin	L'Or à la pelle	Treasure for Treasure	1975
028	Collins, Michael	Hautes œuvres	The Silent Scream	1975
029	O'Donnell, Lillian	Viol à la une	Dial 577 R.A.P.E.	1975
030	Mann, Patrick	La Grande Pagaille	Dog Day Afternoon	1976
031	Bloch, Robert	Le Boucher de Chicago	American Gothic	1976
032	Swarthout, Glendon	Une gâchette	The Shootist	1976
033	Lyons, Arthur	Le Fouineur	The Dead Are Discreet	1976
034	Westlake, Donald Edwin	V'là aut' chose !	Jimmy the Kid	1976
035	Kenrick, Tony	Trois Petits Soldats	The Seven Days Soldiers	1976
036	Royce, Kenneth	Amenez les civières	The Woodcutter Operation	1976
037	Shagan, Steve	La Cité des dangers	City of Angels	1976
038	Francis, Dick	Gare aux tocards	High Stakes	1976
039	De Mille, Nelson	Haro sur les sorcières !	The Hammer of God	1976
040	McShane, Mark	Les Flocons de sang	The Headless Snowman	1976
041	Hirschfeld, Burt	Meurtres sur canapé	Secrets	1976
042	Vallet, Raf	Sa majesté le flic		1976
043	Miles, John and Morris, Tom	Les Pirates du crépuscule	Operation Nightfall	1976
044	Harris, Alfred	À la santé du trépassé	The Joseph File	1976
045	De Mille, Nelson	La Nuit du Phœnix	Night of Phoenix	1976
046	Arrighi, Mel	Le Couperet	The Hatchet Man	1976
047	McBain, Ed	Adieu cousine	Blood Relatives	1976
048	A.D.G.	L'Otage est sans pitié		1976
049	Jacks, Oliver	La Seconde de détente	Assassination Day	1976
050	Mitchell, James	La Java des truqueurs	Russian Roulette	1976
051	Manchette, Jean-Patrick	Que d'os !		1976
052	Burns, Rex	À la moulinette !	The Alvarez Journal	1976
053	Case, David	Le Filon fantôme	Plum Drillin	1976
054	Harris, Alfred	Suivez le veuf !	Baroni	1976
055	Leonard, Elmore	Plus gros que le ventre	Swag	1976
056	Reese, John H.	Un shérif pour tout le monde	A Sheriff for All the People	1976
057	Gores, Joe	Hammett	Hammett	1976
058	West, Elliot	Gare aux arêtes !	The Killing Kind	1977
059	Clapperton, Richard	Piège aux antipodes	The Sentimental Kill	1977
060	Bergman, Andrew	Le Pendu d'Hollywood	Hollywood and Levine	1977
061	Bleeck, Oliver	L'Entremetteur	No Questions Asked	1977
062	Riordan, William	La Main prenante	On the Take	1977
063	Irsfeld, John H.	Cavale au Texas	Little Kingdoms	1977
064	Furst, Alan	Jamais le jeudi	Your Day in Barrel	1977
065	Knickmeyer, Steve	Les tueurs sont tristes	Straight	1977
066	Thomas, Ross	Du sang dans les urnes	Yellow-Dog Contract	1977
067	Bastid, Jean-Pierre and Martens, Michel	Adieu la vie...		1977
068	Garlington, Philip	Le Tandem des méchants	Ace and Eights	1977
069	Francis, Dick	Et voilà le tableau !	In the Frame	1977
070	De Mille, Nelson	Les harengs font la malle	The Smack Man	1977
071	Dennis, Ralph	On bricole	Murder's Not and Odd Job	1977
072	Charyn, Jerome	Marilyn la Dingue	Marilyn The Wild	1977
073	MacKenzie, Donald	Le Chasseur de rats	Raven and the Ratcatcher	1977
074	McCarthy, Gary	Le Colt et le Stylo	The Derby Man	1977
075	Judson, William	Les Saigneurs du village	Kilman's Landing	1977
076	Ryck, Francis	Les Fils des alligators		1977
077	Charyn, Jerome	Zyeux-Bleux	Blue Eyes	1977
078	Dwyer, K.R.	L'Opération Libellule	Dragon Fly	1977
079	Dennis, Ralph	Les Flambeurs d'Atlanta	Down Among the Jocks	1977
080	McBain, Ed	L'Énervé de la gâchette	Guns	1977
081	Charyn, Jerome	Kermesse à Manhattan	The Education of Patrick Silver	1977
082	Downing, Warwick	D'amour et de sang frais	The Gambler, the Minstrel and the Dance Hall Queen	1977
083	Lake, Peter	Les Inguérissables	Leffert's Disease	1977
084	Imbar, Jean-Gérard	Les Lignards		1977
085	Dennis, Ralph	Premier couteau	The Charleston Knife's Back in Town	1978
086	Leonard, Elmore	Homme inconnu N° 89	Unknown Man N° 89	1978
087	Ryck, Francis	Nos intentions sont pacifiques		1978
088	Wiles, Domini	La mort a des ailes	Death Flight	1978
089	Upton, Robert	Pourquoi tuer ce vieux Georges ?	Who'd Want To Kill Old George ?	1978
090	Barrett, Bob	L'Ingénu chez les cowboys	Delay At Parson's Flat	1978
091	Destanque, Robert	Le Serpent à lunette		1978
092	Kenyon, Michael	Viol à l'irlandaise	The Rapist	1978
093	Lyons, Arthur	La Ravissante à l'abattoir	The Killing Floor	1978
094	Wilcox, Collin	Un carton sur les flics	Doctor Lawyer	1978
095	Marshall, William	Hong-Kong blues	The Hatchet Man	1978
096	Blankenship, William Douglas	De sang, de glace et d'or	Yukon Gold	1978
097	Brett, Michael	La Croqueuse de carats	Diamond Kill	1978
098	Arrighi, Mel	La Neige d'Istanbul	Turkish White	1978
099	Murray, William	Kidnapping à la romaine	The Mouth of the Wolf	1978
100	Alexander, Patrick	{Mort d'une bête à la peau fragile	Death of a Thin Skinned Animal	1978
101	Westlake, Donald Edwin	N'exagérons rien !	A Travest	1978
102	Ryck, Francis	Prière de se pencher au-dehors		1978
103	Russell, A.-J.	Y en a là-dedans !	The Devalino Caper	1978
104	Fauque, Jean-Charles	Sidi Ben Barbès		1978
105	Leonard, Elmore	Le Don Quichotte du Sinaï	The Hunted	1978
106	Waller, Leslie	La Légion des donneurs	Hide in Plain Sight	1978
107	Steelman, Robert James	La Belle Dame chez les Sioux	Portrait of a Sioux	1978
108	Jackson, Jon A.	Tu t'entêtes ?	The Diehard	1978
109	Block, Lawrence	Le Tueur du dessus	Burglar can't Be Choosers	1978
110	Bialot, Joseph	Le Salon du prêt-à-saigner		1978
111	Cunningham, E.V.	Les morts s'affranchissent	The Case of the One Penny Orange	1978
112	McBain, Ed	Ça fait une paye !	Long Time No See	1978
113	Teresa, Vincent	L'Ombrageux	Wiseguys	1978
114	Westlake, Donald Edwin	La Joyeuse Magouille	Nobody's Perfect	1978
115	Kaminsky, Stuart	Ne tirez pas sur Errol Flynn !	Bullet for a Star	1978
116	Crisp, Norman James	Retroussons nos manches	The Odd Job Man	1978
117	LaFountaine, George	Le Pétard récalcitrant	Flashpoint	1978
118	Currington, Owen Josiah	Et sombre la galère	Break-Out	1978
119	Barrett, Bob	Prends garde aux cactus !	Pembrook vs. The West	1979
120	Greenhall, Ken	Des tueurs pas comme les autres	Hell Hound	1979
121	Kaminsky, Stuart	Judy et ses nabots	Murder On the Yellow Brick Road	1979
122	Cunningham, E.V.	Le Noyé de Beverly Hills	The Case of the Russian Diplomat	1979
123	Leonard, Elmore	La Joyeuse Kidnappée	The Switch	1979
124	Parrish, Frank	Des oiseaux et des flammes	Fire in the Barkley	1979
125	Francis, Dick	{Risqué !	Risk	1979
126	Silver, Alfred	Pas de quoi pleurer	Good Time Charlie's Back in Town Again	1979
127	Royce, Kenneth	La Méthode à Satan	The Satan Touch	1979
128	Quinn, Derry	Les Petites Têtes piégées	The Fear of God	1979
129	McBain, Ed	J'ai tout gâché	Goldilocks	1979
130	Block, Lawrence	Le monte-en-l'air est dans le placard	The Burglar in the Closet	1979
131	Rutherford, Douglas	Gagne ou crève	Collision Course	1979
132	Leonard, Elmore	Valdez est arrivé !	Valdez Is Coming	1979
133	Crisp, Norman James	Très peu pour moi !	The London Deal	1979
134	Parrish, Frank	Sur un p'tit cheval	Stings of the Honeybee	1979

== Bibliography ==
- Claude Mesplède. Les Années Série Noire vol.4 (1972-1982) Encrage “ Travaux ” No. 25, 1995.
