= The Secret Lovers (novel) =

- First edition
- Author: Charles McCarry
- Language: English
- Series: Paul Christopher
- Genre: Spy novel
- Published: 1977
- Publisher: E.P. Dutton (US); Hutchinson & Co (UK)
- Publication place: United States
- Preceded by: The Tears of Autumn
- Followed by: The Last Supper (Novel)

The Secret Lovers, published by E.P. Dutton in 1977, was the third of seven novels by the American novelist Charles McCarry to feature an American intelligence agent named Paul Christopher. It takes place in 1960 and '61, a year after the events in the first Christopher novel, The Miernik Dossier, published in 1973, and three years before the beginning of The Tears of Autumn, published in 1974, which was actually the second book McCarry wrote about Christopher. Later books by McCarry, ten in all as of 2013, expanded from focusing solely on Christopher into what might be considered a chronicle of the Christopher universe: two novels feature his cousins, the Hubbards, and in many of the Christopher novels his father, mother, one-time wife, and daughter play important and recurring roles. Also in this universe is a 1988 historical novel, The Bride of the Wilderness, about Christopher's ancestors in 17th-century England, France, and Massachusetts. McCarry had been an undercover operative for the Central Intelligence Agency for nine years before turning to writing, and his books were hailed for their apparent authenticity and realistic depiction of tradecraft. The Miernik Dossier received excellent reviews, and instantly established McCarry's reputation as one of the foremost American novelists of espionage. Like all of McCarry's books, this one displays "an almost Jamesian awareness of [its] European locale, the special authenticity of a loving expatriate writing of an adopted foreign land."

== "Secret" in the title ==
The word secret in the title is first understood by the reader to be a noun rather than an adjective—at one point the cool, distant Christopher tries to explain his remoteness and emotional detachment to his beautiful young wife, "I love secrets, we all do. That's why we do the work.... I put my emotions aside.... I couldn't do the job if I let myself go free." As the book progresses, however, in a subplot nearly as important as the primary one involving espionage, his wife creates her own secret world of lovers to try to break Christopher out of his detachment from her.

== Paul Christopher ==
Although the entire narrative of the book basically follows the actions and thoughts of Paul Christopher, we learn little more about him than we did in The Miernik Dossier, where he was not always on stage. Even though he is now married to a beautiful, young, passionate girl apparently from his own general background—"their mothers had been in the same class at Bryn Mawr; their fathers used the same law firm in New York"—and with whom he is apparently deeply in love, he is still the same mostly faceless agent as before. We are told again that he had served in the Army in World War II and that he attended Harvard. And we are told that he previously wrote poetry but no longer does—his wife begs him to begin again but he refuses. His reputation within the shadowy agency for which he works, obviously the CIA but never actually called that, is high: his colleagues and superiors consider him to be intelligent, imaginative, coldblooded, and implacable. He is, at all times, a thorough-going professional, always conscious of his shadowy status. His cover is said to be that of a well-known journalist or free-lance writer for prominent magazines, but this is never directly shown. He lives in Rome, and only there does he permit himself to be known in restaurants by his own name. Elsewhere, "as a matter of professional caution, he booked table reservations in a false name, and made certain that he did not eat at the same restaurant, or drink at the same bar, more than two or three times a year."

But even before he became a spy, Christopher had disliked being recognized by headwaiters and bartenders. As a youth he had never exchanged a word with the New York Irishmen who tended bar at P.J. Clarke's or the Frenchmen behind the zinc bar at the Dôme, though others seemed to attach importance to being known by name to these contemptuous men.

== Recurring characters ==
In most of McCarry's novels, both those about Christopher and those about his cousins the Hubbards, there are characters who turn up in more than one of the books. In The Secret Lovers we have Paul Christopher, who had been in two earlier books, and the first appearance of his wife, Cathy, as well as David Patchen, a Harvard roommate, fellow soldier in World War II, and colleague in their intelligence agency. Both of them will figure prominently in later books. Barney Wolkowicz, who will have important roles in Christopher's future, is chief of the Berlin station here. Otto Rothschild, a major character in this book, is mentioned briefly in The Last Supper, written six years later. His wife, Maria, also important in The Secret Lovers, reappears in Second Sight, published in 1991, as does Otto. Horst Bülow, the hapless German agent whose murder in the first pages of this book sets the plot in motion, also makes more than one brief appearance in The Last Supper.

== Discrepancies in the Christopher saga ==
McCarry apparently wrote The Miernik Dossier with no idea that Christopher would go on to become the hero of future novels. As the Christopher saga expanded and background details were fleshed in, discrepancies arose between the newer books and what the reader had been told about Christopher in earlier ones.

The Last Supper, published in 1983, begins with a long section about Christopher's parents and his birth and upbringing in post-World War I Weimar Germany; it is clear from that book that Christopher was an only child, contrary to what had been said in the first three books, and that his mother was a German baroness who, contrary to The Secret Lovers, never attended the American college Bryn Mawr.

On the other hand, since Christopher is a professional agent used to dissembling, he does not have to tell the truth when talking about his past life.

== Sources ==
The Secret Lovers, Signet, 1977
