= Johann Gottfried Schweighäuser =

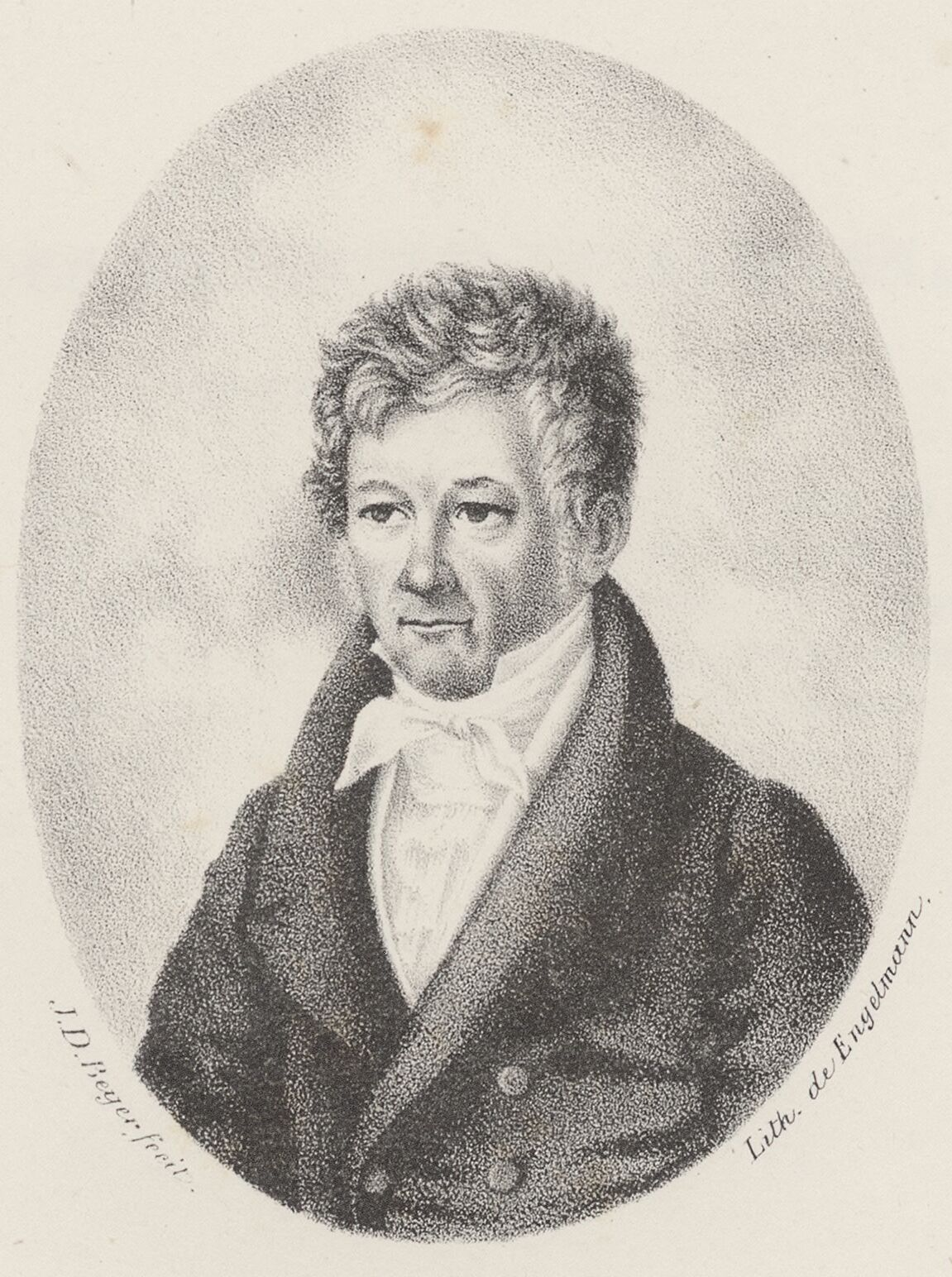
Jean Geoffroy Schweighaeuser

Johann Gottfried Schweighäuser (French: Jean Geoffroy Schweighaeuser) (2 January 1776, Strasbourg –14 March 1844) was a French philologist and archaeologist. He was the son of classicist Johann Schweighäuser.

At the age of 13 he began his studies of philosophy at the University of Strasbourg. In 1792 he volunteered with the French armed forces, subsequently being involved in a number of war-related events in the Palatinate. After his discharge from military service, he relocated to Paris, where in 1799, he was for a short period of time, a tutor in the home of Wilhelm von Humboldt. According to Paul Louis Courier, his father sent him to England to collate a manuscript for his edition of Athenaeus.

In 1812 he became a professor at the Protestant seminary in Strasbourg, and three years later succeeded his father as librarian at the munincipal and seminary libraries. In 1824 he took over his father's chair at the University of Strasbourg.

In 1822 he became a correspondent member of the Académie des Inscriptions et Belles-Lettres.

== Published works ==
He was joint-author with Philippe de Golbéry of Antiquités de l'Alsace (1828). Other noted works by Schweighäuser include:

- Notice sur la vie et les travaux littéraires de M. Brunck, 1803 – On the life and literary work of Richard François Philippe Brunck.
- Les monumens antiques du Musée Napoléon (with Tommaso Piroli, Louis-Charles François Petit-Radel) 1804 – Ancient monuments at the Musée Napoléon.
- Notice sur un passage de Simplicius découvert par le citoyen Schweighaeuser – On a passage of Simplicius discovered by Schweighaeuser.
- Stances pour une fête religieuse de la paix, suivies de récitations religieuses et patriotiques et d'un hymne au dieu de la lumière, Paris : Maugeret, 1814.
- Discours sur les services que les Grecs ont rendus à la civilisation, 1821.
- Mémoire sur les antiquités romaines de la ville de Strasbourg, 1822 – On Roman antiquities in the city of Strasbourg.
- Notice sur les anciens châteaux et autres monumens remarquables de la partie méridionale du département du Bas-Rhin, Strasbourg : impr. de F.G. Levrault, 1824.
- Histoire de l'invention de l'imprimerie, pour servir de défense à la ville de Strasbourg contre les prétentions de Harlem (with Jean Frédéric Lichtenberger), 1825.
- Antiquités de Rheinzabern, 1832 – Antiquities of Rheinzabern.
- Notice sur les antiquités gallo-romaines de Rheinzabern, 1843 – On Greco-Roman antiquities of Rheinzabern.
- Caractères de La Bruyère: Suivis des Caractères de Théophraste, 1844 – The Caractères of Jean de La Bruyère, followed by the "Characters" of Theophrastus.
