= The Tears of Autumn =

1974 novel by Charles McCarry

- First edition
- Author: Charles McCarry
- Language: English
- Series: Paul Christopher
- Genre: Spy novel
- Published: 1974
- Publisher: Saturday Review Press
- Publication place: United States
- Preceded by: The Miernik Dossier
- Followed by: The Secret Lovers (Novel)

The Tears of Autumn (1974) is American author Charles McCarry's second novel, and the second novel in the Paul Christopher series.

== Plot ==
In November 1963, American intelligence case officer and former Marine Paul Christopher investigates the assassination of US President John F Kennedy. Believing that the Kennedy White House was behind the assassination of Vietnamese President Ngo Dinh Diem, Christopher deduces that Vietnamese leaders had Kennedy assassinated as revenge. When one of Kennedy's former advisers threatens Christopher not to discuss the matter with anyone else, Christopher quits the Agency and heads to Vietnam to find the truth.
