= The Last Supper (novel) =

Novel by Charles McCarry

- The Last Supper Arrow edition, 1984
- Author: Charles McCarry
- Language: English
- Series: Paul Christopher
- Genre: Spy novel
- Published: 1983
- Publication place: United States
- Preceded by: The Secret Lovers (Novel)
- Followed by: Second Sight (Novel)

The Last Supper (1983) is the fourth book in the Paul Christopher series by American espionage novelist Charles McCarry.

== Plot ==
The Last Supper relates, in episodic fashion, the multi-generational saga of Paul Christopher's family. The opening chapters tell of the courtship and marriage of his father and mother: blue-blooded American writer Hubbard Christopher and the Baronesse Hannelore von Beucheler, a daughter of Prussian aristocracy.

Christopher's childhood is spent on the island of Rügen in the Baltic as Weimar Germany gives way to the rise of the Third Reich, and the boy is sent to a Francophone school in Switzerland for his own good.

Ultimately, after a series of inconclusive but icy encounters with the Gestapo, the Christophers in the summer of 1939 determine to quietly flee to Paris, but are intercepted; father and son, as U.S. citizens, are beaten and expelled from the country, but Lori (as she is known) is forced to remain behind as a subject of the Reich. As war erupts, Hannelore Christopher vanishes without a trace. Her disappearance will haunt both her husband and the adult Paul Christopher throughout the coming decades.

== Critical reception ==
Comparing the author favorably to British espionage novelist John le Carré, reviewer Jacob Heilbrunn writes in The New York Times that McCarry, "a former American intelligence officer who did tours of duty in Europe, Africa, and Asia [has mined] his experiences in The Last Supper… Written in spare, biting prose, [the novel] traverses much of the past century, from Weimar Germany to Burma during World War II, from Vietnam in the '50s and '60s to Mao Zedong's China… McCarry is the genuine article. This is a blazingly good read that is almost impossible to put down."

In a wide-ranging review of McCarry's fiction, Pulitzer Prize-winning book critic Michael Dirda of The Washington Post observes that the character of Barnabas (Barney) Wolkowicz, Paul Christopher's dogged mentor in espionage work, "steals the show in The Last Supper. In an intelligence community dominated by blond Ivy League graduates, and in particular by the ultra WASPy Hubbard-Christopher clan, Barney is an outsider, the son of a steelworker from Youngstown, a graduate of Kent State, unkempt, overweight, almost buffoonish. He is also, according to an implacable enemy, the most brilliant spy of his generation."
