= Tito Topin =

French journalist, writer and illustrator (1932–2025)

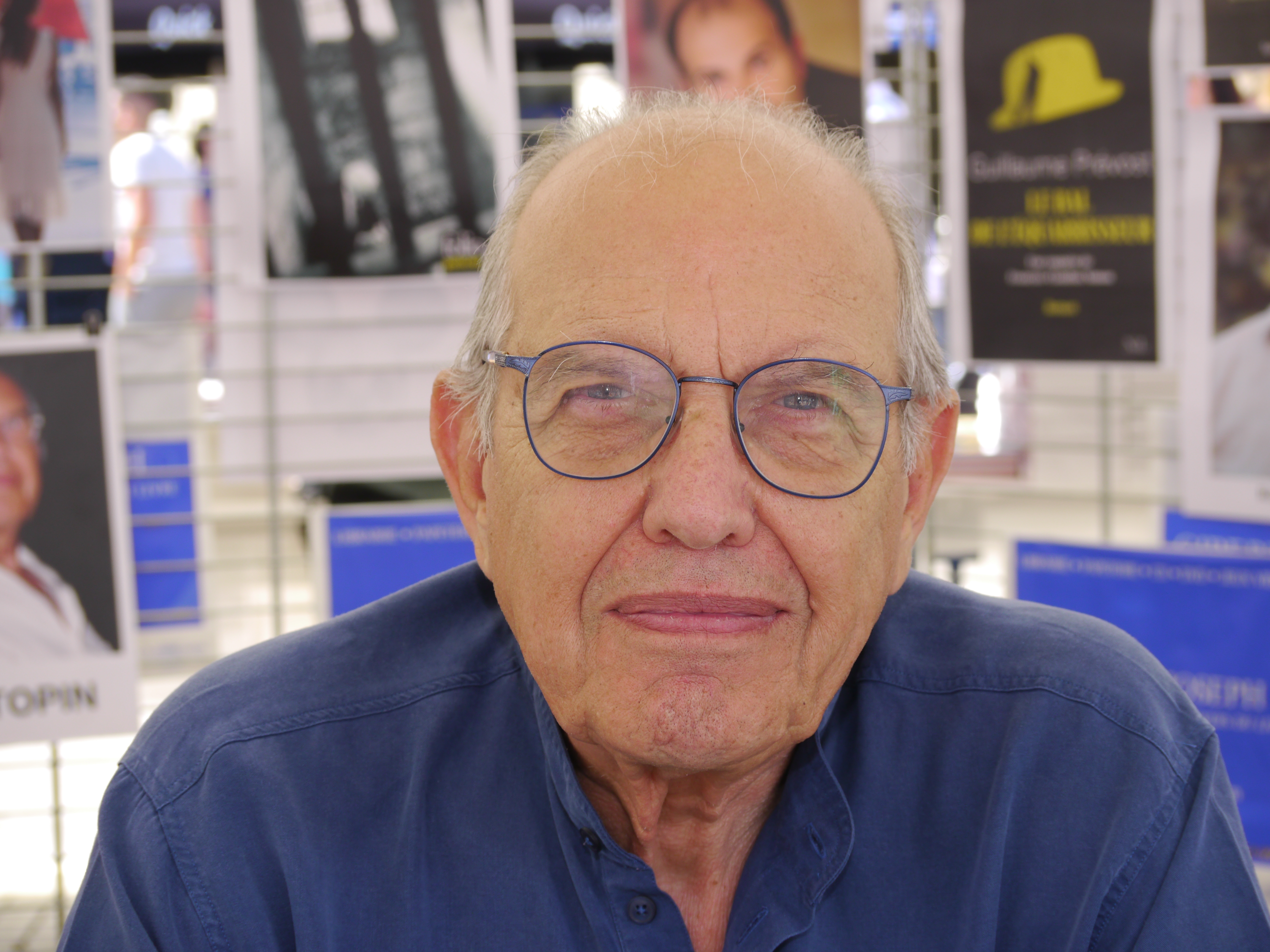
- Topin in 2011
- Born: 23 February 1932; Casablanca, French protectorate in Morocco
- Died: 6 December 2025 (aged 93); Avignon, France
- Occupations: Journalist, writer, illustrator

Tito Topin (23 February 1932 – 6 December 2025) was a French journalist, writer and illustrator.

== Life and career ==
Born in Casablanca on 23 February 1932, Topin's father was a police detective in Oran. He moved first to Brazil before settling in Paris in 1966, illustrating a comic strip titled La langouste ne passera pas. He then began to write screenplays and crime novels, which oftentimes took place in North Africa. His novel 55 de fièvre received the Prix Mystère de la critique in 1984. In 2008, he married fellow novelist Chantal Pelletier.

Topin died in Avignon on 6 December 2025, at the age of 93.

== Works ==
=== Novels ===
==== Émile Gonzales series ====
- Graffiti Rock (1982)
- 55 de fièvre (1983)
- 14e Nocturne (1983)
- Piano Barjo (1983)
- Honey Money (1984)
- Tchatcha Nouga (1984)

==== Other novels ====
- Brelan de Nippons (1982)
- Shanghaï Skipper (1985)
- Le Cœur et le Chien (1985)
- Pension Pullman (1986)
- Un gros besoin d'amour (1988)
- Le Transsaharien (1994)
- La Belle Vie (1997)
- Le Système Navarro (2005)
- Bentch et Cie (2006)
- Une femme d'une étourdissante beauté (2006)
- Sur un air de Navarro (2007)
- Bentch Blues (2007)
- Cool Bentch ! (2008)
- Photo-finish (2008)
- Parfois je me sens comme un enfant sans mère (2009)
- Des rats et des hommes (2011)
- Les Enfants perdus de Casablanca (2011)
- Tout le monde il est beau, tout le monde il est Jean Yanne (2012)
- Libyan Exodus (2012)
- Métamorphose des cendres (2014)
- De Gaulle n'est pas un auteur de polar (2016)
- L'exil des mécréants (2017)

=== Essays ===
- Casablanca. L'aventure du film (2021)

=== Stories ===
- Le Jinome de Casablanca (1990)
- La Fille du sultan (1999)
- Un été 22 (2012)
- Bloody Paris (2015)

=== Children's works ===
- Le Naufrage de Tito Pirate (1977)
- Tito Pirate et le Dauphin (1977)
- La Fiancée de Tito Pirate (1977)
- Une araignée (1978)
- La Légende de Pigott (1978)

=== Comics ===
- Les Dossiers du B.I.D.E. La langouste ne passera pas (1969)
- Les Dossiers du B.I.D.E. Voyage au centre de la c...ulture (1969)
- À tes souhaits (1985)
- V comme ...engeance (1988)

== Distinctions ==
- Prix Mystère de la critique for 55 de fièvre (1984)
- Grand Prix de Littérature Policière for Un gros besoin d'amour (1989)
- Grand prix national de la création audiovisuelle (1996)
- Grand Prix Polar de Cognac for Bentch et Cie (2006)
- Plume de Cristal of the Festival international du film policier de Liège for Des rats et des hommes (2012)
- Knight of the Ordre des Arts et des Lettres
