= Michel de Roy =

French writer (1948–2021)

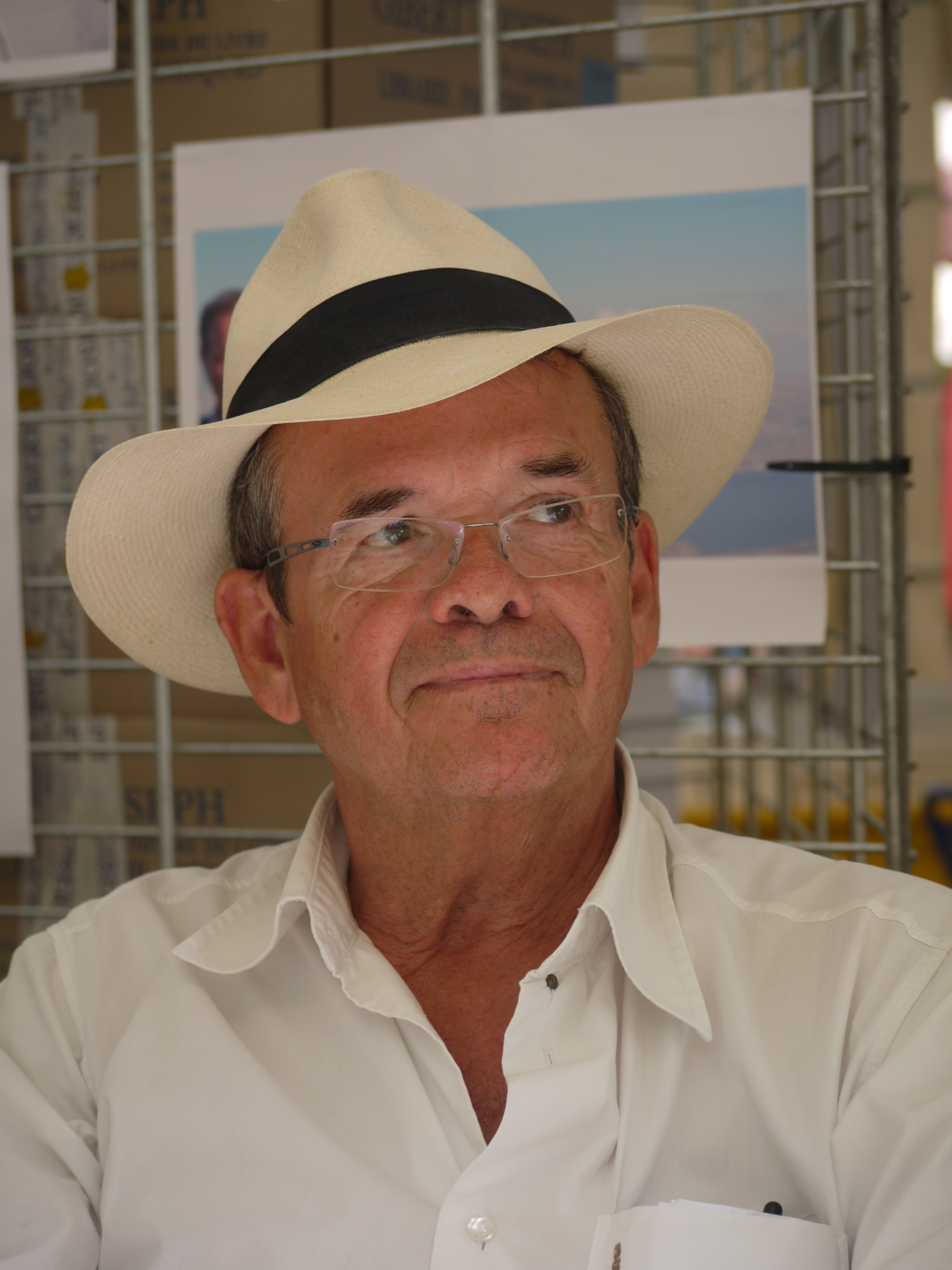
- de Roy in 2010
- Born: 13 December 1948; Orange, France
- Died: 15 October 2021 (aged 72); La Grande-Motte, France
- Occupation: Writer

Michel de Roy (13 December 1948 – 15 October 2021) was a French writer.

== Biography ==
After working as a bartender and shopkeeper, de Roy became a police officer and private detective. In 1985, he published his first novel, titled Sûreté urbaine. In 1986, he received the Prix du Quai des Orfèvres. He then continued a career as a writer and published over forty novels, as well as tales and short stories.

Michel de Roy died in La Grande-Motte on 15 October 2021 at the age of 72.

== Works ==
=== Novels ===
==== Rémy de Choli series ====
- Crime assuré (2003)
- Meurtre en sous-traitance (2004)
- 64, boulevard Gambetta (2005)
- Écarts de conduite (2006)
- Y'a pas de raison (2009)
- Séquestration (2011)
- Au troisième coup de maillet (2014)
- Sévices compris (2018)

=== Other novels ===
- Sûreté urbaine (1985)
- Dernier Casse (1988)
- eBanditisme sans frontières (1989)
- Contes du Midi (1990)
- Un tueur peut en cacher un autre (1991)
- Fric, drogue, sexe, crime, racket, haute sécurité ? (1994)
- Écarts de conduite (2006)
- Un petit dernier pour la route (2006)
- De sac et de corde (2007)
- Sans issue (2009)
- Y a pas de raison (2010)
- Séquestration (2011)
- Pour solde de tout compte (2012)
- Voyage en première classe (2012)
- Au troisième coup de maillet (2014)
- La Rue en trompe-l’œil (2015)
- Sévices compris (2016)
- Le Cadavre est dans l'ascenseur (2018)
- Vol programmé (2020)

=== Other works ===
- Vous écrivez ? Alors, attention : guide pratique à l'usage des écrivains débutants ou confirmés (2017)
