= Prix du Quai des Orfèvres =

French literary award

The Prix du Quai des Orfèvres is an annual French literature award created in 1946 by Jacques Catineau. It goes to an unpublished manuscript written by an anonymous author for a French-language police novel. The selected novel is then published by a major French publishing house, since 1965 Fayard. The jury is led by the chief of the Prefecture of Police of Paris. The name of the award refers to the headquarters of the Paris police, located at 36, quai des Orfèvres.

== Description ==
Every year, a jury of 22 members read 15 shortlisted unpublished manuscripts. Each shortlisted story must display an accurate knowledge of the law. The winning author gets a 50,000-copy publishing deal with Fayard, and 777 euros. Considered a prestigious award in the genre in France, it is also dubbed the "Goncourt des Polars".

== Laureates ==
The following writers have received the award:

Year	Laureate	Work
1946	Jacques Levert	Le Singe rouge
1947	Jean Le Hallier	Un certain monsieur...
1948	Yves Fougères	Nuit et brouillard
1949	Francis Didelot	L'Assassin au clair de lune
1951	Maurice Debroka	Opération Magali
1952	Saint Gilles	Ne tirez pas sur l'inspecteur
1953	Cécil Saint-Laurent	Sophie et le crime
1954	Alain Serdac & Jean Maurinay	Sans effusion de sang
1956	Noël Calef	Échec au porteur
1957	Louis C. Thomas	Poison d'Avril
1958	André Gillois	125, rue Montmartre
1959	Jean Marcillac	On ne tue pas pour s'amuser
1960	Rémy	Le Monocle noir
1961	Robert Thomas	Huit femmes
1962	Micheline Sandrel	Dix millions de témoins
1963	Roland Pidoux	On y va, patron?
1964	Jean-François Vignat	Vertige en eau profonde
1965	Paul Drieux	Archives interdites
1966	Julien Clay	Du sang sur le grand livre
1967	H.L. Dugall	La Porte d'or
1968	Bernard-Paul Lallier	Le Saut de l'ange
1969	Christian Charrière	Dites-le avec des fleurs
1970	Henry Chardot	Le Crime du vendredi saint
1971	André Friederich	Un mur de 500 briques
1972	Pierre-Martin Perreaut	Trop, c'est trop!
1974	Michèle Ressi	La Mort du bois de Saint-Ixe
1975	Bernard Matignon	Une mort qui fait du bruit
1976	Serge Montigny	Une fleur pour mourir
1977	Jacquemard-Sénécal	Le Crime de la maison Grün
1978	Pierre Magnan	Le Sang des Atrides
1979	Julien Vartet	Le Déjeuner interrompu
1980	Denis Lacombe	Dans le creux de la main
1981	Michel Dansel	De la part de Barbara
1982	Hélène Pasquier	Coup double
1983	Maurice Périsset	Périls en la demeure
1984	Jean Lamborelle	On écrase bien les vipères
1985	Roger Labrusse	Les Crimes du Bon Dieu
1986	Michel de Roy	Sûreté urbaine
1987	Nicole Buffetaut	Le Mystère des petits lavoirs
1988	Yves Fougères	Un agent très secret
1989	Godefroy Hofer	Plongée de nuit
1990	Suzanne Le Viguelloux	La Mort au noir
1991	Frédéric Hoë	Crimes en trompe-l'œil
1992	Louis-Marie Brézac	Razzia sur l'antique
1993	Gérard Delteil	Pièces détachées
1994	Jean-Louis Viot	Une belle garce
1995	Michel Gastine	Quai de la Rapée
1996	Gilbert Schlogel	Rage de flic
1997	Roger Le Taillanter	Heures d'angoisse
1998	Michel Sibra	La Danse du soleil
1999	André Delabarre	Du sang sur les roses
2000	André Arnaud	Pierres de sang
2001	Guy Langlois	Le Fond de l'âme effraie
2002	André Klopmann	Crève l'écran
2003	Jérôme Jarrige	Le Bandit n'était pas manchot
2004	Sylvie M. Jema	Les Sarments d'Hippocrate
2005	Jules Grasset	Les Violons du diable
2006	Christelle Maurin	L'Ombre du soleil
2007	Frédérique Molay	La 7e femme
2008	P.J. Lambert	Le Vengeur des catacombes
2009	Christophe Guillaumot	Chasses à l'homme
2010	Gilbert Gallerne	Au pays des ombres
2011	Claude Ragon	Du bois pour les cercueils
2012	Pierre Borromée	L'hermine était pourpre
2013	Danielle Thiéry	Des clous dans le cœur
2014	Hervé Jourdain	Le Sang de la trahison
2015	Maryse Rivière	Tromper la mort
2016	Lionel Olivier	Le crime était signé
2017	Pierre Pouchairet	Mortels Trafics
2018	Sylvain Forge	Tension extrême
2019	Paul Merault	Le Cercle des impunis
2020	Alexandre Galien	Les Cicatrices de la nuit
2021	Christophe Gavat	Cap Canaille
2023	Martial Caroff	Ne me remerciez pas
