= Wrong Is Right =

1982 film by Richard Brooks

- Original film poster
- Directed by: Richard Brooks
- Written by: Richard Brooks
- Based on: The Better Angels by Charles McCarry
- Produced by: Richard Brooks; Andrew Fogelson; George Grenville
- Starring: Sean Connery; Robert Conrad; George Grizzard; Hardy Krüger; Ron Moody; Leslie Nielsen; Katharine Ross; John Saxon; Henry Silva; G. D. Spradlin; Robert Webber; Rosalind Cash
- Cinematography: Fred J. Koenekamp
- Edited by: George Grenville
- Music by: Artie Kane
- Production company: Rastar
- Distributed by: Columbia Pictures
- Release date: April 16, 1982
- Running time: 117 minutes
- Country: United States
- Language: English
- Budget: $10 million
- Box office: $3.5 million

Wrong Is Right, released in the UK as The Man with the Deadly Lens, is a 1982 American political satire comedy thriller film directed, written, and co-produced by Richard Brooks and starring Sean Connery as TV news reporter Patrick Hale. The film, based on Charles McCarry's novel The Better Angels (1979), is about the theft of two suitcase nukes.

== Plot ==
In the near future, violence has become something of a national sport and television news has fallen to tabloid depths. Patrick Hale, a globe-trotting reporter with access to a staggering array of world leaders, has ventured to the Arab country of Hegreb to interview his old acquaintance, King Ibn Awad.

Awad has learned that the President of the United States may have issued orders for his removal; as a result, Awad is apparently making arrangements to deliver two suitcase nukes to a terrorist, with the intention of detonating them in Israel and the United States, unless the President resigns.

In the intricate plot that unfolds, nothing is quite the way it seems, and Hale finds himself caught between political leaders, revolutionaries, CIA agents and other figures, trying to get to the bottom of it all.

In the final twist, the government, with Hale in tow, locates two atomic bombs supposedly planted by terrorist Rafeeq atop the World Trade Center. The US uses this as pretext for invading the Middle East and taking possession of oilfields. Hale correctly intuits that the government had planted the bombs in order to rally US support for the invasion, but gladly covers the story the way the government wants in exchange for front-line access to film the action.

== Cast ==
- Sean Connery as Patrick Hale
- Robert Conrad as General Wombat
- George Grizzard as President Bedford Forrest "Frosty" Lockwood
- Katharine Ross as Sally Blake
- G. D. Spradlin as Jack Philindros
- John Saxon as Homer Hubbard
- Henry Silva as Rafeeq
- Leslie Nielsen as Franklin Mallory
- Hardy Krüger as Helmut Unger
- Robert Webber as Harvey
- Ron Moody as King Awad
- Rosalind Cash as Mrs. Ford
- Dean Stockwell as Hacker
- Cherie Michan as Erika
- Jennifer Jason Leigh as Young Girl
- Mickey Jones as Gunman
- Angelo Bertolini as Cardinal

== Production ==
Filming locations include El Paso, New York, Washington, D.C., Texas, New Mexico, France, Italy, the Alamo in San Antonio, White Sands National Park, Alamogordo and Albuquerque, and others.

Richard Brooks made a product placement deal with the Sony, which allowed use of Sony television monitors and news equipment.

== Critical reception ==
The film received negative reviews from critics who cited its "unfocused script" that tries "to satirize so many targets", as well as its confusing visuals.

Vincent Canby of The New York Times said the screenplay was scattershot and Sean Connery's performance is "the first uncertain [one] of his otherwise exemplary career".

Based on 11 reviews on review aggregate website Rotten Tomatoes, Wrong Is Right has an approval score of 27%. On Metacritic, the film has a weighted average score of 50 out of 100, based on 7 critics, indicating "mixed or average reviews".

Stanley Kauffmann of The New Republic wrote, "Wrong Is Right is possibly the noisiest film ever made, and the most incessantly whirling one. Its only distinction is that, besides being basically rotten, it is also rotten on the surface."

Donald Guarisco of AllMovie said, "If viewed through a cult-movie mindset, it's easy to see why Wrong Is Right is appealing to that group of viewers. The script has a scathing, darkly funny take on international politics that one wouldn't expect from a well-funded Hollywood project of the early 1980's and also mixes up offbeat humor and message-oriented drama in a way that keeps the film from affecting a comfortable Hollywood style."

== Awards and nominations ==
Rosalind Cash was nominated for an NAACP Image Award Best Performance by an Actress in a Motion Picture.
