= The Better Angels =

- First edition (publ. E.P. Dutton h/b)
- Author: Charles McCarry
- Language: English
- Publisher: E.P. Dutton
- Publication date: 1979
- ISBN: 0-525-06631-4 (first edition)
- Dewey Decimal: 813.54
- LC Class: PZ4.M12265 Be

The Better Angels is a 1979 thriller novel by Charles McCarry. It was poorly received at the time of its release; its premise of terrorists using passenger planes as instruments of destruction was considered too implausible to suspend one's disbelief. It was the basis of the comedic 1982 Richard Brooks film Wrong Is Right starring Sean Connery, which was similarly poorly received. In 2008, the book, along with other McCarry thrillers, was released by Overlook Duckworth, labeled "the prophetic thriller." It is now believed to have predicted the attacks of September 11, 2001, and their aftermath. The title is a reference to Abraham Lincoln's first inaugural address, a quote from which is the novel's epigraph, and the term is said to refer to Patrick Graham's conception of President Lockwood and Julian Hubbard.

== Structure ==
The novel is set in 2000, during an election campaign between former president Franklin Mallory and current president Bedford Forrest "Frosty" Lockwood. It opens and closes with the Midsummer and Midwinter parties held by Patrick Graham, a news anchor famous for his progressive politics, and his wife, Charlotte, and in between those isolated chapters, it is divided into four parts. Franklin Mallory wants to be the first president since Grover Cleveland to serve two non-consecutive terms. During his first term, he had attempted a hostile takeover of Canada, incarcerated people for having criminal tendencies on psychological tests, and hired hundreds of thousands of out of work college graduates to work on the spaceship, Humanity, which sent a crew to Ganymede. All of these programs were undone by Lockwood.

The novel is predominantly focused on the Graham family and the Hubbard family. (The Hubbards are closely related to the Christophers, protagonists of most of McCarry's novels.) The Hubbards are deeply entrenched in the Foreign Intelligence Service, a successor to the CIA after the latter was shut down for corruption. Horace, son of Elliott Hubbard, had a hand in raising and educating Talil, the son of emir Ibn Awad of Hagreb, a tiny Arab nation and recent oil state. Talil was decapitated for allegedly murdering Awad at the signed request of his father. Horace's brother Julian Hubbard, also with FIS, is President Lockwood's closest adviser. He is married to his second wife, Emily (which is also the name of his deceased mother), and has two children, Elliott, and Jenny, by his first wife, Caroline, who was once raped by Patrick Graham, both friend and rival to Julian. Emily longs to become pregnant with a child, and Julian wants to name the child Horace. The three names are prominent in his family, but its men never name sons for themselves.

== Plot ==
The novel's inciting incident is when one-legged Clive Wilmot, an Englishman (England is out of money, and Eton-educated British often work as servants to wealthy Americans) arrives uninvited at the Grahams' Midsummer Party, telling Patrick that President Lockwood, who is supposedly liberal and a champion of the people, had Ibn Awad executed.

Patrick Graham goes to visit Horace Hubbard at his home in Beirut, and learns that Ibn Awad had dysgraphia from a lesion in his brain that rendered him unable to write, and presumed uneducatable and illiterate. Patrick later learns that he is slightly behind in this information. Awad's Muslim followers admire his illiteracy, and he is well known to have scribes to take dictation for him. Eventually, though, Patrick obtains an audiocassette from a government official named Jack Philindros, in which President Lockwood orders Horace to arrange for the murder of Awad, believing that Awad has nuclear bombs that he plans to use on Jerusalem and New York City. He is believed to have connections with a terrorist group called the Eye of Gaza that has been using suicide bombers in airplanes over Jerusalem and Tel Aviv.

Patrick is unable to resist a good story, though he is devoted to President Lockwood in spite of Lockwood's own failings. Large cities are dark at night to conserve electricity, and garbage pickup has stopped, causing urban areas to become squalid and filthy. Based on what he learns, when he finally broadcasts the story, he claims that Lockwood saved Jerusalem and New York by his action, although the nuclear bombs were never found. Until Mallory starts pressing the issue, the announcement that Lockwood had Awad killed makes little impact on the polls. Opinion of Patrick Graham goes up when Emily Hubbard does a magazine story on him. Emily, however, becomes convinced that her first child with Julian died in the womb as a direct result of learning of his and Horace's involvement in the murder of Awad. Only Julian and Emily treat it as an actual death, having seen the fetus, about the size of a finger, in the toilet.

At the novel's climax, Clive Wilmot is identified as the source of the nuclear bombs, although the fact that he is willing to sit on their cases indicates an unlikelihood that they ever existed in the first place. He is given a fortune in Swiss bank notes, which he leaves in a cave in Hagreb. He is met by an American calling himself "Hugo" who gives him a Mercedes and disappears into the crowd. While Wilmot is urinating, Hamad, leader of the Eye of Gaza, gets out of the trunk and strangles him. Rose MacKenzie, lover of Horace Hubbard and a mathematician in charge of FIS computer systems, reveals that she is able to steal the election. With the passcodes "a sunlit upland" in a speech made by Lockwood on the abandoned Washington Mall after terrorist attacks at speeches in landmark locations, and "pastrami, hold the mayonnaise," Rose gets a certain number of votes in places where computerized voting is set up (only in California, New York, and Michigan) for Mallory and gives them to Lockwood, causing him to win the election by a very close margin. Mallory refuses to give a concession speech.

== Film version ==
In 1982, Richard Brooks, using his own screenplay, adapted the novel into the film, Wrong Is Right, more satirical and certainly more broadly comic than the novel. Patrick Graham was renamed Patrick Hale (Sean Connery), and the only other names retained from the novel were Lockwood (George Grizzard), Ibn Awad (Ron Moody), Mallory (Leslie Nielsen), Philindros (G. D. Spradlin), and Hagreb. The Hubbards, largely the focus of the novel, were virtually omitted, although John Saxon portrays a "Homer Hubbard." The film was as poorly received as the novel was at the time.

== Revival ==
Attempts to revive the novel and film as "prophetic" in 2008 were largely unsuccessful commercially, in spite of strong critical response. The novel was riddled with typographical errors and quickly remaindered, as was the DVD issue of the film version.

== Sources ==
Charles McCarry. The Better Angels. (1979). New York: Overlook Duckworth Press, 2008.
