= Loup Durand =

French writer (1933–1995)

Loup Durand (1933–1995) was a French crime writer. He was born in Flassans-sur-Issole and studied in Marseille, Aix-en-Provence, London and New York. He worked in a variety of professions such as barman, docker, flight attendant, interpreter, and journalist.

He began his career as a professional writer at the age of forty-three. He wrote numerous thrillers, some under pseudonyms such as "H. L. Dugall" and "Michaël Borgia", the latter used with Pierre Rey.

He won several prizes for his work:

- 1967 Prix du Quai des Orfèvres for La Porte d'or (written under the pen name HL Dugall)
- 1976 Prix du roman d'aventures for Un amour d'araignée
- 1987 Prix Maison de la Presse for Daddy

Daddy was translated into English by J. Maxwell Brownjohn. It was made into a bande dessinee illustrated by Rene Follet, and a movie in 2003, featuring Klaus Maria Brandauer.

Durand also wrote scripts, e.g. for the Alain Delon thriller Dancing Machine and for the 1982 TV series The Tiger Brigades.
