= Bad Ronald =

1974 television film directed by Buzz Kulik

- Home video cover
- Genre: Drama; Horror; Thriller
- Based on: Bad Ronald by Jack Vance
- Written by: Andrew Peter Marin
- Directed by: Buzz Kulik
- Starring: Scott Jacoby; Pippa Scott; John Larch; Dabney Coleman; Kim Hunter
- Country of origin: United States
- Original language: English

Production
- Executive producer: Lee Rich
- Producer: Philip Capice
- Running time: 74 minutes
- Production company: Lorimar Productions

Original release
- Network: ABC
- Release: October 23, 1974

Bad Ronald is a 1974 American made-for-television horror thriller film directed by Buzz Kulik and starring Scott Jacoby, Pippa Scott, John Larch, Dabney Coleman and Kim Hunter. The screenplay was written by Andrew Peter Marin, based on the novel of the same title by Jack Vance. The film was ABC's Wednesday Movie of the Week on October 23, 1974.

== Plot ==
Ronald Wilby is a socially inept, awkward high school youth with budding artistic talent and a predilection for fantasy, who is often ridiculed for his behavior and mannerisms. His overprotective mother, Elaine, needs surgery and plans for Ronald to become a doctor and cure her illness. Ronald's father has not been heard from in years, having divorced his mother and agreeing to terminate his parental rights in exchange for not having to pay child support.

One afternoon, while asking out Laurie Matthews at her backyard pool, Ronald is rejected and then ridiculed by her friends. As he returns home, he accidentally runs into and knocks over her younger sister Carol. Carol, like Laurie, taunts Ronald. He pushes her over, inadvertently killing her. Panicking, he buries the body and confesses to his mother. Fearing the police will not believe that it was accidental, Ronald and his mother install a wallboard to the entrance to a small back room and wallpaper the door frame to the downstairs bathroom, converting the closed-off space to a living quarters for Ronald, with a concealed trapdoor in the pantry through which Ronald can escape in an emergency. The plan is for him to hide in the room until the incident blows over. Mrs. Wilby tells Ronald to compose a note for the police to find, stating that he has run away.

Ronald's mother pays attention to what neighbors, particularly the nosy Mrs. Schumacher, and others are saying about the discovery of the girl's body and tells Ronald that when it's safe, he can return to a normal life. One afternoon, his mother is taken into a hospital for gallbladder surgery, from which she unexpectedly dies. In the meantime, Ronald has created a fantasy world in his head consisting of a prince and a princess that live happily until an evil duke appears and a struggle begins.

Shortly after Mrs. Wilby's death, the house is sold to the Wood family, consisting of a mother and father with three teenage daughters: Babs, Althea, and Ellen. As Ronald needs food and begins to crave human interaction, disappearances of food and odd noises are experienced by the new family.

Babs, the youngest of the Wood daughters, becomes identified with Ronald's princess and he identifies himself as the prince. Duane Matthews, oldest daughter Ellen's boyfriend and brother of the Matthews girls, becomes identified with the evil duke that threatens their happiness. Ronald's goal is to "regain" his princess and remove anything and anyone that interferes with his dream. During this time, neighbor Mrs. Schumacher sees Ronald and dies of a heart attack from the shock; fearing the police will blame him, Ronald buries her too.

Mr. and Mrs. Wood make plans to go out of town for a couple of days, leaving the girls on their own. Ronald confronts Babs when she is alone in the house and tells her she is his princess. She flees to Mrs. Schumacher's house next door (unaware of her demise), but Ronald locks her in the basement and forges a note for her sisters to find, claiming she has run away. Both Ellen and Althea are skeptical of the note, but the police refuse to do anything. Ronald later attacks Duane when he is alone in the house. He knocks him out, binds and gags him, and hides him in his hidden living space. The police now suspect something is wrong and advise Ellen and Althea to check into a hotel; they refuse.

Shortly after the police leave, the girls hear noises downstairs as Duane tries to free himself and fights with Ronald. Althea notices one of the many peepholes Ronald has drilled. When she approaches it, she sees Ronald's eye staring back at her and screams in terror as Ronald breaks through the wall. The police, who have been watching the house, hear the screams and rush back. Ronald is captured as he tries to flee, crying out for his mother. Babs is found after escaping from Mrs. Schumacher's basement, and Duane is found in the living space, both shaken but not seriously harmed.

== Cast ==
- Scott Jacoby as Ronald Wilby
- Kim Hunter as Elaine Wilby
- Pippa Scott as Mrs. Wood
- John Larch as Sgt. Lynch
- Ted Eccles as Duane Matthews
- Dabney Coleman as Mr. Wood
- Cindy Fisher as Babs Wood
- Cindy Eilbacher as Althea Wood
- Lisa Eilbacher as Ellen Wood

== Reception ==
In his book What Were They Thinking? The 100 Dumbest Events in Television History, author David Hofstede ranked the movie at #90 on the list.

== Home media ==
The film was released on VHS in the 1980s and reissued on DVD in August 2009, as part of the manufacture-on-demand Warner Archive Collection. It was later released on Blu-ray on October 9, 2018.

== See also ==
- List of American films of 1974
- List of horror films of 1974
- The Boy, also featuring a troubled boy who murders a young girl and is then hidden by parents in the walls of his house.
- Daniel LaPlante
