= Bad Ronald (novel) =

1973 novel

- First edition
- Author: Jack Vance
- Cover artist: Mort Engel
- Language: English
- Genre: horror
- Publisher: Ballantine
- Publication date: September 1973
- Publication place: United States
- Media type: Print (paperback)
- Pages: 219 pp
- ISBN: 0-345-23477-4
- OCLC: 755714

Bad Ronald is a 1973 horror novel by Jack Vance first published by Ballantine Books. It was adapted into a made-for-television thriller, also called Bad Ronald, in 1974, as well as a French production, Méchant garçon, in 1992.

Bad Ronald received a Prix Mystère de la critique in 1980 for best foreign novel. Upon author Jack Vance's death in 2013, after rights revisions, Bad Ronald (which by the 2000s had long-since fallen out of print and was considered rare to collectors and readers) was republished as an eBook and a print on demand paperback by publisher Spatterlight Press. This publication was connected with the official website of Jack Vance where his work is managed posthumously.

== Plot summary ==
Ronald Wilby, a 17-year-old boy with divorced parents, lives with his mother. Living with his first sexual urges, he tries to rape a girl. He kills the girl and buries her. Having forgotten his jacket at the scene of the crime, he confesses to his mother, who decides to hide Ronald in their house. She tells the police that her son has disappeared. Ronald lives in his hidden room, only going out into the rest of the house at night. When his mother dies, a couple and their three daughters move into the house, none-the-wiser that Ronald is living in the walls. Over time, he becomes infatuated with the daughters, and signs of his presence begin to surface in the household, concerning the new residents.

The book differs somewhat from the 1974 movie adaptation. The book was considerably more graphic, featuring scenes of rape, paedophilia and sexual perversion. The movie toned these elements down; rather than trying to rape the young girl, in the movie Ronald accidentally kills her in a blind rage after she mocks him and his mother for being "weird".
