= Pierre Magnan =

French crime fiction writer

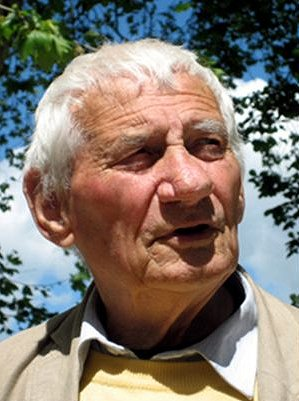
- Born: 19 September 1922; Manosque, France
- Died: 28 April 2012 (aged 89)
- Occupation: Crime fiction writer
- Awards: Prix du Quai des Orfèvres (1978); Martin Beck Award (1983); Prix Mystère de la critique (1985)

Pierre Magnan (19 September 1922 – 28 April 2012) was a French crime fiction writer.

His Commissaire Laviolette novels were adapted into a television series starring Victor Lanoux.

== Early life ==
Pierre Magnan was born on 19 September 1922 in Manosque. At the age of 13 he started working as a typographer and two years later started to write. His style was influenced by Jean Giono to whom he will dedicate a book later called To Greet Giono. During World War II he became acquainted with a novelist Thyde Monnier, who by 1946 published his work for the Éditions Julliard.

== Awards ==
His awards include Prix du Quai des Orfèvres from 1978, for Le Sang des Atrides, the Martin Beck Award in 1983, for Le Commissaire dans la truffière, for best crime fiction translated into Swedish language, and Prix Mystère de la critique in 1985, for La Maison assassinée.
