= Sébastien Lapaque =

French writer

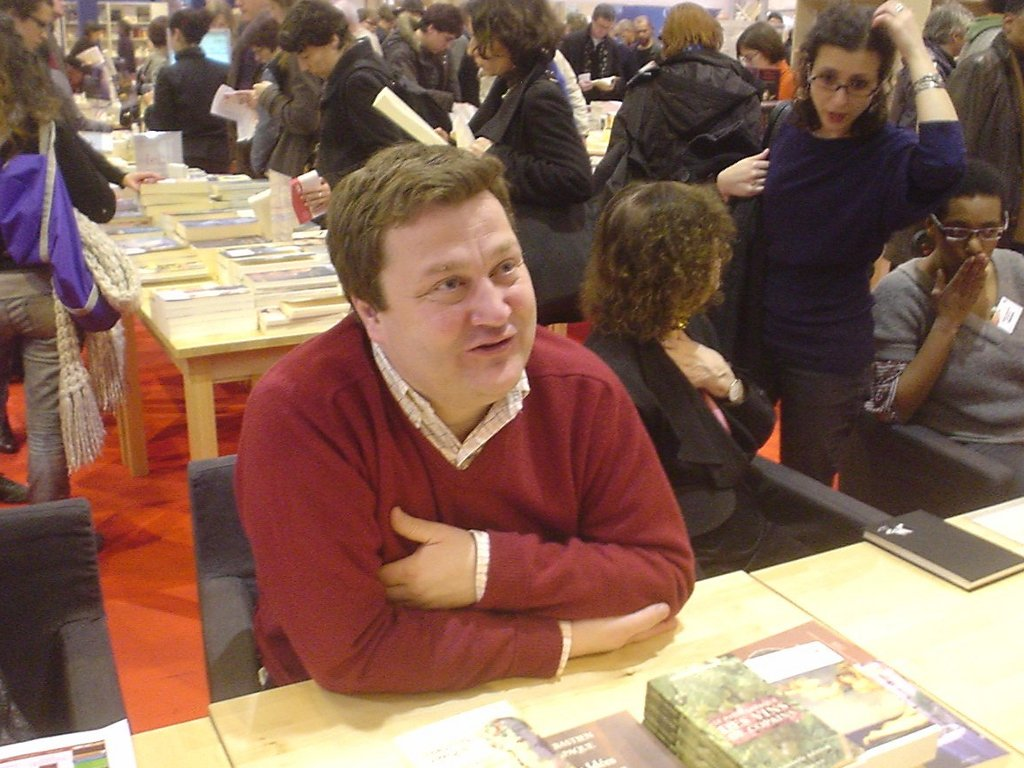
Sébastien Lapaque at Paris Salon du Livre 2010

Sébastien Lapaque is a French writer.

== Awards ==
- 2000 : Prix François Mauriac de l'Académie française
- 2002 : Prix Goncourt de la Nouvelle, Mythologie Française
- 2004 : Prix James-Hennessy

== Works ==
=== Novels ===
- Les Barricades mystérieuses (with a préface de Frédéric H. Fajardie), co-édition : éditions Actes Sud, coll. « Babel noir » no 319, Arles, 1998, et éditions Leméac, Montréal, 1998, 268 p., (ISBN 2-7427-1679-3) (Actes Sud) ou (ISBN 2-7609-1893-9) (Leméac), (Notice BNF no FRBNF36703273w)
- Les Idées heureuses, éditions Actes Sud, coll. « Domaine français », Arles, 1999, 163 p., (ISBN 2-7427-2369-2), (Notice BNF no FRBNF37053414w)
- Les Identités remarquables, éditions Actes Sud, coll. « Domaine français », Arles, 2009, 174 p., (ISBN 978-2-7427-8536-0), (Notice BNF no FRBNF420258388)

=== Essays and pamphlets ===
- Georges Bernanos encore une fois:
  - première édition – Co-édition : éditions L'Âge d'Homme, Lausanne, et éditions Les Provinciales, Lyon, 1998, 126 p., (ISBN 2-912833-01-9), (Notice BNF no FRBNF361984217)
  - réédition – Éditions Actes Sud, coll. « Babel » no 534, Arles, 2002, 167 p., (ISBN 2-7427-3734-0), (Notice BNF no FRBNF38823047n)
- Sous le soleil de l’exil, Georges Bernanos au Brésil, 1938–1945, éditions Bernard Grasset, Paris, 2002, 226 p., (ISBN 2-246-63821-6), (Notice BNF no FRBNF389499266)
- Il faut qu'il parte, éditions Stock, Paris, 2008, 134 p., (ISBN 978-2-234-06161-3), (Notice BNF no FRBNF41271136x)
- Sermon de saint François d'Assise aux oiseaux et aux fusées, éditions Stock, Paris, 2008, 90 p., (ISBN 978-2-234-06199-6), (Notice BNF no FRBNF413726101)

=== Short stories ===
- 2001 : Le spleen de Ben Hur in Lectures pour tous, contre le prêt payant en bibliothèque publique, Cétacé, collection dirigée par Didier Daeninckx et Valère Staraselski, Éditions Bérénice.
- 2002 : Mythologie française, Actes Sud.
- 2004 : Le Mot de la fin in Le Dernier Homme, nouvelles présentées et rassemblées par Jérôme Leroy, Le Belles Lettres
- 2010 : Le Dernier roi de Belomanie, la Nouvelle Revue Française n°595, Gallimard.

=== Anthologies ===
- 1999 : Triomphe de Dionysos, avec Jérôme Leroy, Actes Sud.
- 2002 : J’ai vu passer dans mon rêve, anthologie de la poésie française, Librio
- 2004 : Le goût de Rio de Janeiro, Mercure de France
- 2004 : Le goût d'Athènes, Mercure de France
- 2009 : Les 7 péchés capitaux, Librio
