= Paul Louis Courier =

French Hellenist and political writer (1773-1825)

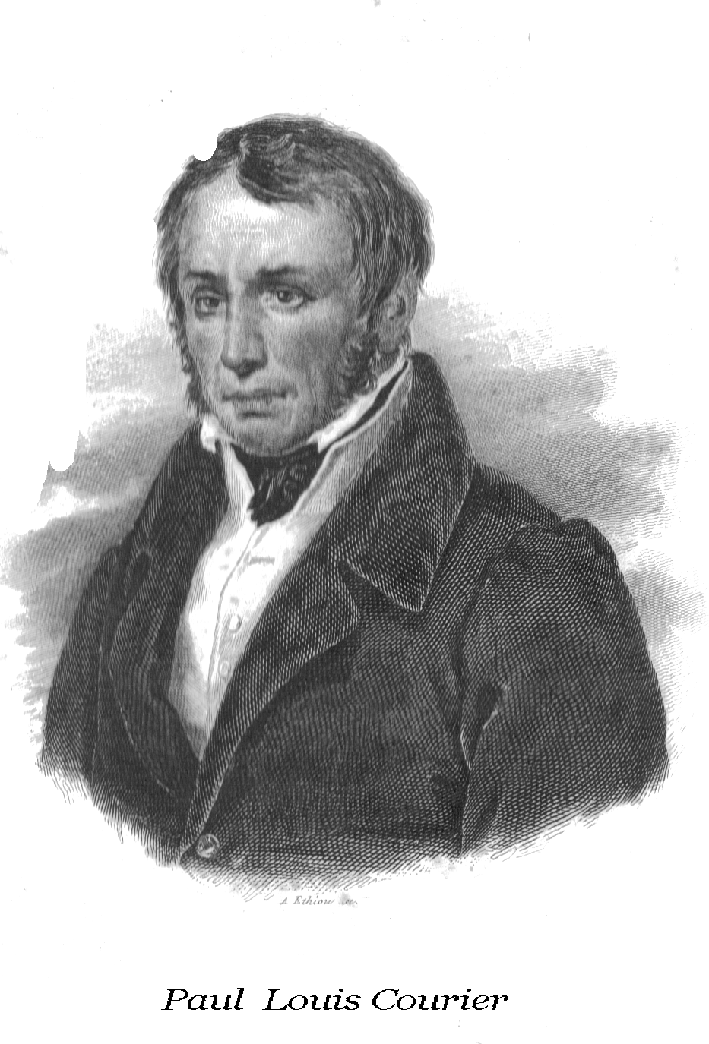
Paul-Louis Courier, exact date unknown

Paul Louis Courier (French: [kuʁje]; 4 January 1772 – 10 April 1825, Paris, France) was a French Hellenist and political writer.

== Life ==
Brought up on his father's estate of Méré in Touraine, he conceived a bitter aversion for the nobility, which seemed to strengthen with time. He would never take the name "de Méré", to which he was entitled, lest he should be thought a nobleman. At the age of fifteen, he was sent to Paris to complete his education; his father's teaching had already inspired him with a passionate devotion to Greek literature, and although he showed considerable mathematical ability, he continued to devote all his leisure to the classics. He entered the school of artillery at Châlons, however, and immediately on receiving his appointment as sub-lieutenant in September 1793 he joined the army of the Rhine. He served in various campaigns of the Revolutionary wars, especially in those of Italy in 1798-99 and 1806-7, and in the German campaign of 1809. He became chef d'escadron in 1803.

He made his first appearance as an author in 1802, when he contributed to the Magasin encyclopédique a critique on Johann Schweighäuser's edition of Athenaeus. In the following year appeared his Eloge d'Hélène, a free imitation rather than a translation from Isocrates, which he had sketched in 1798. Courier had given up his commission in the autumn of 1808, but the general enthusiasm in Paris over the preparations for the new campaign affected him, and he attached himself to the staff of a general of artillery. But he was horror-struck by the carnage at Wagram (1809), refusing from that time to believe that there was any art in war.

He hastily quit Vienna, escaping the formal charge of desertion because his new appointment had not been confirmed. The savage independence of his nature rendered subordination intolerable to him; he had been three times disgraced for absenting himself without leave, and his superiors resented his satirical humour. After leaving the army he went to Florence, and was fortunate enough to discover in the Laurentian Library a complete manuscript of Longus's Daphnis and Chloe, an edition of which he published in 1810. As a consequence of a misadventure—blotting the manuscript—he was involved in a quarrel with the librarian and was compelled by the government to leave Tuscany. He retired to his estate at Véretz (Indre-et-Loire), but frequently visited Paris, and divided his attention between literature and his farm.

After the second restoration of the Bourbons the career of Courier as political pamphleteer began. He had before this time waged war against local wrongs in his own district and had been the adviser and helpful friend of his neighbours. He now made himself by his letters and pamphlets one of the most dreaded opponents of the government of the Restoration. The first of these was his Petition aux deux chambres (1816), exposing the sufferings of the peasantry under the royalist reaction. In 1817 he was a candidate for a vacant seat in the Institute; and failing, he took his revenge by publishing a bitter Lettre à Messieurs de l'Academie des Inscriptions et Belles-Lettres (1819). This was followed (1819–1820) by a series of political letters of extraordinary power published in Le Censeur Européen. He advocated a liberal monarchy, at the head of which he doubtless wished to see Louis Philippe.

The proposal, in 1821, to purchase the estate of Chambord for the duke of Bordeaux called forth from Courier the Simple Discours de Paul Louis, vigneron de la Chavonnière, one of his best pieces. For this he was tried and condemned to suffer a short imprisonment and to pay a fine. Before he went to prison he published a compte rendu of his trial, which had a still larger circulation than the Discours itself. In 1823 appeared the Livret de Paul Louis, the Gazette de village, followed in 1824 by his famous Pamphlet des pamphlets, called by his biographer, Armand Carrel, his swan-song.

Courier published in 1807 his translation from Xenophon, Du commandement de la cavalerie et de l'equitation, and had a share in editing the Collections des romans grecs. He also projected a translation of Herodotus, and published a specimen, in which he attempted to imitate archaic French; but he did not live to carry out this plan. On April 10, 1825, on a Sunday afternoon, Courier was found shot in a wood near his house. The murderers, who were servants of his own, remained undiscovered for five years. There were many stories in the village of Veretz that they had been fired for their sexual liaisons with his wife, who left him for Paris shortly afterwards. He is buried in Veretz cemetery, close to his son and the grave of the later poet Eugène Bizeau. The anarchist poet's grandmother was mentioned in Courier's own work. There were, however, rumours of a political murder by the authorities which remained current for many years.

The writings of Courier, dealing with the facts and events of his own time, are valuable sources of information as to the condition of France before, during, and after the Revolution. Sainte-Beuve finds in Courier's own words, "peu de matière et beaucoup d'art", the secret and device of his talent, which gives his writings a value independent of the somewhat ephemeral subject-matter.

A Collection complète des pamphlets politiques et opuscules litteraires de P. L. Courier appeared in 1826. See editions of his Œuvres (1848), with an admirable biography by Armand Carrel, which is reproduced in a later edition, with a supplementary criticism by Francisque Sarcey (1876–1877); also three notices by Sainte-Beuve in the Causeries du lundi and the Nouveaux Lundis.

In the centre of Veretz there is a stele, raised in honour of Courier 50 years after his murder, and the opening was observed by many eminent writers of the time.
