= Charles McCarry =

American writer (1930–2019)

- Born: June 14, 1930; Pittsfield, Massachusetts, U.S.
- Died: February 26, 2019 (aged 88); Fairfax County, Virginia, U.S.
- Occupation: Author
- Writing career
- Period: 1961–2019
- Genre: Spy fiction

Charles McCarry (June 14, 1930 – February 26, 2019) was an American writer, primarily of spy fiction, and a former undercover operative for the Central Intelligence Agency.

== Biography ==
McCarry's family came from The Berkshires area of western Massachusetts. He was born in Pittsfield, and lived in Virginia. He graduated from Dalton High School.

McCarry began his writing career in the United States Army as a correspondent for Stars and Stripes. He served from 1948 to 1951 and achieved the rank of sergeant. He received initial training at Fort Benning, Georgia, and was stationed in Germany for almost two years and at Camp Pickett, Virginia for about a year.

After his army service, he was a speechwriter in the early Administration of President Dwight D. Eisenhower. In 1958, at the invitation of Cord Meyer, he accepted a post with the CIA, for whom he traveled the globe as a deep cover operative. He took a leave of absence to work for the 1960 Nixon campaign, writing for vice-presidential candidate Henry Cabot Lodge. He left the CIA for the last time in 1967, becoming a writer of spy novels.

McCarry was also an editor-at-large for National Geographic and contributed pieces to The New York Times, The Wall Street Journal, The Washington Post, the Saturday Evening Post, and other national publications.

== Approach to writing ==
McCarry believed that "the best novels are about ordinary things: love, betrayal, death, trust, loneliness, marriage, fatherhood." In 1988 McCarry described the themes of his novels to date as "ordinary things – love, death, betrayal and the American dream."

McCarry wrote that: "After I resigned [from the CIA], intending to spend the rest of my life writing fiction and knowing what tricks the mind can play when the gates are thrown wide open, as they are by the act of writing, between the imagination and that part of the brain in which information is stored, I took the precaution of writing a closely remembered narrative of my clandestine experiences. After correcting the manuscript, I burned it. What I kept for my own use was the atmosphere of secret life: How it worked on the five senses and what it did to the heart and mind. All the rest went up in flames, setting me free henceforth to make it all up. In all important matters, such as the creation of characters and the invention of plots, with rare and minor exceptions, that is what I have done. And, as might be expected, when I have been weak enough to use something that really happened as an episode in a novel, it is that piece of scrap, buried in a landfill of the imaginary, readers invariably refuse to believe."

McCarry was an admirer of the work of Eric Ambler and W. Somerset Maugham, especially the latter's Ashenden stories. He was also an admirer of Richard Condon, author of The Manchurian Candidate (1959).

== Paul Christopher series ==
Ten of McCarry's novels involve the life story of a fictional character named Paul Christopher, who grew up in pre-Nazi Germany, and later served in the Marines and became an operative for a U.S. government entity known as "the Outfit", meant to represent the Central Intelligence Agency.

These books are, in order of publication:

1. The Miernik Dossier (1973): Christopher investigates a possible Soviet spy in Geneva
2. The Tears of Autumn (1974): Christopher investigates the Kennedy Assassination
3. The Secret Lovers (1977): Christopher discovers a secret plot within the CIA
4. The Better Angels (1979): Christopher's cousins steal a Presidential election
5. The Last Supper (1983): introduction to Christopher's parents in pre-World War II Germany; Christopher is imprisoned in China
6. The Bride of the Wilderness (1988): historical novel concerning 17th-century Christopher ancestors
7. Second Sight (1991): released from a Chinese prison, Christopher meets a daughter he did not know he had
8. Shelley's Heart (1995): a sequel to The Better Angels in which Christopher's cousins cause a presidential impeachment
9. Old Boys (2004): Christopher's old associates discover a plot involving terrorists and the fate of Christopher's mother
10. Christopher's Ghosts (2007): the story of Christopher's first love in pre-World War II Germany

Alternately, in chronological order of events depicted:

1. Bride of the Wilderness (Christopher's ancestors)
2. Last Supper [in part] (Christopher's parents)
3. Christopher's Ghosts
4. The Miernik Dossier
5. Secret Lovers
6. The Tears of Autumn
7. Last Supper [in part]
8. The Better Angels
9. Second Sight (Christopher is a peripheral character)
10. Shelley's Heart
11. Old Boys (Christopher is a peripheral character)

== Reception ==
The Wall Street Journal described McCarry in 2013 as "the dean of American spy writers". The New Republic magazine called him "poet laureate of the CIA"; and Otto Penzler described him as "the greatest espionage writer that America has ever produced." Jonathan Yardley, Pulitzer Prize-winning critic for the Washington Post, calls him a "'serious' novelist" whose work may include "the best novel ever written about life in high-stakes Washington, D.C." In 2004 P. J. O'Rourke called him "the best modern writer on the subject of intrigue."

== Adaptations ==
The film Wrong is Right (1982), starring Sean Connery, was loosely based on McCarry's novel, The Better Angels (1979).

== Other books and publications ==
=== Non-Paul Christopher novels ===
- Lucky Bastard (1999). A comic novel in which a likeable but amoral, devious, and oversexed politician (thought by many to evoke Bill Clinton, when in fact McCarry himself said he was thinking about John F Kennedy.) is controlled by a female eastern-bloc subversive.
- Ark (2011). Earth's wealthiest man attempts to save humanity from a coming apocalypse.
- The Shanghai Factor (2013). A rookie spy in China is drawn into the lonely, compartmentalized world of counterintelligence, and misunderstands everything that he and those around him are doing.
- The Mulberry Bush (2015). Explores the world of South America's elites and militant revolutionaries, and the role of lifelong personal passions and agendas in their work and that of intelligence operatives.

=== Non-fiction ===
- Citizen Nader (1972)
- Double Eagle: Ben Abruzzo, Maxie Anderson, Larry Newman (1979)
- The Great Southwest (1980)
- Isles of the Caribbean (National Geographic Society, Washington, DC, 1980, co-author)
- For the Record: From Wall Street to Washington (1988, by Donald Regan with Charles McCarry)
- Paths of Resistance: The Art and Craft of the Political Novel (1989, with Isabel Allende, Marge Piercy, Robert Stone and Gore Vidal)
- Inner Circles: How America Changed the World: a Memoir (1992, by Alexander Haig with Charles McCarry)
- Caveat: Realism, Reagan, and Foreign Policy (1984, by Alexander Haig with Charles McCarry). Stories include: In March 1981, shortly after taking office, Ronald Reagan was shot; Secretary of State Haig appeared in the White House press room and announced, "I am in charge here!"
- From the Field: A Collection of Writings from National Geographic (1997, editor)

=== Collections including McCarry's work ===
- Harlan Coben, ed. The Best American Mystery Stories: 2011 − includes "The End of the String."
- Alan Furst, editor The Book of Spies − includes excerpt from The Tears of Autumn.

Otto Penzler, editor:

- Agents of Treachery − includes "The End of the Sting."
- The 50 Greatest Mysteries of All Time − includes "The Hand of Carlos"
- The Big Book of Espionage − includes "The Hand of Carlos"

=== Short stories (fiction) ===
- "The Saint Who Said No", Saturday Evening Post, December 9, 1961
- "The Hand of Carlos", Armchair Detective (1992)
- "The End of the String"

=== Magazine articles (non-fiction) ===
- "A ... Week on the Road With Ralph Nader", Life magazine, January 21, 1972
- "John Rennon’s Excrusive Gloupie: On the load to briss with the Yoko nobody Onos", Esquire magazine, December 1, 1970
