= The Miernik Dossier =

1973 novel by Charles McCarry

- First edition
- Author: Charles McCarry
- Language: English
- Series: Paul Christopher
- Genre: Spy novel
- Published: 1973
- Publication place: United States
- Followed by: The Tears of Autumn

The Miernik Dossier, published by the Saturday Review Press in 1973, was the first of seven novels by the American novelist Charles McCarry featuring an American intelligence agent named Paul Christopher. Set in 1959 in Europe and Africa during the days of the Cold War, it is narrated in the form of reports, overheard conversations, and various documents from a multitude of sources of different nationalities, supposedly giving the reader an authentic picture of what an actual intelligence operation might be like. McCarry had previously been an undercover operative for the Central Intelligence Agency for nine years, and the book was hailed for its apparent authenticity and realistic depiction of tradecraft. It received excellent reviews, and instantly established McCarry's reputation as one of the foremost American novelists of espionage. Later books by McCarry, nine more in all, expanded from focusing solely on Christopher into what might be considered a chronicle of the Christopher universe: two novels feature his cousins, the Hubbards, and in many of the other Christopher novels his father, mother, one-time wife, and daughter play important and recurring roles. Also in this universe is a 1988 historical novel, The Bride of the Wilderness, about Christopher's ancestors in 17th-century England, France, and Massachusetts. Like all of McCarry's books, this one displays "an almost Jamesian awareness of [its] European locale, the special authenticity of a loving expatriate writing of an adopted foreign land."

== Paul Christopher ==
This book introduces Paul Christopher, who will go on to be the main character in another six novels. Document #4 says that he is "An American under deep cover in Geneva", presumably with a cover job in the World Research Organization, a branch of the United Nations; his post, however, is unspecified. In future novels he becomes richly portrayed, with an elaborately detailed family life in pre-War Berlin that plays an important role in some of the books. In The Miernik Dossier, however, he is little more than a nonentity, an intelligent, capable, relatively youthful American agent that his superiors think highly of. Cool and detached, he rarely shows his emotions, even with those who love him. At the end of the book he spends 47 days in Geneva with a beautiful girl who shows romantic interest in him. They eventually begin a sexual relationship.

I opened my eyes and saw his face above me. It was the first time we had done it in the daylight. In his eyes I saw the truth. I guess he had drunk too much wine or was too tired to save me from it. Paul did not like to make love to me. I waited until he went to sleep, and then I left. Paul never tried to find me.

In this book little is learned about his past: A British agent says that he had been a paratrooper in the U.S. army; another character says that he speaks perfect German, to which Christopher replies that he had studied in Germany; his middle name is said to be Samuel; and Christopher himself says that he has siblings.

While not all of this information is consistent with what is written about him in later (and presumably more authoritative) books, it does not have to be: since Christopher is a professional agent used to dissembling, he does not have to tell the truth when he says he does not resemble his own brothers and sisters (if they exist), or in talking about other details of his past life.

== Critical appraisal ==
At the time of its publication, Newgate Callendar, the weekly mystery reviewer of the New York Times, called it "a fast-moving tale of Byzantine intrigue" and said that Miernik himself was "continuously interesting".

Then, 15 years later, reviewing a non-Christopher novel by McCarry in the Times, John Gross wrote in 1988:

Charles McCarry's first novel, The Miernik Dossier, which was published in 1973, is arguably the finest modern American spy story, the only one that matches the leading British masters of the genre in subtlety and ingenuity. It featured an agent called Paul Christopher, and Christopher's adventures form the basis of four subsequent novels by Mr. McCarry, none quite as good as The Miernik Dossier, but all far superior to the average cloak-and-dagger concoction.

Writing in the Wall Street Journal in 2009, the noted contemporary thriller writer Alan Furst called it number two of the five best spy novels ever written:

It is a travelogue that bristles with suspicion and deception—but don’t listen to me, listen to a certain highly acclaimed spy novelist who reviewed McCarry’s literary debut: "The level of reality it achieves is high indeed; it is superbly constructed, wholly convincing, and displays insights that are distinctly refreshing. A new and very welcome talent." Good call, Eric Ambler.

Eric Ambler, of course, was the most widely known spy novelist of an earlier generation.

In the magisterial Twentieth Century Crime and Mystery Writers, George Grella called it "something of a masterpiece, a novel of espionage that succeeds at every ambitious level the author attempts and reverberates with possibility". He goes on to say:

The Miernik Dossier is indeed a dossier, but demonstrates an artfulness and meaning that its documentary authenticity suggests without belaboring: it is truly a remarkable book, one of the finest novels of espionage to appear in recent years. If McCarry continues to write as well in the future, he may turn out to be the American John le Carré; there is no higher praise a spy novelist can earn.

== Narrative structure ==
The form of the narrative is a variation of the epistolary novel, whose roots in English go back at least to Samuel Richardson's novels Pamela (1740) and Clarissa (1749). Epistolary novels generally consist of letters written by one or more of the characters. Variations such as Bram Stoker's famous vampire novel, Dracula, (1897) added other entries to the traditional letters: telegrams, diaries, newspaper clippings, and doctor's notes among others. The mystery/thriller field has a long tradition of using the epistolary form, notable examples being Wilkie Collins's The Moonstone (1868) and Michael Innes's Lament for a Maker (1938). In The Miernik Dossier, we are told in an Introductory Note, "The attached dossier is submitted to the Committee in response to the request by its Chairman for a 'complete picture of a typical operation.'" The true nature of the committee is never revealed, however, judging from the documents that make up the book, it is likely connected with American intelligence or its oversight. The book itself consists of 89 documents presented in chronological order: reports by various intelligent agents to their superiors, reports by the agents' case officers, intercepted telephone calls between agents and case officers of various nationalities, debriefings, diary entries, reports by a police officer, a few actual letters, and various other devices. As in most epistolary novels, one of the most unrealistic aspects is the long reports and letters being penned in a few hours late at night in the midst of trying circumstance, always in a flawless literary narrative style. In this book, the entries of the protagonist, Paul Christopher, an American agent, and of Tadeusz Miernik, a Polish historian and possible agent, the subject of the titular Dossier, are particularly unlikely, both in their length and their literary polish. This is, however, an almost unavoidable convention of the genre.

== Plot ==
The plot incorporates two basic threads. Underlying everything is a Muslim terrorist group in Sudan called the Anointed Liberation Front, whose goal is overthrowing the legitimate government. Western intelligence agents believe the terrorists are being directed and armed by the Soviets—their goal is to both destroy the group and to bring the Soviets into discredit. The story itself, however, begins in Geneva, with a Polish historian who works for the UN's World Research Organization named Tadeusz Miernik. He has a number of friends, most of whom are associated with various intelligence agencies. The main thread of the book soon becomes clear: is Miernik exactly what he claims to be, a simple historian, or is he a Soviet agent, working either for Polish intelligence or for the Soviets themselves? His actions throughout the book are ambiguous; even his diaries give no clear answer. The most vivid character in the book is Kalash el Khatar, a tall, black, flamboyant, Oxford-educated Sudanese prince who considers all whites and their ways to be distinctly inferior. Miernik is ordered to return to Poland. He tells the others that he is fearful for his life if he does so and seeks refuge in the West. El Khatar has been given a Cadillac limousine to deliver to his father, a powerful sect leader in the Sudan. He decides to ship the car across the Mediterranean to Cairo, then personally drive it to the Sudan. Miernik, Christopher, and others join the proposed trip; most of the book is an account of their journey. Along the way, Christopher makes a brief detour to penetrate Communist Czechoslovakia at Miernik's behest to apparently rescue his beautiful sister from the Communist regime. Eventually, the disparate group arrives in Sudan, at the feudal castle of el Khatar's father. They have successfully evaded murderous bandits—now some of them come into direct contact with elements of the Anointed Liberation Front and the pace of the book picks up. But even as the death toll mounts dramatically, the question still remains: Is Miernik a Soviet operative sent to direct the terrorists, or not?

== Recurring characters ==
Most of McCarry's novels feature recurring characters. The Miernik Dossier is almost an exception to this—only Paul Christopher himself and Kalash el Khatar, the Sudanese prince, ever appear in any of the other stories, with the prince appearing many years later in Old Boys.

== Discrepancies in the Christopher saga ==
McCarry apparently wrote The Miernik Dossier with no idea that Christopher would go on to become the hero of future novels.

As the Christopher saga expanded and background details were fleshed in, discrepancies arose between the newer books and what the reader had been told about Christopher in earlier books, including this one.

The Last Supper, published in 1983, begins with a long section about Christopher's parents and his birth and upbringing in post-World War I Weimar Germany. Not only is it clear that he has no brothers or sisters, McCarry even has a disclaimer at the end of the book:

In an earlier novel, Christopher was said to have an older brother, his parents' favorite child. Readers of The Last Supper will recognize that this was unfounded gossip.

However, since Christopher is a professional agent used to dissembling, he is not obligated tell the truth when talking about his past life.

== Sources ==
- McCarry, Charles (October 30, 2007), Miernik Dossier, The Overlook Press, ISBN 978-1-59020-375-0
