= The Shape of Water (novel) =

1994 novel by Andrea Camilleri

- Italian first edition cover
- Author: Andrea Camilleri
- Original title: La forma dell'acqua
- Translator: Stephen Sartarelli
- Language: Italian; Sicilian
- Series: Inspector Salvo Montalbano, #1
- Genre: Crime; mystery novel
- Publisher: Sellerio (Italy)
- Publication date: 10 March 1994
- Publication place: Italy
- English publication date: 2002
- Media type: Print (hardcover, paperback)
- Pages: 173 (orig.); 256 (Eng. trans.)
- ISBN: 0-330-49286-1 (Eng. trans.)
- OCLC: 59316518
- Followed by: The Terracotta Dog

The Shape of Water (Italian: La forma dell'acqua) is a 1994 novel by Andrea Camilleri, translated into English in 2002 by Stephen Sartarelli. It is the first novel of the Inspector Montalbano series.

== Plot summary ==
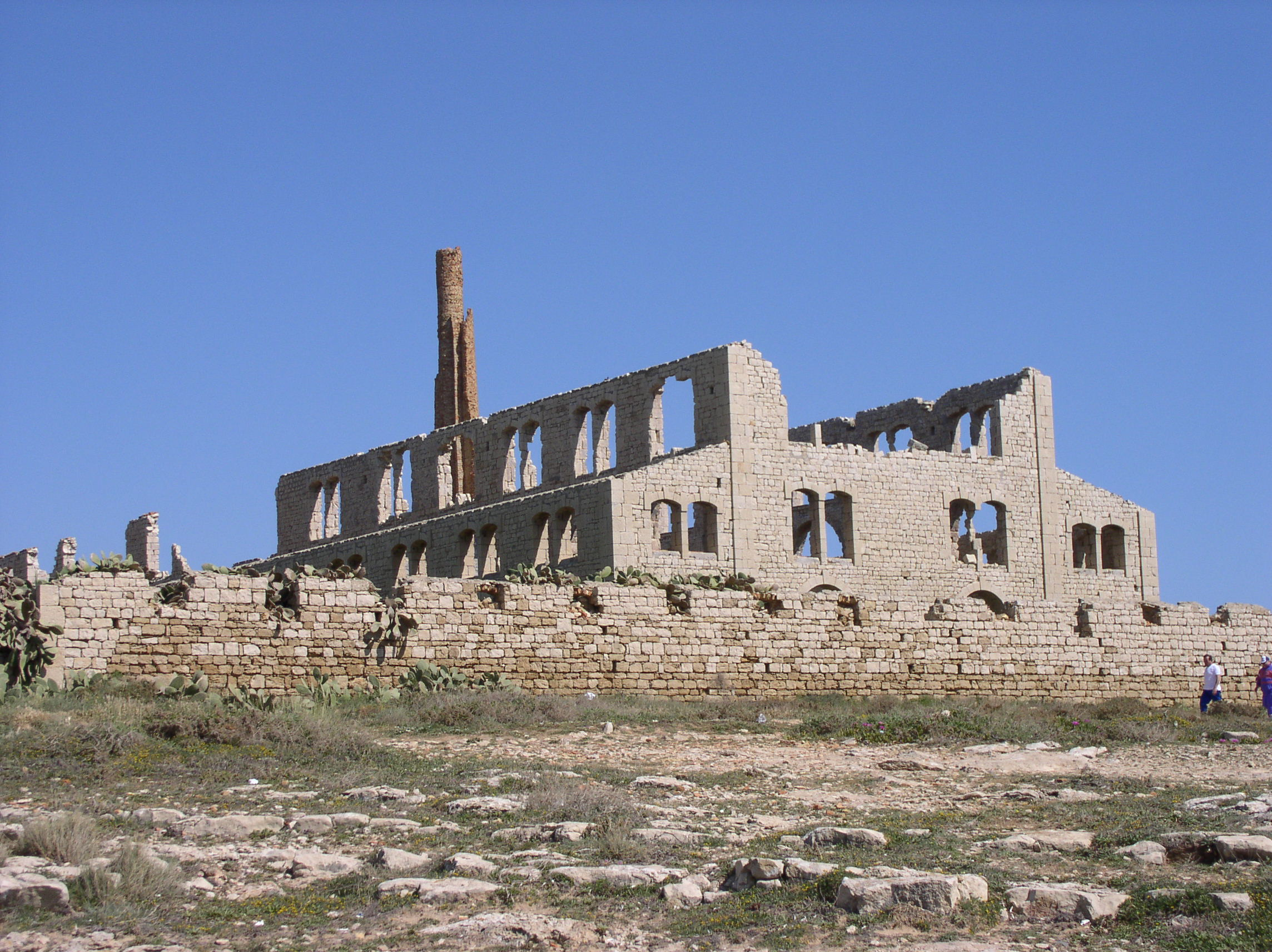
The Mànnara where Luparello's found dead (location used in the TV series)

Silvio Luparello, an engineer, developer and aspiring politician from an aristocratic construction family, dies of a heart attack while having sex with his nephew and lover Giorgio at his beach house. The nephew panics, and, wanting to protect his uncle from the embarrassing circumstance of his death and not trusting himself to be able to move his uncle's body due to his epilepsy, calls his uncle's friend and political crony, Attorney Rizzo, for help. Rizzo assures the nephew he will take care of it, but then, instead of trying to help, attempts to take advantage of the situation and betrays his friendship with Luparello by attempting to use his death to gain leverage over his political opponent, Secretary Cardamone. This he does by attempting to cast Cardamone's Swedish daughter-in-law Ingrid as Luparello's lover and implicating her in his death – at the scene of a seamy outdoor brothel.

The film version starts off the morning after the death at the outdoor brothel, with two surveyors working as garbage collectors. They discover the body and contact Attorney Rizzo in an attempt to curry favor with him and maybe get proper surveyor's jobs by giving him the chance to move Luparello's body in order to avoid the embarrassment of Luparello being found at the outdoor brothel, dead with his pants down. Rizzo rebuffs the garbage men, much to their surprise, as he is known to be Luparello's friend and ally.

Meanwhile, one of the garbage men finds Ingrid's very valuable solid gold jewel-encrusted necklace, planted by Rizzo's Ingrid look-alike as part of the frame-up. The handbag with her initials in which she normally kept the necklace was also planted at the brothel in case somebody walked off with the necklace.

Montalbano, with the help of his boyhood friend and outdoor brothel pimp Gegè, and with the help of Luparello's wife (who tips Montalbano to the fact that somebody must have dressed Luparello because his underwear was on inside out), figures out that the garbage men have the necklace and also that Attorney Rizzo is the bad guy. Montalbano initially suspects Ingrid's involvement because of her relationship with Luparello which he formerly thought sexual, but she convinces Montalbano that she wasn't involved. Montalbano then destroys the planted evidence against her and makes sure that Rizzo pays a reward for the necklace (so that the garbage man and his wife can send their sick child out of the country for proper medical treatment).

The story wraps up with Montalbano "playing God" by ignoring a gun that he finds in the beach house, thus giving Giorgio the opportunity to avenge his uncle's betrayal by beating up and killing Rizzo. In the end though Giorgio, too, dies – in a car accident – after previously having had one due to an epileptic seizure that required him to wear a neck brace (which we assume is the same one that Montalbano found at the outdoor brothel, and which we also assume was there because of being used by Rizzo and the Ingrid look-alike to make Luparello appear to be alive during the "sex" act at the outdoor brothel).

== Characters ==
- Salvo Montalbano, Vigàta's chief police officer
- Domenico "Mimì" Augello, Montalbano's deputy and close friend
- Giuseppe Fazio, Montalbano's right-hand man
- Agatino Catarella, police officer
- Livia Burlando, Montalbano's eternal girlfriend
- Dr. Pasquano, Vigàta's local forensic pathologist
- Silvio Luparello, engineer, developer and aspiring politician
- Giorgio Luparello, Silvio's nephew
- Attorney Rizzo, Luparello's friend and political crony
- Secretary Cardamone, local politician
- Ingrid Sjostrom, Cardamone's Swedish daughter-in-law
- Gegè Gullotta, Montalbano's boyhood friend and outdoor brothel pimp

== Reception ==
Publishers Weekly said the ending of The Shape of Water might not please readers from the United States in comparison to European readers. Kirkus Reviews said Montalbano was the Italian version of Raymond Chandler's detective Philip Marlowe.

== Adaptation ==
It was first adapted for television by RAI with Luca Zingaretti in the TV series Inspector Montalbano. The episode was first aired on 2 May 2000.
