= Eugène Bizeau =

French poet (1883–1989)

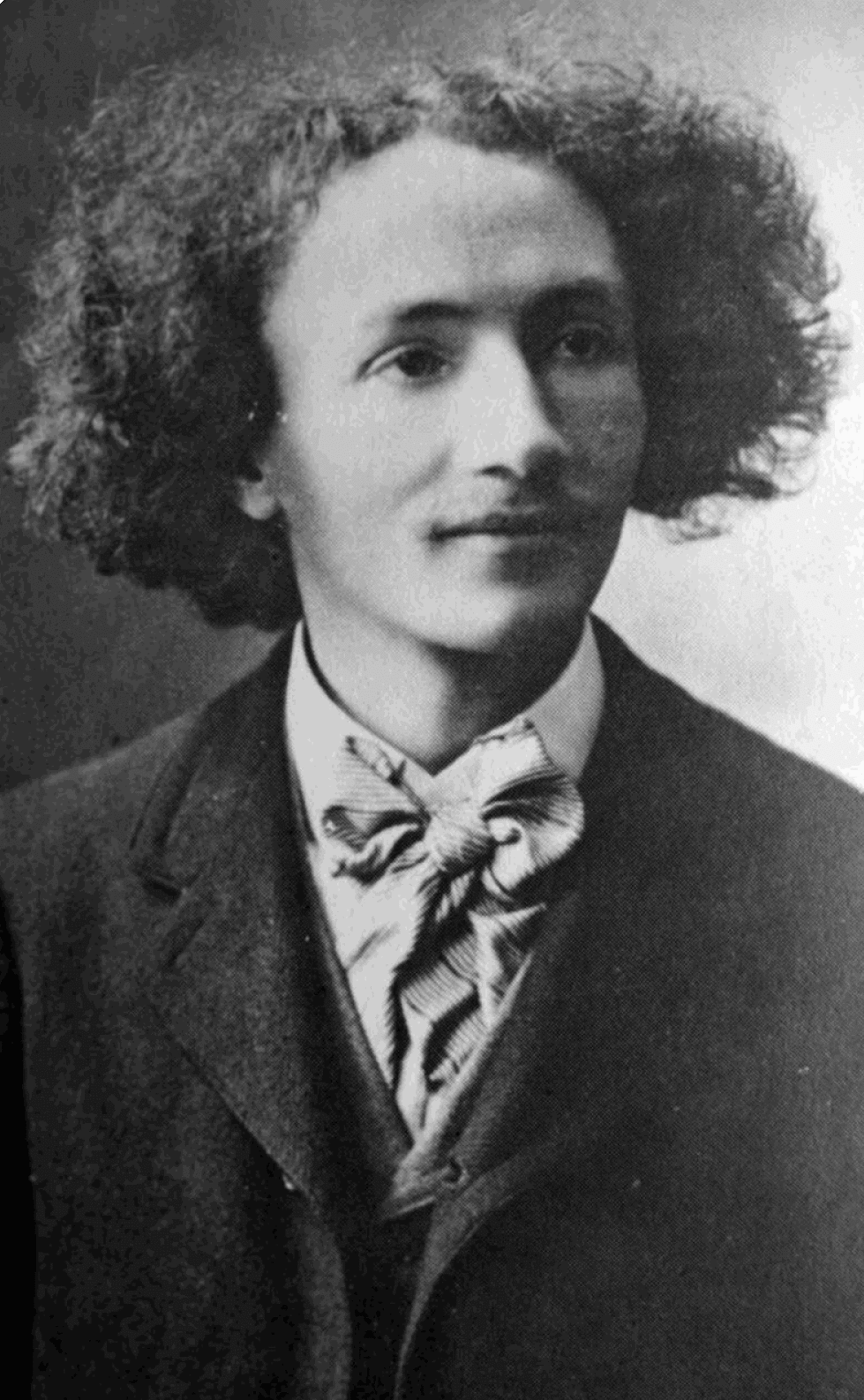
- Eugene Bizeau in 1900
- Born: Max Bizeau; 29 May 1883; Véretz (Indre-et-Loire), France
- Died: 16 April 1989 (aged 105); Tours
- Burial place: Véretz

Eugène Bizeau (29 May 1883 in Véretz – 16 April 1989 in Tours) was a French anarchist poet and chansonnier. He contributed to many periodicals and libertarian newspapers of his time, including le Libertaire. He belonged to the "Muse Rouge" (Red Muse) group with Gaston Couté and Aristide Bruant.

Gérard Pierron in particular put to music and interpreted Bizeau's writing Ferraille à vendre and Il neige sur les mers. Alain Meilland set to music and interpreted Bizeau's Pacifiste text .

Bizeau came from a family of winegrowers and cultivated his vineyard until he was ninety years old. The party hall of Véretz is named after him. Bizeau died in 1989, at the age of 105.

== Biography ==
Eugène Bizeau was born on 29 May 1883, as the second child to a family of Touraine winegrowers and Republicans. Bizeau graduated from primary school at 13 before moving on to various trade jobs including: a servant, stonebreaker, and winegrower. At age 14, he was exposed to libertarian and anarchist publications, including Père Peinard and Le Libertaire.

In 1907, Bizeau began contributing song and poems to the anarchist periodicals: the anarchy of Libertad, The Free Idea, Out of the herd, and the Refractories. He later joined "La Muse Rouge, becoming “one of the best poet-songwriters of the present time". He then published two collections of poems Balbutiements (1910) and Verrues Sociales (1914). In 1914, he began writing pacifist and anti-militarist poems, and began collaboration with Bertoni Louis's Réveil, Pierre Chardon 's Le Semeur, Sébastien Faure 's CQFD, and Armand's (Ernest-Lucien Juin) journals, lasting until 1950s.

In 1916, Bizeau married Adélaïde Chambonnière whom he had met through Armand's journal and later had two children with. At that time, he lived in Massiac, working as a gardener and poet. In an effort to save the anarchists Sacco and Vanzetti from execution, Bizeau wrote in Le Libertaire protesting their execution. In 1929 and 1934, Bizeau's poems were set to music, record, and played on the airwaves of Radio Barcelona during the Spanish Revolution.

In 1944, the Bizeau family moved back to Véretz, returning to work on his vineyard. In 1980-1981, Bizeau participated in the filming of the short film Listen to Bizeau directed by Bernard Baissat, with Robert Brécy acting as the historian. This film revitalized interest in the poet, having releasing not long after Bizeau's 100th birthday. Editions Pirot published a book entitled Eugène Bizeau a cent ans; they later reissued several of his collections.

Eugène Bizeau died on 17 April 1989, at the hospital in Tours, aged 105. He was buried in Véretz.

== Tribute and Honours ==
In 1983, the year of his 100th birthday, Eugène Bizeau was invited by journalist Jacques Erwan to meet, during a debate, with the young public of Printemps de Bourges. As a result, the singers Gérard Pierron, Alain Meilland and Michel Grange created the show Les Cent Printemps des poètes during which they performed Bizeau's poems, which they had set to music (Songe creux – Eugène Bizeau/Gérard Pierron and Pacifiste — Eugène Bizeau/Alain Meilland).

In 1986 the Académie Charles-Cros awarded its prize in the heritage category to this record. Eugène Bizeau was 103 years old.

In 2022, The Historical Society of Véretzois and its surroundings (SHVE), lead in part by Bizeau's great niece Dominique Soulas de Russel, created the Eugène-Bizeau prize.

== Filmography ==
- Robert Brécy and Bernard Baissat, Écoutez Eugène Bizeau, 45 minutes, 1981, Read here.

== Works ==
- Stammerings (Villeneuve-la-Garenne (Seine): Editions of the 'French Luth', 1910.)
- Social warts (Orléans: Imprimerie Ouvrière, 1914.)
- Street Sketches : Poems (Paris: Open Window Editions, 1933.)
- Authorship: poems ( Massiac (Cantal): Editions du 'Nid dans les branches', 1938. (23 January 1939.) )
- War on war! ^{, Christian Pirot editor, Joué-lès-Tours, 1988 (} 105th anniversary edition established by Gérard Pierron, introduction by Robert Brécy, drawings by Cabu), 156 pages
- Social warts, Christian Pirot editor, Joué-lès-Tours, 1988 (edition established by Gérard Pierron, illustrations by Allain Leprest ), 77 pages

== See also ==
- Constant Marie
- Le Réfractaire

== Bibliography ==
- Simonomis: Vous avez dit Bizeau, éditions Dossiers d'Aquitaine, 1986, interview with the then 103-year-old wine poet Eugène Bizeau.
- Gérard Lecha, Jean-Luc Richelle, Eugène Bizeau, vigneron, poète, le Libertaire, La Cause du poulailler, 2015.
- Thierry Maricourt, Histoire de la littérature libertaire en France, Albin Michel, 1990, (pp. 261–264).
- Dictionnaire biographique, mouvement ouvrier, mouvement social: Notice.
- Dictionnaire des anarchistes, "Le Maitron": Notice.
- L'Éphéméride anarchiste: Notice.
