= Série noire =

French publishing imprint

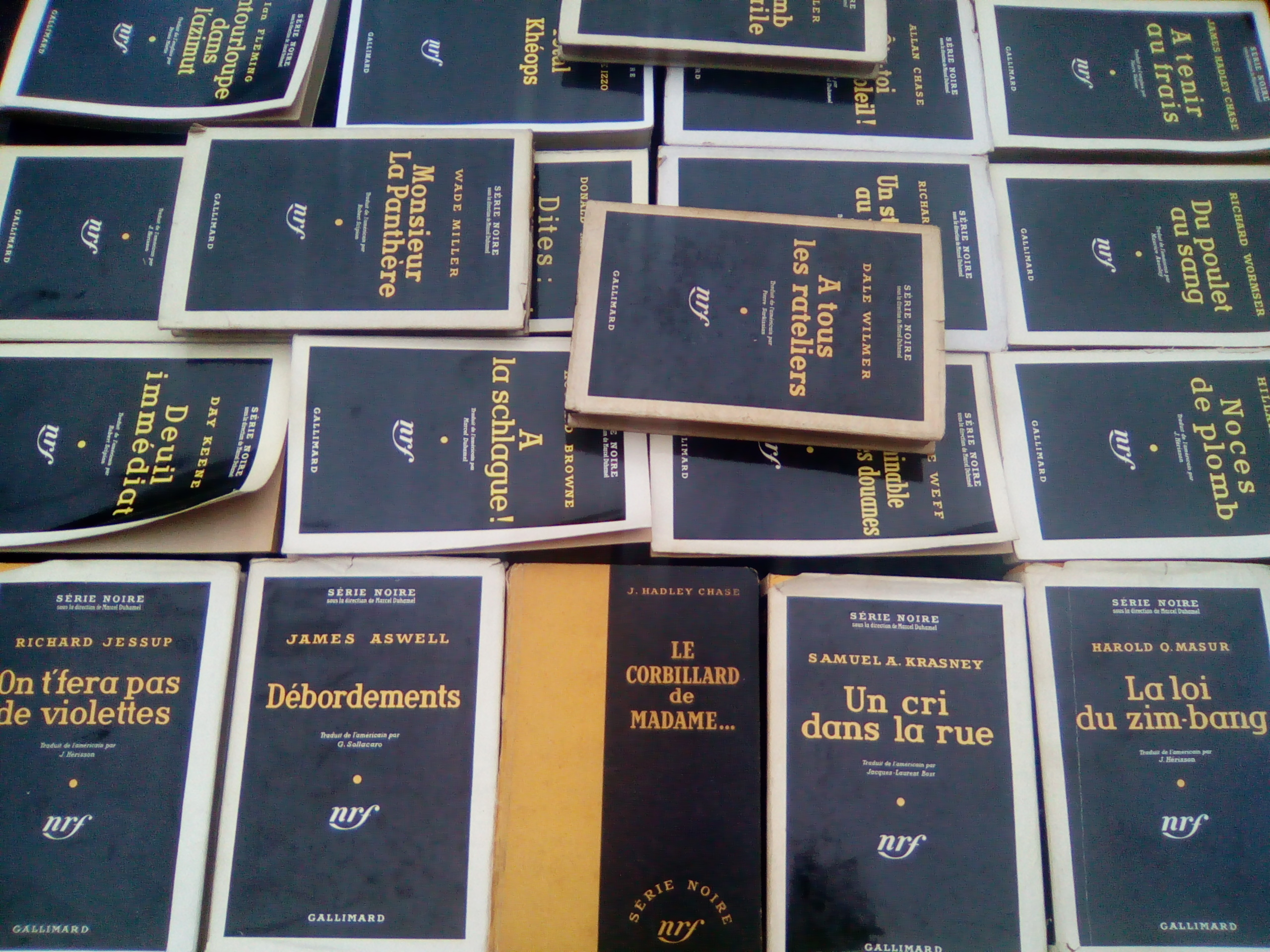
- Série noire book covers on a street bookstand
- Parent company: Éditions Gallimard
- Founded: 1945
- Founder: Marcel Duhamel
- Country of origin: France
- Headquarters location: Paris
- Publication types: Books
- Fiction genres: crime fiction
- Official website: www.gallimard.fr

Série noire is a French publishing imprint, founded in 1945 by Marcel Duhamel. It has released a collection of crime fiction of the hardboiled detective thrillers variety published by Gallimard.

Anglo-American literature forms the bulk of their collection: it features especially Raymond Chandler, Dashiell Hammett, Horace McCoy, William R. Burnett, Ed McBain, Chester Himes, Lou Cameron, Jim Thompson, Rene Brabazon Raymond (under his pseudonym James Hadley Chase) and Peter Cheyney. Books from the series were adapted into episodes on the 1984 television series of the same name.

This name became a generic term for works of detective, and is considered to have inspired the French critic Nino Frank to create in 1946 the phrase "film noir", which describes Hollywood crime dramas.

In common parlance, today, the term also means a series of dramatic events with similarities, or affecting the same victims.
