= Paul Christopher =

English footballer

Personal information
- Full name: Paul Anthony Christopher
- Date of birth: 19 June 1954 (age 72)
- Place of birth: Poole, England
- Position: Forward

Senior career*
Years	Team	Apps	(Gls)
1971–1973	Bournemouth & Boscombe Athletic	0	(0)
1973–1974	Mansfield Town	8	(1)
1974–1983	Salisbury		(108)
1983	Poole Town		
Total		8	(1)
- * Club domestic league appearances and goals

Paul Anthony Christopher (born 19 June 1954) is an English former professional footballer who played in the Football League for Mansfield Town.
