= CWA International Dagger =

Award given by the Crime Writers' Association

- Awarded for: Best translated crime novel of the year.
- Description: An award for the best crime novel translated into English.
- Country: United Kingdom
- Presented by: Crime Writers' Association (CWA)
- Established: 2006
- First award: 2006
- Website: thecwa.co.uk/cwa-dagger-awards/cwa-international-dagger

The CWA International Dagger (formerly known as the Duncan Lawrie International Dagger and the Crime Fiction in Translation Dagger) is an award given by the Crime Writers' Association for best translated crime novel of the year. The winning author and translator receives an ornamental Dagger at an award ceremony held annually.

Until 2005, translated crime novels were eligible to be nominated for the CWA Gold Dagger. From 2006, translated crime fiction was honored with its own award conceived partly to recognize the contribution of the translator in international works. Until 2008 the International Dagger was named for its sponsor, the Duncan Lawrie Private Bank. In three of the first four years it was awarded, it was won by Fred Vargas and her translator Siân Reynolds. In 2013, the Dagger was shared for the first time between two novels, Alex by Pierre Lemaitre and The Ghost Riders of Ordebec by Fred Vargas.

In 2014 the CWA awarded it to The Siege by Arturo Perez-Reverte translated by Frank Wynne.

== Name history ==
- 2006–2008: Duncan Lawrie International Dagger
- 2009–2018: ???
- 2019–?: Crime Fiction in Translation Dagger
- –present: International Dagger

== Winners ==
Winners (in bold) and shortlisted titles.

=== 2000s ===
2006

| Author | Title | Translator | Orig. Pub. Year | Country |
|---|---|---|---|---|
| **Fred Vargas** | **The Three Evangelists** | **Sîan Reynolds** | **1995** | France |
| Andrea Camilleri | Excursion to Tindari | Stephen Sartarelli | 2000 | Italy |
| Yasmina Khadra | Autumn of the Phantoms | Aubrey Botsford | 1998 | Algeria |
| Dominique Manotti | Dead Horsemeat | Amanda Hopkinson and Ros Schwartz | 1997 | France |
| Håkan Nesser | Borkmann's Point | Laurie Thompson | 1994 | Sweden |
| Rafael Reig | Blood on the Saddle | Paul Hammond | 2002 | Spain |

2007

| Author | Title | Translator | Orig. Pub. Year | Country |
|---|---|---|---|---|
| **Fred Vargas** | **Wash This Blood Clean from My Hand** | **Sîan Reynolds** | **2004** | France |
| Karin Alvtegen | Shame | Steven T. Murray | 2005 | Sweden |
| Christian Jungersen | The Exception | Anna Paterson | 2004 | Denmark |
| Yasmina Khadra | The Attack | John Cullen | 2005 | Algeria |
| Åsa Larsson | The Savage Altar | Marlaine Delargy | 2003 | Sweden |
| Jo Nesbø | The Redbreast | Don Bartlett | 2000 | Norway |

2008

| Author | Title | Translator | Orig. Pub. Year | Country |
|---|---|---|---|---|
| **Dominique Manotti** | **Lorraine Connection** | **Amanda Hopkinson** and **Ros Schwartz** | **2006** | France |
| Andrea Camilleri | The Patience of the Spider | Stephen Sartarelli | 2004 | Italy |
| Stieg Larsson | The Girl with the Dragon Tattoo | Reg Keeland | 2005 | Sweden |
| Martin Suter | A Deal with the Devil | Peter Millar | 2006 | Switzerland |
| Fred Vargas | This Night's Foul Work | Sîan Reynolds | 2006 | France |

2009

| Author | Title | Translator | Orig. Pub. Year | Country |
|---|---|---|---|---|
| **Fred Vargas** | **The Chalk Circle Man** | **Sian Reynolds** | **1991** | France |
| Karin Alvtegen | Shadow | McKinley Burnett | 2007 | Sweden |
| Arnaldur Indriðason | Arctic Chill | Bernard Scudder and Victoria Cribb | 2005 | Iceland |
| Stieg Larsson | The Girl Who Played with Fire | Reg Keeland | 2006 | Sweden |
| Jo Nesbø | The Redeemer | Don Bartlett | 2005 | Norway |
| Johan Theorin | Echoes from the Dead | Marlaine Delargy | 2007 | Sweden |

=== 2010s ===
2010

| Author | Title | Translator | Orig. Pub. Year | Country |
|---|---|---|---|---|
| **Johan Theorin** | **The Darkest Room** | **Marlaine Delargy** | **2008** | Sweden |
| Tonino Benacquista | Badfellas | Emily Read | 2004 | France |
| Andrea Camilleri | August Heat | Stephen Sartarelli | 2006 | Italy |
| Arnaldur Indriðason | Hypothermia | Victoria Cribb | 2007 | Iceland |
| Stieg Larsson | The Girl Who Kicked the Hornets' Nest | Reg Keeland | 2006 | Sweden |
| Deon Meyer | Thirteen Hours | K. L. Seegers | 2009 | South Africa |

2011

| Author | Title | Translator | Orig. Pub. Year | Country |
|---|---|---|---|---|
| **Roslund/Hellström** | **Three Seconds** | **Kari Dickson** | **2009** | Sweden |
| Andrea Camilleri | The Wings of the Sphinx | Stephen Sartarelli | 2006 | Italy |
| Ernesto Mallo | Needle in a Haystack | Jethro Soutar | 2006 | Argentina |
| Jean-François Parot | The Saint-Florentin Murders | Howard Curtis | 2004 | France |
| Fred Vargas | An Uncertain Place | Sian Reynolds | 2008 | France |
| Valerio Varesi | River of Shadows | Joseph Farrell | 2003 | Italy |
| Domingo Villar | Death on a Galician Shore | Sonia Soto | 2009 | Spain |

2012

| Author | Title | Translator | Orig. Pub. Year | Country |
|---|---|---|---|---|
| **Andrea Camilleri** | **The Potter's Field** | **Stephen Sartarelli** | **2008** | Italy |
| Maurizio de Giovanni | I Will Have Vengeance | Anne Milano Appel | 2006 | Italy |
| Åsa Larsson | Until Thy Wrath Be Past | Laurie Thompson | 2008 | Sweden |
| Deon Meyer | Trackers | K. L. Seegers | 2010 | South Africa |
| Jo Nesbø | Phantom | Don Bartlett | 2011 | Norway |
| Valerio Varesi | The Dark Valley | Joseph Farrell | 2005 | Italy |

2013

| Author | Title | Translator | Orig. Pub. Year | Country |
|---|---|---|---|---|
| **Pierre Lemaitre** | **Alex** | **Frank Wynne** | **2011** | France |
| **Fred Vargas** | **The Ghost Riders of Ordebec** | **Sîan Reynolds** | **2011** | France |
| Dror Mishani | The Missing File | Steven Cohen | 2011 | Israel |
| Roslund/Hellström | Two Soldiers | Kari Dickson | 2012 | Sweden |
| Ferdinand von Schirach | The Collini Case | Anthea Bell | 2011 | Germany |
| Marco Vichi | Death in Sardinia | Stephen Sartarelli | 2004 | Italy |

2014

| Author | Title | Translator | Orig. Pub. Year | Country |
|---|---|---|---|---|
| **Arturo Pérez-Reverte** | **The Siege** | **Frank Wynne** | **2010** | Spain |
| Arnaldur Indriðason | Strange Shores | Victoria Crib | 2010 | Iceland |
| Pierre Lemaitre | Irène | Frank Wynne | 2006 | France |
| Olivier Truc (fr.) | Forty Days Without Shadow | Louise Rogers LaLaurie | 2012 | France |
| Simon Urban (de.) | Plan D | Katy Derbyshire | 2011 | Germany |
| Fred Vargas | Dog Will Have His Day | Sîan Reynolds | 1996 | France |

2015

| Author | Title | Translator | Orig. Pub. Year | Country |
|---|---|---|---|---|
| **Pierre Lemaitre** | **Camille** | **Frank Wynne** | **2012** | France |
| Andreas Norman | Into A Raging Blaze | Ian Giles | 2013 | Sweden |
| Leif G. W. Persson | Falling Freely, as if in a Dream | Paul Norlen | 2007 | Sweden |
| Deon Meyer | Cobra | K. L. Seegers | 2013 | South Africa |
| Karim Miské | Arab Jazz | Sam Gordon | 2012 | France |
| Dolores Redondo | The Invisible Guardian | Isabelle Kaufeler | 2013 | Spain |

2016

| Author | Title | Translator | Orig. Pub. Year | Country |
|---|---|---|---|---|
| **Pierre Lemaitre** | **The Great Swindle** | **Frank Wynne** | **2013** | France |
| Sascha Arango (de.) | The Truth and Other Lies | Imogen Taylor | 2014 | Germany |
| Deon Meyer | Icarus | K. L. Seegers | 2015 | South Africa |
| Cay Rademacher (de.) | The Murderer in Ruins | Peter Millar | 2011 | Germany |
| Hideo Yokoyama | Six Four | Jonathan Lloyd-Davis | 2013 | Japan |

2017

| Author | Title | Translator | Orig. Pub. Year | Country |
|---|---|---|---|---|
| **Leif G. W. Persson** | **The Dying Detective** | **Neil Smith** | **2010** | Sweden |
| Antonio Manzini (it.) | A Cold Death | Anthony Shugaar | 2015 | Italy |
| Pierre Lemaitre | Blood Wedding | Frank Wynne | 2009 | France |
| Gianrico Carofiglio | A Fine Line | Howard Curtis | 2014 | Italy |
| Fred Vargas | A Climate of Fear | Sian Reynolds | 2015 | France |
| Dolores Redondo | The Legacy of the Bones | Nick Caistor and Lorenza Garcia | 2013 | Spain |

2018

| Author | Title | Translator | Orig. Pub. Year | Country |
|---|---|---|---|---|
| **Henning Mankell** | **After the Fire** | Marlaine Delargy | 2015 | Sweden |
| Oliver Bottini | Zen and the Art of Murder | Jamie Bulloch | 2004 | Germany |
| Pierre Lemaitre | Three Days and a Life | Frank Wynne | 2016 | France |
| Jon Michelet | The Frozen Woman | Don Bartlett | 2001 | Norway |
| Dolores Redondo | Offering to the Storm | Nick Caistor & Lorenza Garcia | 2013 | Spain |
| Fred Vargas | The Accordionist | Sian Reynolds | 1997 | France |

2019

| Author | Title | Translator | Orig. Pub. Year | Country |
|---|---|---|---|---|
| **Dov Alfon** | **A Long Night in Paris** | Daniella Zamir | 2016 | Israel |
| Karin Brynard | Weeping Waters | Maya Fowler & Isobel Dixon | 2009 | South Africa |
| Gianrico Carofiglio | The Cold Summer | Howard Curtis | 2016 | Italy |
| Keigo Higashino | Newcomer | Giles Murray | 2009 | Japan |
| Håkan Nesser | The Root of Evil | Sarah Death | 2007 | Sweden |
| Cay Rademacher | The Forger | Peter Millar | 2013 | Germany |

=== 2020s ===
2020

| Author | Title | Translator | Orig. Pub. Year | Country |
|---|---|---|---|---|
| **Hannelore Cayre** | **The Godmother** | **Stephanie Smee** | 2017 | France |
| Marion Brunet | Summer of Reckoning | Katherine Gregor | 2018 | France |
| K. Ferrari | Like Flies From Afar | Adrian Nathan West | 2011 | Argentina |
| Jorge Galán | November | Jason Wilson Constable | 2015? | El Salvador |
| Sergio Olguín | The Fragility of Bodies | Miranda France | 2010 | Spain |
| Antti Tuomainen | Little Siberia | David Hackston | 2018 | Finland |

2021

| Author | Title | Translator | Orig. Pub. Year | Country |
|---|---|---|---|---|
| **Yun Ko-eun** | **The Disaster Tourist** | Lizzie Buehler | 2013 | South Korea |
| Fredrik Backman | Anxious People | Neil Smith | 2019 | Sweden |
| Roxanne Bouchard | The Coral Bride | David Warriner | 2020 | Canada |
| D.A. Mishani | Three | Jessica Cohen | 2018 | Israel |
| Mikael Niemi | To Cook a Bear | Deborah Bragan-Turner | 2017 | Sweden |
| Agnes Ravatn | The Seven Doors | Rosie Hedger | 2019 | Norway |

2022

| Author | Title | Translator | Orig. Pub. Year | Country |
|---|---|---|---|---|
| **Simone Buchholz** | **Hotel Cartagena** | Rachel Ward | 2019 | Germany |
| Kōtarō Isaka | Bullet Train | Sam Malissa | 2010 | Japan |
| Sacha Naspini | Oxygen | Clarissa Botsford | 2019 | Italy |
| Samira Sedira | People Like Them | Lara Vergnaud | 2021 | Algeria (born) France (reside) |
| Antti Tuomainen | The Rabbit Factor | David Hackston | 2020 | Finland |

2023

| Author | Title | Translator | Orig. Pub. Year | Country |
|---|---|---|---|---|
| **Javier Cercas** | **Even the Darkest Night** | Anne McLean | 2019 | Spain |
| Morgan Audic | Good Reasons to Die | Sam Taylor | 2019 | France |
| Michel Bussi | The Red Notebook | Vineet Lal | 2017 | France |
| Zijin Chen | Bad Kids | Michelle Deeter | 2014 | China |
| Johana Gustawsson | The Bleeding | David Warriner | 2022 | France |
| Hervé Le Tellier | The Anomaly | Adriana Hunter | 2020 | France |

2024

| Author | Title | Translator | Orig. Pub. Year | Country |
|---|---|---|---|---|
| **Maud Ventura** | **My Husband** | **Emma Ramadan** | 2021 | France |
| Juan Gómez-Jurado | Red Queen | Nick Caistor | 2018 | Spain |
| Åsa Larsson | The Sins of Our Fathers | Frank Perry | 2021 | Sweden |
| Cloé Mehdi | Nothing Is Lost | Howard Curtis | 2016 | France |
| Im Seong-sun | The Consultant | An Seong Jae | 2010 | South Korea |
| Yrsa Sigurðardóttir | The Prey | Victoria Cribb | 2020 | Iceland |

2025

| Author | Title | Translator | Orig. Pub. Year | Country |
|---|---|---|---|---|
| **Akira Otani** | **The Night of Baba Yaga** | **Sam Betts** | 2020 | Japan |
| Herve Le Corre | Dogs and Wolves | Howard Curtis | 2017 | France |
| Pierre Lemaitre | Going to the Dogs | Frank Wynne | 2021 | France |
| Satu Rämö | The Clues in the Fjord | Kristian London | 2022 | Finland |
| Azako Yuzuki | Butter | Polly Barton | 2017 | Japan |
| Alia Trabucco Zerán | Clean | Sophie Hughes | 2022 | Chile |

== See also ==
- MWJ Award for Mystery Fiction in Translation
