= Orenda Books =

British publishing house

- Founded: 2014
- Country of origin: United Kingdom
- Headquarters location: London
- Distribution: Turnaround Publisher Services (UK); Trafalgar Square Publishing (US); Affirm Press (Australia)
- Publication types: Books
- Fiction genres: literary and crime fiction
- Official website: orendabooks.co.uk

Orenda Books is a British-based publishing house that publishes literary and crime fiction. The London-based publisher was established in 2014 and publishes debut and existing authors including Ragnar Jónasson, Thomas Enger, Michael Grothaus, Gunnar Staalesen, and Kati Hiekkapelto.

== History ==
Orenda Books was founded in 2014 by Karen Sullivan, the former managing editor at Arcadia Books. Sullivan left Arcadia following a strategic review of the company, which led to Arcadia's publishing list being reduced from fifteen books to only three. In its first year of operations Orenda published six titles, increasing that to sixteen titles in its second year. Sullivan has stated the name Orenda Books was inspired by the title of the Joseph Boyden novel The Orenda and Sullivan's Canadian heritage: "The word itself – which loosely translates as 'the mystical power that drives human accomplishment' – is a nod to my Canadian heritage and a First Nations word whose provenance is a tribe that settled in a part of Ontario where I've spent every summer of my life."

== Titles ==
- Deity by Matt Wesolowski
- There's Only One Danny Garvey by David F. Ross
- Winterkill by Ragnar Jónasson
- Fallen Angels by Gunnar Staalesen
- The Coral Bride by Roxanne Bouchard
- The Creak on the Stairs by Eva Björg Ægisdóttir
- Betrayal by Lilja Sigurðardóttir
- The Seven Doors by Agnes Ravatn
- A Song of Isolation by Michael J. Malone
- The Big Chill by Doug Johnstone
- Hinton Hollow Death Trip by Will Carver
- Ash Mountain by Helen FitzGerald
- The Waiting Rooms by Eve Smith
- Blood Red City by Rod Reynolds
- Sister by Kjell Ola Dahl
- I Am Dust by Louise Beech
- Containment by Vanda Symon
- Deep Dark Night by Steph Broadribb
- Mexico Street by Simone Buchholz
- Beast by Matt Wesolowski
- Death Deserved by Thomas Enger & Jorn Lier Horst
- A Dark Matter by Doug Johnstone
- The Last Stage by Louise Voss
- Violet by SJI Holliday
- Nothing Important Happened Today by Will Carver
- Blood Song by Johana Gustawsson
- In the Absence of Miracles by Michael J. Malone
- The Closer I Get by Paul Burston
- The Home by Sarah Stovell
- Turbulent Wake by Paul E. Hardisty
- Worst Case Scenario by Helen FitzGerald
- Breakers by Doug Johnstone
- The Ringmaster by Vanda Symon
- Call Me Star Girl by Louise Beech
- Welcome to the Heady Heights by David F. Ross
- Beton Rouge by Simone Buchholz
- Changeling by Matt Wesolowski
- Deep Dirty Truth by Steph Broadribb
- The Lingering by SJI Holliday
- Little Siberia by Antti Tuomainen
- Cage by Lilja Sigurðardóttir
- Inborn by Thomas Enger
- A Modern Family by Helga Flatland
- The Courier by Kjell Ola Dahl
- Wolves at the Door by Gunnar Staalesen
- Attend by West Camel
- Good Samaritans by Will Carver
- Trap by Lilja Sigurðardóttir
- After He Died by Michael J. Malone
- Palm Beach Finland by Antti Tuomainen
- The Lion Tamer Who Lost by Louise Beech
- Overkill by Vanda Symon
- Dead of Night by Michael Stanley
- Do No Harm by L V Hay
- Big Sister by Gunnar Staalesen
- Fault Lines by Doug Johnstone
- Absolution by Paul E. Hardisty
- The Old You by Louise Voss
- End Game by Matt Johnson
- The Ice Swimmer by Kjell Ola Dahl
- Keeper by Johana Gustawsson
- We Were the Salt of the Sea by Roxanne Bouchard
- Blue Night by Simone Buchholz
- Killed by Thomas Enger
- Hydra by Matt Wesolowski
- Deep Blue Trouble by Steph Broadribb
- CWA Mystery Tour by Multiple authors
- Whiteout by Ragnar Jónasson
- House of Spines by Michael J. Malone
- The Man Who Died by Antti Tuomainen
- Maria in the Moon by Louise Beech
- Snare by Lilja Sigurðardóttir
- The Other Twin by L V Hay
- Dying to Live by Michael Stanley
- Exquisite by Sarah Stovell
- Wolves in the Dark by Gunnar Staalesen
- Block 46 by Johana Gustawsson
- Reconciliation for the Dead by Paul E. Hardisty
- Deadly Game by Matt Johnson
- Cursed by Thomas Enger
- Six Stories by Matt Wesolowski
- Sealskin by Su Bristow
- Rupture by Ragnar Jónasson
- Deep Down Dead by Steph Broadribb
- The Mine by Antti Tuomainen
- The Exiled by Kati Hiekkapelto
- A Suitable Lie by Michael J. Malone
- Blackout by Ragnar Jónasson
- The Mountain in My Shoe by Louise Beech
- The Bird Tribunal by Agnes Ravatn
- Faithless by Kjell Ola Dahl
- A Death in the Family by Michael Stanley
- Deadly Harvest by Michael Stanley
- In Her Wake by Amanda Jennings
- Epiphany Jones by Michael Grothaus
- The Evolution of Fear by Paul E. Hardisty
- Wicked Game, 'Deadly Game and 'End Game by Matt Johnson
- The Rise & Fall of the Miraculous Vespas by David F. Ross
- Jihadi: A Love Story by Yusuf Toropov
- Where Roses Never Die by Gunnar Staalesen
- Nightblind by Ragnar Jónasson
- How To Be Brave by Louise Beech
- The Defenseless by Kati Hiekkapelto
- We Shall Inherit the Wind by Gunnar Staalesen
- Snowblind by Ragnar Jónasson
- The Last Days of Disco by David F. Ross
- The Abrupt Physics of Dying by Paul E. Hardisty
