= Kari Dickson =

British translator

Kari Dickson is a British translator who specializes in translating works of Norwegian literature into English. She grew up in Edinburgh but spent her summers in Norway with maternal grandparents who did not speak English. She graduated in Scandinavian Studies at UCL, and worked in the theatre for some time. She did literal translations of two Ibsen plays (The Lady from The Sea and Hedda Gabler), which drove her interest in literary translation, eventually leading to an MA degree in translation from the University of Surrey.

Initially she worked as a commercial translator, including several years at the Norwegian central bank. She has since shifted her focus to literature, including literary fiction and non-fiction, Norwegian noir, children's books and stage plays.

She now teaches Norwegian language, literature and translation at the University of Edinburgh.

== Translations ==
- Constance Ørbeck-Nilssen & Akin Düzakin: Fargene som forsvant, Vanishing Colors, 2019, Wm. B. Eerdmans Publishing Co.
- Håkon Øvreås & Øyvind Torseter: Brune, Brown, 2019, Enchanted Lion Books, winner of the American Library Association’s Mildred L. Batchelder Award 2020
- Thomas Enger: Killerinstinkt, Inborn, 2019, Orenda Books
- Rune Christiansen: Fanny og mysteriet i den sørgende skogen, Fanny and the Mystery in the Grieving Forest, 2019, Book*hug Press
- Erika Fatland: The Border
- Erika Fatland: Sovjetistan, Sovietistan, 2019, Maclehose Press
- Thomas Enger: Banesår, Killed, 2018, Orenda
- Gunnhild Øyehaug: Vente, blinke, Wait Blink, 2018, Farrar, Straus & Giroux
- Karin Fossum: Hviskeren, The Whisperer, 2018, Harvill Secker
- Karin Fossum: Helvetesilden, Hellfire, 2017, Harvill Secker
- Hans Olav Lahlum: Mauruemordene, The Anthill Murders, 2017, Mantle
- Gunnhild Øyehaug: Knutar, Knots, 2017, Farrar, Straus & Giroux
- Thomas Enger: Våpenskjold, Cursed, 2017, Orenda Books
- Arne Svingen: Sangen om en brukket nese, The Ballad of a Broken Nose, 2016, Margaret K. McElderry Books
- Hans Olav Lahlum: Kameleonmenneskene, Chameleon People, 2016, Mantle
- Beate Grimsrud: En dåre fri, A Fool, Free, 2015, Head of Zeus
- Selma Lønning Aarø: Jeg kommer snart, I'm Coming, 2015, House of Anansi Press Inc.
- Roslund & Hellström: Three Seconds, winner of the CWA International Dagger 2011
