= Fatland (surname) =

Fatland is a surname. Notable people with the surname include:

- Erika Fatland (born 1983), Norwegian anthropologist, critic and writer
- Ernest R. Fatland (1896–1980), American businessman and politician
- Gunnar Fatland (born 1946), Norwegian politician
