= Robert L. Hilliard =

American veteran, holocaust activist, playwright, author, and communications professor

- Born: June 25, 1925 (age 101); New York City, New York, U.S.
- Education: University of Delaware (1948, B.A.); Case Western Reserve (1949, M.A.) (1950, M.F.A.); Columbia University (1959, PhD)
- Occupations: playwright; journalist; author; professor
- Spouse: JoAnn Reece
- Children: Mark Hilliard, Mara Verheyden-Hilliard
- Writing career
- Years active: 1948–present
- Subjects: Holocaust; Communications; Television; Radio; Extremist websites
- Notable awards: Cambridge Community television, Lifetime Achievement award, Emerson College; Columbia Distinguished Alumni award; Goethe Institute fellowship

Robert L. Hilliard (born June 25, 1925, New York City) is an American World War II veteran, activist, and academic of communication studies. During and directly after World War II, he informed American citizens and politicians of the plight of concentration camp survivors, and of those survivors taken to an unequipped hospital which was formerly St. Ottillien Monastery in the district of Landsberg, Oberbayern Germany. After the war, he became an accomplished academic, playwright, author, and professor of communications and journalism.

== Early life and education ==
Robert Hilliard was born in New York City on June 25, 1925 to Eda Hilliard, a Jewish French immigrant, and Russian immigrant Irving Hilliard. He was raised in a majority-Italian and Irish neighborhood, where he learned to defend himself against other boys and defend more vulnerable peers.

After WWII, Hilliard received his bachelor's degree from the University of Delaware in 1948. He earned two master's degree at Case Western Reserve University: a Masters of Arts (1949) and a Masters of Fine Arts (1950). His PHd. was from Columbia University in 1959, an institution noted for their programs in journalism and the literary arts. In 1960, he followed with postgraduate work at Columbia Teachers College.

== Military service and activism ==
Hilliard was drafted into the U.S. army in February 1944, as a recent high school graduate at the age of 18. He was assigned to the Ninth Regiment of the 2nd Infantry Division. Having received instruction in morse code and radio operation, he was responsible for serving in an advanced unit that would inform American command of the location of the enemy. He was soon wounded by mortar fire, and later served during the bloody combat that took place at the Battle of the Bulge in the Ardennes Forest in December 1944. He was wounded again in spring 1945 by flak from an 88mm German gun, and like many American troops, also suffered from frostbite. He received the Purple Heart for his service in the battle.

== Activism ==
Hilliard's belief in the ability of the media to affect public policy and his lifelong interest in racism and extremist groups may have been shaped by his activism during his Military service, where he was editor of a base newspaper and helped write and publish hundreds of letters hoping to affect American policy. In the immediate aftermath of the German surrender, Hilliard was assigned to the 2nd Air Disarmament Wing, whose aim was to disarm the German Air Force. Hoping only to research a good story for a serviceman's newspaper he founded to provide news for allied troops, in May, 1945, he drove a jeep for miles to attend a concert put on by the newly liberated concentration camp survivors at the hospital at St. Ottillien. He found himself driven to tears by the emaciated and sick survivors of Buchenwald and Dachau, still on stretchers, without food, and wearing the cold, threadbare and inadequate striped uniforms they had formerly been issued as camp inmates. Hilliard and his partner Edward Herman, both Privates in the U.S. Army tried to buy food from the black market to supply the inmates, but the supply was inadequate, and they lacked funds to make a significant improvement in the lives of the survivors. German citizens and American officers judged Hilliard and his compatriots for buying food on the black market, despite their having few, if any other sources. Hilliard and his colleague discovered that significant quantities of the food being sent to the camps by the U.S. Military were often sold to the black market by American servicemen in charge of the camps.

=== Writing letters ===
Risking a court martial, and acting against the stated military policy of refraining from political activities while in the service, Hilliard and a few compatriots wrote and printed hundreds of letters which they hoped would be read by American citizens, and Congressmen informing them of the absence of food, medicine, and clothing available to the surviving concentration camp survivors. To escape the risk of an immediate court martial, the letters had to be sent in bulk to Edward Herman's brother Leonard Herman who had political connections, and a few other Americans who had consented to distribute them to those in power. The letters were all addressed "Dear Friend" as letters from servicemen could only be sent to family and friends. President Truman somehow was given one of the letters, but was initially skeptical of their authenticity.

Despite the urgency of the situation, Truman remained skeptical and did not take immediate action pending a thorough investigation of Hilliard and the claims made in the letters, and referred to an advisor, Earl G. Harrison, a lawyer, Dean of the University of Pennsylvania Law School and the former U.S. Immigration Commissioner under Franklin Roosevelt. About the time Truman received his letter from Hilliard, Harrison had just returned from a tour of Europe where he had been sent to investigate the plight of the displaced refugees and the remaining Jews. Harrison made another investigative trip to Europe. Harrison later confirmed in the Harrison Report of August 1945, four months after their liberation, that "displaced Jews are being held in unsanitary, barbed-wire camps, wearing hideous concentration camp garb or discarded German SS uniforms, with nothing being done for them by way of rehabilitation." The report continued, "One is led to wonder whether the German people, seeing this, are not supposing that we (Americans) are not following or at least condoning Nazi policy." Convinced of the need to act decisively and quickly, Truman spoke immediately to General Eisenhower. Eisenhower sent a full Colonel to inform Hilliard and Edward Herman that the military would address the situation, but that he and Herman should refrain from writing any more letters, as they might end up assigned to a highly undesirable location like the frigid Aleutian Islands. Hilliard, with good reason, took the advice primarily as a threat, rather than a promise to help Holocaust survivors which would require a complete reversal of a few American policies regarding the displaced person camps. He and Herman continued to push their cause of informing the American public and providing food to St. Ottilien. On September 30, 1945, a New York Times headline announced "President Orders Eisenhower to End New Abuse of Jews . . . Likens Our Treatment to that of the Nazis".

=== Truman Directive and change ===
Coming over seven months after the unconditional surrender of Germany, the Truman Directive of December 22, 1945, among other objectives, intended to set the United States as an example to the World by vastly increasing and expediting the admission of displaced persons to the United States, and to open U.S. immigration to full use. It also requested that Great Britain allow 100,000 Jews to immigrate to Mandatory Palestine. Great Britain never acted on this request. On October 21, 1945, 1,500 packages containing food, clothes and medicine arrived at St. Ottillien. The failure of supplies to be delivered prior to October had been partly the result of a U.S. Military and State Department policy to withhold the delivery of the supplies.

Hilliard and Herman also helped to change the policies restricting displaced persons from voluntarily leaving the camps, or being required to return to the countries in which they had formerly resided, where they had no homes, food, property, or the prospect of obtaining employment. Many had also been the victims of post-war violence at the hands of locals who blamed them for the war. At the time, in accordance with official American military policy, the camps were heavily surrounded by barbed wire and guarded by armed American servicemen instructed to shoot escapees, as had the German guards that previously guarded the camps. An American military guard shot an "inmate" of St. Ottilien trying to return to the camp after searching for food in a nearby village. The guard was not reprimanded by his superior officer as he was following orders. According to Hilliard's account, when pressed as to why the American Captain in charge of the guards allowed the "inmate" to be shot, the Captain replied with profanity, "He's only a...Jew. Thats what all Jews deserve!".

== Academic and broadcasting career ==
From 1943 to 1964, Hilliard worked as a professional in theatre, radio and television, while serving in a variety of full-time academic roles. From 1950 to 1956, he was an instructor at Brooklyn College, and from 1956 to 1960, served as an assistant professor at Adelphi University. From 1960 to 1964, he was an associate professor at the University of North Carolina at Chapel Hill. He served for several decades at Emerson College in Boston, first as a Dean of Graduate studies beginning in 1980 and then as a professor at Emerson beginning in 1984.

From 1964 to 1980, he was Chief of Public Broadcasting at the Federal Communications Commission, in Washington D.C., and "was present for the signing of the Public Broadcasting Act in 1967". Simultaneously, he served from 1965 to 1978 as a Chairman of the Federal Interagency Media Committee.

In 2017, Hilliard served on the board of WGCU, an NPR affiliate in Fort Myers, Florida.

=== Extremism studies ===
While serving as a professor at Emerson College in Boston, he collaborated with Boston College Professor Michael Keith, in writing Waves of Rancor: Tuning in the Radical Right. He taught a class at Emerson known as "hate.com", which examined how hate groups target impressionable youth through websites, how they grow, and how they spread rage. Hilliard observed that hate groups on websites build interest slowly with rock music and games, and initially avoid inflammatory rhetoric and epithets. The book was well-received and was read by Bill Clinton during his presidency. In 1993, there were more than 300 extremist websites, though many scholars, including Holocaust author Eli Wiesel, considered their number to be closer to 800. Hilliard both taught at Emerson and served as a Dean.

Hilliard has said that there is "open fascism" in the modern American political right, citing Project 2025 as an example.

== Personal life ==
Hilliard wrote the musical Piccadilly in the late 1940s. The work was first performed in December 2024. The musical details the lives of two G.I.s in London following World War II.

Hilliard lived on Florida's Sanibel Island from 1998 until 2022, when he and his wife JoAnn moved to Fort Myers following Hurricane Ian. He has two children. Hilliard is a member of non-profit Floridians for Democracy. A close observer of post-war Germany, he has been a strong critic of Donald Trump, comparing him to Adolf Hitler.

== Honors ==
While with the U.S. military, Hilliard's decorations included but were not limited to the Purple Heart, Combat Infantry Badge, and Commendation Ribbon.

=== Awards ===
- Ohio Medical Education Network award
- Broadcast Preceptor award
- Kappa Delta Pi, World Communications Year award
- Phi Delta Kappa Annual award
- Cambridge Community television, Lifetime Achievement award, Emerson College
- Columbia Distinguished Alumni award
- Goethe Institute fellowship

== Selected works ==
=== Books ===
- Hilliard, Robert L. (1996). Surviving the Americans: The Continued Struggle of the Jews After Liberation. New York: Seven Stories Press., memoir
- Hilliard Robert, L., Phillipa, fiction, (2010) Parlance Publishing
- Hilliard, Robert L. Selected Plays by Robert Hilliard, Volume 1. (2021) Parlance, ISBN 9780984248964
- Poems of Love and War (2018), poetry collection

==== Media studies (Many in Book form) ====
- Hilliard, Robert L.; Keith, Michael C. (1997). The Broadcast Century: A Biography of American Broadcasting (2nd ed.). Boston: Focal Press. ISBN 978-0-240-80262-6.
- Hilliard, Robert L.; Keith, Michael C. (1999). Waves of Rancor: Tuning into the Radical Right. New York City, Milton Park, Abingdon-on-Thames, Oxfordshire: Routledge Publishing.
- Hilliard, Robert (2000). Writing for Television, Radio, and New Media. Wadsworth.
- Hilliard, Robert L.; Keith, Michael C. (2003). Dirty Discourse: Sex and Indecency in American Radio. Ames, Iowa: Iowa State Press. ISBN 978-0-8138-2409-3.
- Hilliard, Robert L.; Keith, Michael C. (2005). The Quieted Voice: The Rise and Demise of Localism in American Radio. Southern Illinois University Press. ISBN 0813824095.

=== Articles ===
- Hilliard, Robert L. (1956). "The Integration of the Negro Actor on the New York Stage". Educational Theatre Journal. 8 (2): 97–108. doi:10.2307/3203866. ISSN 0013-1989. JSTOR 3203866.
- Hilliard, Robert L. (1957). "Desegregation in Educational Theatre". The Journal of Negro Education. 26 (4): 509–513. doi:10.2307/2293512. ISSN 0022-2984. JSTOR 2293512.
- Hilliard, Robert L. (1958-11-01). "Television and Education". The Journal of Higher Education. 29 (8): 431–470. doi:10.1080/00221546.1958.11779578. ISSN 0022-1546.
- Hilliard, Robert L. (1962-11-01). "The Organization and Control of Educational Television". Peabody Journal of Education. 40 (3): 170–181. doi:10.1080/01619566209537110.
- Hilliard, Robert L. (1963-06-01). "Dramatic Arts Production on Television: Practices and attitudes in the Southeast". Southern Journal of Communication. 28 (4): 285–287. doi:10.1080/10417946309371698.
