= Roxanne Bouchard =

Canadian writer

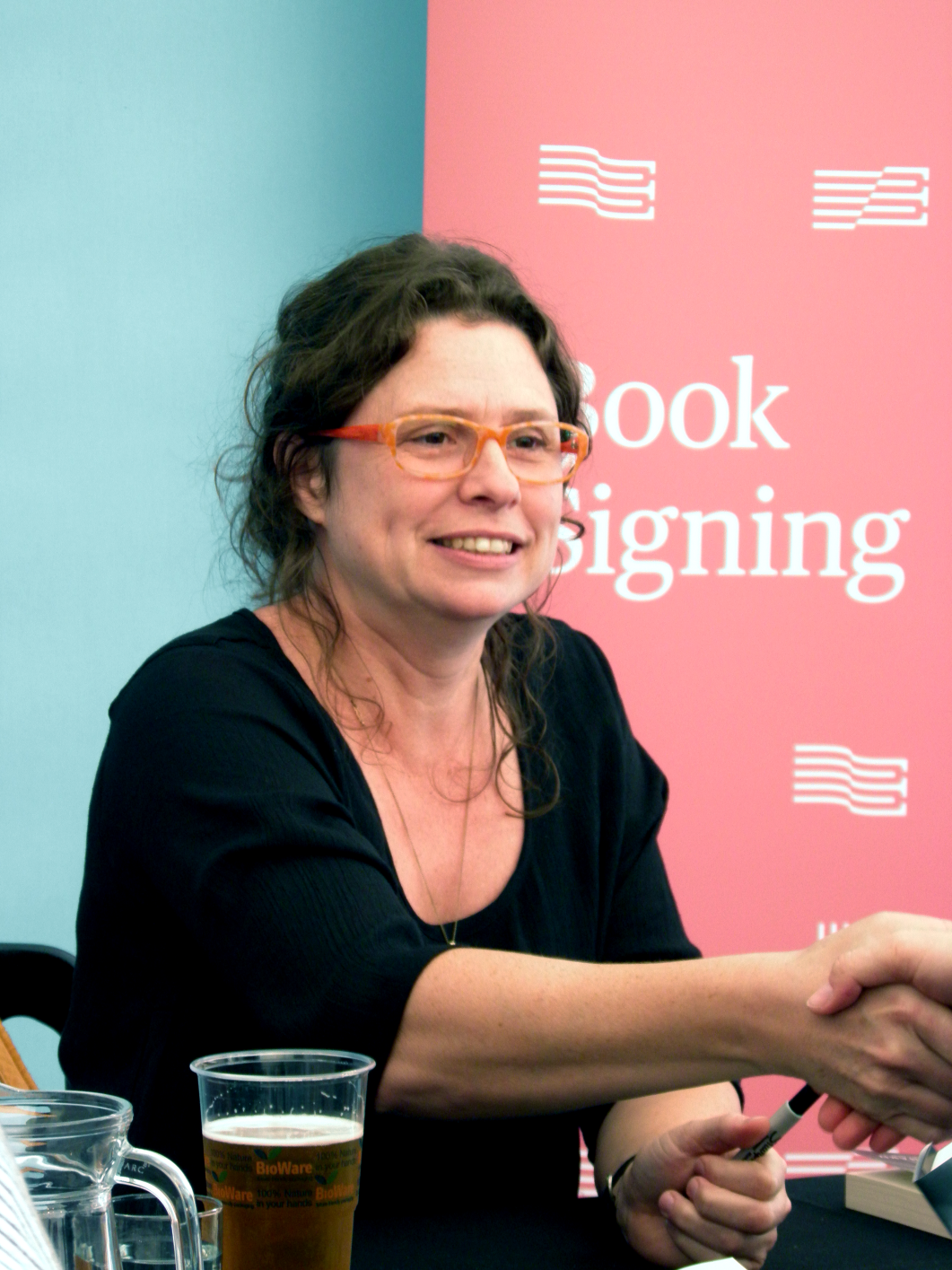
Roxanne Bouchard at the 2018 Edinburgh International Book Festival

Roxanne Bouchard (born 1972) is a Canadian writer and educator from Quebec. She is best known for her series of maritime crime fiction novels centred on the investigations of detective Joaquin Moralès in Quebec's Gaspé Peninsula.

== Early life and education ==
Born in Saint-Jérôme, Quebec in 1972, Roxanne Bouchard studied at the University of Montreal and then obtained a master's degree from Université du Québec à Montréal (UQAM). She has taught literature at the Joliette campus of the Cégep régional de Lanaudière starting in 1994, when she was completing her master's degree at UQAM.

== Literary career ==
Bouchard's first novel, Whisky et paraboles, was published in 2005. The novel won that year's Prix Robert-Cliche, awarded for a French-language novel of a Canadian author who had not published a novel before, as well as the 2007 grand prix de la relève littéraire Archambault, and it was a finalist for the Prix Anne-Hébert, an award for the first French-language novel by a Quebecoise writer.

In 2013, Bouchard published En terrain miné, which covers her five-year exchange of letters with a soldier in Afghanistan, corporal Patrick Kègle. 5 balles dans la tête, published in 2017, contains the recollections of wartime experiences of 25 active or retired members of the Canadian Armed Forces, mostly those who participated in the War in Afghanistan. In writing 5 balles dans la tête, she met with soldiers at CFB Valcartier and had them talk about their experiences, rather than ask them questions. At one point in the research process, in 2013, the memories became so overwhelming that bad dreams prevented her from sleeping and led her to pause her work until January 2014.

=== Detective Moralès series ===
Bouchard is best known for her series of maritime crime novels following the investigations of detective Joaquin Moralès in the Gaspé Peninsula of Quebec. In the first novel of the series, titled Nous étions le sel de la mer (2014), Moralès investigates a body washed up from the sea. The novel was a 2015 Prix France-Québec finalist. Its sequel, La Mariée de corail, was published by Éditions Libre Expression in 2020; in the novel, Moralès investigates the disappearance of a lobster boat captain. The novel won the 2021 Best French Crime Book award from the Crime Writers of Canada and topped the online sales chart of the Académie des lettres du Québec in August 2020. The third novel of the series, Le murmure des hakapiks, was published in 2021. Two parallel and converging storylines make up the novel, one in which Moralès is investigating the assault of a teenager, while her friend Simone Lord, a Fisheries Officer introduced in the previous novel, monitors a seal hunt aboard a trawler. The novel was nominated for the Crime Writers of Canada award for Best French Crime Book in 2022.

English versions of the original French-language novels–We Were the Salt of the Sea (2018), The Coral Bride (2020), and Whisper of the Seals (2022)–were translated by David Warriner and published by British publisher Orenda Books. In 2020, Swiss publisher Atrium Verlag obtained rights for a German-language version of the first two novels. The Coral Bride was longlisted for the 2021 CWA Dagger for Crime Fiction in Translation from the United Kingdom-based Crime Writers' Association.

Nous étions le sel de la mer was selected as the Quebec representative for the 2023 edition of the book debate show Le Combat des livres, where it was defended by actor Gilles Renaud.

== Bibliography ==
=== Novels ===
- — (2005). Whisky et Paraboles. VLB. Reissued in 2008.
- — (2007). La Gifle. Coups de tête.
- — (2012). Crématorium Circus. VLB.
- —; Kègle, Patrick (2012). En terrain miné: orrespondance en temps de guerre. VLB.
- — (2016). J't'aime encore - monologue amoureux. VLB.
- — (2017). Cinq balles dans la tête. Québec Amérique.

=== Detective Moralès series ===
- — (2014). Nous étions le sel de la mer. VLB.
  - English edition: Warriner, David. We Were the Salt of the Sea, Orenda Books, 2018.
- — (2020). La Mariée de corail. Éditions Libre Expression.
  - English edition: Warriner, David. The Coral Bride, Orenda Books, 2020.
- — (2021). Le murmure des hakapiks. Éditions Libre Expression.
  - English edition: Warriner, David. Whisper of the Seals, Orenda Books, 2022.
