= Johana Gustawsson =

French writer

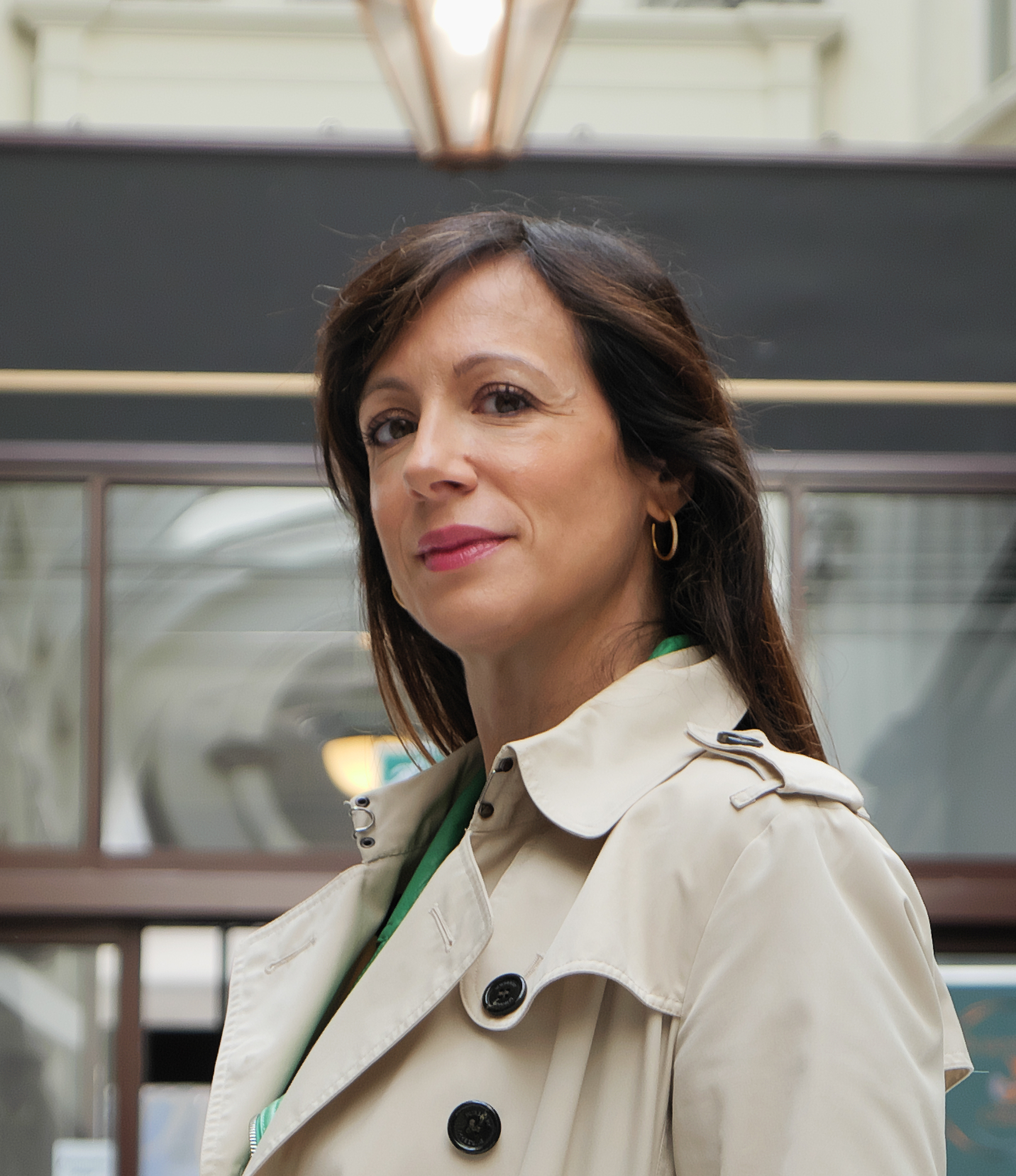
- Gustawsson in 2025
- Born: Johana Lagunas; Marseille, France
- Occupations: Writer, Journalist
- Relatives: Simon Lagunas (paternal grandfather)
- Writing career
- Genres: Crime fiction, Thriller
- Website: en.johanagustawsson.com

Johana Gustawsson is a French crime writer. She was born in Marseille. She studied political science and has worked as a journalist for the French and Spanish press.

She is best known for her Roy & Castells crime series, featuring the profiler Emily Roy and the true-crime writer Alexis Castells. The Roy & Castells books have won numerous prizes and have been published in two dozen countries. The third novel in the series, Blood Song, was longlisted for the CWA International Dagger.

Johana Gustawsson lived in London from 2009 to 2021 with her family and since September 2021, she lives with her Swedish husband and their 3 children in Lidingö, which is an island in the inner Stockholm archipelago, northeast of Stockholm, Sweden.

== Bibliography ==
Roy & Castells series

- Block 46 (2017)
- Keeper (2018)
- Blood Song (2019)

Other crime novels

- The Bleeding (2022)
- Yule Island (2023)
- Scars of Silence (2025)

Collaborations

- Son (with Thomas Enger) (2025)

== Awards and honours ==
- 2016 "Prix des Lecteurs Plume Libre, Plume d'argent". Plume Libre (in French). for Block 46
- 2017 "Prix marseillais du polar". Livres Hebdo (in French). for Block 46
- 2025 Prix Maison de la Presse, for Les Morsures du silence (translated as Scars of Silence)
