= Dina Salústio =

Cape Verdean novelist (born 1941)

Bernardina Oliveira
- Born: 1941 (age 84–85)
- Citizenship: Cabo Verde
- Occupations: Novelist, journalist, short story writer, poet
- Writing career
- Pen name: Dina Salústio
- Notable work: The Madwoman of Serrano
- Notable awards: Rosalía de Castro Award

Dina Salústio (born Bernardina Oliveira; 1941) is a Cape Verdean novelist. She is the first woman from the country to publish a novel, and the first writer from the country to have a novel translated to English.

== Biography ==
Dina Salústio is the pseudonym of Bernardina Oliveira, who was born in 1941 in Santo Antão. After training as a social worker, she worked for the Ministry of Foreign Affairs. She has also worked in Portugal and Angola as a journalist, social worker and teacher.

A prominent literary activist in Cabo Verde, she co-founded the Associação Escritores Cabo-Verdianos, as well as two magazines, Mudjer and Ponto e Vírgula. Her novel A Louca de Serrano was the first novel to be published by a Cabo Verdean woman. Its translation, The Madwoman of Serrano by Jethro Soutar, is the first English translation of a novel from Cabo Verde.

== Awards ==
In 2020, the English translation of A Louca de Serrano was short-listed for The Oxford-Weidenfeld Translation Prize. In 2016, she was presented with a Rosalía de Castro Award for lifetime achievement by PEN Galicia (es). In 1994 she was awarded the national prize for children's literature.

== Reception ==
Salústio's works, both creative and non-fiction, address issues relating to women's rights and Cabo Verdean society and centring female perspectives. Her works are considered an important contribution to postcolonial literature of Cabo Verde. She is also viewed as a writer who counters the masculine perspectives that can be prevalent in African literature.

== Selected works ==
=== Novels ===
- A Louca de Serrano (The Madwoman of Serrano), 1998
- Filhas do Vento (Daughters of the Wind), 2009
- Veromar (See-the-sea), 2019

=== Short stories ===
- Mornas eram as noites (Warm were the Nights), 1994
- Filhos de Deus (God's Children), 2018

=== Non-fiction ===
- Violência contra as mulheres (Violence Against Women), 1994
