= Missing (Alvtegen novel) =

2000 crime fiction novel by Karin Alvtegen

- Author: Karin Alvtegen
- Original title: Saknad
- Language: Swedish
- Genre: crime fiction, psychological thriller
- Set in: Sweden
- Publisher: 2000
- Publication place: Sweden

Missing (Swedish: Saknad ) is a 2000 crime fiction novel by Swedish author Karin Alvtegen. The psychological thriller is set in Alvtegen's native Sweden. It received the 2001 Glass Key award, the Nordic literature award for best crime fiction. The story was translated into English in 2003. It was adapted for television as the 2006 miniseries Missing, directed by Ian Madden and starring Joanne Frogatt and Gregor Fisher.

Missing was nominated for the 2009 Edgar Award for best novel by the Mystery Writers of America.

== Synopsis ==
After walking away from her rich, but dysfunctional family, Sybylla Forenstrom supports herself by scamming wealthy men on the streets of Stockholm. She often preys on visiting businessmen and charms them for a dinner and room. One night however, she chooses the wrong man and wakes up to find him dead and mutilated. Sybylla finds herself in a race against time as she evades the authorities and hunts for the real killer to prove her innocence.

== Publication ==
- Sweden (2000): Saknad, Stockholm : Natur & Kultur/Legenda, 2000, 270p., ISBN 91-27-07966-X
- United Kingdom (2003): Missing, Edinburgh : Canongate, 2003, 249p., ISBN 1-84195-408-X
- United States (2007): Missing, New York : Felony & Mayhem Press, 2008, 295p., ISBN 1-933397-86-1
- Czech Republic (2008): Nezvěstná, Prague : Knižní klub, 2008, 232p., ISBN 978-80-242-2288-2
