= Goethe-Institut Award =

- Awarded for: The best translation of a text from German to English.
- Sponsored by: The Society of Authors and the Goethe Institut, London
- Country: United Kingdom

The Goethe-Institut Award is a biennial literary prize presented by the Society of Authors and the Goethe Institut, London, for the best translation of a text from German to English. Past winners include Kay McBurney, Katy Derbyshire, and Imogen Taylor.

== About ==
The Goethe-Institut Award was established by the Society of Authors in partnership with the Geothe Institut's London branch. The Society of Authors is a British trade union of writers, illustrators, and translators, which, among other activities, awards a number of literary prizes for writing and translation, including the Betty Trask Prize, TA First Translation Prize, Banipal Prize, and others. The Goethe Institut is a non-profit German cultural association, aimed at promoting the German language outside Germany.

The Goethe-Institut Award was established in 2010, and replaced the German Embassy Award for Translators, which was presented by the German Embassy in London. It is presented to British translators, and is awarded for translations from German to English. The prize consists of a cash award of €1,000, and includes attendance at the Leipzig Book Fair and the International Translators' Colloquium in Berlin. It is awarded once every two years. It is focused on early-career translators, and has been described as a "top award for new translators" by the Faculty of Medieval and Modern Languages, University of Oxford.

== Recipients ==
Year	Winner	Runner-up	Jury	Source
2023	Rob Myatt, for his translation of an excerpt from the novel Hund, Wolf, Schakal by Behzad Karim Khani.	Fiona Graham		
2022	Sharon Howe for a translation of an extract from Schwitters by Ulrike Draesner	George Robarts and Robert Sargant	Ruth Ahmedzai Kemp and Steph Morris	
2020	Kay McBurney for a translation of an extract from Die Fahrt by Sibylle Berg		Oliver Kamm, Karen Leeder, and Charlotte Ryland.	
2018	Mandy Wight for a translation of an extract from Unterleuten by Juli Zeh.		Annemarie Goodridge, Eva Hoffman and Oliver Kamm	
2016	Imogen Taylor for a translation of an extract from Momente der Klarheit by Jackie Thomae (Hanser Berlin)		Anthea Bell, Jens Boyer and Paula Johnson	
2014	Caroline Waight for a translation of an extract from Fliehkräfte by Stephan Thome (Suhrkamp).			
2012	Katy Derbyshire for a translation of an extract from the novel Das Geschenk by Wolf Wondratschek (Hanser 2011).	Helen MacCormac.		
2010	Samuel Pakucs Willcocks for a translation of an extract from the novel Du bist zu schnell by Zoran Drvenkar (Klett-Cotta, 2003).	Jamie Lee Searle.		
