= Excursion to Tindari =

Novel by Andrea Camilleri

- Italian first edition cover
- Author: Andrea Camilleri
- Original title: La gita a Tindari
- Translator: Stephen Sartarelli
- Language: Italian/Sicilian
- Series: Inspector Salvo Montalbano, #5
- Genre: Crime, Mystery novel
- Publisher: Sellerio (ITA); Viking (US); Macmillan/Picador (UK)
- Publication date: 18 February 2000
- Publication place: Italy
- English publication date: 2005
- Media type: Print (Hardcover, Paperback)
- Pages: 304 pp 296 pp (Eng. trans.)
- ISBN: 0-330-49302-7 (Eng. trans.)
- OCLC: 62225211
- Preceded by: The Voice of the Violin
- Followed by: The Scent of the Night

Excursion to Tindari (Italian: La gita a Tindari) is a 2000 novel by Andrea Camilleri, translated into English in 2005 by Stephen Sartarelli.

It is the fifth novel in the internationally popular Inspector Montalbano series. In 2006 it was shortlisted for the CWA Duncan Lawrie International Dagger for best translated crime novel of the year.

== Plot summary ==
The story takes place between Vigàta and picturesque site of Tindari, a promontory of historical and archaeological beauty. Montalbano is investigating the mysterious bond that unites a couple and an unrelated man in the same violent death. Thanks to his unique professional insight, and perhaps even more to his feelings as a sensitive man, Montalbano successfully concludes the investigation, moving in between the boundaries set by the world of tradition and that of modernity. In his fifties, examining his life and a future that seems to be saturated with senseless technology and hopeless inhumanity, with corruption and globalisation rendering everything shapeless, Montalbano feels out of place and lonely.

== Adaptation ==
It was first adapted for television by RAI with Luca Zingaretti in the TV series Inspector Montalbano. The episode was aired on 9 May 2001.
