= Shame (Alvtegen novel) =

2005 novel by Karin Alvtegen

- English language first ed.
- Author: Karin Alvtegen
- Original title: Skam
- Translator: Steven T. Murray
- Language: Swedish
- Genre: Crime novel
- Publisher: Canongate (UK)
- Publication date: 2005
- Publication place: Sweden
- English publication date: August 2006 (UK)
- Media type: Print (paperback)
- ISBN: 1-84195-747-X
- OCLC: 69732948
- LC Class: PT9876.1.L92 S5313 2006

Shame is a novel by the Swedish crime-writer Karin Alvtegen, originally published as Skam in Sweden in 2005. It was translated into English by Steven T. Murray in 2006 and was shortlisted for the Duncan Lawrie International Dagger award for crime novels in translation .
