= Missing (2006 TV series) =

- Genre: Crime drama
- Based on: Missing by Karin Alvtegen
- Written by: Jimmy Gardener
- Directed by: Ian Madden
- Starring: Joanne Froggatt; Dean Andrews; Gregor Fisher; Ralph Ineson; Mhairi Morrison; Pip Torrens; Phyllis Logan; Christopher Fulford
- Composer: Ross Campbell
- Country of origin: United Kingdom
- Original language: English
- No. of seasons: 1
- No. of episodes: 2

Production
- Executive producers: Eric Coulter; Alan J. Wands
- Producer: Karen Lewis
- Production location: United Kingdom
- Running time: 90 minutes (inc. advertisements)
- Production company: STV Studios

Original release
- Network: STV; Drama
- Release: 2 November – 9 November 2008

Missing is a British crime drama television series, based on the 2000 novel Missing by crime author Karin Alvtegen, which was first broadcast on STV on 2 November 2008. Despite being filmed for broadcast and shown in the United States in 2006, the series was not aired in its native country until over two years later. Joanne Froggatt, Gregor Fisher and Mhairi Morrison star in the two-part drama (separated into three-parts for repeat viewings), with Froggatt's character, Sybil Foster, becoming the prime suspect in a murder investigation, and Fisher and Morrison's characters acting as the investigating officers. Missing was released on Region 1 DVD on 5 September 2006.

== Plot ==
Sybil Foster (Joanne Froggatt) escapes from a psychiatric hospital, only to find herself the prime suspect in a series of murders. The police investigation, led by DS Doug Duvall (Gregor Fisher) unearths skeletons from her past, and a link to a prominent political figure who may hold the key to unlock the secrets of the past – and open the door to solving the mysteries of the present.

== Production ==
Missing reunites the BAFTA award-winning duo behind BBC2 crime drama The Cops – writer Jimmy Gardner and executive producer Eric Coulter, and is based on the best-selling novel, Missing, by Karin Alvtegen. Missing was first broadcast on STV on 2 and 9 November 2008, after being filmed in 2004. It was originally commissioned as two 90-minutes episodes by ITV, and was delivered to the network in this format, but by this time, ITV had changed the length of its primetime drama slots to 60 minutes. ITV claimed that Missing no longer fitted neatly into the ITV network schedule, and thus chose not to broadcast it. STV chose to use its opt-out facility from the network, to screen Missing nearly four years later, in place of Sharpe's Peril, which was receiving its network broadcast on ITV.

Missing had previously been screened in the United States in August 2006, and was distributed by Koch. It was later released on DVD exclusively in the region on 5 September 2006. The series was later repeated on STV in three-parts of 60-minutes each, on 2, 3 and 10 September 2014. Missing later received its official UK premiere on UKTV Drama, being broadcast in the original two-part format of 90-minutes per episode.

== Cast ==
- Joanne Froggatt as Sybil Foster
- Dean Andrews as Mark Lanser
- Gregor Fisher as DS Doug Duvall
- Ralph Ineson as DCI John Carter
- Mhairi Morrison as DC Mairi Wilson
- Pip Torrens as Derek Mailer
- Phyllis Logan as Karen Foster
- Christopher Fulford as Dr. Webster

== Episode list ==
No.	Title	Directed by	Written by	Original release date	UK viewers (millions)
1	"Episode 1"	Ian Madden	Jimmy Gardener	2 November 2008	N/A
Streetwise Sybil Foster finds herself accused of murder after escaping from a mental institution where she was being held. The struggle to avoid capture begins to threaten her own sanity. Meanwhile, DS Duvall's investigation begins to gather momentum as the hunt for Sybil gets underway.
2	"Episode 2"	Ian Madden	Jimmy Gardener	9 November 2008	N/A
With another man dead, the evidence begins to mount against Sybil, sending her mind into overdrive – to the point where she begins to question her own innocence. But when she strikes a chord with the compassionate DS Duvall, he begins to realise that there is more to her than meets the eye.
