= Valerio Varesi =

Italian author of crime novels

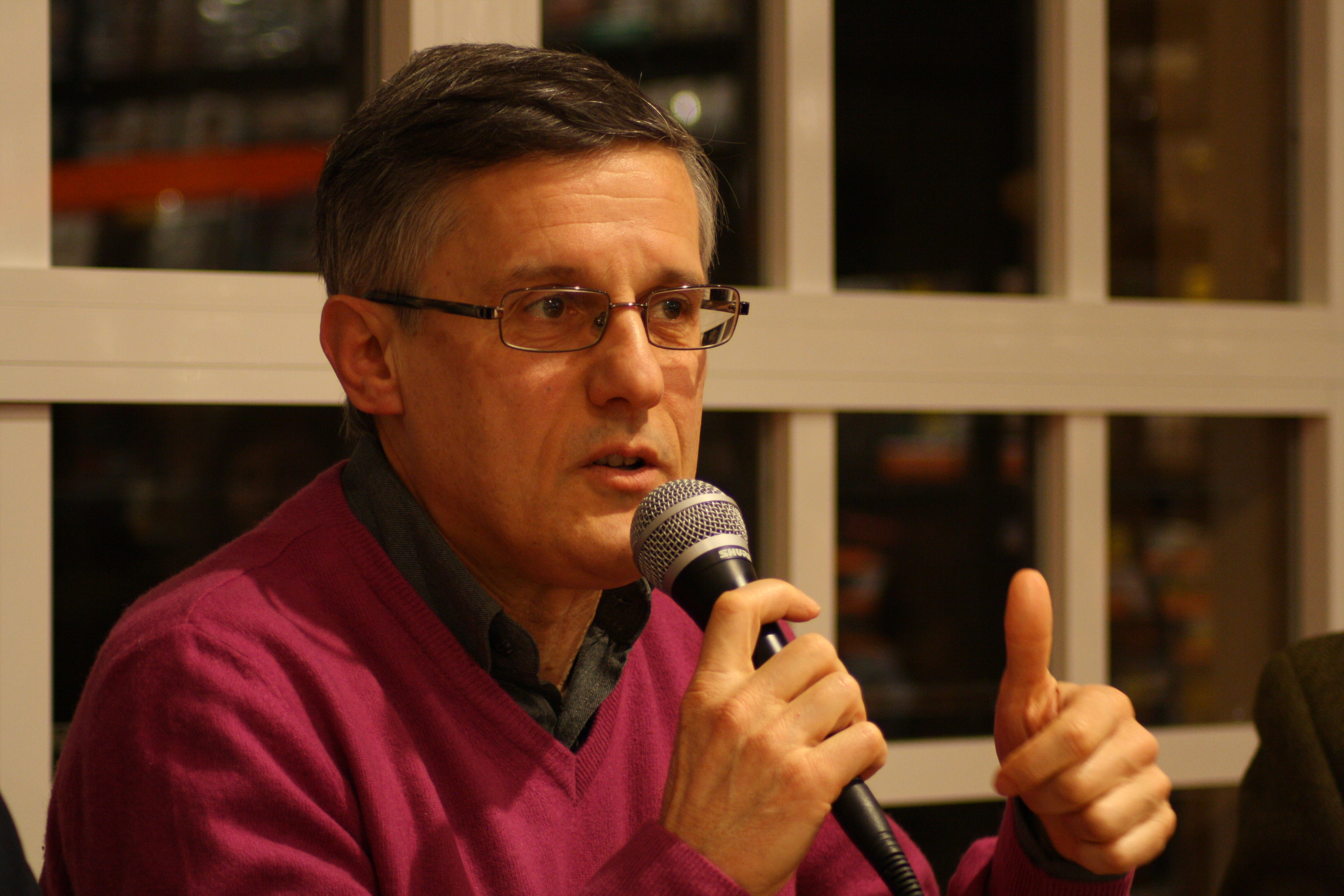
Valerio Varesi

Valerio Varesi is an Italian author of crime novels. So far six of his novels have been published in English, the first two of which were shortlisted for the CWA International Dagger. His novels have all been bestsellers in the original Italian. He is a journalist with La Repubblica.

== Bibliography ==
Books published in English:

- River of Shadows
- The Dark Valley
- Gold, Frankincense and Dust
- A Woman Much Missed
- The Lizard Strategy
- The Unseen

The Book Depository
