= Society of Authors =

United Kingdom trade union

- The Society of Authors
- Founded: 1884; 142 years ago
- Headquarters: London, UK
- Location: United Kingdom
- Members: ▲12,390 (2024)
- General Secretary: Anna Ganley
- Chair: Vanessa Fox O'Loughlin
- Affiliations: EWC
- Website: societyofauthors.org

The Society of Authors (SoA) is a United Kingdom trade union for professional writers, illustrators and literary translators, founded in 1884 to protect the rights and further the interests of authors. Membership of the society is open to "anyone who creates work for publication, broadcast or performance" and the society both gives individual advice and 'voices concerns' about 'authors’ rights, the publishing and creative industries and wider cultural matters.' In 2024 membership stood at 12,500. The SoA is a company on the special register body and an affiliated trade union.

Members of SoA have included Tennyson (first president), George Bernard Shaw, John Galsworthy, Alasdair Gray, John Edward Masefield, Thomas Hardy, H. G. Wells, J. M. Barrie and E. M. Forster. Contemporary members include Malorie Blackman, Philip Gross, and Lemn Sissay.

== History ==
=== Foundation ===
The Society of Authors was established in 1884 at a time when copyright law and the idea of literary property were becoming established. In September 1883 a working party of 12 fellow members of the Savile Club was formed. On 18 February 1884, the first General Meeting of The Incorporated Society of Authors took place. A Management Committee was elected with Walter Besant as Chair. A Council of 18 members was also appointed and Alfred Lord Tennyson became the first President. This structure endured until 2012 when the Council became nominal with powers only to elect the President, In 2022 the society made the position of president 'honorary' with a three year term only. At the same time members of the Council were renamed 'Fellows'.

In 1890 the society founded its quarterly journal, The Author, with Walter Besant as the first editor. He was succeeded by author C. R. Hewitt (writing as "C. H. Rolph"), and the journal is currently edited by James McConnachie.

In 1958, the Translators Association (TA) was established as a specialist group within the Society of Authors.

=== Campaigns and events ===
The SoA has focused on author pay and conditions. In 2015–16, the SoA led a campaign for writers to be paid at literary festivals. President Philip Pullman resigned as patron of the Oxford Literary Festival in protest against the festival's non-payment of authors.

During the Covid pandemic 2020–21 the society focused on author income and wellbeing, pushing for government financial support and distributing more than £1.7million from its Authors’ Contingency Fund.

Since 2019, the society has called for protection for authors in the use of internet archives. More recently, working with the Authors' Licencing and Collecting Society (ALCS), it has called for the payment of authors whose work is used to create AI programs.

Philip Pullman resigned his presidency of the society in March 2022 after social media statements he had made were taken as representing the views of the society, and he felt that he would not be free to express personal opinions if he remained in the role. The office of presidency was adjusted and remains vacant.

In August 2022, the Society described itself as "absolutely committed" to condemning personal attacks made against authors over issues of free expression. This statement was made in response to an open letter signed by over 100 writers and industry members criticised what they saw as the Society's "abject failure to speak out on violent threats towards its members", following the stabbing of Salman Rushdie and a death threat against J K Rowling. The letter said the Society and its chair Joanne Harris had been "captured by gender ideologues". Hundreds of others signed a letter supporting Harris's position. At the November AGM, two motions were unsuccessfully tabled: a motion of no confidence against Harris and another in favour of reviewing the society's stance on free speech. These were comprehensively defeated in the vote by members but some prominent members resigned, including management committee member Tim Tate who expressed concerns of bullying and improper process over the internal handling of complaints around the issue.

In 2024, the society campaigned for sustainability in publishing and for the acknowledgement of celebrity ghost writers.

In May 2024, members of the SoA called an emergency general meeting to discuss resolutions on ending fossil fuel finance in the books industry, the issue of artificial intelligence, and an SoA statement on the war in Gaza. The meeting voted to support the AI and fossil finance motions, but voted narrowly against the Gaza statement resolution, with the opposing speakers regarding it as "one-sided" and not appropriate for the society. Some members, including writer Sunny Singh, resigned over this outcome.

== Literary estates ==
The society administers the literary estates of 58 authors (as of 2024), and the income from this supports its work. These authors include George Bernard Shaw, Virginia Woolf, Philip Larkin and Rosamond Lehmann.

== Legacy ==
In 1969, the British Library acquired the archive of the Society of Authors from 1879 to 1968 consisting of six hundred and ninety volumes. The British Library acquired a further two hundred and fifty-eight volumes in 1982 and 1984.

== Awards and prizes ==
Prizes for fiction, poetry, and non-fiction administered by the SoA include:

- The Betty Trask Prize and Awards
- The Cholmondeley Award
- The Elizabeth Longford Prize for Historical Biography
- The Eric Gregory Award
- The Imison Award
- The Tinniswood Award
- The McKitterick Prize
- The Paul Torday Memorial Prize, for debut novelists over 60
- The Somerset Maugham Award
- The Sunday Times Young Writer of the Year Award
- The ALCS Tom-Gallon Trust Award
- The Travelling Scholarships
- The Queen's Knickers Award
- The Gordon Bowker Volcano Prize for a novel focusing on travel

The organisation also administers a number of literary translation prizes, including:

- The TA First Translation Prize, for translation from any language (annual)
- The Goethe-Institut Award, for German Translation (biennial)
- The John Florio Prize, for Italian Translation (biennial)
- The Banipal Prize, or The Saif Ghobash Banipal Prize for Arabic Translation (annual)
- The Scott Moncrieff Prize, for French Translation (annual)
- The Schlegel-Tieck Prize, for German Translation (annual)
- The Bernard Shaw Prize, for Swedish Translation (triennial)
- The Vondel Prize, for Dutch Translation (biennial)
- The Premio Valle Inclan, for Spanish Translation (annual)
- The TLS-Risa Domb/Porjes Prize, for Hebrew translation (triennial)
- The Great British Sasakawa Foundation Prize for translation from Japanese (since 2024)
- The TA First Translation Prize for debut translation from any language published in the UK

It has previously administered the following prizes:

- The Sunday Times EFG Short Story Award
- Calouste Gulbenkian Prize, for Portuguese Translation (triennial) Awarded for the last time in 2012
- The Women's Prize for Fiction

== See also ==
- Writers' Guild of Great Britain
- Authors' Licensing and Collecting Society
