= Matt Wesolowski =

British author

- In a 2023 interview
- Born: 24 August 1981 (age 45); Newscastle-Upon-Tyne, UK
- Occupation: Author
- Children: 1
- Writing career
- Period: 2016-present
- Genres: Horror; fantasy; supernatural fiction; crime fiction

Matt Wesolowski (born 1981) is a British author, who also teaches creative writing. He writes horror novels, his work explores supernatural, crime and fantasy genres. Wesolowski is best known for his horror fiction series Six Stories, first published in 2016.

== Early life and career ==
Matt Wesolowski was born on 24 August 1981 in Newcastle-upon-Tyne. His grandfather was from Poland and escaped to North East England as a prisoner of war during the Second World War. Wesolowski grew up in the Newcastle suburb of Gosforth and he describes himself as a goth. He struggled at school but he enjoyed reading as an escape from his anxiety around socialising.

When he left school, Wesolowski became an apprentice chef, before then going to university to study linguistics. Before writing full-time, he worked as an English tutor for young people in the Pupil Referral Unit (PRU) and care systems. He is a creative writing tutor for Faber Academy run by Faber and Faber publishing.

== Work ==
Matt Wesolowski's first published work were short stories featured in a number of different anthology books. In 2011, he published the short story "North" in the book Midnight Movie Creature Feature by May December Publications. In 2015, his short stories were published in a number of books; "Life is Precious" was published by Parallel Universe Publications in the book Kitchen Sink Gothic, "Trollkyrka" was published in Dimension6: annual collection, "Ellie Hill" was published in Onyx Neon Shorts Presents: Horror Collection - 2015, "Rockets" in Play Things & Past Times by KnightWatch Press, and a story in Northern Crime One: New Crime Stories from Northern Writers was published by Moth Publishing.

His debut novella was The Black Land published by Blood Bound Books in 2013.

=== Six Stories series ===
Six Stories was published by Orenda Books in 2016, about elusive journalist Scott King who creates a podcast about the unsolved murder of a teenager in Northern England. Reviews for Six Stories were mostly positive. Doug Johnstone wrote for The Big Issue that "Wesolowski evokes the ominous landscape and eerie atmosphere with sharp, direct prose." Six Stories was followed by Hydra (2017), Changeling (2018), Beast (2018), Deity (2020), and Demon (2021). Each book in the series is written as a new series in the fictional true-crime investigation podcast "Six Stories" by Scott King. In a review by Sublime Horror, Deity is described as the "most gripping and thought-provoking yet."

== Accolades ==
Matt Wesolowski won the Pitch Perfect competition at Bloody Scotland Crime Writing Festival in 2015. For his novel Changeling he was shortlisted for the Theakston Old Peculiar Crime Novel of the Year in 2019 and the 2019 Amazon Publishing Readers' Award for Best Thriller and Best Independent Voice. His novel Beast won the Amazon Publishing Award for Best Independent Voice in 2020.

== Personal life ==
Matt Wesolowski lives in Newcastle-upon-Tyne with his fiancé and son.

== Bibliography ==
Novels by Wesolowski
Year	Title	Publisher	Pages	Notes
2013	The Black Land	Blood Bound Books	144	
2016	Six Stories	Orenda Books	225	Six Stories Book 1
2017	Hydra	Orenda Books	258	Six Stories Book 2
2018	Changeling	Orenda Books	252	Six Stories Book 3
2019	Beast	Orenda Books	242	Six Stories Book 4
2020	Deity	Orenda Books	320	Six Stories Book 5
2021	Demon	Orenda Books	276	Six Stories Book 6
2025	(Don't) Call Mum	Wild Hunt Books	93	Part of the Northern Weird Project
