= Into a Raging Blaze =

2013 novel by Andreas Norman

Into A Raging Blaze
- First edition
- Author: Andreas Norman
- Original title: En rasande eld
- Translator: Ian Giles
- Language: Swedish
- Genre: Crime novel
- Publisher: Bonniers (Swedish); Quercus (English)
- Publication date: 2013
- Publication place: Sweden
- English publication date: 3 July 2014
- Media type: Print (Hardcover)
- Pages: 486 pp (Swedish); 528 pp (English)
- ISBN: 9789100132170 (Swedish); ISBN 9781782066033 (English)

Into A Raging Blaze (Swedish: En rasande eld) is a political thriller by Swedish author Andreas Norman, first published in Swedish in 2013. The novel was translated into English by Ian Giles and published in 2014 by Quercus. It received generally positive reviews, and was nominated for the CWA International Dagger in 2015.

The title refers to Ibn Arabi's poem 18 from The Translation of Desires.
