= Andreas Norman =

Swedish writer

- Born: Jakob Andreas Norman; 23 October 1972 (age 53); Farsta, Stockholm, Sweden
- Occupation: Writer

Jakob "Andreas" Norman, (born 23 October 1972 in Farsta in Stockholm), is a Swedish writer.

Norman is the son of psychoanalyst Johan Norman and social anthropologist Karin Norman, as well as being the grandson of lecturer Nils Norman and diplomat Kjell Öberg. He holds a pol. mag. degree and worked for the Ministry for Foreign Affairs (Sweden) between 2003 and 2013. His experiences and counter-terrorism work have particularly influenced his writing. Following the 2004 tsunami, Norman was sent to Thailand, where he participated in the crisis management in the aftermath.

Norman made his literary debut with a collection of poems in 1996. In 2013, his first novel, titled "En rasande eld" was published in Swedish. The book was published by Quercus in an English translation, Into A Raging Blaze, by Ian Giles in 2014. The plot follows protagonists Carina Dymek, a young civil servant at the Ministry of Foreign Affairs who is suspended following suspicions that she is collaborating with a terrorist network, and Bente Jensen, a veteran in the Swedish Security Service's counter-terrorism division. The book depicts the contemporary trends of global surveillance, the fight against terror and the tough international game being played by various intelligence services against each other. "Into A Raging Blaze" is the first part of a planned trilogy.

In 2015, it was announced that "Into A Raging Blaze" had been shortlisted by The Crime Writers' Association for the CWA International Dagger.

9,3 på Richterskalan (9.3 on the Richter Scale) is an eyewitness account of the crisis management that took place in Thailand and Stockholm after the 2004 tsunami. The book came out in October 2014 and was dramatised during the autumn of 2014 as a monologue. The play premièred at Malmö City Theatre 2015 and was directed by Sara Cronberg.

Into A Raging Blaze is being made into a film in Sweden by the Tre Vänner production company, with the screenplay being written by Oskar Söderlund. The film is expected to première in the spring of 2016.

== Bibliography ==
- De Otrogna (Albert Bonniers Förlag, 2017)
- 9,3 på Richterskalan (9,3 on the Richter scale) (Albert Bonniers förlag, 2014)
- Into A Raging Blaze (En rasande eld) (Quercus Books, 2014 and Albert Bonniers förlag, 2013)
- I dagarnas lutning (Tilting Days) (Albert Bonniers förlag, 1996)

== Other ==
Norman is the author of the study Generating Change: The OSCE and the Property Law Implementation in Bosnia and Herzegovina 1999–2002.
