= David F. Ross =

Scottish author and architect

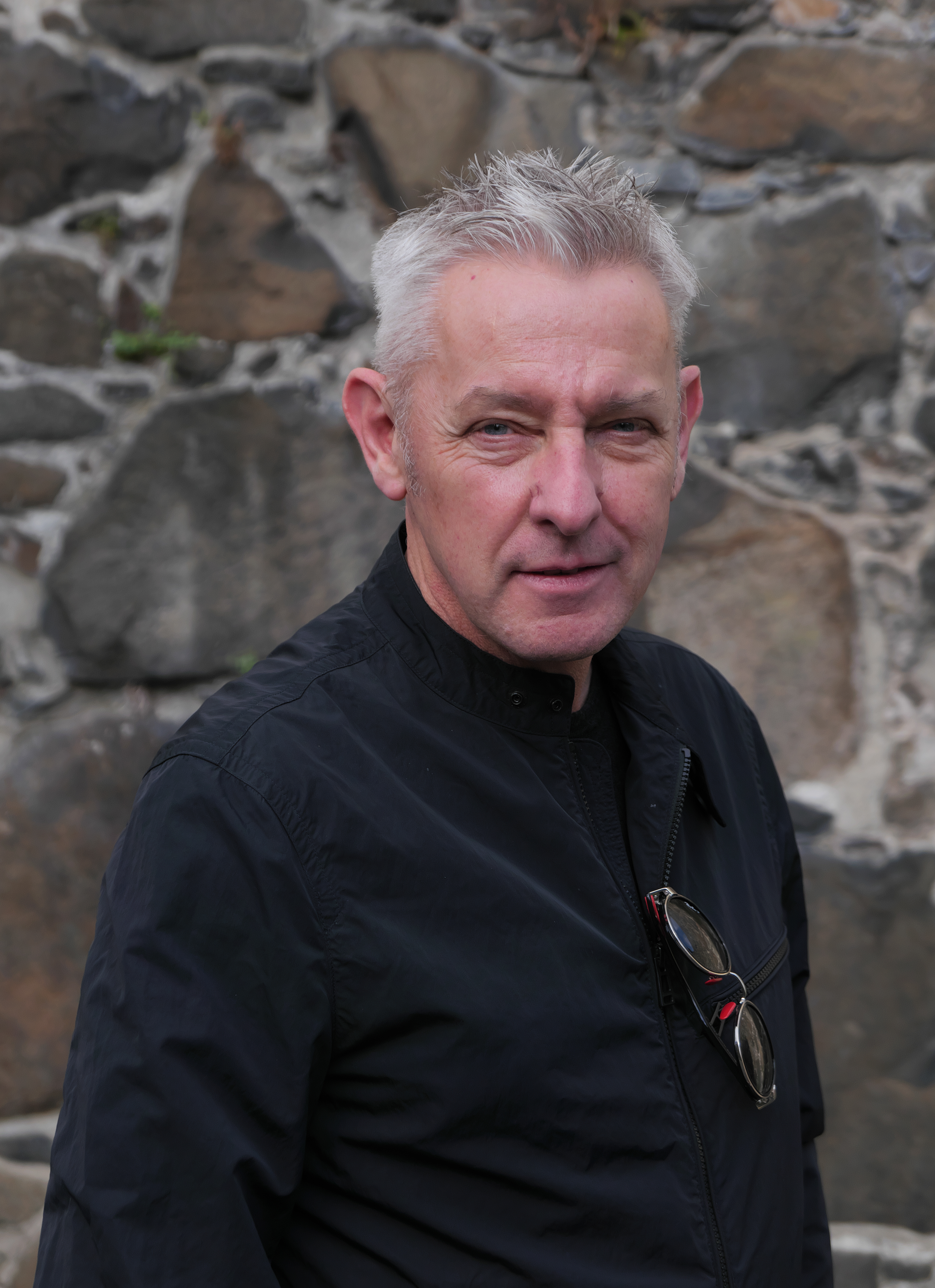
- Ross in 2025
- Born: Glasgow, Scotland
- Education: Mackintosh School of Architecture
- Occupations: Writer, Architect

David F. Ross (born 1964 in Glasgow) is a Scottish author and architect. He is the author of seven novels. His debut novel, The Last Days of Disco was long-listed for the Best First Novel Award by the Authors' Club of London. The National Theatre of Scotland acquired dramatic rights for the book in 2015.

Ross graduated from the Mackintosh School of Architecture at Glasgow School of Art. He has lived in Kilmarnock for over 30 years.

In 2019, he received a fellowship from the West College Scotland.

There's Only One Danny Garvey was shortlisted for the 2021 Saltire Society Literary's Scottish Fiction Book of the Year.

== Publications ==
=== Disco Days trilogy ===
1. The Last Days of Disco. Orenda Books. 2015. ISBN 9781910633021.
2. The Rise and Fall of the Miraculous Vespas. Orenda Books. 2015. ISBN 9781910633373.
3. The Man Who Loved Islands. Orenda Books. 2017. ISBN 9781910633151.

=== Standalone novels ===
- The Ballad of Boaby Souness: A Twitter Odyssey. 2014.
- Welcome to the Heady Heights. Orenda Books. 2019. ISBN 9781912374625.
- There's Only One Danny Garvey. Orenda Books. 2020. ISBN 9781913193508.
- Dashboard Elvis is Dead. Orenda Books. 2023. ISBN 9781914585401.
- The Weekenders. Orenda Books. 2025. ISBN 9781916788305.
