= Karin Alvtegen =

Swedish author of crime fiction (born 1965)

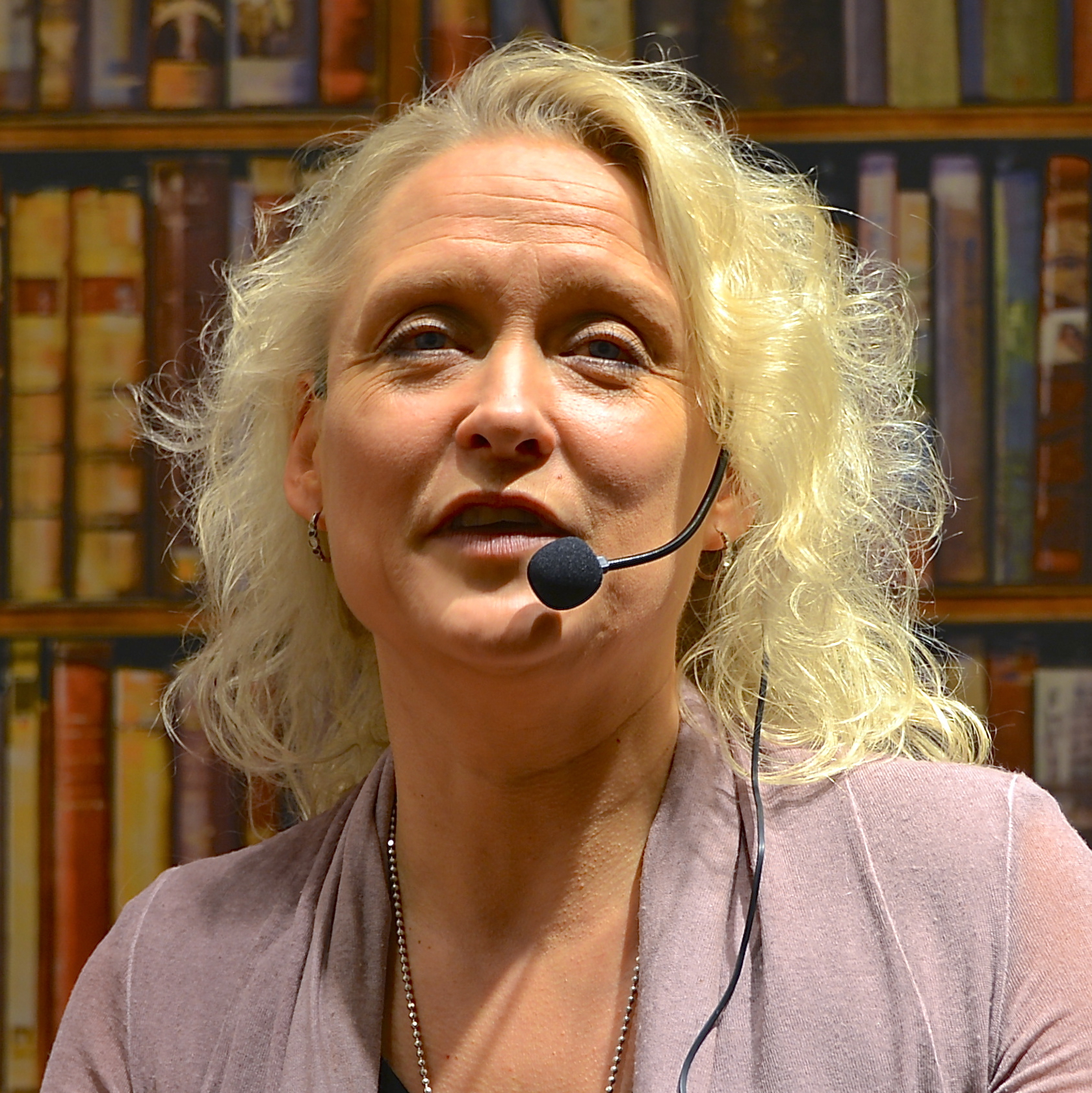
- Karin Alvtegen (2013)
- Born: 8 June 1965 (age 61); Huskvarna, Sweden
- Occupations: Journalist, writer
- Writing career
- Language: Swedish
- Period: 1998–
- Notable awards: Edgar Award, Glass Key award

Karin Alvtegen (born 8 June 1965, Huskvarna, Sweden) is a Swedish author of crime fiction. Alvtegen's psychological thrillers are generally set in Sweden. Four of her books have been translated into English: Missing, Betrayal, Shadow and Shame.

== Life and career ==
Alvtegen's second novel, Missing, was awarded the premier Nordic crime writing prize the Glass Key award in 2001. Translated in 2003 and published in the United States in 2009, the novel was nominated for the 2009 Edgar Award for best novel by the Mystery Writers of America. In 2006, the novel was adapted into the television miniseries Missing, directed by Ian Madden and with Joanne Froggatt and Gregor Fisher.

Alvtegen's 2005 novel Shame was shortlisted for the Crime Writers' Association Duncan Lawrie International Dagger award for crime novels in translation upon publication in English.

Alvtegen has worked as a teleplay writer, having penned 24 episodes of the Swedish soap opera Rederiet.

In 2013, Alvtegen fell ill in what was later diagnosed as myalgic encephalomyelitis/chronic fatigue syndrome (ME/CFS), essentially preventing her from writing. In June 2019, Alvtegen announced that she would become an ambasssader for the Open Medicine Foundation, an organisation that funds research into ME/CFS.

Alvtegen is grandniece of the children's novelist Astrid Lindgren.

== Bibliography ==
=== Novels ===
- Guilt (translated by Anna Paterson) (2007) – Skuld (1998)
- Missing (translated by Anna Paterson) (2003) – Saknad (2000)
- Betrayal (translated by Steven T. Murray) (2005) – Svek (2003)
- Shame/Sacrifice (translated by Steven T. Murray) (2006) – Skam (2005)
- Shadow (translated by Steven T. Murray) (2008) – Skugga (2007)
- A Probable Story (not yet published in English) – En Sannolik Historia (2010)
- Butterfly Effect (not yet published in English) – Fjärilseffekten (2013)

Note: in 2011 Shame was reissued in the UK with the title Sacrifice.

=== Screenplay ===
- 2004 – Hotet ("The Threat")
