= Ernesto Mallo =

Argentine writer (born 1948)

- Born: 1948 (age 77–78) La Plata, Buenos Aires Province, Argentina
- Occupation: Writer

Ernesto Mallo (born 1948) is an Argentine writer.

== Earky life and career ==
He was born in La Plata in the province of Buenos Aires.

Mallo has published in a wide variety of genres including stage plays, cinema scripts, essays and short stories. However, he is best known for his novels, the first of which (La aguja en el pajar) appeared in 2006. Since then, he has published several more novels.

Two of his books in the "Inspector Lascano" series have been translated into English: Needle in a Haystack, translated by Jethro Soutar, and Sweet Money, translated by Katherine Silver.

== Play scripts ==
- La vacuna (1973)
- Siete cuadros (1977)
- Qué mambo el de Colón (1982)

== Movie scripts ==
- La aguja en el pajar (2007)
- Maidana con todo (2007) (en colaboración con Juan Desanzo)
- Delincuente argentino (2007)

== Television scripts ==
- Imperio Chico (2012)
- Será Justicia (2014)

== Short stories ==
- Bautizo y otros cuentos (Eudeba, 1974)

== Anthologies ==
- Buenos Aires Noir (inglés), Akashic Books, New York, 2017.
- Barcelona Negra, Ediciones Siruela, Madrid, 2016.
- Madrid Negro, Ediciones Siruela, Madrid, 2016.
- Tiempos Negros, Ediciones Siruela, Madrid, 2017.
- Buenos Aires Noir, Akashic Books, New York, 2017.
- Músicas Negras, Ediciones Siruela, Madrid, 2017.

== Non-fiction ==
- Ferrum Cien Años, Editorial Franz Viegener, Buenos Aires, 2011.
- Buenos Aires Street Art, La Marca Editora, Buenos Aires, 2011.

== Novels ==
- La aguja en el pajar, Editorial Planeta, Buenos Aires 2006.
- Delincuente argentino, Editorial Planeta, Buenos Aires, 2007.
- L'aiguille dans la botte de foin, Payot & Rivages, Paris, 2009.
- El Relicario, Editorial Planeta, Buenos Aires, 2010.
- Der tote von der Plaza Once, Aufbau Verlag, Berlín, 2010.
- Needle in a haystack, Bitter Lemon Press, Londres, 2010.
- Der barfüBige polizist von der calle San Martín, Aufbau Verlag, Berlín, 2010.
- Crimen en el Barrio del Once, Ediciones Siruela, Buenos Aires, 2011.
- El Policía Descalzo de la Plaza San Martín, Ediciones Siruela, Madrid, 2011.
- Los Hombres te han hecho mal, Editorial Planeta, Buenos Aires, 2012.
- Los Hombres te han hecho mal, Ediciones Siruela, Madrid, 2012.
- El Comisario Lascano, Ediciones Siruela, Madrid, 2014.
- La Conspiración de los Mediocres, Ediciones Siruela, Madrid, 2015.
- La Conspiración de los mediocres, Penguin, Random House, Mondadori, Buenos Aires, 2015.
- El Hilo de Sangre, Ediciones Siruela, Madrid, 2018.
