= Peter Millar (journalist) =

British journalist and writer (1955–2023)

- Born: 22 February 1955; Bangor, County Down, Northern Ireland
- Died: 21 January 2023 (aged 67)
- Education: University of Oxford
- Occupations: Author, journalist
- Writing career
- Notable works: Tomorrow Belongs to Me; 1989: The Berlin Wall, My Part in its Downfall; All Gone to Look for America
- Website: petermillar.eu

Peter Millar (22 February 1955 – 21 January 2023) was a Northern Irish journalist, critic and author, primarily known for his reporting of the later days of the Cold War and fall of the Berlin Wall.

== Early life ==
Millar was born in Bangor, Co Down and educated at Bangor Central Primary School and Bangor Grammar School, then Magdalen College, Oxford, where he read French and Russian.

== Career ==
"I had committed the mistake of assuming that politics and logic would fuel the progress of history, instead of more potent factors: emotion and accident"
– Millar recounting in his book 1989: The Berlin Wall, My Part in its Downfall the reasons he saw for the fall of the Berlin Wall.

Millar was hired by Reuters in 1976 and worked in London and Brussels before being sent from Fleet Street to East Berlin by the news agency, where in the early 1980s he was the only non-German correspondent. Millar also reported on the Solidarity movement in Poland before moving to Warsaw and then Moscow. He joined The Daily Telegraph before in 1985 moving to the Sunday Telegraph, whose editor Peregrine Worsthorne agreed to Millar's suggestion to give him the role of Central Europe Correspondent: "I persuaded him to let me style myself Central Europe Correspondent, thereby not just inventing a job but revitalising a term – Central Europe – that had been current for centuries but dormant since the onset of the Cold War and the continent's split down an ideological fault line". In 1989, in the run-up to the final stages of The Cold War, Millar moved to The Sunday Times. He was arrested in East Berlin during demonstrations during Soviet leader Mikhail Gorbachev's visit for East Germany's 40th anniversary parades, and was interrogated by the Stasi before being expelled from East Germany. Two weeks later Millar returned to Berlin, however, to witness and report on the fall of the Berlin Wall, and the collapse of communism across Eastern Europe. One passage Millar wrote for a Sunday Times article, about events as they unfolded in Prague,

A hands-across-Prague protest designed as a human chain became instead a merry dance, a living tableau from a Breughel painting, as laughing, skipping people in warm mufflers and long scarves formed an endless twisting snake through the trees, through the snowy park, up to the floodlit spires, the castle itself and the archbishop's palace, then helter-skelter slithered giggling down steep, slippery, narrow cobbled streets and holding hands with an exaggerated formality, like a pastiche mazurka, passed across the fifteenth-century Charles Bridge, watched by all the statues of all the saints, and on to Wenceslas Square"

was subsequently quoted in its entirety in Martin Gilbert's A History of the Twentieth Century.

== Personal life and death ==
Millar died from a stroke on 21 January 2023, at the age of 67.

== Publications ==
- Tomorrow Belongs to Me, a history of modern Germany, from the fall of Danzig to the fall of the Berlin Wall, told through the eyes of a Berlin pub landlord
- Stealing Thunder, a thriller
- Bleak Midwinter, a thriller based on an outbreak of bubonic plague in modern Oxford
- 1989: The Berlin Wall, My Part in its Downfall (Arcadia Books, 2009), a memoir which covers events in Millar's career up to 1989. The Spectator described the book as "a witty, wry, elegiac account of his time as a Reuters and Sunday Times correspondent in Berlin throughout most of the 1980s ... Millar's great strength as a reporter is that he mixed with a wide range of ordinary East Germans, drinking Pilsner with them in bars, going for country walks and visiting their homes.".
- All Gone to Look for America (Riding the Iron Horse across a Continent and back) (2009), an account of a month spent criss-crossing the United States by railway. The book was described by The Daily Telegraph as "for those who love trains, microbrewery beer and the promise of big skies and wide open spaces. Millar's is the kind of journey a lot of mortgage-shackled, middle-aged men dream of: solitary, mildly liberating, comfortable but not too comfortable, adventurous but safely so”.
- The Black Madonna (Arcadia Books, 2010), a thriller
- The Shameful Suicide of Winston Churchill (2011), an alternate history thriller which relocates the Berlin Wall to London, imagining a continuation of World War II which ended in Soviet invasion of the southern UK
- Slow Train to Guantanamo (Arcadia Books, 2013), an account of travelling the length of Cuba by its antiquated railway system as the country begins to undergo changes
- Marrakech Express (Arcadia Books, 2014), a return to Morocco to find effects of the Arab Spring

Millar translated several German language books into English, including the White Masai series by Corinne Hofmann and Deal With the Devil by Martin Suter. He was also the translator of several online books published by Lübbe AG of Cologne, Germany, including Apokalypsis by Mario Giordano.

== Awards ==
- 1989 BBC What the Papers Say Foreign Correspondent of the Year

== Bibliography ==
- Millar, Peter (2009). 1989 The Berlin Wall: My Part in Its Downfall. Arcadia Books. ISBN 978-1-906413-47-7.
- Millar, Peter (2010). All Gone to Look for America. Arcadia Books Limited. ISBN 978-1-906413-63-7.
- Millar, Peter (2010). The Black Madonna. Arcadia Books. ISBN 978-1-906413-93-4.
- Millar, Peter (2011). The Shameful Suicide of Winston Churchill. Arcadia Books. ISBN 978-1-906413-85-9.
- Millar, Peter (2013). Slow Train to Guantánamo. Arcadia Books. ISBN 978-1-908129-50-5.
- Millar, Peter (2017). The Germans and Europe: A Personal Frontline History. Arcadia Books. ISBN 978-1-91135-058-3.
- Millar, Peter (2014). Marrakech Express (On and Off the Rails in the Sultans' Kingdom). Arcadia Books. ISBN 978-1-909807-59-4.
