= Special register body =

In the United Kingdom, a Special register body is an organisation whose name appeared in the special register maintained under section 84 of the Industrial Relations Act 1971 immediately before 16 September 1974, and which is a company registered under the Companies Act 1985 or is incorporated by charter or letters patent.

Special register bodies benefit from exceptions in, and adaptation of, certain types of trade union and financial legislation (for example: the democratic requirement for trade unions to elect the Chairman and Secretary of their principal executive committee).

Examples include the British Dental Association and Royal College of Nursing.

== See also ==
- UK labour law
