= Domingo Villar =

Spanish crime writer (1971–2022)

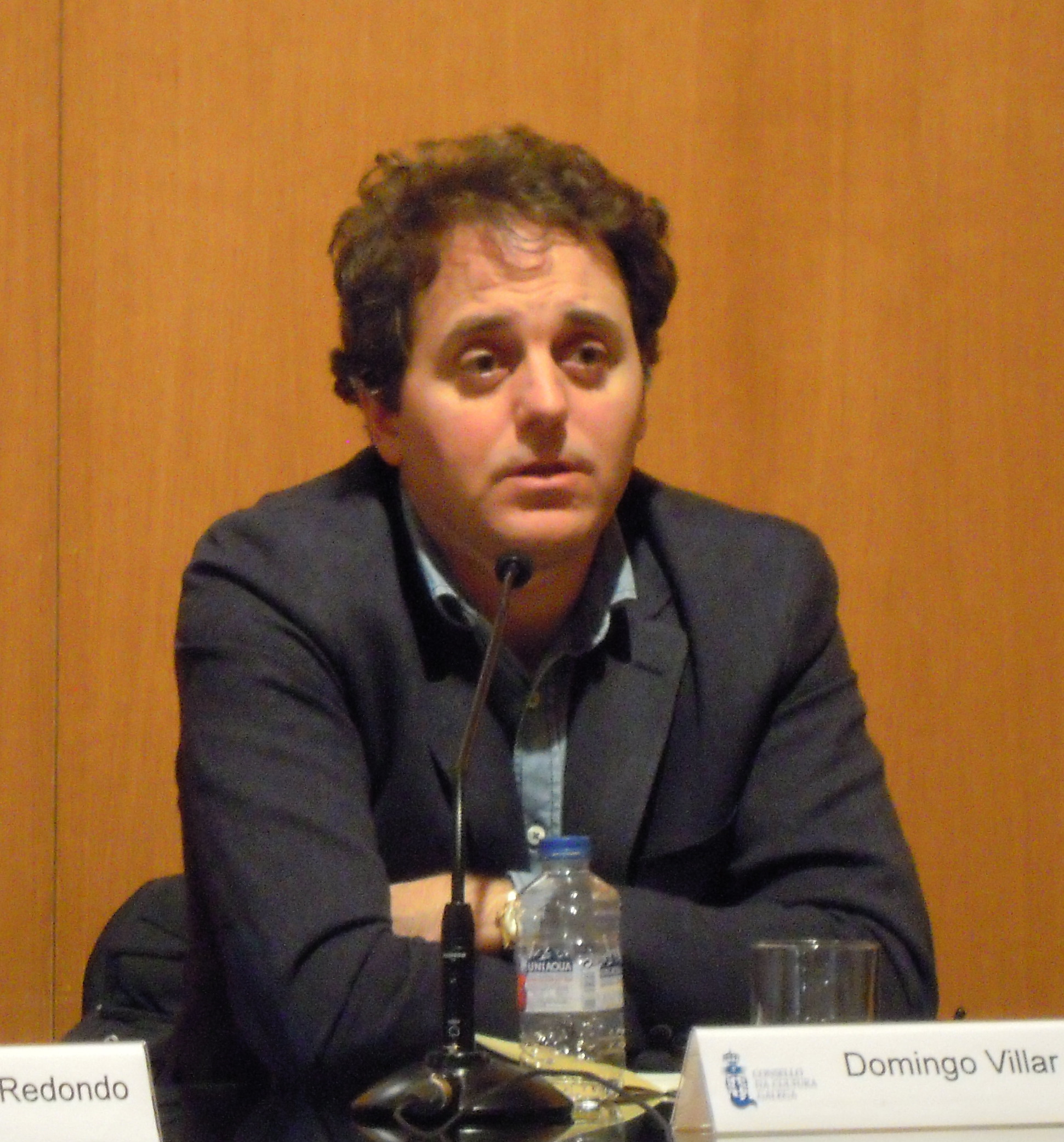
Domingo Villar in 2014

Domingo Villar (6 March 1971 – 18 May 2022) was a Galician crime writer.

== Biography ==
He was born and raised in Vigo, Galicia, Spain, and lived in Madrid. He published two novels featuring Inspector Leo Caldas, a dyed-in-the-wool Galician detective, and Rafael Estévez, his down to earth assistant from Zaragoza who finds it difficult to cope with the Galician sense of irony. Both novels were originally published in Galician before being translated into Spanish by the author himself. They have also been translated into several other European languages. Villar died in Vigo on 18 May 2022, at the age of 51, after suffering a stroke two days prior.

== Works ==
2006: Ojos de agua (Spanish)

- (Galician: Ollos de auga)
- (English : Water-blue eyes, tr. Martin Schifino)
- (German: Wasserblaue Augen, tr. Peter Kultzen)
- (Italian: Occhi di acqua, tr. S. Sichel)
- (Swedish: Nattens mörka toner: Ett fall för kommissarie Leo Caldas, tr. Lena E. Heyman)

2009: La playa de los ahogados

- (Galician: A praia dos afogados)
- (English: Death on a Galician Shore, tr. Sonia Soto)
- (German: Strand der Ertrunkenen, tr. Carsten Regling)
- (Swedish: De drunknades strand, tr. Lena E. Heyman)
- (French: La plage des noyés, tr. Dominique Lepreux)

La playa de los ahogados was brought to the screen in 2015 by the director Gerardo Herrero, based on a filmscript by the author.

== Prizes ==
- Premio Sintagma (2007)
- Premio Antón Losada Diéguez (2010)
- Libro del año por la Federación de Libreros de Galicia (2010)
- Premio Brigada 21 for best novel published in Spanish (2009)
- XXV Premio Nacional "Cultura viva" Narrativa (2016)
