= Jethro Soutar =

English writer and translator

Jethro Soutar is an English writer and translator, specializing mainly in Spanish and Portuguese literature.

== Selected works ==
Latin American culture (non-fiction):

- Ronaldinho: Football’s Flamboyant Maestro
- Gael García Bernal and the Latin American New Wave

Translations include:

- Needle in a Haystack by Ernesto Mallo (Argentina)
- Hotel Brasil by Frei Betto (Brazil)
- By Night the Mountain Burns by Juan Tomás Ávila Laurel (Equatorial Guinea)
- The Madwoman of Serrano by Dina Salústio (Cabo Verde)

He has also co-edited The Football Crónicas, a football-themed writing from Latin America. His work has appeared in Granta, the Guardian, the Independent and Words Without Borders.
