= Imogen Taylor =

British literary translator

Imogen Taylor is a British literary translator. She translates works from German to English, and has previously won the Goethe-Institut Prize for her work. Her notable translations include Sasha Marianna Salzmann's novel, Beside Myself, Melanie Raabe's The Trap, as well as Florian Huber's Promise Me You’ll Shoot Yourself: The Downfall of Ordinary Germans, 1945; and Sascha Arango's novel, The Truth and Other Lies. Her work has been shortlisted for the Schlegel-Tieck Prize and Helen and Kurt Wolff's Translator Prize.

== Biography ==
Taylor completed her undergraduate education at New College, Oxford where she studied French and German. She completed her doctorate at the Humboldt University, in Berlin, where she studied bilingual couples in 18th century French novels. She has lived in Berlin since 2001.

== Career ==
In 2015, Taylor published a translation of Sascha Arango's novel, The Truth and Other Lies (Die Wahrheit und andere Lügen). Her translation was listed as The New York Times' 100 Notable Books of 2015. In 2016, Taylor won the Goethe-Institut award for an excerpt of her translation Momente der Klarheit by Jackie Thomae (Hanser Berlin). In the same year, the Seattle Times's critic Adam Woog listed her translation of Melanie Raabe's The Trap as one of the 10 best mysteries of the year.

In 2018, The Guardian praised her "sure-footed" translation of Fear by Dirk Kurbjuweit (Orion) and listed it as one of the best books of 2018. The translation also earned praise from the Irish Times and Toronto Star.

In 2019, she published an English translation of German author and historian Florian Huber's best-selling account of mass suicides in Germany towards the end of World War II, titled Promise Me You’ll Shoot Yourself: The Downfall of Ordinary Germans, 1945. Taylor earned praise from the Financial Times, with reviewer Ruta Sepetys praising her "vivid translation", as well as from the Telegraph, which reviewed her "fine translation.".

In 2021, Taylor translated Sasha Marianna Salzmann's novel, Beside Myself, from German to English. The translation was received well, and was shortlisted for two major German-English translation awards: the Schlegel-Tieck Prize and the Helen and Kurt Wolff's Translator Prize.

== Awards ==
- 2016: Winner, Goethe-Institut Award for a translation of an extract from Momente der Klarheit by Jackie Thomae (Hanser Berlin)
- 2020: Shortlisted, Schlegel-Tieck Prize for a translation of Sasha Marianna Salzmann's Beside Myself
- 2021: Shortlisted, Helen and Kurt Wolff's Translator Prize for a translation of Sasha Marianna Salzmann's Beside Myself
- 2021: Longlisted, Dublin Literary Award 2020, for a translation of Sasha Marianna Salzmann's Beside Myself

== Bibliography ==
Translations from German to English:

- (2015) Sascha Arango, The truth and other lies (Melbourne : Text Publishing Company; Scoresby : Penguin Group Australia) ISBN 9-781-92218-2777
- (2016) Anja Reich-Osang, The Scholl case : the deadly end of a marriage (Melbourne, Vic. : Text Publishing) ISBN 9-781-92524-0931
- (2017) Dirk Kurbjuweit, Fear (Harper, New York) ISBN 9-780-06267-8348
- (2017) Melanie Raabe, The Trap (Melbourne, Victoria : Text Publishing Company) ISBN 9-781-92549-8042
- (2019) Melanie Raabe, The Shadow (Melbourne, Vic. : Text Publishing) ISBN 9-781-92226-8617
- (2019) Sasha Marianna Salzmann, Beside Myself (New York : Other Press) ISBN 9-781-89274-6443
- (2020) Florian Huber, Promise Me You’ll Shoot Yourself: The Downfall of Ordinary Germans, 1945 (Little, Brown Spark, New York) ISBN 9-780-31653-4307
- (2021) Dirk Kurbjuweit, The missing (Melbourne, Victoria : The Text Publishing Company) ISBN 9-781-92233-0444
