= Doug Johnstone =

Scottish writer

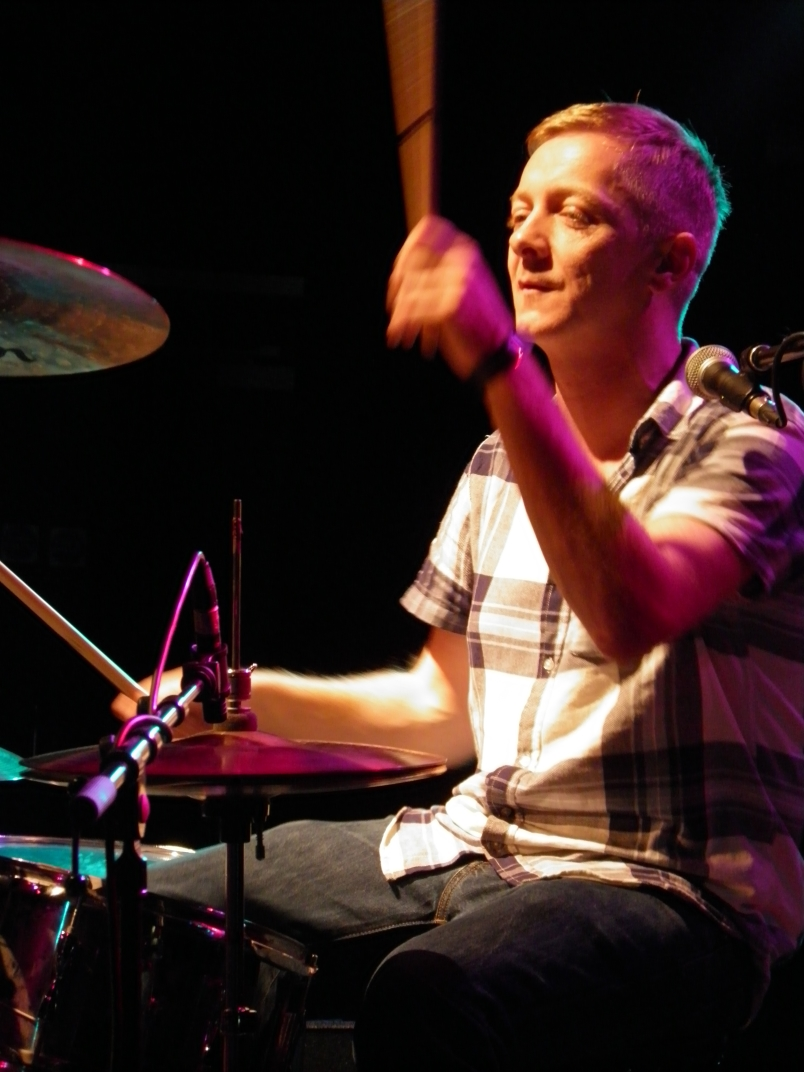
- Doug Johnstone playing drums with "Fun Lovin' Crime Writers" at Bloody Scotland International Crime Writing Festival, 2017
- Born: 22 July 1970 (age 54); Arbroath, Scotland
- Occupation: Writer

Doug Johnstone (born 22 July 1970) is a Scottish crime writer based in Edinburgh. His ninth novel Fault Lines was published by Orenda Books in May 2018. His 2015 book The Jump (published by Faber & Faber) was shortlisted for the McIlvanney Prize for Best Scottish Crime Novel.

He published two novels with Penguin, Tombstoning (2006) and The Ossians (2008), which received praise from Irvine Welsh, Ian Rankin and Christopher Brookmyre.

The Scotsman described him as "a master of the page-turning, heart-gripping, plot-driven tale."

Johnstone is a Royal Literary Fund Consultant Fellow and he was Royal Literary Fund Fellow at Edinburgh's Queen Margaret University from 2014–2016. He was a writer in residence at the University of Strathclyde from 2010-2012 and before that worked as a lecturer in creative writing. He has had several short stories appear in various publications, and since 1999 has worked as a freelance arts journalist, primarily covering music and literature. He is a singer, musician and songwriter in several bands, including Northern Alliance, part of the Fence Collective. Northern Alliance have released four albums, as well as recording an album as a fictional band called The Ossians, in parallel with Johnstone's 2008 novel of the same name. He has released two solo EPs - Keep It Afloat (including the autobiographical track I Used To Drum in a Rock'N'Roll Band), released in 2011, and 2014's I Did It Deliberately.

Johnstone has a degree in physics, a PhD in nuclear physics and a diploma in journalism. Before embarking on his literary career, he designed radar and missile guidance systems for military aircraft.

He grew up in Arbroath and lives in Portobello with his wife and two children.

Johnstone is also a co-founder of the Scotland Writers Football Club.

== Novels ==
- Tombstoning (2006)
- The Ossians (2008)
- Smokeheads (2011)
- Hit & Run (2012)
- Gone Again (2013)
- The Dead Beat (2014)
- The Jump (2015)
- Crash Land (2016)
- Fault Lines (2018)
- Breakers (2019)

=== Skelfs Series ===
- A Dark Matter (2019)
- The Big Chill (2020)
- The Great Silence (2021)
- Black Hearts (2022)
- The Opposite of Lonely (2023)
- Living is a Problem (2024)

=== Enceladons Trilogy ===
- The Space Between Us (2023)
- The Collapsing Wave (2024)
- The Transcendent Tide (2025)
