= Erika Fatland =

Norwegian writer (born 1983)

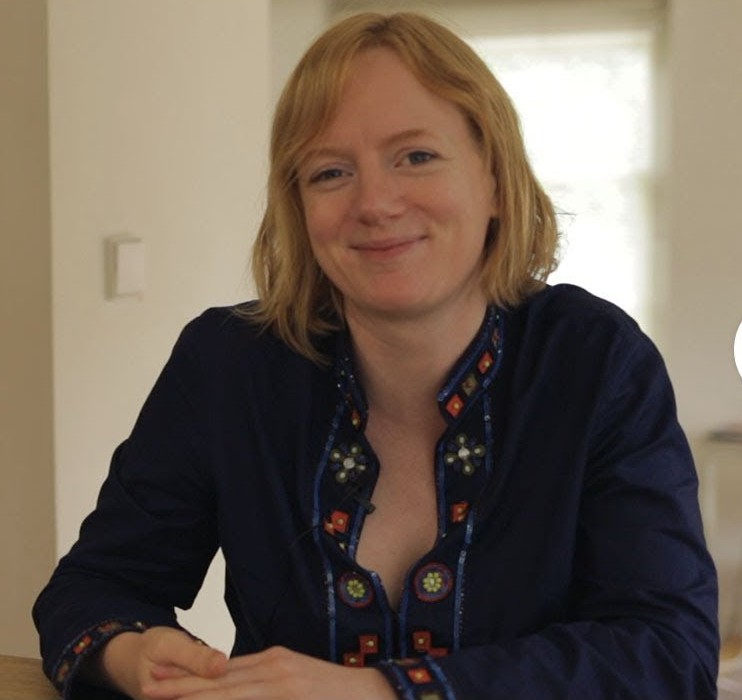
- Erika Fatland in 2019
- Born: 1983 (age 42–43); Haugesund, Rogaland, Norway
- Education: University of Oslo; University of Copenhagen
- Occupation: Writer
- Website: www.erikafatland.com

Erika Fatland (born 27 August 1983) is a Norwegian anthropologist, critic and writer. Her authorship focuses on travel writing and history. Fatland is the recipient of several awards for her writing and has been translated to twenty languages.

Fatland currently has a ten-year artist’s stipend from the Norwegian Government. She has written seven books.

== Early life and career ==
Fatland was born in Haugesund Municipality, Norway, in 1983, and read for an MPhil in anthropology at the University of Oslo.

Her first travel book, Sovietistan, published in 2015, was an account of her travels through five post-Soviet Central Asian nations, Kazakhstan, Tajikistan, Kyrgyzstan, Turkmenistan and Uzbekistan. It has been translated into 12 languages.

This was followed by The Border: A Journey Around Russia Through North Korea, China, Mongolia, Kazakhstan, Azerbaijan, Georgia, Ukraine, Belarus, Lithuania, Poland, Latvia, Estonia, Finland, Norway, and the Northeast Passage, an account of her travels around Russia's border, from North Korea to Norway. Both books have been translated into English by Kari Dickson, and both received critical acclaim from reviewers in the US and UK. The book was reviewed by The Washington Post.

She wrote two earlier books: The Village of Angels (2011) about the Beslan massacre and The Year Without a Summer about the Utøya massacre. She has also written the children's book The Parent War.

She has received numerous awards, among them the Norwegian Booksellers’ Prize for Nonfiction and the Wesselprisen (2016). She speaks eight languages including Norwegian, English, French, Russian, German, Italian, and Spanish. She lives in Oslo.

== Bibliography ==
- The Village of Angels (2011)
- The Year Without a Summer (2012)
- Sovietistan: Travels in Turkmenistan, Kazakhstan, Tajikistan, Kyrgyzstan, and Uzbekistan (2020)
- The Border: A Journey Around Russia Through North Korea, China, Mongolia, Kazakhstan, Azerbaijan, Georgia, Ukraine, Belarus, Lithuania, Poland, Latvia, Estonia, Finland, Norway, and the Northeast Passage (2021)
- High: A Journey Across the Himalaya, Through Pakistan, India, Bhutan, Nepal, and China (2023)
- The Navigators: A Journey in Search of Portugal's Lost Empire (2024)
- Ukraina: En vinterreise (2026)
