= Yun Ko-eun =

South Korean writer (born 1980)

Yun Ko-eun (Hangul: 윤고은; born 1980) is a South Korean writer and host of radio show "윤고은의 Book cafe," aired daily on EBS.

== Life ==
Yun Ko-eun was born in 1980 in Seoul, South Korea. She studied creative writing at Dongguk University, making her literary debut in 2004 when she won the 2nd Daesan Collegiate Literary Prize; in 2008, she won the 13th Hankyoreh Literary Award for her novel Mujungryeok jeunghugun (무중력증후군 The Zero G Syndrome). She has published three short story collections: Irinyong siktak (1인용 식탁 Table for One), Aloha (알로하 Aloha), and Neulgeun chawa hichihaikeo (늙은 차와 히치하이커 The Old Car and Hitchhiker).

Prior to her literary debut, she ran a blog on which she posted short travelogues or entries about her everyday life.

For several years following her graduation, Yun took on various jobs including tutoring, writing for an in-house periodical, and creating educational material for children––yet she did not write any fiction until forming a writer's club with old friends from Dongguk University. Two years later, she won the 13th Hankyoreh Literary Award with Mujungryeok jeunghugun. In 2016, she participated in the Overseas Translation Workshop Program held by MCST and LTI Korea at the National Institute for Oriental Languages and Civilizations (INALCO) in France.

== Writing ==
Literary critic Do Jeong-il and writers Hwang Sok-yong and Kim Insuk, who judged the Hankyoreh Literary Award and selected Mujungryeok jeunghugun as the winning work, critiqued that it, "figuratively and humorously depicts the sense of alienation people feel in today's society. The weight of their alienation is portrayed lightly, and the intensity of their pains cheerfully." In the novel, the moon splits into two, then four, and finally into six moons one day, like a planarian. The strange phenomenon plunges people on Earth into chaos, stoking their lunar fantasies, apocalyptic fears, or desire to earn profit from these moons. Yun says she conceived the idea of splitting and multiplying moons when she was at a convenience store purchasing a bun that looked like a full moon. Then she took the idea and expanded it into a novel "like the leavening of bread."

Literary critic Gang Ji-hui says "Yun Ko-eun seems to have earned a reputation for distorting reality with whimsical imagination." On Yun's narrative structure, Gang notes: "The characters in Yun Ko-eun's novels typically follow a curve that starts from zero, increases in entropy as some imaginative event unfolds, hits peak levels, and falls back down to zero."

Such characteristics are also evident in Yun's 2016 short story collection Neulgeun chawa hichihaikeo (늙은 차와 히치하이커 The Old Car and Hitchhiker). A review summarizes the collection as follows: "Yun Ko-eun's third short story collection Neulgeun chawa hichihaikeo consists of eight stories that bring readers to the boundaries between reality and imagination. Some of these stories tip the scales toward the side of imagination: "Y-ray" is about a 'y-ray' machine, a defective product manufactured in an x-ray machine factory, that goes on to diagnose certain individuals as potential dissidents who must be shunned from society; "Bultaneun jakpum" (불타는 작품 Burning Works of Art) involves a residency program that invites artists to create artwork over six months, exhibits their completed works once, then burns them up; "Daokjeong chilbeonji" (다옥정 7번지 Daokjeong Number 7) presumes that 1930s Korean writer Park Taewon comes back from the dead in 21st-century Seoul and guides tourists around the places in which his novel is set." (The novel mentioned here refers to Park Taewon's A Day in the Life of Kubo the Novelist). Despite their fantastical nature, Yun Ko-eun's stories do not lead readers to a state of actual zero gravity, but to an illusion of it, as the term "Zero G Syndrome" indicates. The illusion is born from the imagination and desires of people whose lives are firmly grounded in reality.

== Works ==
Short Story Collections

- 『늙은 차와 히치하이커』, 한겨레출판, 2016년. ISBN 9788984319837 { The Old Car and Hitchhiker. Hanibook, 2016. }
- 『알로하』, 창비, 2014년, ISBN 9788936437312 { Aloha. Changbi, 2014. }
- 『1인용 식탁』, 문학과지성사, 2010년, ISBN 9788932020495 { Table for One. Moonji, 2010. }

Novels

- 『밤의 여행자들』, 민음사, 2013년, ISBN 9788937473036 { Travelers of the Night. Minumsa, 2013. }
- 『무중력 증후군』, 윤고은, 한겨레출판, 2008년, ISBN 9788984312760 { The Zero G Syndrome. Hanibook, 2008. }

=== Works in translation ===
- Histoires insolites de Corée
- The Disaster Tourist

== Awards ==
- 2004: 2nd Daesan Collegiate Literary Prize for "Pieosing" (피어싱 Piercing)
- 2008: 13th Hankyoreh Literary Award for Mujungryeok jeunghugun (무중력증후군 The Zero G Syndrome)
- 2011: 12th Lee Hyo-seok Literary Award for "Haema, nalda" (해마, 날다 The Hippocampus Flies)
- 2015: Kim Yong Ik Literary Award for Aloha (알로하 Aloha)
- 2021: Dagger Award for The Disaster Tourist
