= Will Carver =

English fiction writer

William Carver
- Born: England
- Education: King Alfred's, Winchester
- Occupation: Novelist
- Writing career
- Genres: Crime, Mystery, Thriller, Black comedy, Horror

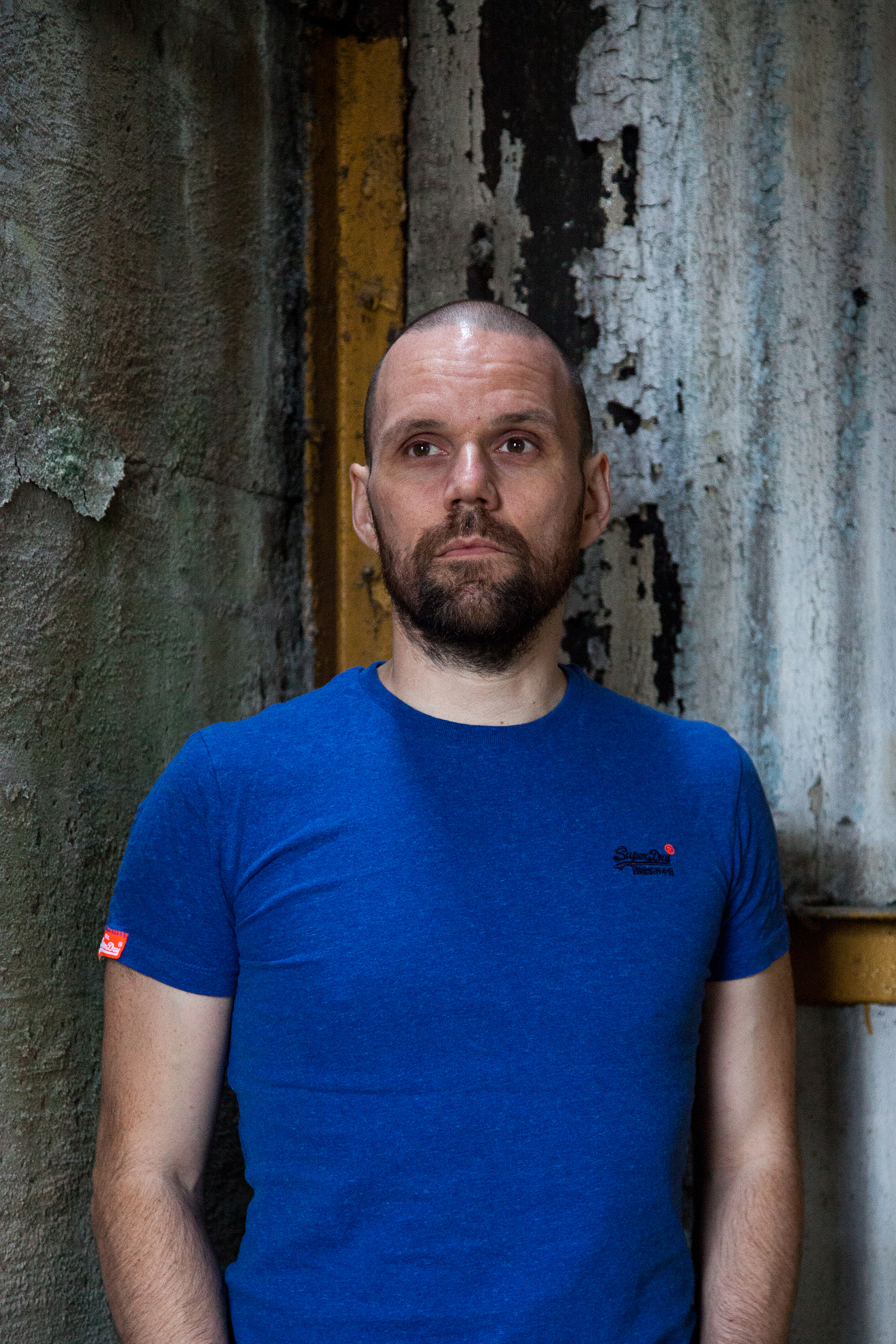
Will Carver (Newcastle Noir 2019)

William Carver is an English author whose works span the crime, mystery and thriller genres. He is best known for the Detective Inspector January David series, comprising Girl 4, The Two and Dead Set. He lives in Reading, Berkshire.

== Early life ==
Carver's early years were spent in Germany but at the age of 11 he returned to the UK, where his sporting career began to flourish. He turned down a professional rugby contract to study a Theatre and Television degree at King Alfred's, Winchester, where he also set up his own successful theatre company.

His first novel – a black comedy – was not taken up, one publisher suggested his writing style would suit a thriller. Six months later, Girl 4 was finished. Four months after that he was signed to Random House for three books. He is currently writing the fourth.

== Literary career ==
In 2009, he finished his debut novel – Girl 4 – which was published by Random House, with the book being released in May 2011. His second thriller novel, The Two, was published a year later with the third book in the January David series, Dead Set, following in 2013. (A digital novella was also published between the second and third book – The Killer Inside – and remains free to download.)

In 2018, Carver returned with the first book in the series featuring Detective Sergeant Pace, a dark, domestic noir, Good Samaritans, published by Orenda Books. It went on to become a book of the year in The Telegraph, The Guardian and The Express. It was also longlisted for the Not The Booker Prize and shortlisted for the inaugural Amazon Publishing Awards' Best Independent Voice.

Following the success of Good Samaritans, Carver released Nothing Important Happened Today, about an invisible suicide cult where nobody knows they are a member until it is too late. The novel was longlisted for the Goldboro Books Glass Bell Award as well as the prestigious Theakstons Old Peculiar Crime Novel Of The Year Award.

2020 saw the publication of Hinton Hollow Death Trip, the third book in the Detective Pace series, where the narrator of the story is Evil itself. In 2021, Carver was set to have two novels published. The first – The Beresford – a stand-alone novel that dips its toe into horror, and Psychopaths Anonymous, which forms part of the series while also standing on its own.

== Bibliography ==
=== Detective Inspector January David series ===
- Girl 4 (2011)
- The Two (2011)
- The Killer Inside (2013) (short story)
- Dead Set (2013)

=== Detective Sergeant Pace series ===
- Good Samaritans (2018)
- Nothing Important Happened Today (2019)
- Hinton Hollow Death Trip (2020)
- Psychopaths Anonymous (2021)

=== Standalone works ===
- The Beresford (2021)
- The Daves Next Door (2022)
- Suicide Thursday (2022)
- Upstairs at The Beresford (2023)
- Kill them with Kindness (2025
- Bad Influence (2026)
