= Death on a Galician Shore =

2009 novel by Domingo Villar

Cover of the 2012 Abacus reprint of the book

Death on a Galician Shore (A praia dos afogados) is a detective fiction novel by Domingo Villar published by Agencia Literaria in 2009. In 2011, the novel was published in Great Britain by Abacus and translated by Sonia Soto; that year it was shortlisted for the Crime Writers' Association's International Dagger Award. The movie "A praia dos afogados" directed by Gerardo Hererro is based on the book and was released in theaters in 2015.

== Plot ==
Police Investigator Leo Caldas of the Vigo Police Department has been called to the town of Panxon to check on a body of a sailor who has washed up on the northwest shore of Spain. The townspeople believe it to be a suicide, Caldas is not so sure. With help from forensic pathologists, it is determined to be murder. Who and why are the questions Caldas concerns himself with. While working on the death of the sailor, Caldas learns about a murder ten years ago that could be connected. Caldas is a character dealing with his own problems—the loss of his mother, the new life of his father, a sick uncle, and longing for a former girlfriend.

== Background ==
Domingo Villar (6 March 1971 – 18 May 2022), a Spanish crime writer, was born in Vigo, and lived in Madrid, Spain. This is Villar's second book featuring Inspector Leo Caldas. The first is "Water Blue Eyes" (Ojos de agua) published in 2006 and the following novel "The Last Boat" (El último barco) was published in 2019.

== Characters ==
- Inspector Leo Caldas—Vigo Police Investigator, main character
- Assistant Rafael Estevez—Vigo Policeman, Caldas' assistant
- Captain Sousa—Captain of a ship that sank ten years ago
- Marcos Valverde
- Irene Vazquez—Neighbor to Rebeca Naira
- Ernesto Hermia & Wife—Fisherman and wife, eyewitness to fisherman that is found dead
- Justo Castello—Sailor that is washed up on the shore
- Rebeca Naira—Woman killed ten years earlier
- Diego Naira—Son of Rebeca Naira

== Literary significance and reception ==
In this book, Villar tells the story of a close-knit town in the northwest of Spain, where fishermen return to the water Monday-Saturday to fill their nets and sell their catches. Food is also an important feature to the story. The culture of the people, including their food, plays an important role in the story.

In Maxine Scott's review of the book, she states that this is not a "complicated" book, and it was not necessary to have a multiple number of bodies to enhance the story.
