= Thomas Enger =

Norwegian writer and journalist

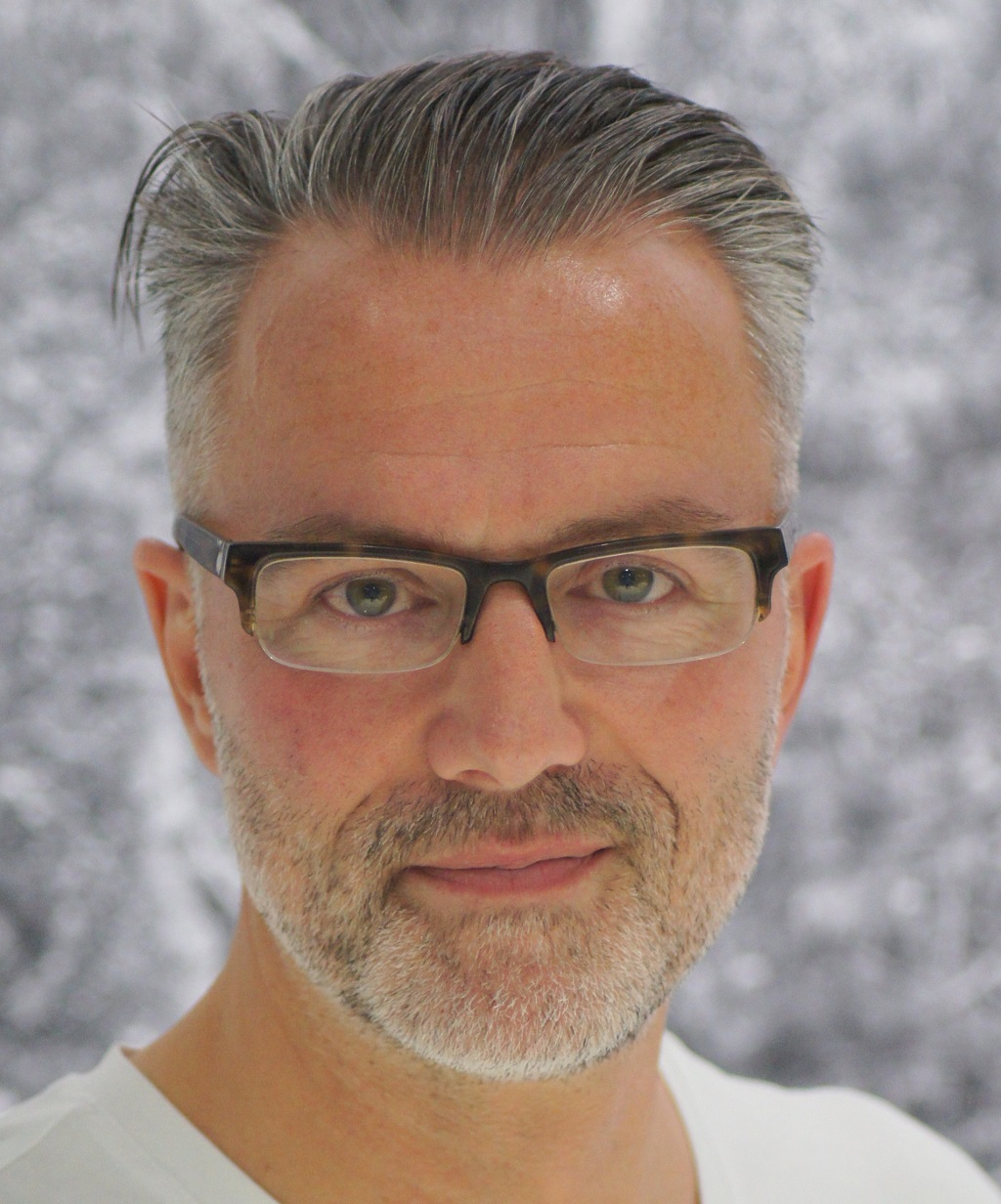
- Born: November 21, 1973 (age 52); Oslo, Norway
- Occupations: Writer; Journalist
- Writing career
- Genre: Fiction
- Subject: Crime

Thomas Enger (born November 21, 1973, in Oslo) is a Norwegian writer and journalist. He grew up in Jessheim, but is now living in Oslo with his cohabitant and two children. He is a trained journalist and worked for Nettavisen for nine years. Thomas Enger has also taken sports foundation studies and history of intermediate subjects. He also composes music.

He debuted with the book "Skinndød" in 2010. It was the first stand-alone book in a series of five books about the journalist Henning Juul. The series has since been sold to 30 countries and the book was nominated for eDunnit Award 2012 under CrimeFest 2012. He has won "uPrisen" twice, first in 2014 for The evil legacy, then in 2018 for "Killer instinkt".

== Novels ==
- Burned
- Pierced
- Scarred
- Cursed
- Killed
