= Daniella Zamir =

Israeli translator (born 1983)

Daniella Zamir (Hebrew: דניאלה זמיר; born 1983, in Israel) is an Israeli literary translator of contemporary fiction. In 2019, she won the CWA International Dagger for her translation of A Long Night in Paris by Dov Alfon. In 2023, she won the Sami Rohr Prize for Jewish Literature for her translation of Jerusalem Beach by Iddo Gefen. She obtained her bachelor's degree in literature from Tel Aviv University, and her master's degree in creative writing from City, University of London.

== Selected works ==
=== Translations ===
- How to Love Your Daughter by Hila Blum (2023)
- Jerusalem Beach by Iddo Gefen (2022)
- The Teacher by Michal Ben-Naftali (2020)
- The Others by Sarah Blau (2019)
- A Long Night in Paris by Dov Alfon (2019)

=== Short story translations ===
- Moving on from Grace by Hila Amit (2020)
- The Porn Shelter by Orian Morris (2018)
- Three Men in America by Julia Fermento (2017)
- Saragossa in Berlin by Iftach Alony (2015)
- How I Lost My Family in the Last Gaza War by Orian Morris (2015)

== Awards ==
- Sami Rohr Prize for Jewish Literature for translation of Jerusalem Beach by Iddo Gefen (2023)
- CWA International Dagger for translation of A Long Night in Paris by Dov Alfon (2019)
