= Yitzhak Yaakov Yellin =

Israeli journalist and writer (1885–1964)

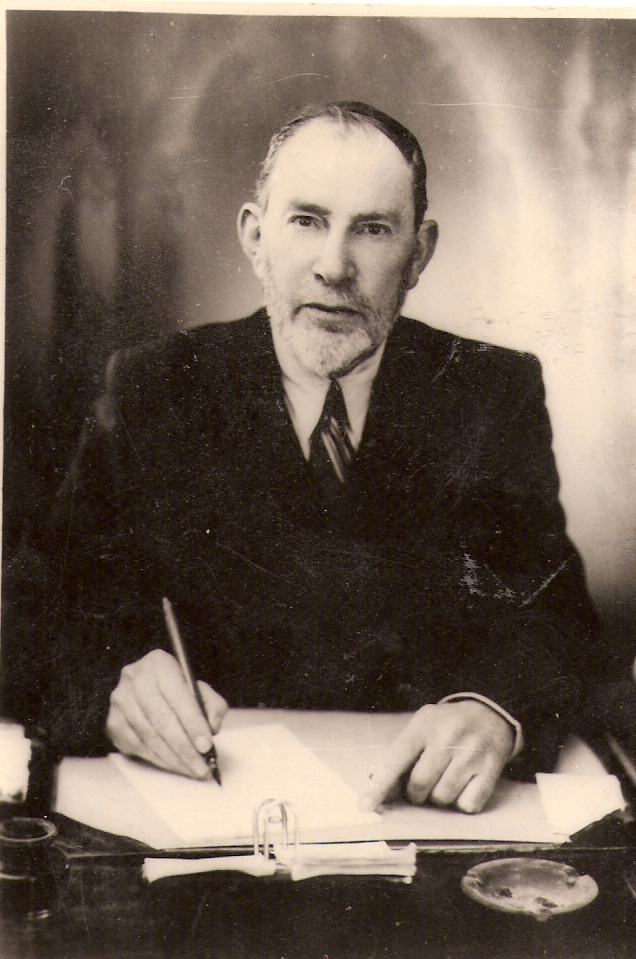
Yitzhak Yaakov Yellin at his desk, Jerusalem, Israel

Yitzchak Yaakov Yellin (Hebrew: יצחק יעקב ילין, Isaac Jacob Yellin; 1885–1964) was one of the pioneers of the Hebrew language and press in Mandatory Palestine and then Israel. He was one of the founders and editor of the daily newspaper "Moriah", as well as the editor of the weekly newspapers "Lefi Sha'a", "Be'inyaney Dyuma", and "Hed ha'am". Yellin published Hebrew grammar books and was known as an educational figure who widely contributed towards the spread and use of the Hebrew language in Jerusalem of the early 20th century. He was also one of the founders of the Kiryat Moshe neighborhood in West Jerusalem.

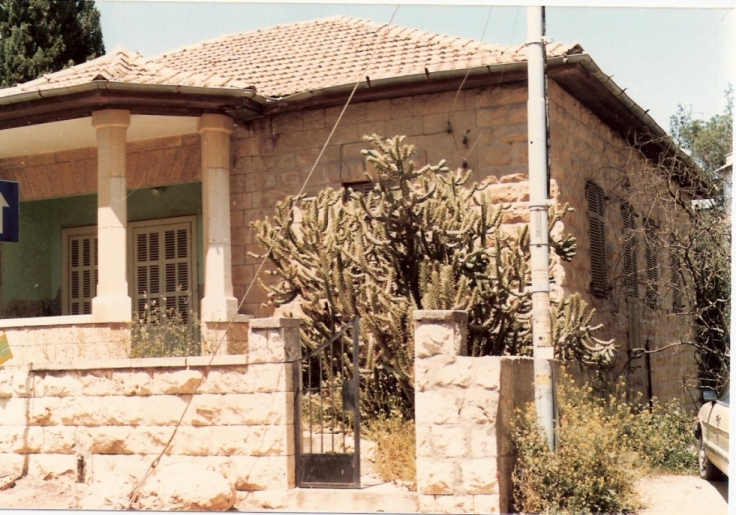
The Yellin House at Kiryat Moshe, Jerusalem.

== Biography ==
Yellin was born in the Old City of Jerusalem to a family of biblical grammarians. His grandfather, Rabbi Shalom Shachne Yellin, who was known as "The Proofreader of Skidl", was regarded as one of the proofreaders of the most popular Torah books in the world, and his name is connected to the notes and commentary of the Aleppo Codex (Keter Aram Zoba) of Ben Asher. His uncle, Aryeh Leib Yellin, most known as the author of the Yefeh 'Enayim parallel passages of the Talmudic text, was a Polish rabbi. His father, a proofreader and Torah scribe, known by the alias Zvi Hirsch Sofer, was one of the founders of the Mishkenot Yisrael neighborhood in Jerusalem.

Yitzchak Yaakov Yellin married Lea Miriam, the daughter of Rabbi Meshulam Zalman Shapira, the son of Rabbi Haim Yaakov Shapira, the head of the Rabbinical Law Court of Jerusalem.

Already at 17 years of age, Yellin began publishing a weekly newspaper that was called The Zionist, in which he called upon the spreading of the Zionist idea and its adaptation by the Jewish Ultra-Orthodox wing, which he himself was part of. In "The Zionist", which was distributed in yeshivas (Talmudic colleges) in Jerusalem, Yellin preached, among others, for Zionist achievements and the need of yeshiva students to join the work force.

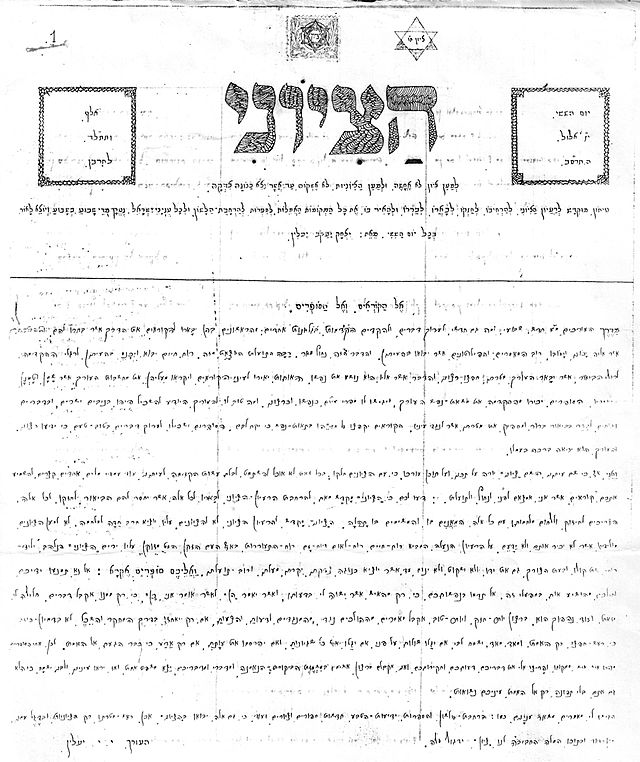
"The Zionist" weekly Newspaper published by Yitzhak Yaakov Yellin.

In 1910, with the establishment of the "Moriah" newspaper, Yellin was appointed as its chief editor and stayed in that role during all the years of the newspaper's life. During these years Yellin also wrote a substantial amount of the newspaper's articles. "Moriah" was closed in 1915, during World War I, under a decree of the Turkish authorities, after Yellin refused to follow the decree that forbade newspapers to write about political issues.

Among the other newspapers that Yellin wrote, edited and published, were "Lefi Sha'a", "Be'inyanei Dyuma", which were printed during World War I, as well as the weekly newspaper "Hed Ha'am", which was published in the years 1924 and 1925. In addition, Yellin was a member of the Daily Newspaper Do'ar HaYom, and later on he also wrote for the newspaper "Ha'aretz".

All of Yellin's literary and journalistic inheritance was donated to the Yad Ben-Zvi Museum in Jerusalem, and it can be found there at a corner that has been dedicated to Yellin's memory.

Yitzchak Yaakov Yellin also served for many years as a teacher of the Hebrew language, grammar and mathematics at the Yeshiva Etz Haim. Yellin was the first figure to initiate Hebrew lessons in Torah schools, and this despite the bitter objection of Ultra-orthodox Jews (until then it was custom to learn Hebrew translated to Yiddish).

Yellin wrote two grammar books for teaching Hebrew: ״The Punctuation Book" (1921) and "The Verbs Book" (1930). These books were distributed and used as the basis for teaching the Hebrew language in Torah schools and colleges. In addition, Yellin wrote and published a detailed book about grammar as an element in the Halakha (Jewish Law).

For all these achievements and his work for Jerusalem and its people, Yellin was presented with the "Ot HaRishonim" badge of the city of Jerusalem.

Yitzhak Yaakov Yellin died on Alef of Iyar, 1964, in the Jerusalem neighborhood of Kiryat Moshe, of which he was one of the founders. Until today, the neighborhood's synagogue, "Ohel Yitzhak" ("The Tent of Yitzhak"), where Yellin served as cantor and synagogue manager, and also a street in the neighborhood, are named after Yellin.

In 2007, Yitzhak Yakov's granddaughter, English author Tamar Yellin, won the Sami Rohr Prize, a Jewish literary prize, for her novel "The Genizah at the House of Shepher", a fictitious tale whose origin lies in the true tales of the Yellin family and on letters and documents found in the attic of Yitzhak Yakov Yellin's house in Jerusalem.

== Publications ==
- Yellin, Yitzchak Yaakov (1966). Avoteinu: History Chapters and Existence (in Hebrew). Jerusalem: Rabbi Kuk Institute.
- Yellin, Yitzchak Yaakov (1947). Achva Book (in Hebrew). Jerusalem: World Achva Union.
- Yellin, Yitzchak Yaakov (1973). The Grammar as an Element in Halacha (in Hebrew). Jerusalem: Rabbi Kuk Institute.
- Yellin, Yitzchak Yaakov (1921). The Hebrew Grammar – Punctuation (in Hebrew). Jerusalem: Harash Halevi Publishing.
- Yellin, Yitzchak Yaakov (1930). The Hebrew Grammar – Verbs (in Hebrew). Jerusalem: Y. Abaksis Publishing.
