= Jonathan Steinberg (historian) =

American historian (1934–2021)

- Born: 8 March 1934; New York City, U.S.
- Died: 4 March 2021 (aged 86); Cambridge, England, U.K.
- Education: Harvard University (B.A.); Cambridge University (Ph.D.)
- Occupation: Professor of European History

Jonathan Steinberg (8 March 1934 – 4 March 2021) was the Walter H. Annenberg Professor of European History Emeritus and Chair of the Department of History at the University of Pennsylvania.

== Career ==
Steinberg received his undergraduate degree from Harvard University and his PhD from Cambridge University. After serving for 33 years at Cambridge University as University Lecturer and then Reader in European History, Fellow of Trinity Hall, and Vice-Master, he taught at the University of Pennsylvania in Philadelphia.

He was an emeritus fellow of Trinity Hall, Cambridge, and served as an External Examiner in Part II of the Cambridge History Tripos for 2009 to 2011.

Steinberg's teaching covered modern Europe since 1789 with specialization in the German and Austrian Empires, Nazi Germany, Fascist Italy and modern Jewish history. He also taught graduate seminars in historical thought and method and taught economic thought from Adam Smith to Karl Marx.

== Publications ==
He is the author of Yesterday’s Deterrent: Tirpitz and the Birth of the German Battle Fleet (1965), Why Switzerland? (1976), All or Nothing: The Axis and the Holocaust, 1941–43 (2002), and Die Deutsche Bank und ihre Goldtransaktionen im Zweiten Weltkrieg (also published in English as `The Deutsche Bank and Its Gold Transactions During the Second World War' (1999)). His reviews have appeared in The London Review of Books, The Evening Standard, The Financial Times, and The Times Literary Supplement. In 2003 he completed European History and European Lives, 1715 to 1914, a 36-part series of biographies produced by The Teaching Company. Dr. Steinberg has also written many radio and TV documentaries, including BBC Radio Four's salute to the Constitution of the United States, Secure in Their Persons.

He was co-editor of The Historical Journal, Cambridge University Press, from 1990 to 2000. His biography of Otto Von Bismarck entitled Bismarck: A Life was published by Oxford University Press in 2011 and was short-listed for the BBC Samuel Johnson Prize for Non-Fiction in 2011 and short-listed for the Duff Cooper Prize in 2012. A German edition Bismarck. Magier der Macht was published by Propylaen Verlag, a subsidiary of Ullstein. In October 2012, a Danish edition published by Sohn and a Romanian edition published by Eikon appeared at the same time. A Japanese edition in two volumes appeared in 2012. A Brazilian edition (Bismarck - Uma Vida) appeared in 2015. A Russian and a Chinese edition are forthcoming. He has just completed a third and revised edition of Why Switzerland? which has been submitted to Cambridge University Press.

The biography of Bismarck was well received by scholars. Jonathan Sperber said it is, "Elegantly and forcefully written, with a thorough command of the scholarship on all the relevant aspects of nineteenth-century history and an equally thorough acquaintance with the printed sources." Robert M. Citino wrote, "Happily, Steinberg's book triumphs....no other biography reflects such a careful reading of the secondary literature. By now, mastery of the enormous Bismarck literature can only be the product of a lifetime of reading and reflection. The result is synthesis in the classic style." Abigail Green wrote, "Steinberg’s new biography of Bismarck has been widely acclaimed, and rightly so....As a deeply researched but accessible guide to the life of one of nineteenth-century Europe’s most compelling and significant political figures, it stands head and shoulders above other Bismarck biographies."

== Non-academic appointments ==
Steinberg served as an expert witness in the Commonwealth of Australia War Crimes prosecution. He was also appointed to the Historical Commission of the Deutsche Bank AG, Frankfurt am Main to examine bank activity and gold transactions during World War II.

He was a member of the Board of Trustees of Franklin University Switzerland in Lugano, Switzerland, and the Presidential Advisory Commission on Holocaust Assets.
