= IfNotNow =

American Jewish lobby group for Palestinian rights

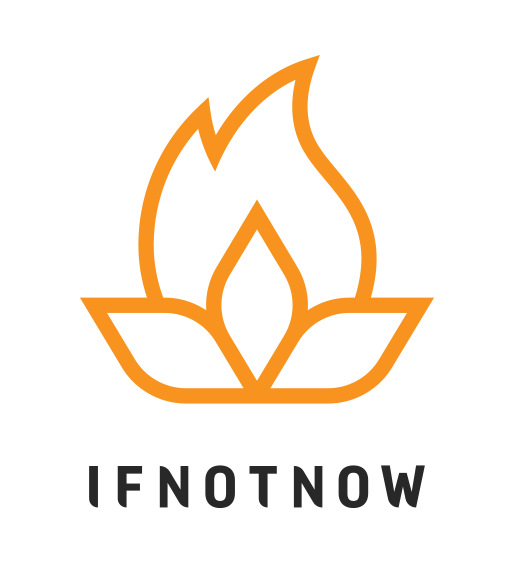
- Founded: July 2014
- Location: United States
- Revenue: $1.33 million (2024)
- Expenses: $936,000 (2024)
- Website: ifnotnowmovement.org

IfNotNow is an American left-wing Jewish activist group that opposes the Israeli occupation of the West Bank and Gaza Strip. IfNotNow was founded in 2014 during the 2014 Gaza War.

== Founding ==
IfNotNow's first public action, then under the name "If Not Now, When?", was in July 2014 to protest the Conference of Presidents of Major American Jewish Organizations's support for Israel during the 2014 Israel–Gaza conflict. Activists recited the Jewish prayer of mourning, the Mourner's Kaddish, for all Palestinian and Israeli victims of the war outside the Conferences' office.

The name IfNotNow is derived from a saying of the 1st-century BCE and early 1st-century CE Jewish sage Rabbi Hillel the Elder recorded in Pirkei Avot 1:14: "If I am not for myself, who will be for me? If I am only for myself, what am I? And if not now, when?"

== Views ==
The organization has been variously characterized as progressive or left-wing. The group opposes the Israeli occupation of the West Bank and Gaza Strip, and has been variously described as anti-Zionist or non-Zionist. During a 2025 webinar hosted by IfNotNow, guest speaker Mahmoud Khalil characterized IfNotNow as an "anti-Zionist Jewish space." There were no reports of the group objecting to the characterization. In 2023, IfNotNow was generally considered as more moderate than Jewish Voice for Peace, which openly characterizes itself as anti-Zionist and supports a boycott of Israel.

Going beyond critiquing the actions of Israel, IfNotNow proposes a Jewish diasporic cultural identity that Professor David Graizbord of the University of Arizona characterized as "left-progressive pan-Judaism." IfNotNow rejects liberal Zionist, centrist, and religious Zionist readings of Jewish history and tradition by characterizing them as artefacts of an out-of-touch American Jewish establishment. IfNotNow is largely agnostic to the desirability of Israel's existence, converging upon the idea that true Jewishness is internationalist and progressive.

IfNotNow endorsed Zohran Mamdani in the 2025 New York City mayoral election.

== Strategy ==
IfNotNow is a movement-based organization, designed to appeal directly to the public through social media and direct action; their refusal to participate in closed-door meetings has been criticized by leaders of established Jewish institutions. The IfNotNow movement consists of Jewish Americans, typically millennials, who demonstrate against politicians, U.S. government policies, and Jewish institutions perceived to support the occupation, primarily through direct action and media appearances.

IfNotNow has sought to highlight similarities and ties between the Trump administration and the administration of Israeli Prime Minister Benjamin Netanyahu.

== Relationship with Jewish community ==
In 2016, the Jewish Federation of Los Angeles, which manages over $1 billion in charitable funds, refused to disburse donor money to IfNotNow.

IfNotNow campaigns against the American Israel Public Affairs Committee (AIPAC). IfNotNow describes AIPAC as having supported 109 "insurrectionist Republicans" and supported "rightwing antisemites." In August 2022, the AIPAC tweeted that "George Soros has a long history of backing anti-Israel groups...Now he's giving $1 million to help @jstreetdotorg support anti-Israel candidates and attack pro-Israel Democrats. AIPAC works to strengthen pro-Israel mainstream Democrats. J Street & Soros work to undermine them." In response to the tweet, IfNotNow denounced AIPAC for antisemitism, tweeting that "AIPAC is the antisemitic far right...They are not a Jewish org, nor claim to be one."

After the Hamas attack on Israel on October 7, IfNotNow issued a statement that "We cannot and will not say today's actions by Palestinian militants are unprovoked." According to historian Sara Yael Hirschhorn, IfNotNow's statement placed the group beyond "red lines" maintained by mainstream American Jews. IfNotNow's description of Israel's actions during the Gaza war as genocide led to Jewish artists Shoshana Jedwab and Rabbi Menachem Creditor to demand IfNotNow remove their songs from its literature and stop using their songs at protests.

In November 2023, the Anti-Defamation League classified protest events led by groups including Jewish Voice for Peace and IfNotNow as "anti-Israel", adding the protests to a database documenting rising antisemitism in the US. ADL CEO Jonathan Greenblatt labelled both organizations as "hate groups". This led to criticism of the ADL, including from its own staff, one of whom quit in protest, stating: "Those were Jewish people who we [as the ADL] were defaming, so that felt extremely, extremely confusing, and frustrating to me. And it makes it harder to talk about that when any criticism of Israel, or anyone who criticizes Israel, just becomes a terrorist."

== Activity ==
In 2017, members of IfNotNow were arrested for interrupting U.S. Ambassador to Israel David M. Friedman's Senate confirmation hearing, blowing a shofar and criticizing his support and funding of settlements in the West Bank.

IfNotNow, along with Jewish Voice for Peace, led an October 16, 2023, rally in Washington, D.C., that called for a ceasefire in the Gaza war and for United States President Joe Biden to support a ceasefire. Among the speakers was actor Wallace Shawn.

On November 15, 2023, they participated in the 2023 Democratic National Committee protests along with Jewish Voice for Peace and other pro-Palestinian protesters.

IfNotNow and JVP were two of the organizers of the pro-Palestinian protests at Columbia University during the Gaza war.

== Funding ==
IfNotNow is supported by the Tides Foundation, which is seeded by Democratic megadonor George Soros.

== See also ==
- Anti-Occupation Bloc – Israeli political alliance
