= DNC protests =

DNC protests may refer to:

- 1968 Democratic National Convention protests
- 2000 Democratic National Convention protest activity
- 2023 Democratic National Committee protests
