= Idra Novey =

American novelist, poet, and translator

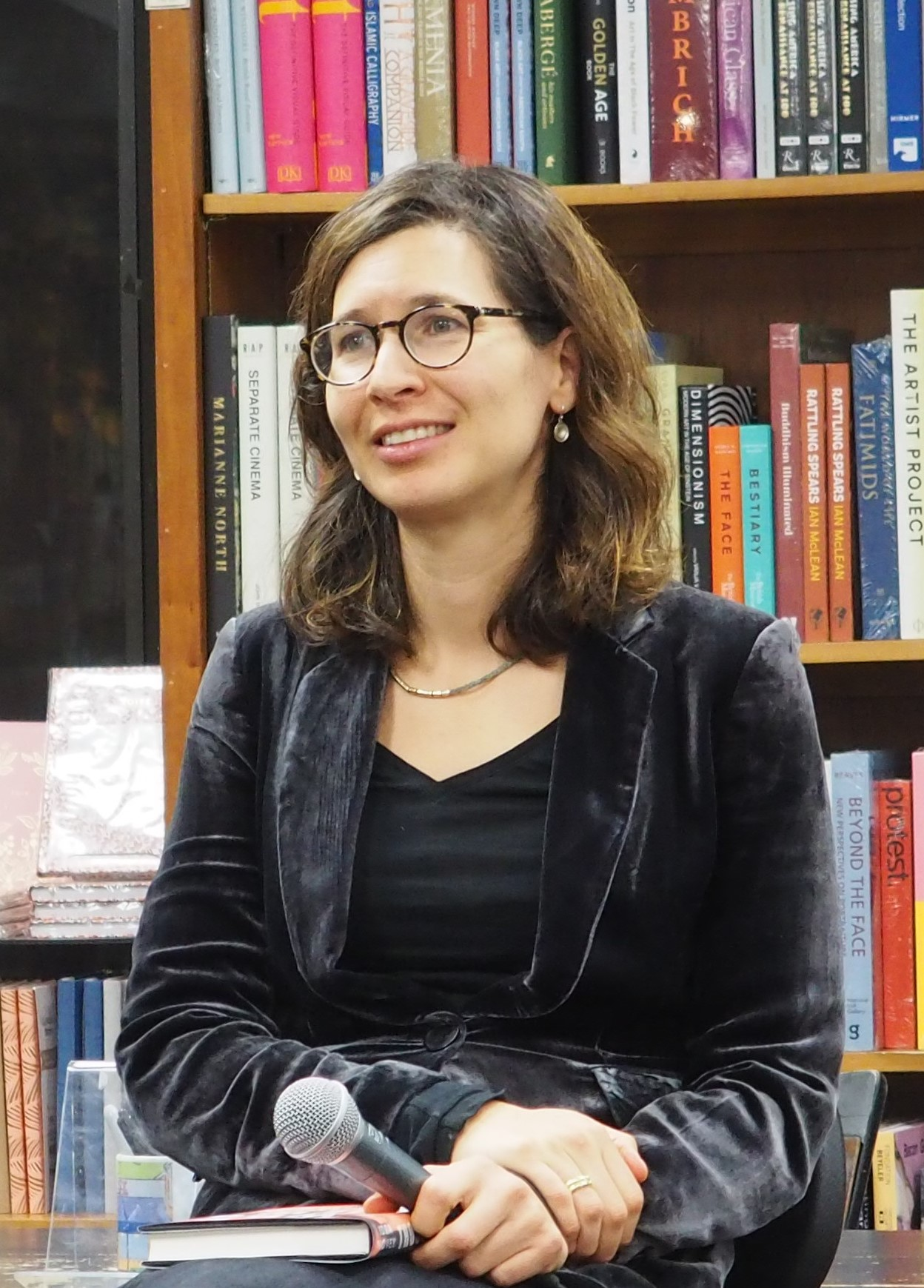
- Born: Western Pennsylvania
- Education: BA, Barnard College, 2000; MFA, Columbia University
- Occupations: Writer, poet, translator

Idra Novey is an American novelist, poet, and translator. She translates from Portuguese, Spanish, and Persian and now lives in Brooklyn, New York.

== Career ==
Novey is a novelist, poet, and translator. She is the author of the novels Take What You Need (2023), a New York Times Notable Book, Ways to Disappear (2016) and Those Who Knew (2018), which received the 2017 Sami Rohr Prize, the 2016 Brooklyn Eagles Prize, and was a finalist for the L.A. Times Book Prize for First Fiction. Those Who Knew was also a finalist for the 2019 Clark Fiction Prize, a New York Times Editors' Choice, and a Best Book of the Year with over a dozen media outlets, including NPR, Esquire, BBC, Kirkus Review, and O Magazine. Her poetry collections include Exit, Civilian (2011), selected for the 2011 National Poetry Series, The Next Country (2008), a finalist for the 2008 Foreword Book of the Year Award, and Clarice: The Visitor, a collaboration with the artist Erica Baum. Her fiction and poetry have been translated into a dozen languages and she's written for The New York Times, The Los Angeles Times, New York Magazine, and The Paris Review. She is the recipient of awards from the National Endowment for the Arts, Poets & Writers Magazine, the PEN Translation Fund, the Poetry Foundation, and The Pushcart Prize. Her works as a translator include Clarice Lispector's novel The Passion According to G.H. and a co-translation with Ahmad Nadalizadeh of Iranian poet Garous Abdolmalekian, Lean Against This Late Hour, a finalist for the PEN America Poetry in Translation Prize in 2021. She teaches fiction in the MFA Program at NYU and at Princeton University.

She is the most recent translator of The Passion According to G.H. by Clarice Lispector, On Elegance While Sleeping by Viscount Lascano Tegui, Birds for a Demolition by Manoel de Barros, and The Clean Shirt of It by Paulo Henriques Britto. With Ahmad Nadalizadeh, she has co-translated from Persian a collection of Iranian poet Garous Abdolmalekian, entitled Lean Against This Late Hour (2020).

Her fiction and poetry have been translated into ten languages, and she has received awards from Poets & Writers, the Poetry Foundation, the Brooklyn Eagles Literary Prize, and the National Endowment of the Arts.

== Personal life ==
Idra grew up in Johnstown, Pennsylvania, one of four siblings. She graduated from Barnard College, and from Columbia University. She lives with her family in Brooklyn, New York.

== Published works ==
=== Novels ===
- Ways to Disappear (Little, Brown & Company, 2016) ISBN 9780316298506
- Those Who Knew (Viking Books, 2018) ISBN 9780525560432
- Take What You Need (Viking Books, 2023) ISBN 9780593652855

=== Full-length poetry collections ===
- The Next Country Alice James Books, 2008. ISBN 9781882295715
- Exit, Civilian: Poems. University of Georgia Press. 2012. ISBN 9780820343488.
- Soon and Wholly, Wesleyan University Press, September 2024. ISBN 978-0-8195-0128-8

=== Chapbooks and cahiers ===
- The Next Country (Poetry Society of America, 2005)
- Clarice: The Visitor, with images by Erica Baum (Sylph Editions, 2014)

=== Translations ===
- Dark Period, by Garous Abdolmalekian in The New York Times Magazine, co-translated with Ahmad Nadalizadeh.
- Oh! by Luis Muñoz for Poem-a-Day, co-translated with Garth Greenwell.
- The Clean Shirt of It, by Paulo Henriques Britto BOA Editions, Ltd., 2007. ISBN 9781929918935
- On Elegance While Sleeping, by Emilio Lascano Tegui (Dalkey Archive, 2010. ISBN 9781564786043
- Birds for a Demolition, by Manoel de Barros Carnegie Mellon University Press, 2010. ISBN 9780887485237
- The Passion According to G.H., by Clarice Lispector New Directions, 2012. ISBN 9780141197357
- Lean Against This Late Hour, by Garous Abdolmalekian, co-translated with Ahmad Nadalizadeh, Penguin Press, 2020. ISBN 9780143134930

=== Short stories ===
- "The Man from the Ad" (Guernica, 2011)
- "The Specialist" (StoryQuarterly, 2015)
- "Under the Lid" (The American Scholar, 2016)
- "Husband and Wife During the Nightly News" (The Yale Review, Winter 2019)
- "Harmony, Interrupted" (The Chronicles of Now, 2020)
- "The Glacier" (The Yale Review, Summer 2021, winner of a 2022 Pushcart Prize)
- "Conversations with My Father" (Granta, 2023)

=== Selected poems ===
- "The Visitor" (Poetry Foundation, 2012)
- "La Prima Victoria" (Poetry Foundation, 2012)
- "On Returning to My Hometown in 2035" (Poetry Foundation, 2014)
- "The Duck Shit at Clarion Creek" (Poetry Foundation, 2014)
- "House-Sitting With Approaching Fire" (Guernica, 2014)
- "Still Life With Invisible Canoe" (Academy of American Poets, 2015)
- "Nearly" (Poets.org, 2019)
- "Night Sky with Blue Silo and a Bonfire" (A Public Space, 2022)
- "That's How Far I'd Drive for It" (Poetry Foundation, 2023)

=== Nonfiction ===
- "‘Change Your Life,’ the Poet Says, and a Rural Idyll Offers a Tantalizing Choice" (The New York Times, 2018)
- "New Narratives and Discards" (Orion Magazine, March 2023)
- "Monstrous Hybrids and the Conjuring of Legacy" (Yale Review, 2023)

== Honors and awards ==
- 2005 Poetry Society of America Chapbook Series Fellowship for The Next Country
- 2007 Kinereth Gensler Award for The Next Country
- 2007 PEN Translation Fund Grant from PEN American Center for The Clean Shirt of It
- 2009 NEA Literature Fellowship for Translation
- 2011 Best Translated Book Award (shortlisted) for On Elegance While Sleeping
- 2011 National Poetry Series for Exit, Civilian
- 2016 Art Seidenbaum Award for First Fiction (finalist) for Ways to Disappear
- 2016 Barnes & Noble Discover Great New Writers Award for Ways to Disappear
- 2016 Brooklyn Eagles Literary Prize for Ways to Disappear
- 2017 Sami Rohr Prize for Ways to Disappear
- 2022 Pushcart Prize for "The Glacier", Yale Review

== External links. ==
Media related to Idra Novey at Wikimedia Commons

- Official website
