= Lucette Lagnado =

Egyptian-born American journalist and memoirist (1956–2019)

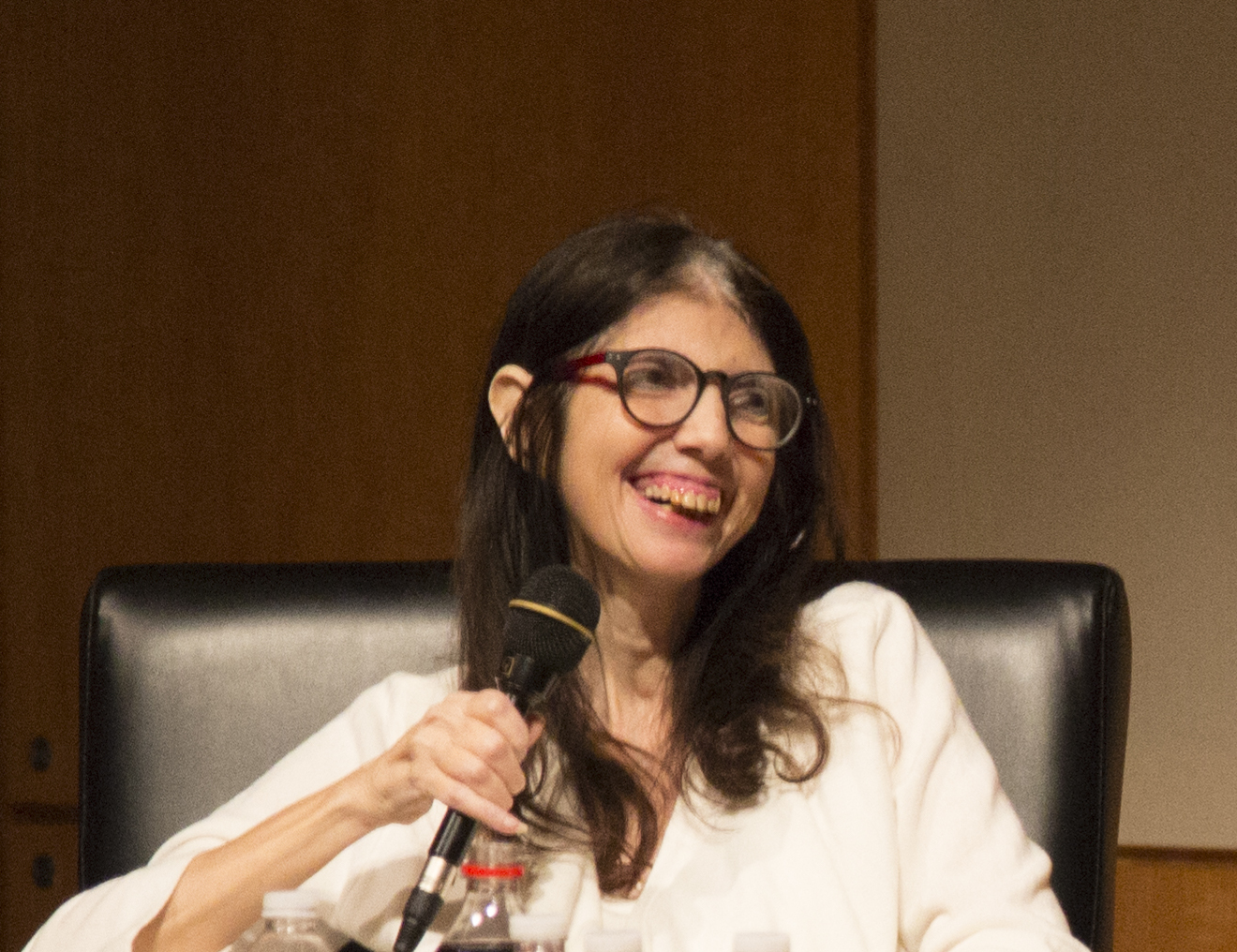
- Lagnado in 2019
- Born: Lucette Matalon Lagnado; September 19, 1956; Cairo, Egypt
- Died: July 10, 2019 (aged 62)
- Education: A.B. Vassar College
- Occupations: Journalist and memoirist
- Spouse: Douglas Feiden (m. 1995)

Lucette Matalon Lagnado (September 19, 1956 – July 10, 2019) was an Egyptian-born American journalist and memoirist of Syrian origin. She was a reporter for The Wall Street Journal.

== Biography ==
Lagnado was born to a Syrian Jewish family in Cairo, Egypt. She attended P.S. 205 in Bensonhurst, Brooklyn, New York City, and was a graduate of Vassar College. Lagnado wrote a prize-winning memoir about her childhood, The Man in the White Sharkskin Suit: My Family's Exodus from Old Cairo to the New World. The book, published by Ecco, was awarded the 2008 Sami Rohr Prize for Jewish Literature. The prize, which is administered by the New York-based Jewish Book Council, comes with a $100,000 stipend and is the richest cash award in the Jewish literary world. The presentation of the Rohr Prize took place in Jerusalem in April 2008. The Man in the White Sharkskin Suit was optioned by producer Anthony Bregman (Eternal Sunshine of the Spotless Mind), according to a December 2008 announcement in Publishers Marketplace.

In September 2011, she published a companion volume to "Sharkskin" that tells the story of Lagnado's mother, Edith. The Arrogant Years: One Girl's Search for Her Lost Youth, from Cairo to Brooklyn (Ecco/HarperCollins) juxtaposes the author's own coming of age in New York with that of her mother in Cairo, revealing how the choices she made meant both a liberation from Old World traditions and the loss of a comforting and familiar community. The book was described by the publisher as an epic family saga of faith and fragility.

== Personal life ==
In 1995, she married journalist Douglas Feiden in a Jewish ceremony at a Manhattan Sephardic Congregation; the couple lived in New York City and Sag Harbor on the East End of Long Island.

Lagnado died on July 10, 2019, at the age of 62.

== Bibliography ==
- Children of the Flames: Dr. Josef Mengele and the Untold Story of the Twins of Auschwitz
- The Man in the White Sharkskin Suit
- The Arrogant Years

== Honors and prizes ==
- Sami Rohr Prize for Jewish Literature
- Mike Berger Award
- Newswomen's Club of New York Front Page Awards (Three time winner)
- Columbia Journalism Review "Laurel"
- Selden Ring Award for Investigative Reporting, finalist 2004
