= Paul Goldberg (writer) =

Russian-American writer (born 1959)

- Born: July 31, 1959 (age 67)
- Education: Duke University
- Occupations: Novelist, journalist

Paul Goldberg (born April 25, 1959) is a Russian–American writer and the long-time editor and publisher of The Cancer Letter. His debut novel was The Yid (2016).

== Life and career ==
Born in Moscow, Goldberg immigrated to the United States at the age of 14, and graduated from Duke University in 1981. Goldberg became editor of The Cancer Letter in 1994, eventually becoming publisher and editor in 2011.

Goldberg had written two non-fiction books before his first novel The Yid, a tragicomic heist novel set in the USSR, was published in 2016. The novel was nominated for the Sami Rohr Prize for Jewish Literature, as well as National Jewish Book Award's Goldberg Prize for Debut Fiction. His second novel The Château, a satire centered on a South Florida condo board, was published in 2018. His third novel The Dissident was published in 2023.

== Novels ==
- The Yid (2016)
- The Château (2018)
- The Dissident (2023)
