= Oren Kessler =

American political analyst, author, and journalist

Oren Kessler FRHistS
- Born: 1982 (age 43–44); Rochester, New York, US
- Education: University of Toronto (BA); Reichman University (MA)
- Occupations: Political analyst, author, journalist
- Notable work: Palestine 1936: The Great Revolt and the Roots of the Middle East Conflict
- Spouse: Clara Kessler (m. 2023)
- Website: orenkessler.com

Oren Kessler (born 1982) is an American international politics analyst, author, and journalist.

== Background and education ==
Kessler was born in Rochester, New York. He earned a Bachelor of Arts degree in history from the University of Toronto and a Master of Arts in diplomacy and conflict studies from Reichman University.

== Career ==
Kessler was deputy director for research at the Foundation for Defense of Democracies in Washington, D.C., was Arab affairs correspondent for The Jerusalem Post, was an editor, translator, and writer for the English edition of Haaretz, and was a research fellow and director of the Centre for the New Middle East at the Henry Jackson Society think tank in London during which he testified before the UK House of Commons and the European Union Parliament on Middle East issues. He is a fellow of the Royal Historical Society and his work has appeared in publications including The Wall Street Journal, Foreign Policy, Politico, The Washington Post, The New Republic, Foreign Affairs, The Free Press, and U.S. News & World Report.

He had corresponded extensively with fellow journalist Steven Sotloff in the months before Sotloff was murdered by ISIS militants in 2014. Sotloff wrote to Kessler in 2011 to introduce himself as a fellow former Reichman student. The two had both covered the Arab Spring, and, at the time Sotloff first contacted him, he was reporting from Libya while Kessler was covering the country for The Jerusalem Post. Kessler was also one of the journalists targeted by former CNN correspondent Jim Clancy in a 2015 Twitter incident that led to Clancy's resignation.

As of 2026, Kessler was based in Tel Aviv and Washington. His book, Palestine 1936: The Great Revolt and the Roots of the Middle East Conflict, was published by Rowman & Littlefield in February 2023 and named one of The Wall Street Journal’s 10 best books of 2023, a Booklist best book of the year, and the 2024 winner of the Sami Rohr Prize for Jewish Literature. For the 2026-27 academic year he will be the Goldman Visiting Professor in the government department of Georgetown University teaching undergraduate and graduate courses on Israel and the Middle East.

== Personal life ==
On October 7, 2023, Kessler married his wife, Clara, whom he had met when she was an intern at the Foundation for Defense of Democracies in 2015. Kessler's wife is Jewish, while he is a Christian.
