= Moriah (newspaper) =

Hebrew daily newspaper

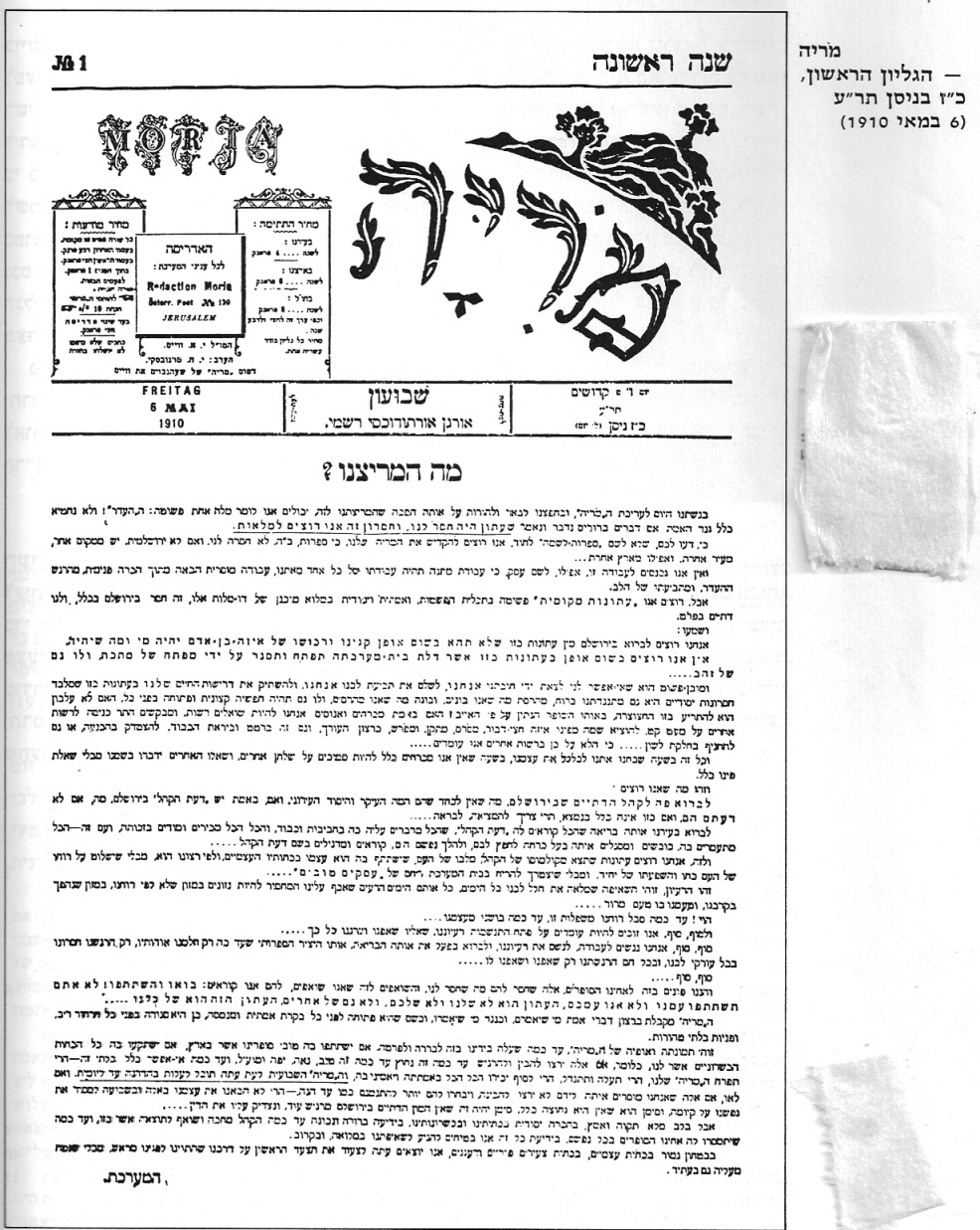
- The first issue - 6 May 1910
- Type: Weekly, then - daily
- Owner(s): Moriah printer house, Jerusalem
- Founded: 6 May 1910
- Language: Hebrew
- Ceased publication: 11 January 1915
- Country: Ottoman Palestine

Moriah was a Hebrew language daily newspaper, published in Ottoman Palestine between 1910 and 1915.

== History ==
The newspaper was founded in Jerusalem by the printer Rabbi Yehuda Aharon Weiss, after the downfall of "Habazeleth", which was, prior to that, the leading newspaper of the Haredi Jewish community in Jerusalem. The permit to publish "Moriah", which was also the name of the printing house that produced the newspaper (owned by Weiss and his partner, Rabbi Moshe Samuel Schinbaum), was granted by the Ottoman authorities, after they were assured they would abide by the Ottoman law.

The newspaper's chief editor, throughout all its years of publication, was Yitzhak Yaakov Yellin, who also wrote a significant portion of its articles. Together with Weiss, Yellin made it a goal for the newspaper to reform the "Old Yishuv" and its public conduct. Right from the first issue, the founders expressed their intent of addressing the Haredi Jews in a manner representing free speech and objectivity.

The first issues of "Moriah" were published weekly, but later it was published daily, with an extended weekly issue intended for readers outside the country.

The newspaper was shut down by the Ottoman authorities on 11 January 1915 (כ"ה בטבת תרע"ה), at the height of the First World War, after Yellin breached the order to refrain from dealing with political matters.
