= Allison Amend =

American novelist and short story writer

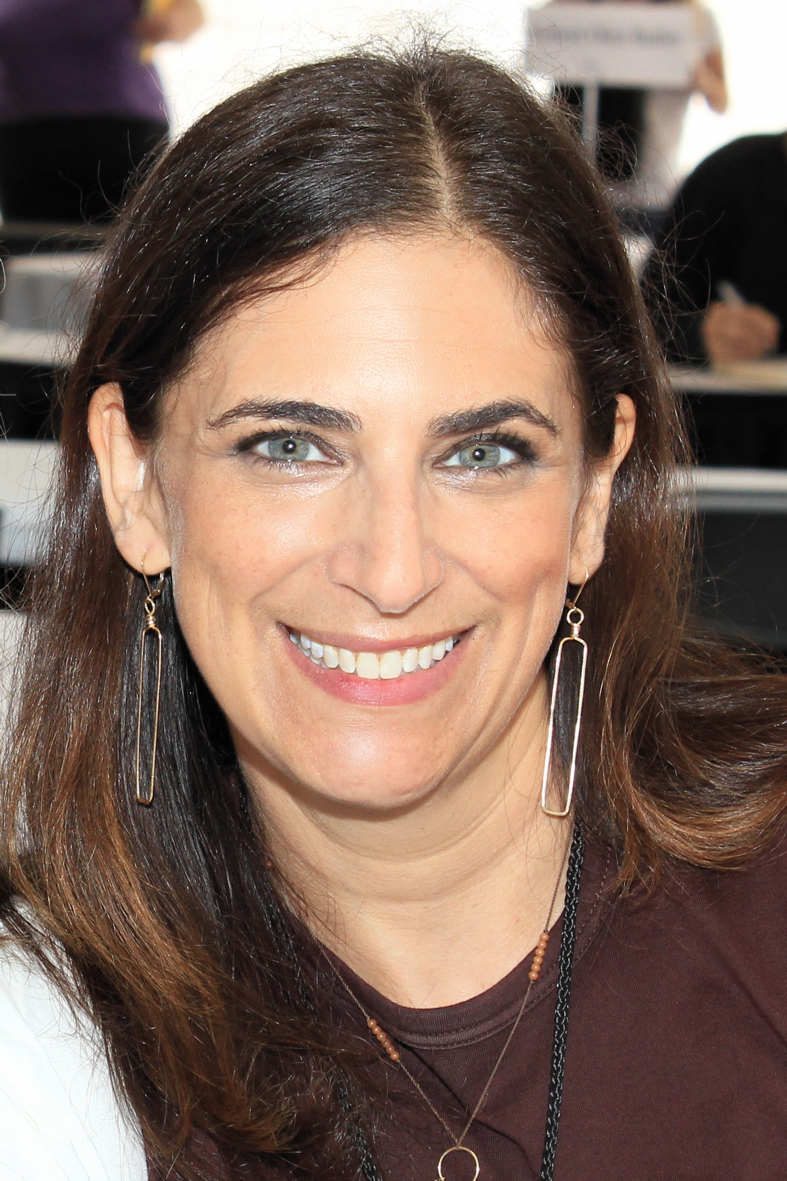
- Amend at the 2016 Texas Book Festival
- Born: May 20, 1974 (age 52); Chicago, Illinois, U.S.
- Education: Stanford University; University of Iowa Writer's Workshop
- Writing career
- Genres: Novel, Short Story
- Notable awards: Sami Rohr Prize finalist
- Website: allisonamend.com

Allison Amend (born May 20, 1974) is an American novelist and short story writer.

== Early life ==
Amend was born in Chicago, Illinois, attended Stanford University where she majored in comparative literature, and received an MFA from the Iowa Writers' Workshop at the University of Iowa.

== Career ==
In 2008, OV Books, an imprint of Dzanc Books, published her debut book, a short story collection called Things That Pass for Love. She has published two novels and a third was published by Nan A. Talese in May 2016. Amend teaches writing at Lehman College in New York City.

== Publications ==
=== Novels ===
- Stations West: a novel. Louisiana State University Press (2010) ISBN 978-0807136171
- A Nearly Perfect Copy: a novel. Nan A. Talese (2013) ISBN 9780385536691
- Enchanted Islands: a novel. Nan A. Talese (24 May 2016) ISBN 978-0385539067

=== Short story collections ===
- Things That Pass for Love. Dzanc Books (2008) ISBN 9780976717744

== Awards ==
- Sami Rohr Prize finalist
