= Sami Rohr Prize for Jewish Literature =

Award for Judaism-related literature

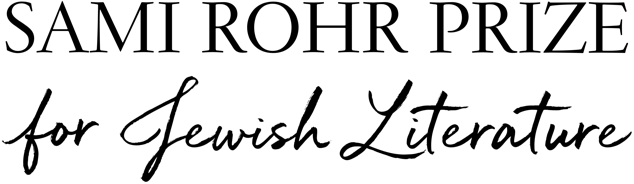
- Awarded for: recognising the unique role of contemporary writers in the transmission and examination of the Jewish experience, and to encourage and promote outstanding writing of Jewish interest.
- Country: United States
- First award: 2007
- Website: samirohrprize.org

The Sami Rohr Prize for Jewish Literature is an annual prize awarded to an outstanding literary work of Jewish interest by an emerging writer. Previously administered by the Jewish Book Council, it is now given in association with the National Library of Israel.

== History ==
In 2006, the family of Jewish philanthropist Sami Rohr honored his lifelong love of Jewish learning and great books by establishing the Sami Rohr Prize for Jewish Literature on his 80th birthday. At its inception, the $100,000 prize was the largest literary prize in North America. The second place winner receives the Jewish Literature Choice Award of $25,000.

The annual award, inaugurated in 2007, seeks to promote writings of Jewish interest and encourage the examination of Jewish values among emerging writers. Awardees are honored at an August ceremony at the National Library of Israel in Jerusalem. The award was initially administered by the Jewish Book Council.

In 2023, Israeli author Iddo Geffen won the prize, the first time it was awarded to the author of a Hebrew-language work and its translator, Daniella Zamir. The award to a translated work represented an effort to expand the reach of the prize to non-English works.

== Honorees ==
Sami Rohr Prize for Jewish Literature honorees
| Year | Author | Title | Result | Ref. |
|---|---|---|---|---|
| 2007 | Tamar Yellin | The Genizah at the House of Shepher | Winner | |
| 2007 | Michael Lavigne | Not Me | Runner-up | |
| 2007 | Amir Gutfreund | Our Holocaust | Runner-up | |
| 2007 | Yael Hedaya | Accidents | Shortlist | |
| 2007 | Naomi Alderman | Disobedience | Shortlist | |
| 2008 | Lucette Lagnado | The Man in the White Sharkskin Suit | Winner | |
| 2008 | Eric Goldstein | The Price of Whiteness | Runner-up | |
| 2008 | Ilana Blumberg | Houses of Study | Runner-up | |
| 2008 | Haim Watzman | A Crack in the Earth | Shortlist | |
| 2008 | Michael Makovsky | Churchill's Promised Land | Shortlist | |
| 2009 | Sana Krasikov | One More Year | Winner | |
| 2009 | Dalia Sofer | The Septembers of Shiraz | Runner-up | |
| 2009 | Elisa Albert | The Book of Dahlia | Shortlist | |
| 2009 | Anne Landsman | The Rowing Lesson | Shortlist | |
| 2009 | Anya Ulinich | Petropolis | Shortlist | |
| 2010 | Kenneth B. Moss | Jewish Renaissance in the Russian Revolution | Winner (tie) | |
| 2010 | Sarah Abrevaya Stein | Plumes: Ostrich Feathers, Jews, and a Lost World of Global Commerce | Winner (tie) | |
| 2010 | Lila Corwin Berman | Speaking of Jews: Rabbis, Intellectuals, and the Creation of an American Public Identity | Shortlist | |
| 2010 | Ari Y. Kelman | Station Identification: A Cultural History of Yiddish Radio in the United States | Shortlist | |
| 2010 | Danya Ruttenberg | Surprised by God: How I Learned to Stop Worrying and Love Religion | Shortlist | |
| 2011 | Austin Ratner | The Jump Artist | Winner | |
| 2011 | Joseph Skibell | A Curable Romantic | Runner-up | |
| 2011 | Nadia Kalman | The Cosmopolitans | Shortlist | |
| 2011 | Julie Orringer | The Invisible Bridge | Shortlist | |
| 2011 | Allison Amend | Stations West | Shortlist | |
| 2012 | Gal Beckerman | When They Come for Us, We'll Be Gone: The Epic Struggle to Save Soviet Jewry | Winner | |
| 2012 | Abigail Green | Moses Montefiore: Jewish Liberator, Imperial Hero | Runner-up | |
| 2012 | Ruth Franklin | A Thousand Darknesses: Lies and Truth in Holocaust Fiction | Shortlist | |
| 2012 | Jonathan B. Krasner | The Benderly Boys and American Jewish Education | Shortlist | |
| 2012 | James Loeffler | The Most Musical Nation: Jews and Culture in the Late Russian Empire | Shortlist | |
| 2013 | Francesca Segal | The Innocents | Winner | |
| 2013 | Ben Lerner | Leaving the Atocha Station | Runner-up | |
| 2013 | Stuart Nadler | The Book of Life | Shortlist | |
| 2013 | Asaf Schurr | Motti | Shortlist | |
| 2013 | Shani Boianjiu | The People of Forever Are Not Afraid | Shortlist | |
| 2014 | Matti Friedman | The Aleppo Codex: A True Story of Obsession, Faith, and the Pursuit of an Ancient Bible | Winner | |
| 2014 | Sarah Bunin Benor | Becoming Frum: How Newcomers Learn the Language and Culture of Orthodox Judaism | Runner-up | |
| 2014 | Eliyahu Stern | The Genius: Elijah of Vilna and the Making of Modern Judaism | Shortlist | |
| 2014 | Nina S. Spiegel | Embodying Hebrew Culture: Aesthetics, Athletics, and Dance in the Jewish Community of Mandate Palestine | Shortlist | |
| 2014 | Marni Davis | Jews and Booze: Becoming American in the Age of Prohibition | Shortlist | |
| 2015 | Ayelet Tsabari | The Best Place on Earth | Winner | |
| 2015 | Kenneth Bonert | The Lion Seeker | Runner-up | |
| 2015 | Yelena Akhtiorskaya | Panic in a Suitcase | Shortlist | |
| 2015 | Boris Fishman | A Replacement Life | Shortlist | |
| 2015 | Molly Antopol | The UnAmericans | Shortlist | |
| 2016 | Lisa Leff | The Archive Thief: The Man Who Salvaged French Jewish History in the Wake of the Holocaust | Winner | |
| 2016 | Yehudah Mirsky | Rav Kook: Mystic in a Time of Revolution | Runner-up | |
| 2016 | Aviyah Kushner | The Grammar of God: A Journey into the Words and Worlds of the Bible | Shortlist | |
| 2016 | Dan Ephron | Killing a King: The Assassination of Yitzhak Rabin and the Remaking of Israel | Shortlist | |
| 2016 | Adam Mendelsohn | The Rag Race: How Jews Sewed Their Way to Success in America and the British Empire | Shortlist | |
| 2017 | Idra Novey | Ways to Disappear | Winner | |
| 2017 | Daniel Torday | The Last Flight of Poxl West: A Novel | Runner-up | |
| 2017 | Rebecca Schiff | The Bed Moved: Stories | Shortlist | |
| 2017 | Paul Goldberg | The Yid | Shortlist | |
| 2017 | Adam Ehrlich Sachs | Inherited Disorders: Stories, Parables & Problems | Shortlist | |
| 2018 | Ilana Kurshan | If All the Seas Were Ink: A Memoir | Winner | |
| 2018 | Sara Yael Hirschhorn | City on a Hilltop: American Jews and the Israeli Settler Movement | Runner-up | |
| 2018 | Chanan Tigay | The Lost Book of Moses: The Hunt For The World's Oldest Bible | Shortlist | |
| 2018 | Yair Mintzker | The Many Deaths of Jew Süss: The Notorious Trial and Execution of an Eighteenth-Century Court Jew | Shortlist | |
| 2018 | Shari Rabin | Jews on the Frontier: Religion and Mobility in Nineteenth-Century America | Shortlist | |
| 2019 | Michael David Lukas | The Last Watchman of Old Cairo | Winner | |
| 2019 | Dalia Rosenfeld | The Words We Think We Know | Runner-up | |
| 2019 | Rachel Kadish | The Weight of Ink | Shortlist | |
| 2019 | Mark Sarvas | Memento Park | Shortlist | |
| 2019 | Margot Singer | Underground Fugue | Shortlist | |
| 2020 | Benjamin Balint | Kafka's Last Trial: The Case of a Literary Legacy | Winner | |
| 2020 | Sarah Hurwitz | Here All Along: Finding Meaning, Spirituality, and a Deeper Connection to Life--in Judaism (After Finally Choosing to Look There) | Shortlist | |
| 2020 | Yaakov Katz | Shadow Strike: Inside Israel's Secret Mission to Eliminate Syrian Nuclear Power | Shortlist | |
| 2020 | Mikhal Dekel | Tehran Children: A Holocaust Refugee Odyssey | Shortlist | |
| 2022 | Menachem Kaiser | Plunder: A Memoir of Family Property and Nazi Treasure | Winner | |
| 2022 | Danny Adeno Abebe, trans. by Eylon Levy | From Africa to Zion: The Shepherd Boy Who Became Israel's First Ethiopian-Born Journalist | Shortlist | |
| 2022 | Ayala Fader | Hidden Heretics: Jewish Doubt in the Digital Age | Shortlist | |
| 2023 | Iddo Gefen, trans. by Daniella Zamir | Jerusalem Beach | Winner | |
| 2023 | Anna Solomon | The Book of V | Shortlist | |
| 2023 | Mikolaj Grynberg, trans. by Sean Gasper Bye | I'd Like To Say I'm Sorry, But There's No One To Say Sorry To | Shortlist | |
| 2023 | Max Gross | The Lost Shtetl | Shortlist | |
| 2024 | Oren Kessler | Palestine 1936: The Great Revolt and the Roots of the Middle East Conflict | Winner | |
| 2024 | Jeremy Eichler | Time's Echo: The Second World War, the Holocaust, and the Music of Remembrance | Shortlist | |
| 2024 | Michael Frank | One Hundred Saturdays: Stella Levi and the Search for a Lost World | Shortlist | |
| 2024 | Natalie Livingstone | The Women of Rothschild: The Untold Story of the World's Most Famous Dynasty | Shortlist | |
| 2025 | Sasha Vasilyuk | Your Presence Is Mandatory | Winner | |
| 2025 | Toby Lloyd | Fervor | Shortlist | |
| 2025 | Benjamin Resnick | Next Stop | Shortlist | |
| 2025 | Janice Weizman | Our Little Histories | Shortlist | |
| 2026 | Amir Tibon | The Gates of Gaza: A Story of Betrayal, Survival, and Hope in Israel's Borderlands | Winner | |
| 2026 | Laura Hobson Faure | Who Will Rescue Us?: The Story of the Jewish Children who Fled to France and America During the Holocaust | Shortlist | |
| 2026 | Shaul Kelner | A Cold War Exodus: How American Activists Mobilized to Free Soviet Jews | Shortlist | |
| 2026 | Jordan Salama | Stranger in the Desert: A Family Story | Shortlist | |
