= Tamar Yellin =

English author and teacher

- Born: 1963 (age 62–63); Leeds, England
- Education: University of Oxford
- Writing career
- Language: English
- Genre: Fiction
- Notable work: The Genizah at the House of Shepher
- Notable awards: Sami Rohr Prize for Jewish Literature (2007)
- Website: tamaryellin.com

Tamar Yellin (born 1963) is an English author and teacher who lives in Yorkshire. Her first novel, The Genizah at the House of Shepher, won the 2007 Sami Rohr Prize for Jewish Literature.

== Biography ==
Tamar Yellin was born and raised in Leeds. Her father was a third-generation native of Jerusalem; his father was Yitzhak Yaakov Yellin (1885–1964), one of the pioneers of the Hebrew language press in Palestine. Her mother was the daughter of a Polish immigrant to England.

Yellin attended the Leeds Girls' High School. She studied biblical and modern Hebrew language and Arabic language at the University of Oxford.

She spent 13 years writing her first novel, The Genizah at the House of Shepher (2005), and took two years to find a publisher. This was followed by a collection of 13 short stories, Kafka in Brontëland (2006) and another novel, Tales of the Ten Lost Tribes (2008). She also writes fiction for magazines, including The London Magazine and the Jewish Quarterly, and has published stories in two anthologies, The Slow Mirror and Other Stories: New Fiction by Jewish Writers (1996) and Mordecai's First Brush with Love: New Stories by Jewish Women in Britain (2004).

Yellin is a teacher for the Interfaith Education Center, in which capacity she speaks to non-Jewish schoolchildren about Jewish religious practices.

== Writing style ==
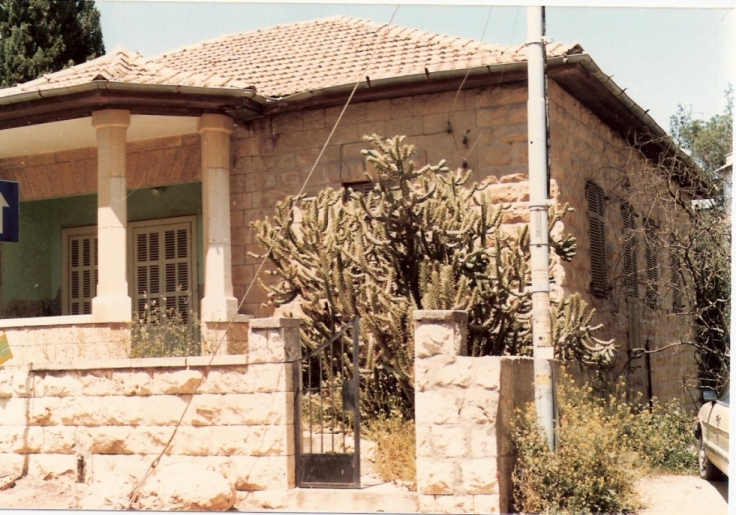
Yitzhak Yaakov Yellin's house in Kiryat Moshe, Jerusalem

Yellin incorporates much of her own personal history in her work. The plot for her first novel, The Genizah at the House of Shepher was based on her family's discovery of historic notes on the Aleppo Codex in the attic of their home.

== Prizes ==
- 2007 Sami Rohr Prize for Jewish Literature, for The Genizah at the House of Shepher. The prize money was $100,000.
- 2007 Reform Judaism Prize for Jewish Fiction, for her short-story collection, Kafka in Bronteland
- 2006 Harold U. Ribalow Prize, for The Genizah at the House of Shepher

== Bibliography ==
- Tales of the Ten Lost Tribes. Toby Press. 2008. ISBN 978-1592642137.
- Kafka in Brontëland. Toby Press. 2006. ISBN 1592641539.
- The Genizah at the House of Shepher. Toby Press. 2005. ISBN 1592641156.
