= Menachem Kaiser =

Canadian writer

- Education: Columbia University (BA); University of Michigan (MFA)
- Occupations: writer, journalist
- Awards: Sami Rohr Prize for Jewish Literature (2022)

Menachem Kaiser is a Canadian writer. He received the 2022 Sami Rohr Prize for Jewish Literature for his book Plunder: A Memoir of Family Property and Nazi Treasure.

== Biography ==
Kaiser grew up in Toronto, Ontario and graduated from Columbia University in 2009. He then received an MFA from the University of Michigan, and was a Fulbright Fellow to Lithuania. As part of his Fulbright grant, he taught at Vilnius University and created the Vilnius Ghetto Project, an interactive map of the Vilna Ghetto which allows users to explore the streets and buildings of the former ghetto from the perspective of its former residents.

Kaiser's grandfather, Maier Menachem Kajzer, was a Jew born in Sosnowiec, Poland who survived The Holocaust before moving to Los Angeles and spent years trying to reclaim his family's apartment building in Sosnowiec. Kaiser documented his journey of trying to reclaim his family's property in Poland and discovering his family's surprising connections to the land in the book Plunder: A Memoir of Family Property and Nazi Treasure, which won the 2022 Sami Rohr Prize. Among his discoveries were that, his grandfather's first cousin, Abraham Kajzer, was the author of a Holocaust memoir, “Za Drutami Śmierci,” which in part detailed his time spent constructing the Project Riese where many suspect treasure looted during the Holocaust was hidden and became popular among Polish treasure hunters. In Plunder, Kaiser teams up with a group of such treasure hunters in an effort to learn more about his own family history.
