= Jews and Booze =

2012 book

- Author: Marni Davis
- Publisher: New York University Press
- Publication date: January 1, 2012
- Pages: 248
- ISBN: 978-0-8147-2028-8

Jews and Booze: Becoming American in the Age of Prohibition is a history book by Marni Davis. It was published in 2012 by New York University Press.

== Reception ==
It received a positive reviews from Kirkus Reviews, which called it a "fascinating, nuanced social history."

After publishing the book, Davis was nominated for the Sami Rohr Prize for Jewish Literature. Edward Shapiro of the Jewish Book Council who called it an "engrossing and well-written" addition to American Jewish historiography.

Rich Cohen, in a review for Commentary, praised the book's detail and research but felt that it did not adequately develop the historical people mentioned beyond footnotes in its larger story. Sam Roberts in The New York Times gave it a mixed review.
