= Anil Potti =

Cancer scientist accused of misconduct and fraud

Anil Potti is a physician and former Duke University associate professor and cancer researcher, focusing on oncogenomics. He, along with Joseph Nevins, are at the center of a research fabrication scandal at Duke University. On 9 November 2015, the Office of Research Integrity (ORI) found that Potti had engaged in research misconduct. According to Potti's voluntary settlement agreement with ORI, Potti can continue to perform research with the requirement of supervision until year 2020, while he "neither admits nor denies ORI's findings of research misconduct." As of 2024, Potti, employed at the Cancer Center of North Dakota, had 11 of his research publications retracted, one publication received an expression of concern, and two others had been corrected.

== Biography ==
Anil Potti graduated from Christian Medical College, Vellore, India in 1995. He finished an internship in Internal Medicine at the University of North Dakota School of Medicine in 1999. In 2006 Potti completed training in hematology and oncology at Duke University.

Potti resigned from Duke in 2010, following the discovery of flaws in the genomics research conducted at Duke and allegations of embellishments in his resume, assuming responsibility for the anomalies in the scientific research.

Following his resignation from Duke, Potti worked as an oncologist in South Carolina, but was let go in 2012.

== Scientific misconduct ==
According to the Office of Research Integrity (ORI), Potti engaged in scientific misconduct while a cancer researcher at both Duke University's Medical Center and School of Medicine. He resigned in November 2010 after Duke put him on administrative leave, terminated the clinical trials based on his research and retracted his published data.

Potti and his team were accused of falsifying data regarding the use of microarray genetic analysis for personalised cancer treatment, which was published in various prestigious scientific journals. While there were questions concerning Potti's work beginning in 2007, notably from two bioinformatic statisticians, Keith Baggerly and Kevin Coombes at MD Anderson Cancer Center, 2010 brought further and more widespread scrutiny when it was discovered by Paul Goldberg and reported in The Cancer Letter that Potti had claimed on his curriculum vitae that he had been a "Rhodes Scholar (Australian Board)". He said he was referring to the Association of Rhodes Scholars in Australia Scholarships, an award granted by an organisation of former Rhodes Scholars to bring Commonwealth citizens who attend overseas institutions in to Australia.

Potti's fraudulent research was funded by the US government through the National Institutes of Health; the National Heart, Lung, and Blood Institute; and the National Cancer Institute, in the form of six multi-year grants, and by the Howard Hughes Medical Institute.

60 Minutes described the case as "one of the biggest medical research frauds ever".

== University response ==
Duke University became aware of the suspicions of research misconduct by 2008, when a medical student working with Potti and Nevins withdrew his name from the research and submitted a memorandum entitled "Research Concerns" to the administration. The administration denied any misconduct and convinced the student not to report his experiences to the funding agency, Howard Hughes Medical Institute. Duke later falsely claimed that there had not been a whistleblower involved in the issue.

== Investigation ==
The Potti scandal prompted the Institute of Medicine to conduct a study of the proper use of genomics in clinical trials. The Institute of Medicine's report, entitled "Evolution of Translational Omics: Lessons Learned and the Path Forward", was published on 23 March 2012 and made detailed specific recommendations for clinical trials that incorporate "omics". In February 2012, Joseph Nevins stated that it was "abundantly clear" that there was "manipulated data" that could not have occurred by chance. This was confirmed by the 2015 ORI report.

== Aftermath ==
Healthcare companies cut ties with Potti after evidence surfaced that Potti had fabricated awards on his resume. The American Cancer Society stopped payments of a five-year grant which totalled $729,000 as Potti had received the grant based on his credentials. Duke University later reimbursed the American Cancer Society for the full amount of the grant.

Three clinical trials at Duke University Medical Center based on Potti's research came under scrutiny in 2009 and were temporarily suspended, then were permanently stopped in 2010. The United States Food and Drug Administration (USFDA) reviewed one of the studies in 2009, several years after its initiation, and concluded that the study would require an Investigational New Drug application, which had not been submitted. An FDA audit in 2011 further showed that an Investigational Device Exemption application had not been filed, but otherwise found "no significant deficiencies" in Duke's IRB conduct. Potti's medical licence record with the North Carolina Medical Board shows eleven settlements, each of at least $75,000, for incidents that appear to be related to these trials.

In late 2011, the North Carolina Medical Board reprimanded Potti but he retains his medical licence. The board issued its disciplinary action against Potti but imposed no sanctions. In its consent order, the North Carolina Medical Board stated that the board has no evidence from which it could conclude that Potti received funding for medical research as a result of the inaccuracies that he would not have otherwise received, but concluded that "...Potti's conduct as described herein constitutes unprofessional conduct..." In separate action on Potti's medical licence, the North Carolina Medical Board reviewed 11 payments made to settle malpractice claims and posted on its website that "no public action was warranted". Potti was issued a medical licence in Missouri on 1 February 2011; on 6 March 2012, the Missouri medical board (known as the Board of Registration for the Healing Arts) issued a reprimand on the basis of actions taken by the North Carolina Medical Board.

In January 2011 Potti applied for a medical licence in South Carolina, which was approved in April 2011. Potti was employed as a practising physician at the Coastal Cancer Center in Loris from March 2011 until 21 February 2012, when he was let go.

In addition to the settlements, two lawsuits also have been filed against Potti, as well as against Duke and other medical personnel there, charging medical negligence among other claims. In his response to the lawsuits, Potti stated that he was "not aware that false or improper data was included in the research."

Robert Califf of Duke testified that they had looked at 40 of Potti's publications and that two-thirds of them would be retracted in whole or in part. Science reported this as "The fallout from the Duke case includes 27 papers that Duke expects to be partially or completely retracted". As of February 2012, ten scientific papers authored by Potti and others have been retracted.

After leaving Duke, Potti hired Online Reputation Manager, a reputation management company, to improve search results for his name.

In February 2013, WordPress received DMCA takedown notices for Retraction Watch blog posts critical of Potti and the posts were removed. Retraction Watch alleges that these DMCA take-down notices were based on false claims. In November 2013, Automattic, provider of the WordPress webhost service that hosts Retraction Watch, filed suit against the filer of the takedown notice, saying that he had made those false claims in violation of the DMCA. This suit was later withdrawn because the defendant 'neither served an answer nor a motion for summary judgement, and indeed has not appeared'.

== Research questions and Institute of Medicine report on 'Omics' ==
Following questions raised about genomics research that was led by Potti and Nevins at Duke between 2004 and 2010, the National Cancer Institute requested that the Institute of Medicine (IOM) establish a committee to recommend ways to strengthen omics-based test development and evaluation. The IOM's recommendations released in March 2012 spoke to the many parties responsible for discovery and development of omics-based tests, including investigators, their institutions, sponsors of research, the FDA, and journals. The report identified best practices to enhance development, evaluation, and translation of omics-based tests while simultaneously reinforcing steps to ensure that these tests are appropriately assessed for scientific validity before they are used to guide patient treatment in clinical trials. The IOM's recommendations aimed to ensure that progress in omics test development is grounded in sound scientific practice and is reproducible, resulting not only in improved health care but also in continued public trust.

The IOM report further added that "failure by many parties [at Duke] to detect or act on problems with key data and computational methods … led to the inappropriate enrollment of patients in clinical trials, premature launch of companies and retraction of dozens of research papers." The report specifically called for scientific investigators to make the data, computer codes and computational procedures used to develop their clinical tests "publicly accessible for independent review" and to ensure that their data and research steps are presented comprehensibly. The report also found that so-called "omics" tests – such as genomics and proteomics, which are diagnostic tools based on molecular patterns – are in general highly prone to errors. IOM committee chair Gilbert Omenn, a computational biologist at the University of Michigan, said the problems could have been avoided. But he noted, as well, that those kinds of problems were not unique to Duke. "There are a lot of lessons here that surely apply to other places," Omenn said.

== Retracted papers ==
As of 2018, 11 papers co-authored by Potti have been retracted, and seven others have been corrected. Potti's retracted papers are:

"A Genomic Approach to Colon Cancer Risk Stratification Yields Biologic Insights into Therapeutic Opportunities"
This article was published by PNAS. Gene expressions could allow the researchers to see if tumours are uniform throughout. This could also be used with Colon Cancer. They also can help predict how a person will respond to treatment and improve prognosis. The authors said they wanted to retract this article because "…we have been unable to reproduce certain key experiments described in the paper regarding validation and use of the colon cancer prognostic signature. This includes the validation performed with dataset E-MEXP-1224, as reported in Fig. 2A, as well as the generation of prognostic scores for colon cancer cell lines, as reported in Fig. 4…"
"Validation of Gene Signatures that Predict the Response of Breast Cancer to Neoadjuvant Chemotherapy"
This article was published in Lancet Oncology. This study involved patients with oestrogen-receptor-negative breast cancer. The researchers wanted to confirm their previous studies of gene-expression signatures in predicting the effects of chemotherapeutic drugs. The article was retracted because the validity of the results was beginning to be questioned and because predictions were made off of the Nature Medicine article that was retracted.
"Genomic Signatures to Guide the Use of Chemotherapeutics"
This article was published in Nature Medicine. Gene expression signatures were developed with in vitro drug sensitivity data and Affymetrix microarray data. These were used to help predict response and sensitivity to chemotherapeutic drugs as well as corresponding drugs. This article was retracted after being corrected because many key experiments could not be reproduced.
"Gene Expression Signatures, Clinicopathological Features, and Individualized Therapy in Breast Cancer"
This article was published in JAMA (Journal of American Medicine Association). The patients had early-stage breast carcinoma. The study's main point was to find if gene expression signatures could refine breast cancer prognosis. This article talks about cancer, genomic technology, and chemotherapy and radiation. This article was retracted because a large part of the article was based on another article that Potti had written and had published in Nature Medicine. The article in Nature Medicine had been retracted because of failure to reproduce results.
"Pharmacogenomic Strategies Provide a Rational Approach to the Treatment of Cisplatin-Resistant Patients with Advanced Cancer"
This article was published in the Journal of Clinical Oncology. Usually, platinum-based chemotherapy is used to treat non-small cell lung cancer, but how patients respond is highly variable. This article also talks about predicting how individuals will respond to cisplatin and pemetrexed. This article was retracted because experiments could not be reproduced.
"Gene-expression Patterns Predict Phenotypes of Immune-mediated Thrombosis"
This article was published in the journal Blood. Venous thromboembolism (VTE) affects about 3 in 1000 Americans. Out of the three, 10% have aPLAs. This study consisted of 129 patients. Out of those 129, 57 had APS and VTE, 32 had VTE without aPLA, 32 had aPLA, and 8 were healthy. Gene-expression profiles identify and predict individuals with APS from patients with VTE without aPLA. It is important to be able to predict APS and venous thrombosis because it will help with the management of the disease. This article was retracted because the other authors were unable to reproduce the data Potti cited.
"A Genomic Strategy to Refine Prognosis in Early-Stage Non–Small-Cell Lung Cancer"
This article was published in the New England Journal of Medicine. The patients of this study were in stage IB, II, or IIIA of non-small cell lung cancer. Many patients receive surgery, but the risk of relapse is high. Others receive toxic chemotherapy unnecessarily. This study used gene-expressions to evaluate what form of treatment would be best. This article was retracted by the authors because they could not reproduce the results from the article.
"An Integrated Approach to the Prediction of Chemotherapeutic Response in Patients with Breast Cancer"
This article was published in PLOS One. It is important for cancer patients to receive the most effective treatment while also hopefully having the best quality of life possible. The researchers developed mRNA and microRNA profiles. They tested the mRNA profiles on 133 breast cancer patients. These breast cancer patients had been treated with TFAC chemotherapy treatment. This article was retracted as some of the information used in it derived from the Nature Medicine article which had been retracted. As that article had been retracted, it was felt that this article should be, as well.
"An Integrated Genomic-Based Approach to Individualized Treatment of Patients With Advanced-Stage Ovarian Cancer"
This paper was published in the Journal of Clinical Oncology in February 2007. The research studied ovarian cancer patient responses to platinum-based therapy. This marks the latest in a series of about 13 expected Potti retractions, with another 13 expected partial retractions.
"Characterizing the Clinical Relevance of an Embryonic Stem Cell Phenotype in Lung Adenocarcinoma"
This paper was published in Clinical Cancer Research on 15 December 2009. The study purportedly found a common gene expression pattern between lung adenocarcinomas and normal human embryonic stem cells that was associated with a shorter survival of patients with the lung cancer. On 21 February 2012, the manuscript was retracted. The retraction statement was signed by all authors and indicated "that clinical information from a data set ... available at the time of the signature development, was incorrect". Further, that statement indicated that "Drs. Anil Potti and Marvaretta Stevenson take full responsibility for this error".
"Upregulated Oncogenic Pathways in Patients Exposed to Tobacco Smoke May Provide a Novel Approach to Lung Cancer Chemoprevention"
Published in the journal Chest, this paper was retracted in 2012 with the retraction notice stating, "The authors relied on the results reported by Potti, and they were not aware of the errors subsequently reported."

=== Paper under suspicion ===
"Age- and Sex-Specific Genomic Profiles in Non-Small Cell Lung Cancer"
This paper was published in the Journal of the American Medicine Association (JAMA). This study, conducted at Duke University from July 2008 until June 2009, investigated age and gender influence on response to cancer by studying the genes of 787 non-small cell lung cancer patients. The article is under review but has not been retracted as of February 2012.

== See also ==
- List of scientific misconduct incidents
