= Elisa Albert =

American author

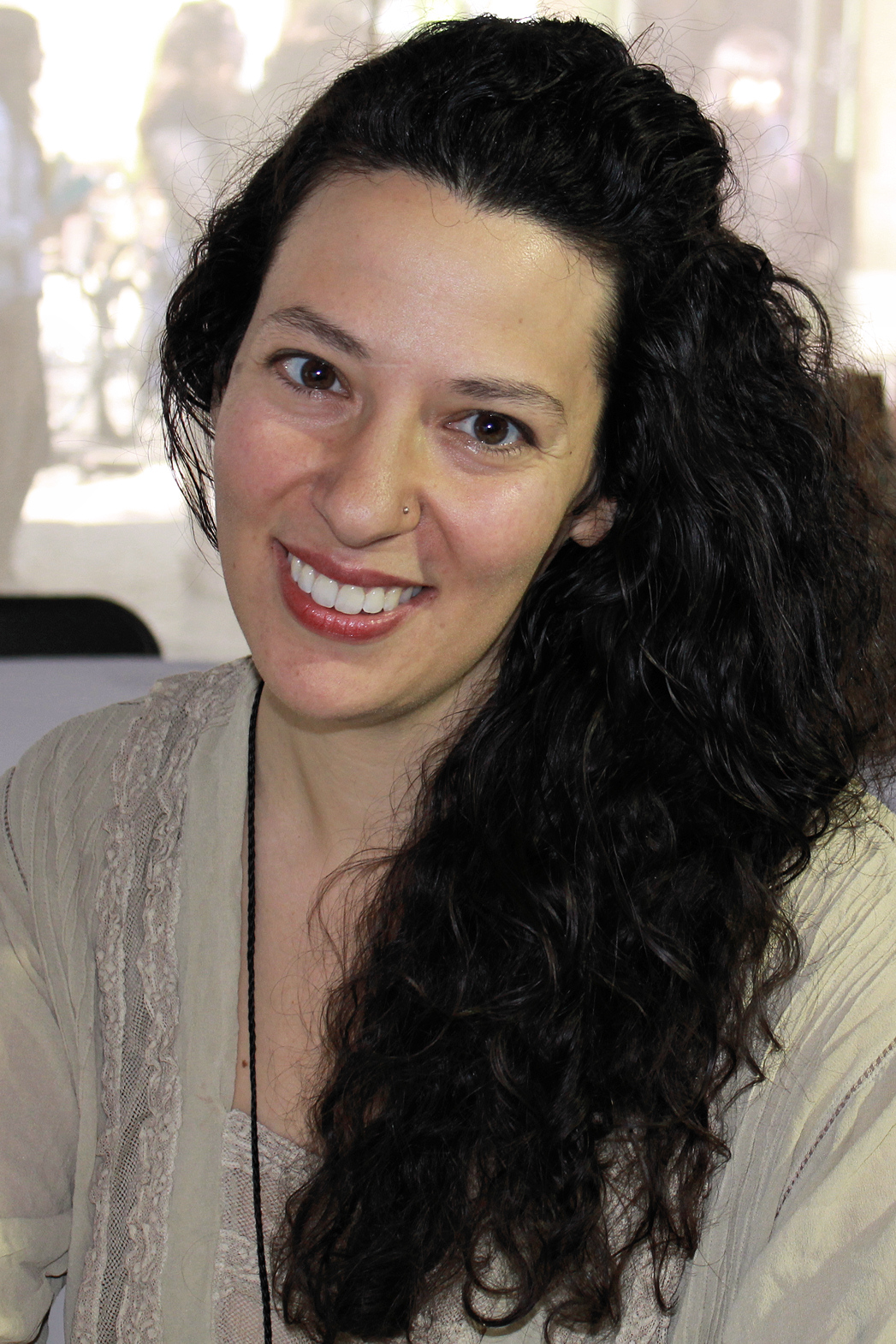
- Albert at the 2015 Texas Book Festival
- Born: July 2, 1978 (age 48); Los Angeles, California, U.S.
- Occupations: Novelist, essayist
- Writing career
- Period: 2006–present
- Genre: Literary fiction
- Website: www.elisaalbert.com

Elisa Albert (born July 2, 1978) is the author of the short story collection How this Night is Different (Free Press, 2006), the novels The Book of Dahlia (Free Press, 2008), After Birth (Houghton Mifflin Harcourt, 2015), and Human Blues (Avid Reader, 2022), and an anthology, Freud's Blind Spot: Writers on Siblings (Free Press, 2010).

Albert is a recipient of the Moment Magazine Emerging Writer Awards, given to a writer whose work deals with themes that would be of interest to Jewish readers. In 2009, she was a finalist for the Sami Rohr Prize.

Her fiction and non-fiction have appeared in Tin House, Post Road, Gulf Coast, Commentary, Salon, Tablet, Los Angeles Review of Books, The Believer, The Rumpus, Time, and on NPR.

== Early life ==
Albert was raised in an observant Jewish home with two older brothers in Los Angeles. She attended Westlake School for Girls and later Harvard-Westlake School, where she wrote a column for the school newspaper called "Phat Albert". She studied creative writing and women's studies at Brandeis University. She received her MFA from Columbia University in 2004.

Albert has taught creative writing at Columbia University's School of the Arts, and the College of Saint Rose in Albany. She received a residency at the Netherlands Institute for Advanced Study in 2010.

== Books ==
=== How this Night is Different (2006) ===
Albert's first book, How this Night is Different, for which she was awarded the Moment Magazine Emerging Writer Award, is a collection of stories published by Free Press in 2006. Publishers Weekly said, "these 10 stories by debut writer Albert explore traditional Jewish rituals with youthful, irreverent exuberance as her characters transition into marriage and child-rearing." A reviewer in Lilith magazine wrote, "Even if Elisa Albert had not chosen to end her collection with a love letter to Philip Roth, one could read her audacious debut as just that."

=== The Book of Dahlia (2008) ===
Her first novel, The Book of Dahlia, was published in 2008 by Free Press and was a finalist for the Sami Rohr Prize. Karen Russell praises Albert, saying, "Albert writes about a twenty-nine year old woman dying of brain cancer, structuring the book around the cheesy aphorisms from a self-help guide, and if that set-up doesn't sound like an obvious source of comedy, you've got to watch Albert at work." The New Yorker said, "Albert writes with the black humor of Lorrie Moore and a pathos that is uniquely her own, all the more blistering for being slyly invoked." Entertainment Weekly selected the book as one of the ten best novels of 2008 and said, "What begins as a darkly funny novel develops quickly into a genuine tragedy, though it's unlike any you've read before."

=== Freud's Blind Spot (2010) ===
In 2010, Albert edited Freud's Blind Spot, an anthology of essays by other writers on the subject of sibling relationships. It was published in 2010 by Free Press. Contributing writers included Etgar Keret, Joey Soloway, Steve Almond, Victor LaValle, Peter Orner, Lauren Grodstein, Rebecca Wolff, and Joanna Hershon.

=== After Birth (2015) ===
In February 2015, Houghton Mifflin Harcourt published Albert's second novel, After Birth. Publishers Weekly praised Albert, saying she, "applies a blistering tone to modern motherhood in this cri de coeur of a novel ... In lesser hands, Ari might be unlikable, but Albert imbues her with searing honesty and dark humor, and the result is a fascinating protagonist for this rich novel." Via Twitter, Emily Gould declared, "This book takes your essay about 'likable female characters,' writes FUCK YOU on it in menstrual blood, then sets it on fire."

=== Human Blues (2022) ===
Albert's third novel, Human Blues, was published by Avid Reader Press in July 2022. Exploring such themes as the music industry, fertility treatments, and fame, it was called "explosively hip, funny and heartfelt" by the New York Times and "a Bellow-worthy wave of blistering prose" by Publishers Weekly (starred review). Publishers Weekly ultimately named it one of the top ten works of fiction published in 2022.

=== The Snarling Girl (2024) ===
A collection of essays by Albert, published in magazines and literary journals between 2012 and 2022, was put out by Clash Books as their lead title, in hardcover.

== Other writing ==
Albert has contributed essays to several anthologies, including The Modern Jewish Girl's Guide to Guilt, Sugar In My Bowl, Click: When We Knew We Were Feminists, How To Spell Chanukkah, Body Outlaws, and Goodbye to All That: Writers on Loving and Leaving New York.

Her fiction and non-fiction have appeared in Tin House, Post Road, Gulf Coast, Commentary, Salon, Tablet, Los Angeles Review of Books, The Believer, The Rumpus, Time, and on NPR.

Albert (along with Jennifer Block) wrote a spirited feminist defense of Goop, the wellness and lifestyle company founded by Gwyneth Paltrow, in which she wrote that criticizing Goop is "a classic patriarchal devaluation." Sheadded, "It’s condescending to suggest that if we are interested in having agency over our bodies, if we are open to experiencing heightened states of awareness and emotion, if we are amazed by and eager to learn more about the possibilities of touch and intention and energy, and if we’d like to do everything within our power to stay out of doctors’ offices, we are somehow privileged morons who deserve an intellectual (read: patriarchal) beat-down."

== Albany Book Festival controversy ==
In 2024, Albert was due to appear on a literary panel at the Albany Book Festival (a program of the New York State Writers Institute) on the topic "Girls, Coming of Age," when two fellow panelists, Lisa Ko and Aisha Abdel Gawad, expressed concern over Albert's presence as a moderator. They cited social media posts and articles in which Albert characterized advocates of a ceasefire in the Gaza war as "terror apologists." Albert, who has personal ties to Israel, was vocal in her support for Israel in the wake of the Gaza war Festival organizers decided to cancel the event.

Albert defended her position on WAMC Northeast Public Radio: "I stand by all of it...My position on the war is war is very bad and I think wars should end. I am against war. I don't think anyone should start them. I don't think anyone should try to annihilate another people. I was in Israel on Oct. 7, I have personal lived experience, I have personal grief and trauma. Whether or not that's beside the point, I don't know. This war is a travesty, this conflict is a travesty."

An open letter in support of Ko and Gawad, organized by Viet Thanh Nguyen, calls on the New York State Writers Institute to a "full correction" for what they allege is "their mischaracterization" of Ko and Gawad's position. As of February 2025, the Institute has not responded to the letter and given no indications it is planning to do in the future.
