= Paulo Henriques Britto =

Brazilian author (born 1951)

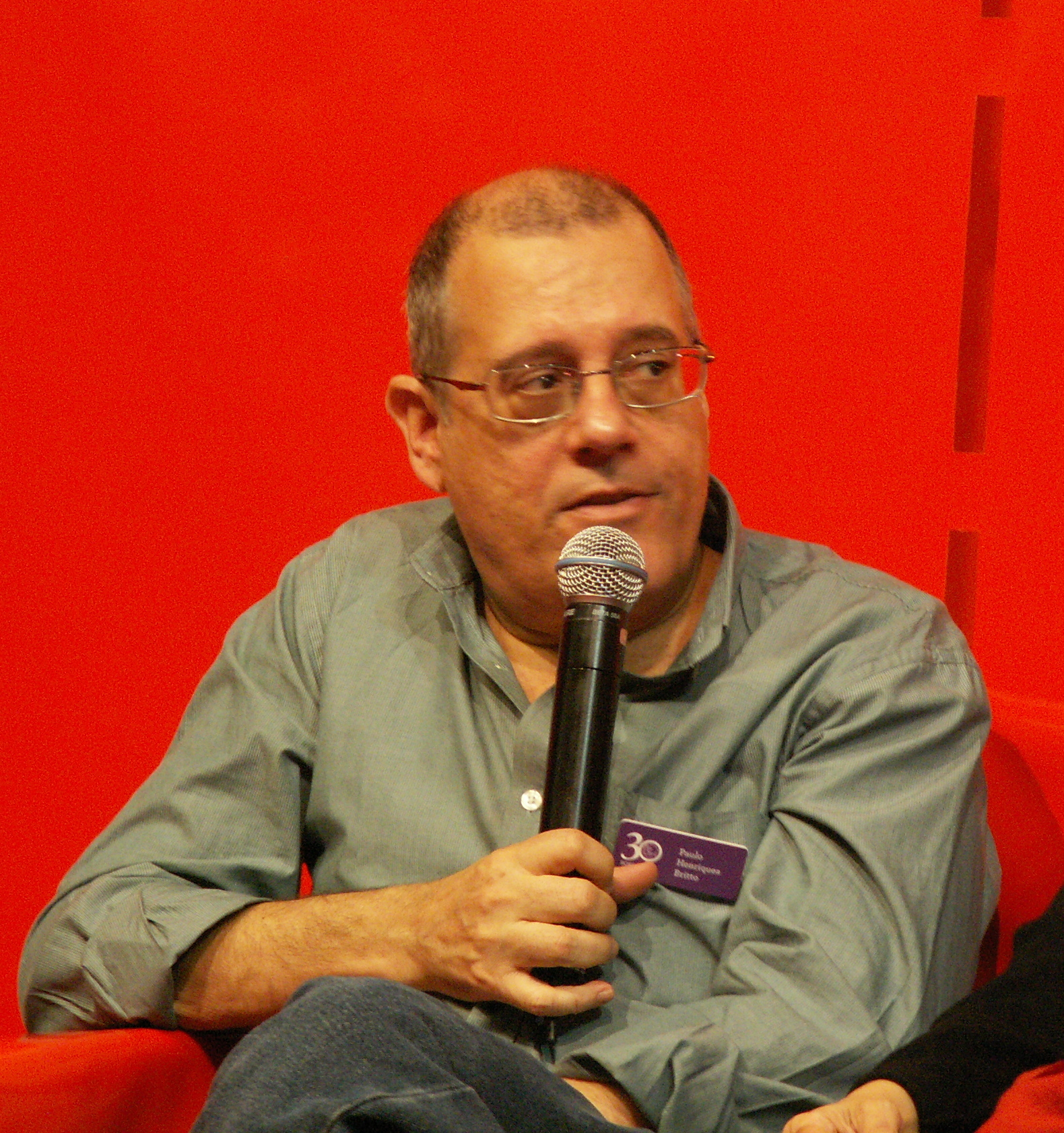
- Born: Rio de Janeiro
- Occupations: Translator, writer
- Website: www.phbritto.org

Paulo Henriques Britto (born 1951) is a Brazilian poet, translator and professor.

== Life ==
Paulo Henriques Britto was born in Rio de Janeiro, in a middle-class family. His father was a military officer. When he was 10 years old, his father was detached to the US, and his family moved to Washington, D.C, for two and a half years.

Later, Britto returned to the US to study film in Los Angeles and San Francisco, but never finished the studies. It was then he began writing poetry.

Britto graduated in Portuguese and English Literature at the Pontifical Catholic University of Rio de Janeiro in 1978 and got a master's degree in Languages in 1982 at the same university.

He debuted as a poet in 1982, with Liturgia da matéria, followed by Mínima Lírica (1989), Trovar Claro (1997), which was awarded the Prêmio Alphonsus de Guimarães by Biblioteca Nacional Foundation, and Macau (2003), which was awarded the Prêmio Portugal Telecom de literatura brasileira. In 2004 he wrote the short story book Paraísos Artificiais and in 2007 he wrote Tarde, followed by Formas do nada, in 2012.

He translated over one hundred books to Portuguese, by authors such as William Faulkner, Elizabeth Bishop, Byron, John Updike, Thomas Pynchon and Charles Dickens.

Britto is also an associate professor at the Pontifical Catholic University of Rio de Janeiro in translation, creative writing, and Brazilian literature courses.

On 22 May 2025, Brito was elected to the Brazilian Academy of Letters.

== Works ==
=== Poetry ===
- 1982 – Liturgia da matéria
- 1989 – Mínima lírica
- 1997 – Trovar claro
- 2003 – Macau
- 2007 – Tarde
- 2009 – Eu quero é botar meu bloco na rua
- 2012 – Formas do nada
- 2018 – Nenhum Mistério
- 2022 - Fim de Verão

==== Works translated into English ====
- 2007 – The Clean Shirt of It (translated by Idra Novey, BOA Editions, ISBN 978-1929918942)

=== Short stories ===
- 2004 – Paraísos artificiais
- 2021 – O castiçal florentino

=== Non-fiction ===
- 2012 – A tradução literária
