= The Cancer Letter =

American weekly publication

- Type: Weekly
- Format: newsletter
- Owner: The Cancer Letter Inc.
- Founder: Jerry D. Boyd
- Publisher: Paul Goldberg
- Editor: Paul Goldberg
- Founded: December 21, 1973; 52 years ago
- Language: English
- City: Washington, D.C.
- Country: United States
- ISSN: 0096-3917
- Website: cancerletter.com

The Cancer Letter is an American weekly publication that covers cancer research, drug development, legislation and health care policy. It was founded in Reston, Virginia by Jerry D. Boyd and first published on December 21, 1973. Based in Washington D.C., The Cancer Letter has won awards from journalistic associations, including the National Press Club and the Society of Professional Journalists. Paul Goldberg serves as editor and publisher since 2011. The Cancer Letter has over 200 institutional subscribers in the U.S. and abroad, covering approximately 150,000 readers in oncology.

== History ==
The Cancer Letter was first published as The Cancer Newsletter on December 21, 1973, by the National Information Service, Inc., Jerry D. Boyd, President, in Reston, Virginia, two years after Congress passed the National Cancer Act of 1971. On January 3, 1975, the publication name was changed to The Cancer Letter, Jerry D. Boyd, editor, published by The Cancer Letter, Inc. In 1979, The Cancer Letter, Inc. began distribution of a second publication, The Clinical Cancer Letter. Jerry Boyd's daughter, Kirsten Boyd, met Paul Goldberg in 1981 when the two of them were working at a small newspaper in Reston, Virginia. They married a few years later, and began working for The Cancer Letter. In 1989, Kirsten Boyd Goldberg became an associate editor of The Cancer Letter. In 1990, Kirsten Goldberg became the editor of The Cancer Letter, and Jerry Boyd assumed the position of contributing editor until his retirement from the publication in 1995. Paul Goldberg became associate editor in 1992, then editor in 1994, alongside Kirsten Boyd Goldberg, who also served as publisher. Kirsten Boyd Goldberg passed the publication and editorial mantle to Paul Goldberg in 2011.

In 2017, The Clinical Cancer Letter was rolled into The Cancer Letter as a weekly section, increasing the publication's clinical coverage. In a letter from the editor announcing the change, Editor Paul Goldberg wrote, "The Cancer Letter was calibrated for academics; The Clinical Cancer Letter for community physicians. It's no longer useful—or, for that matter, feasible—to delineate policy news from the clinical. Oncology has become one big story, a machine of many moving parts."

The Cancer Letter's founding editor, Jerry D. Boyd, died on September 24, 2019.

== Content ==
The Cancer Letter's coverage varies from week to week, depending on the issues of importance in the cancer field at the time, and typically include sections covering FDA news, NCI news, cancer centers, cooperative groups, professional societies, medicare, funding opportunities, philanthropy, guest editorials and "In Brief" summarizations of events and personnel appointments.

=== Reputation and awards ===
According to The New York Times on May 29, 2001, "The Cancer Letter, a weekly, gave early voice to the patient activist movement, helped force out an unpopular Clinton administration health official, exposed a society doctor whose cancer treatments may have cost lives and recently revealed — much to the embarrassment of American Cancer Society officials — that they had unwittingly hired two public relations firms with ties to the tobacco industry."

Of Paul Goldberg, the current editor and publisher of The Cancer Letter, The New York Times article stated "everybody who's anybody in cancer reads his stories."

Scientific journals, such as Nature and Science, have reported on investigations carried out by staff of The Cancer Letter. For example, The Cancer Letter reported extensively on problems between the MD Anderson Cancer Center and the Texas state taxpayer-funded Cancer Prevention and Research Institute of Texas (CPRIT), based in Austin, after MD Anderson president Ronald DePinho "launched a drug-discovery center, the Institute for Applied Cancer Science (IACS), where his wife, Lynda Chin, was appointed chief scientist" [Nature News, June 14, 2012] and "[t]he renovation of an office for Lynda Chin, the wife of the president of the University of Texas MD Anderson Cancer Center in Houston, Ronald DePinho, may have cost as much as $2 million, according to an analysis by a Washington, D.C., investigative newsletter." [Science News, May 24, 2013]

The Cancer Letter has received numerous awards for reporting on issues such as mammography screening, dietary supplements, industry conflicts of interest, including the ImClone scandal, and medical device hazards.

=== Web presence ===
The Cancer Letter maintains a website for distribution of its newsletters, publication of occasional special interest articles, and dissemination of a collection of documents associated with articles in the newsletter.

== Coverage issues ==
=== ImClone ===
Reports on findings of the investigational monoclonal antibody Erbitux began appearing in The Cancer Letter in November 2001. Erbitux was in development as a cancer therapeutic drug by the pharmaceutical company ImClone Systems, Inc. Paul Goldberg documented the missteps in FDA filings by ImClone that led to the failure to secure proper licensing for the drug and the subsequent precipitous drop in the value of ImClone stock. ImClone shareholders then filed class action lawsuits against the company. Though not covered by The Cancer Letter, the ImClone scandal included the episode of insider stock trading that resulted in a 5-month prison term for media celebrity Martha Stewart.

=== Duke University Genomics ===
Reporting by The Cancer Letter was key in bringing the spotlight to problems within a Duke University cancer research group producing problematic research results, as reported by the CBS investigative journalist show 60 Minutes on March 5, 2012: "Many trusted [Dr. Anil Potti] because Dr. Potti's work had been vindicated. But there was just one more thing - discovered, not by a scientist, but by Paul Goldberg, the editor of a small independent newsletter called 'The Cancer Letter.' Goldberg got a tip from a confidential source: check Dr. Potti's Rhodes scholarship. It was right there on his applications for federal grants. Trouble was it wasn't true." The Duke research group had eleven scientific journal articles retracted, seven others corrected, and one partially retracted. CBS News, 60 Minutes won a Peabody award for the reporting.
