= Tehran Children =

Book about Jewish children who fled to Iran during the Holocaust

- First edition
- Author: Mikhal Dekel
- Publisher: W. W. Norton & Company
- Publication date: 2019

Tehran Children: A Holocaust Refugee Odyssey is a book by Mikhal Dekel published in 2019. In it Dekel reconstructs her father Hannan's journey as a child refugee fleeing Nazi-occupied Poland during the Holocaust and World War II. Hannan was one of nearly 1,000 child refugees who travelled from Central Asia to the Middle East as they fled the conflict in the aftermath of the amnesty for Polish citizens in the Soviet Union which allowed for a large scale evacuation of Polish civilians from the USSR accompanying the Polish Anders' Army. The book includes archival research, memoir, and travel reportage from Poland, Russia, Uzbekistan, Iran and Israel.

The New York Times wrote that the experiences of these children had been “little researched and reported” prior to Tehran Children. The book examines the “profound dislocations – geographical, familial, psychological – of the first stages of the German invasion of Poland,” leading to an exodus in which the children endured Soviet Gulags, the “starving regions of Communist Uzbekistan, until they found refuge in Iran." The Times noted “Tehran Children suggests pathways for further research into a wide range of topics,” including American Jewish leadership during World War II. the Jewish Agency in Palestine, Polish-Jewish relations, and Bukharan Jewish communities, along with questions about the psychology of survival. "'Tehran children [is] not simply another detail of the Holocaust but a matter of enduring existential, psychological and moral reflection."

Reviewers have drawn comparisons between the events recorded in Tehran Children and the experience of child refugees around the world through the present day. The Guardian writes: “what makes Dekel’s study so valuable is not just its assiduous detailing of one family’s fate during the second world war, but how it also makes us reflect on our current era, with its mass migrations of desperate people fleeing conflict and hardship only to meet inflamed nativism and the desire to shift responsibility for their fate from one country on to the next.”

Tehran Children is a finalist for the Sami Rohr Prize in 2020.
