= Benjamin Balint =

American-Israeli writer (born 1976)

- Born: 1976 (age 49–50)
- Occupations: Author, journalist, educator, and translator
- Writing career
- Notable awards: Sami Rohr Prize for Jewish Literature (2020)

Benjamin Balint (born 1976) is an American-Israeli author, journalist, educator, and translator. His 2018 book Kafka's Last Trial, which explores the fate of Franz Kafka's manuscripts, which Max Brod declined to follow Kafka's instructions to burn, won the 2020 Sami Rohr Prize for Jewish Literature.

== Writing career ==
Balint was assistant editor for Commentary magazine. He contributes regularly to The Wall Street Journal, Die Zeit, Haaretz, The Weekly Standard, and the Claremont Review of Books. A documentary film directed by Eliran Peled, titled Kafka's Last Trial and based on the book, was released in 2025, with Balint one of the speakers who appears in it.

Balint's 2018 book Kafka's Last Trial narrates the journey of Kafka's manuscripts from Czechoslovakia to the National Library of Israel. For this work, Balint was awarded the 2020 Sami Rohr Prize for Jewish Literature. The book was also a finalist for the 2020 Wingate Literary Prize.

Balint's 2023 book, Bruno Schulz: An Artist, a Murder, and the Hijacking of History, won the National Jewish Book Award in the Biography category.

Balint was a fellow at the Hudson Institute and Van Leer Jerusalem Institute.

== Personal life ==
Balint lives in Jerusalem.

== Bibliography ==
- Balint, Benjamin (2010). Running Commentary: The Contentious Magazine That Transformed the Jewish Left Into the Neoconservative Right. PublicAffairs. ISBN 978-1586487492.
- Balint, Benjamin (2018). Kafka's Last Trial: The Strange Case of a Literary Legacy. New York: Pan Macmillan. ISBN 9781324001317. Also published by W. W. Norton & Company as Kafka's Last Trial: The Case of a Literary Legacy.
- Mack, Merav; Balint, Benjamin (May 14, 2019). Jerusalem: City of the Book. Yale University Press. ISBN 9780300222852.
- Balint, Benjamin (2023). Bruno Schulz: An Artist, a Murder, and the Hijacking of History. W. W. Norton & Company. ISBN 9780393866575.
