= Manoel de Barros =

Brazilian poet

Manoel Wenceslau Leite de Barros (December 19, 1916 – November 13, 2014) was a Brazilian poet. He won many awards for his work, including twice the Prêmio Jabuti (the "Tortoise Prize"), the most important literary award in Brazil.

Barros was born in Cuiabá, and is regarded by critics as one of the great names of contemporary Brazilian poetry, and by many authors he has been considered the greatest living poet from Brazil. The poet Carlos Drummond de Andrade recognized Manoel de Barros as Brazil's greatest poet.

In 1998 the poet was rewarded with the "National prize of Literature of the Ministry of the Culture from Brazil", for the set of the work. He died at age 97, in Campo Grande.

== Bibliography ==
Portuguese

- 1937—Poemas concebidos sem pecado
- 1942—Face imóvel
- 1956—Poesias
- 1960—Compêndio para uso dos pássaros
- 1966—Gramática expositiva do chão
- 1974—Matéria de poesia
- 1982—Arranjos para assobio
- 1985—Livro de pré-coisas
- 1989—O guardador das águas - Prêmio Jabuti de Literatura (Tortoise Prize) 1990.
- 1990—Poesia quase toda
- 1991—Concerto a céu aberto para solos de aves
- 1993—O livro das ignorãças - Prize Alfonso Guimarães of the National Library from Brazil.
- 1996—Livro sobre nada - Prize Nestlé of Brazilian Literature 1997, Category: Poetry.
- 1998—Retrato do artista quando coisa
- 1999—Exercícios de ser criança
- 2000—Ensaios fotográficos
- 2001—O fazedor de amanhecer [Children's literature] - Prêmio Jabuti (Tortoise Prize) de Literatura 2002.
- 2001—Poeminhas pescados numa fala de João
- 2001—Tratado geral das grandezas do ínfimo
- 2003—Memórias inventadas (A infância)
- 2003—Cantigas para um passarinho à toa
- 2004—Poemas rupestres - Prize Nestlé of Brazilian Literature 2006.
- 2005—Memórias inventadas II (A segunda infância)
- 2007—Memórias inventadas III (A terceira infância)

== Translated editions ==
German

- 1996—Das Buch der Unwissenheiten

French

- 2003—La Parole sans Limites. Une Didactique de lInvention

Spanish

- 2002 - Todo lo que no invento es falso
- 2005 - Riba del dessemblat

English

- 2010 - Birds for a Demolition (translated by Idra Novey, Carnegie Mellon University Press)
