= Mikhal Dekel =

Israeli-born author and professor of the United States

- Born: Haifa, Israel
- Occupations: Author, Professor of literature

Academic background
- Education: Buchman School of Law; Tel Aviv University (LLB); City College of New York (MA); Columbia University (PhD)
- Website: mikhaldekel.com

Mikhal Dekel is an Israeli-born author and professor of literature based in the United States, specializing in the theory of migrations, historical memoir, representations of trauma, and the overlap between law and literature. She teaches English and Comparative Literature at City College New York (CCNY) and the City University of New York (CUNY) Graduate Center, and directs CCNY's Rifkind Center for the Humanities and Arts

Dekel is the author of Tehran Children: A Holocaust Refugee Odyssey, The Universal Jew: Masculinity, Modernity and the Zionist Movement, and the Hebrew monograph Oedipus be-Kishinev (Oedipus in Kishinev). Dekel has also published articles on topics such as George Eliot's Hebrew translations, tragedy and revenge in Hebrew literature, and autism and the English novel. Her scholarly work has received support from the National Endowment of the Arts, the Mellon Foundation, and the Lady Davis Foundation, among others.

== Early life and education ==
Mikhal Dekel was born in Haifa, Israel, to Hannan and Zipora Dekel (Teitel). As an Israeli citizen, Mikhal Dekel completed her mandatory military service and went on to earn an L.L.B. from Tel Aviv University's Buchmann School of Law and intern at the Tel Aviv State Attorney's Office. Dekel is a member of the Israel Bar Association. She moved to New York and entered a graduate program in English at the City College of New York. She then completed a Ph.D. in Comparative Literature at Columbia University.

== Tehran Children ==
In 2019, Dekel published Tehran Children, which reconstructs her father Hannan's journey as a child refugee fleeing Nazi-occupied Poland during World War II. Hannan was one of nearly 1,000 child refugees who travelled from Central Asia to the Middle East as they fled the conflict. The book includes archival research, memoir, and travel reportage from Poland, Russia, Uzbekistan, Iran and Israel.

== Other Writing ==
Dekel's previous book in English, The Universal Jew, examines literary depictions of Jewish Nationhood and citizenship during the Zionist movement's formative period in the late nineteenth-century. It shows how literary works by Theodor Herzl, George Eliot, Hayim Nahman Bialik and others were shaped by, and also helped shape a new political reality and Jewish identity.

Her articles have appeared in Foreign Policy, The Cambridge Review of International Affairs, Guernica, and other print and online publications.
