= Sara Yael Hirschhorn =

American Professor of Israel Studies

Visiting Assistant Professor of Israel Studies at Northwestern University

Personal details
- Born: Longmeadow, Massachusetts
- Occupation: Scholar, historian, author

Sara Yael Hirschhorn is currently the visiting assistant professor of Israel studies at Northwestern University. She was formerly the university research lecturer and Sidney Brichto Fellow in Israel and Hebrew studies at the University of Oxford, historian and author. In May 2017, Harvard University Press published her first book City on a Hilltop: American Jews and the Israeli Settler Movement. She began fieldwork for the book in 2008.

She is a contributor at the Tony Blair Institute for Global Change, as well as news publications such as The New York Times, Haaretz, The Times of Israel and Jewish Chronicle. She is considered an expert on Hilltop Youth.

== Education ==
Hirschhorn holds a Bachelor of Arts degree in history from Yale University, as well as both a Master of Arts degree in Middle Eastern studies and a PhD in history from the University of Chicago.

== Career ==
In 2017, her research was published by The Atlantic, reporting that 60,000 out of 400,000 (roughly 15 percent) of settlers on Israel's West Bank are American.

In May 2017, Harvard University Press published Hirshhorn's first book City on a Hilltop: American Jews and the Israeli Settler Movement exploring the role of the approximately 60,000 liberal-leaning American Jews in settling the West Bank, particularly what Hirshhorn describes as "the clash between Jewish-American settlers' liberal personas and their illiberal project". The book is based on interdisciplinary literature review and Hirshhorns' field research in Israel. The book was positively reviewed in the Perspectives on Terrorism journal. A review in The American Historical Review wrote that "In an American Jewish historiography that now favors transnational approaches, City on a Hilltop delivers." In the Jerusalem Post, writer Ron Kronish states that "Hirschorn tackles the topic in a comprehensive, sophisticated and nuanced manner."

In 2018, she became the visiting assistant professor of Israel Studies at Northwestern University's Crown Family Center for Jewish and Israel Studies.

In 2019, Haaretz covered her research into American Jews' role in the US settler movement, including her analysis of Baruch Goldstein. Hirschhorn has mainly focused her research on Diaspora-Israel relations.

In 2022, Hirshhorn received a Center on Antisemitism Research fellowship from the Anti-Defamation League, which she planned to develop into a book about how anti-Zionism developed, in part, to disenfranchise Jews.

== Awards ==
In 2018, Hirschhorn was awarded silver medal (Choice Award) as runner-up to Ilana Kurshan in the Sami Rohr Prize for Jewish Literature, winning an $18,000 prize for City on a Hilltop.

== Selected publications ==
- City on a Hilltop: American Jews and the Israeli Settler Movement. Harvard University Press, 2017. ISBN 978-0674975057
