= 2023 Democratic National Committee protests =

2023 civil conflict in Washington, D.C., U.S.

2023 Democratic National Convention protests
- Part of the Gaza war protests in the United States
- Date: 15 November 2023 (6:40 pm to 10 pm)
- Location: Democratic National Committee, Washington, D.C., United States (N 38° 53' 2.6484", W 77° 0' 30.942")
- Caused by: Gaza war
- Goals: Ceasefire in Gaza; Establishment of a "Free Palestine"; End to American support of Israel's military
- Result: Protest suppressed; Evacuation of the DNC; South Capitol Street between Canal and E Streets, SE. and Ivy Street between Canal Street and New Jersey Avenue, SE are closed off

Parties
Protesters: Pro-Palestine protesters; IfNotNow; Jewish Voice for Peace	Security forces: United States Capitol Police; Democratic Party

Lead figures
Unknown	(United States) Hakeem Jeffries (United States) Suzan DelBene

Number
150 protesters	Unknown number of Capitol Police officers

Casualties and losses
90-100 protesters injured At least 1 protester arrested 1 protester charged with assault	6 injured

Casualties
- Injuries: 90 protesters
- Arrested: At least 1 protester
- Charged: 1 protester charged with assault

The 2023 Democratic National Committee protests were a pro-Palestine protest turned violent. The protest organizers, the Jewish Voice for Peace and the IfNotNow movement as well as other Pro-Palestinian protesters arrived outside the DNC building on 430 South Capitol St. SE at 6:40 pm after a candlelight vigil at 3rd Street and Maryland Avenue SW. The protest forced Capitol Police to shut down several roads in the area as officers tried to deal with the protesters.

The protests also showed a clear divide within the Democratic Party over the Gaza war and a clear divide within U.S. President Joe Biden's voter base.

== Protest ==
The protests started on 15 November 2023 at around 6:40pm, the protesters went to the DNC building on 430 South Capitol St. SE and blocked the entrances to the DNC while Democratic representatives and candidates, including House Minority Leader Suzan DelBene, the chairwoman of the Democratic Congressional Campaign Committee, House Minority Leader Hakeem Jeffries and Michigan Representative Debbie Dingell were inside the building for a campaign reception. About 10 members were inside the headquarters at the time of the protest, and were meeting with House candidates who were in town for training and connections. The protesters were chanting Pro-Palestinian slogans and wore black shirts that read "Cease Fire Now". The protestors called for a ceasefire in Gaza, an end to American military support to Israel, and the establishment of a "Free Palestinian State".

As the protest continued, Capitol Police arrived on scene and shut down multiple roads in order to try and contain the situation. At 8:38 pm ET they said that: "Right now our officers are working to keep back approximately 150 people who are illegally and violently protesting in the area of Canal Street and Ivy Street, SE. Officers are making arrests. All Members have been evacuated from the area. Please stay away from the area". Videos on social media showed protesters trying to grab hold of metal barricades as the officers moved in to make arrests.

IfNotNow posted on X (formerly known as Twitter) that "police are being extremely violent." They also posted: "We are linking arms, threatening no one, and begging our politicians to support an end to the killing and the suffering in Gaza. Begging, peacefully, for a ceasefire". Capitol Police used pepper spray in an attempt to disperse the crowd. Fist fights were also seen on videos posted to social media. According to Capitol Police, an officer reportedly witnessed a protester "slam another officer into a garage door and then punched the female officer in the face." Inside the Democratic headquarters, police rushed into the reception and directed lawmakers to the basement, according to California democratic representative Brad Sherman, some people were later evacuated in police vehicles. By 10 pm, the Capitol Police said that all house buildings had returned to normal operations.

== Aftermath ==
On 16 November 2023 IfNotNow claimed on their X account that 90 protesters were injured and posted a video from the protests. The Washington Post reported that at least 100 protesters had suffered injuries after being pepper-sprayed and pushed by police. At least 1 protester was arrested and other 1 protester, a 24 year old from New York was charged with assault on an officer. Officers later indicated that they were not more arrests as they were working to hold the police line. Politico compared the protests to the 1968 Democratic National Convention protests.

== Response ==
Representative Brad Sherman (D-CA) posted on social media that he had been evacuated from the DNC "after pro-terrorist, anti-#Israel protesters" became violent and assaulted police officers. IfNotNow claimed that their actions were peaceful and the Capitol Police were the ones who were violent. Spokesperson Eva Borgwardt sited Shermans account in a statement, calling it inaccurate and that his comments were "dangerous and reckless". Democratic leadership released a statement said that "Protesters escalated their activity in a manner that exceeded a peaceful demonstration". The political director of Jewish Voice for Peace Action, Beth Miller stated that "hundreds of peaceful anti-war activists" had been met with "brutal assaults by the police" while calling on Democrats to decide what side of the conflict they stand on. American Muslim writer and civil rights scholar Omar Suleiman said on his X account: "Unbelievable. Capitol police throwing protestors shouting not in our name and calling for a ceasefire down the steps of the Democratic National Headquarters. Good luck in 2024 y’all".

President Joe Biden and first lady Jill Biden called into a DNC and campaign staff meeting on November 16 and expressed appreciation for law enforcement, and thanked staffers and offered holiday wishes for the upcoming Thanksgiving holiday.
