= Abigail Green =

British historian

- Born: 12 May 1971 (age 55)
- Occupations: Historian and academic
- Title: Professor of Modern European History
- Spouse: Boaz Brosh
- Children: 1

Academic background
- Education: University of Oxford (BA); University of Cambridge (PhD)

Academic work
- Discipline: History
- Sub-discipline: German history; Jewish history; German nationalism; Political history; History of Europe
- Institutions: St John's College, Cambridge; Brasenose College, Oxford

Abigail Frances Floretta Green (born 12 May 1971) is a British historian. She has been a Fellow of the Brasenose College, Oxford, since 2000, and in 2015 she was awarded the title Professor of Modern European History by the University of Oxford.

== Career ==
Green's mother was born into the Sebag-Montefiore family. Green completed her undergraduate degree (BA) at the University of Oxford, and then carried out her doctoral studies at the University of Cambridge; her PhD was awarded in 1999 for her thesis "Particularist state-building and the German question: Hanover, Saxony, Württemberg 1850–1866". She was elected to a Title A Research Fellowship at St John's College, Cambridge, in 1998, before being appointed a Fellow at Brasenose College, Oxford, in 2000. In 2015 she was awarded the title Professor of Modern European History by the University of Oxford.

Green specialises in the history of 19th-century Europe, nationalism and regionalism in Germany, Jewish internationalism, and liberalism.

== Honours and awards ==
Green was awarded the Sami Rohr Prize for Jewish Literature's silver medal in 2012 for her biography of Sir Moses Montefiore, which was also named one the New Republic's "Best Books of 2010", included among the Times Literary Supplement "Books of the Year", and a National Jewish Book Award finalist.

== Personal life ==
Green is married to Boaz Brosh, with whom she has a daughter. Their wedding took place at Bevis Marks Synagogue in London.

== Selected publications ==
- Coauthored with Peter Bergamin, "Vera Salomons and the Kotel: reading international Jewish history through a Jewish country house", Journal of Modern Jewish Studies, vol. 21, no. 2 (2022), pp. 261–271.
- "Humanitarianism in nineteenth-century context: religious, gendered, national", The Historical Journal, vol. 57, no. 4 (2014), pp. 1157–1175.
- "Spirituality, tradition and gender: Judith Montefiore, the very model of modern Jewish womanhood", History of European Ideas, vol. 40 (2014), pp. 747–760.
- "The limits of intervention: coercive diplomacy and the Jewish question in the nineteenth century", The International History Review, vol. 36, no. 3 (2014), pp. 473–492.
- (Edited with Vincent Viaene) Religious Internationals in the Modern World: Globalization and Faith Communities since 1750, Palgrave Transnational History series (Palgrave, 2012).
- Moses Montefiore: Jewish Liberator, Imperial Hero (The Belknap Press of Harvard University Press, 2010).
- "The British Empire and the Jews: an imperialism of human rights?", Past & Present, vol. 199 (2008), pp. 175–205.
- Fatherlands: State-building and Nationhood in Nineteenth Century Germany (Cambridge University Press, 2001).
