= Dov Alfon =

Israeli journalist and author (born 1961)

- דב אלפון
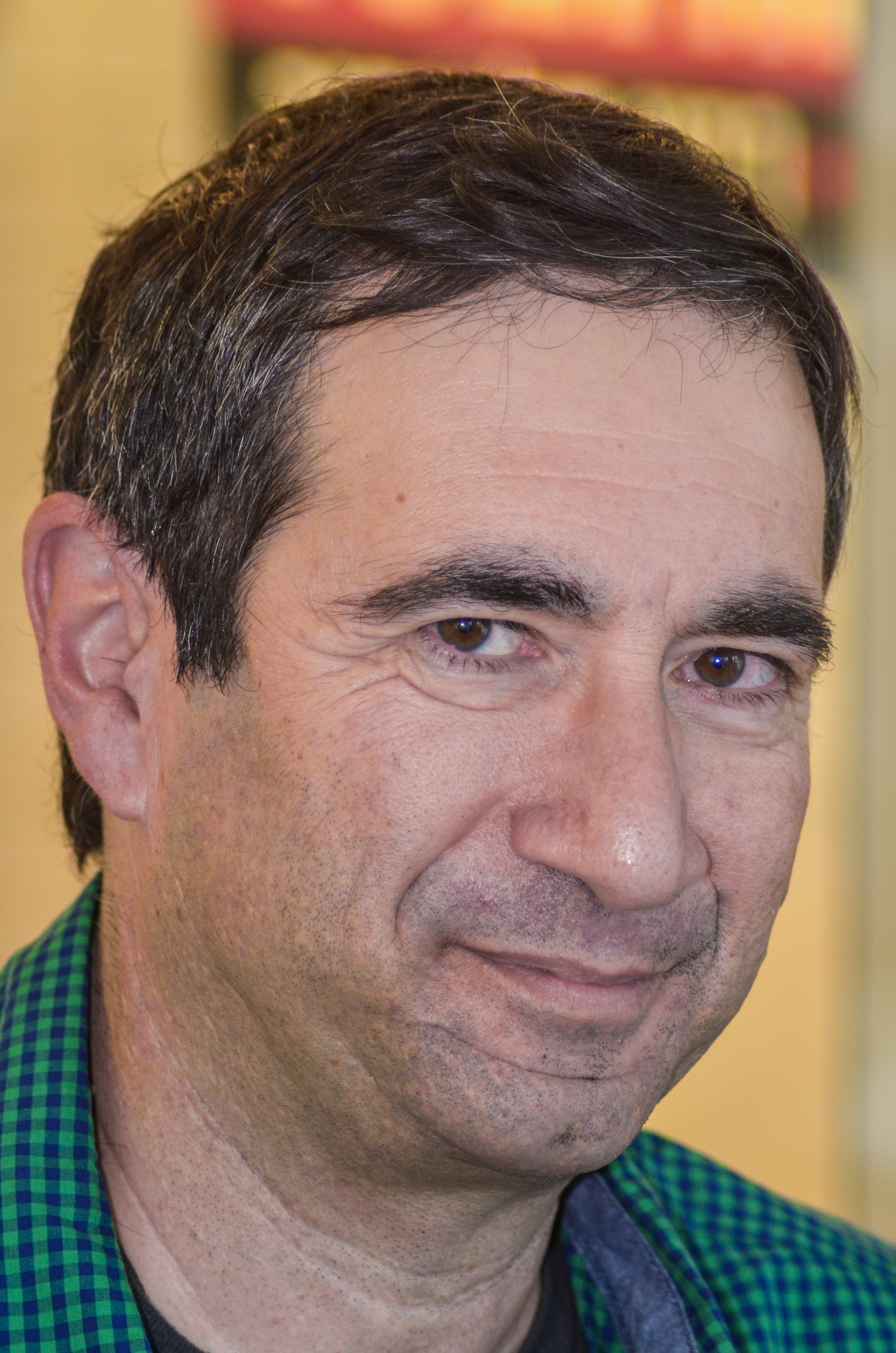
- Born: Tunisia
- Occupations: Journalist and editor

Dov Alfon (Hebrew: דב אלפון; born 1961) is an Israeli journalist and author residing in France. He was the chief editor of Kinneret Zmora-Bitan Dvir, Israel's largest publishing house. From 2008 to 2011, he was editor in chief of Haaretz, an Israeli newspaper. He is currently the CEO of Storyvid.io, a non-profit cultural venture aiming to bridge between literature and new media. He was also the editor in chief of Alaxon, a Hebrew digital journal for Science and the Arts.

On 16 September 2020, Dov Alfon was appointed editor-in-chief and head of editorial strategy of the French newspaper Libération.

== Biography ==
Dov Patrick Alfon was born in Sousse 1961. He grew up in Paris. He published his first short story at the age of nine in the comics weekly Spirou while attending the College Henry IV in the fifth arrondissement. On his 11th birthday, the family immigrated to Israel. They settled in Ashdod, where he studied at the Rogozin Makif Guimel secondary school. He later wrote about his childhood in a short autobiographical piece, "The Civilization Teacher." He did his military service in the technological intelligence unit of the IDF.

== Media career ==
In 1983, Alfon began writing for Pi Ha'aton, the student newspaper of the Hebrew University of Jerusalem. Less than a year later, he was invited by Tom Segev and Nahum Barnea to join a new journalistic venture, the political weekly Koteret Rashit.

Alfon joined Haaretz in 1989, where he wrote a weekly column, "Kivun Harouah", about the relations between culture and money. He was appointed editor of the cultural page in 1992, turning it to the daily section "Galleria". He launched several new journalistic formats for Haaretz along the years among them "Captain Internet", a weekly column supposedly written by a fictive grandfather investigating the new medium (1994), "The Marker Magazine", a business monthly (2001) and the re-designed Haaretz Weekend Magazine, where he was editor from 1992 to 1998.

Alfon was chief editor of the Kinneret Zmora-Bitan publishing house (2004–2008) and hosted "Nispah Tarbut", a weekly cultural show on Israel's Channel 2 television (2002–2007).

He was appointed editor in chief of Haaretz on May 1, 2008, serving in this position until 2011. In 2008, he published a special issue of the newspaper where leading authors replaced the newspaper reporters for a day. The experiment drew extensive coverage worldwide.

He was co-editor, with writer Etgar Keret, of a new international cultural venture aiming to mix literature and cinema in a new format.

In April 2013 Alfon became the founding editor of Alaxon, an online magazine in Hebrew, ending his tenure as its editor in chief in December 2014.

His debut thriller novel was published in English as A Long Night in Paris in 2019.

On 16 September 2020, Dov Alfon was appointed editor-in-chief and head of editorial strategy of the French newspaper Libération.

Alfron's A Long Night in Paris was adapted into a mini-TV series, titled State of Alert and starring Patrick Bruel, Tsahi Halevi, and Natacha Lindinger. The series is slated to premiere on TF1 in 2025.

== Condemnation for defamation ==
By judgment dated February 10, 2022, the Paris Criminal Court (17th chamber) condemned Dov Alfon, Director of publication of the newspaper Libération, for having publicly defamed Professor Jean-François Toussaint, known to relativize the seriousness of the COVID-19 pandemic in France.

== Awards and recognition ==
- Winner of the CWA International Dagger Award 2019
- Recipient of the Marianne award 2019 for the best thriller published in France that year.
- Recipient of the Peace Through Media Award 2011 from the International Council for Press and Broadcasting, London
- Jury chairman, Jerusalem Prize for the Freedom of the Individual in Society, 2009 (awarded to Haruki Murakami)
- Ophir Prize nominee for best TV Cultural show (with editor Irit Dolev), 2005, 2006, 2008
- Gold Medal in the magazine category from the American Illustrators Society (1997, with Israeli artist Hanoch Piven).
- Editor of the Year Award, the Israeli Press Association (1994, 1996)
