= An Event in Autumn =

2004 detective novel by Henning Mankell

An Event In Autumn
- Cover of Het Graf, the original Dutch edition of the Wallander story
- Author: Henning Mankell
- Original title: Het Graf
- Translator: Laurie Thompson
- Language: Dutch
- Series: Kurt Wallander
- Genre: Crime, Mystery novel
- Publisher: De Geus
- Publication date: 2004
- Publication place: The Netherlands
- English publication date: 2014
- Media type: Print (Hardcover, Paperback)
- Pages: 176 pp (Eng. hardback trans.)
- ISBN: 978-0-8041-7064-2 (Eng. trans.)
- Preceded by: The Pyramid
- Followed by: The Troubled Man

An Event In Autumn is a crime novel by Swedish author Henning Mankell. It is the twelfth installation in the Inspector Wallander series, which was made into the television series Wallander. It was translated by into English by Laurie Thompson in 2013, and published in August 2014 by Vintage Books. The novel follows Wallander as he attempts to solve the murder of two unknown people. The novella was originally published in Dutch in 2004 as Het Graf.

== Synopsis ==
=== Plot Summary ===
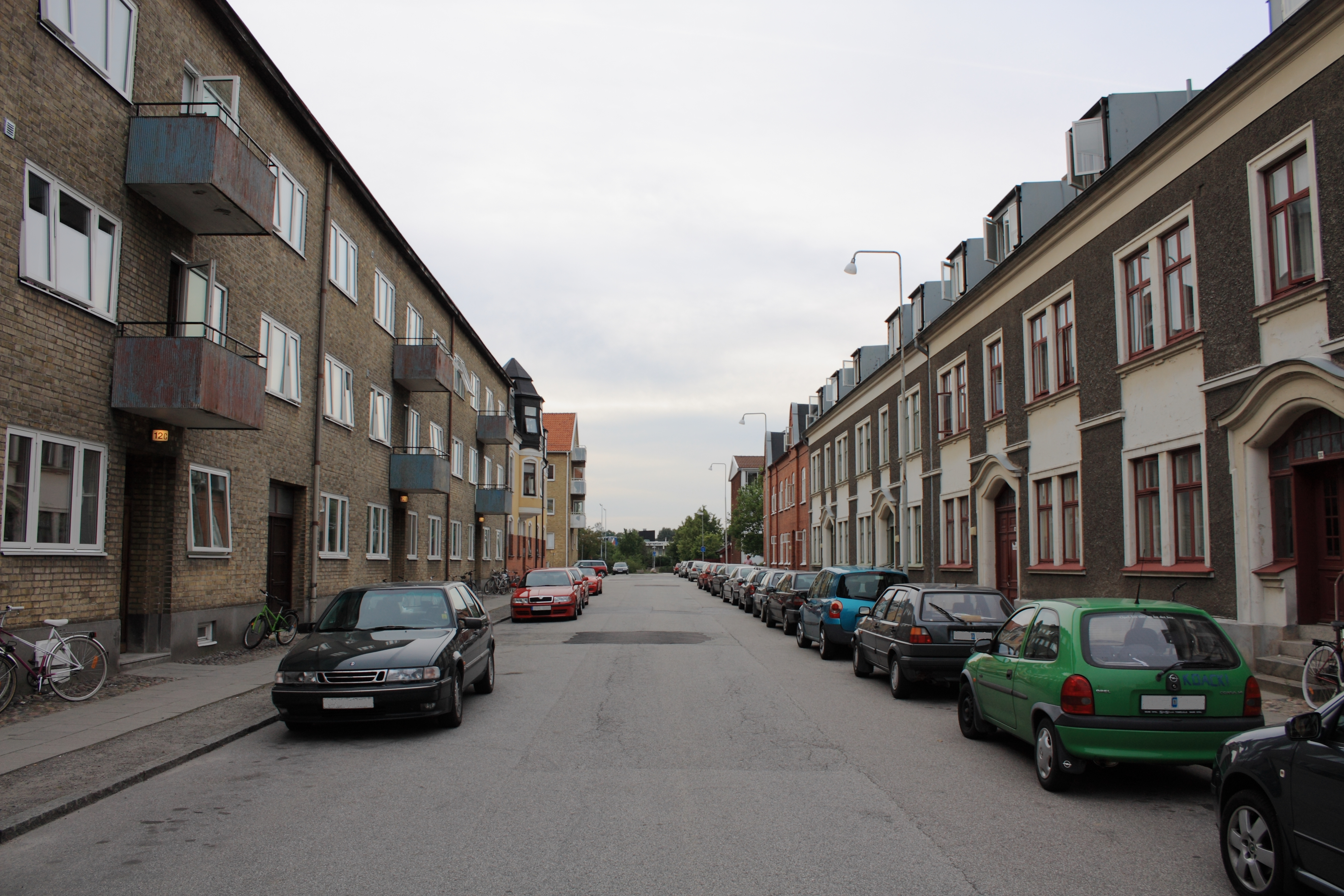
Mariagatan in Ystad, 2009. The fictional Detective Wallander is said to live here.

In the Swedish town of Ystad, aging Detective Kurt Wallander discovers a body when a skeletal hand surfaces in the garden of a house he is looking to buy. Forensics expert Stina Hurlén identifies the skeleton as having belonged to a woman of about fifty who had been hanged. After surveying the garden again, Wallander later discovers another skeleton, this one belonging to a man of around the same age as the first skeleton and who had been buried for the same amount of time. Wallander questions neighbors and dives into the records of the home to discover who was killed, when, and who the murderer was. During his investigation, he runs into a red herring, or misleading clue, that later assists in solving the case.

Wallander discovers that the murdered couple were travelers from Estonia who were said to have returned to Denmark after the end of World War II. Wallander’s investigation leads him to an elderly home where he meets the son of the Estonian travelers Ivar Pihlak, who had announced his parents' departure. After speaking to Pihlak, Wallander returns to the police station, where he later learns that Pihlak has gone missing. Wallander tracks him to the house where the bodies were uncovered, and is then assaulted and knocked out by Pihlak. After Wallander regains consciousness, Pihlak confesses: his father, a controlling man, murdered his mother. In retaliation, Pihlak killed his father. He buried both bodies in the backyard of the house he was staying in. Now fearful that he will be jailed for his crime, he attempts to shoot Wallander. However, Pihlak’s gun explodes in his hand, killing him and leaving Wallander shaken but unscathed.

=== Characters ===
An Event in Autumn primarily follows the members of the Ystad Police Department. This includes Kurt Wallander, his daughter Linda Wallander, Officer Martinson, the forensic pathologist Stina Hurlén, Officer Nyberg, Officer Stefan Lindman, and the chief of police, Lisa Holgersson. Other characters include Evert and Elin Trulsson, who are nearby neighbors, and Ivar Philak, a war refugee. Karl Eriksson, who currently owns the house, and Ludvig Hansson, who owned the house at the time of the murder, are mentioned.

=== Setting ===
An Event in Autumn is set primarily within the town of Ystad, in the province of Skåne, Sweden. Ystad had a population of 29,696 in the year 2017, while Skåne had a population of 1,340,415. Thus, while Skåne accounts for a large portion of Sweden’s overall population of 10,415,811 people, Ystad accounts for less than 0.3% of the Swedish population.

Ystad is a small town. Attractions include an art museum, the Ystad Theatre, and the Ystad Monastery, which serves as the town history museum. The newspapers referenced in the novel are most likely Ystads Allehanda, the only newspaper published in the town of Ystad.

== Historical Context ==
The murdered couple and their son were refugees from Estonia, fleeing World War II. This fact plays a large role in the investigation: Wallander had a hard time identifying the bodies because the family was not well-known in the town of Ystad, and they were not registered officially because they were refugees. Their disappearance was initially not investigated due to this status; the townsfolk did not realize they were missing or believed that they had truly returned to Denmark.

This novel brings to light the struggles faced by war refugees, especially in Sweden. The Pihlak family struggled to find work and housing, resulting in their stay with Hansson. Due to the massive displacement of people caused by World War II - an estimated 65 million Europeans - it was relatively easy for Ivar Pihlak to get away with his parents' murders, as disappearances were fairly common.

== Author ==
Henning Mankell (3 February 1948 – 5 October 2015) was a Swedish author, screenwriter, and playwright. His most notable works are from the Kurt Wallander book series, including An Event in Autumn. These books have been adapted into two different Swedish television series and one English television series produced by the BBC. Mankell was a left-wing political activist, and split his time between Sweden and Africa, most often Mozambique, where he opened and financially supported a local theater. The character of Kurt Wallander was created as a response to what Mankell saw as an increase in racist sentiment in Sweden. Mankell publicly announced that he had been diagnosed with cancer in 2014. He died on the 5th of October, 2015.

== Reception ==
An Event in Autumn released to mostly positive reviews, with critics praising the strong characterization and melancholy mood of the novel. They also lament this being the final novel focusing on Kurt Wallander.

Critics also mention the short length of the book, but most do not describe this as a negative aspect of the story. Kirkus Review claims that the length does not detract from the impact that Wallander has on the reader, and Alison Flood of The Guardian describes the book as a short but pleasant read. However, the review from Crime Fiction Lover does note that the briefness of the story reduces the potential for an interesting mystery.

== Adaptation ==
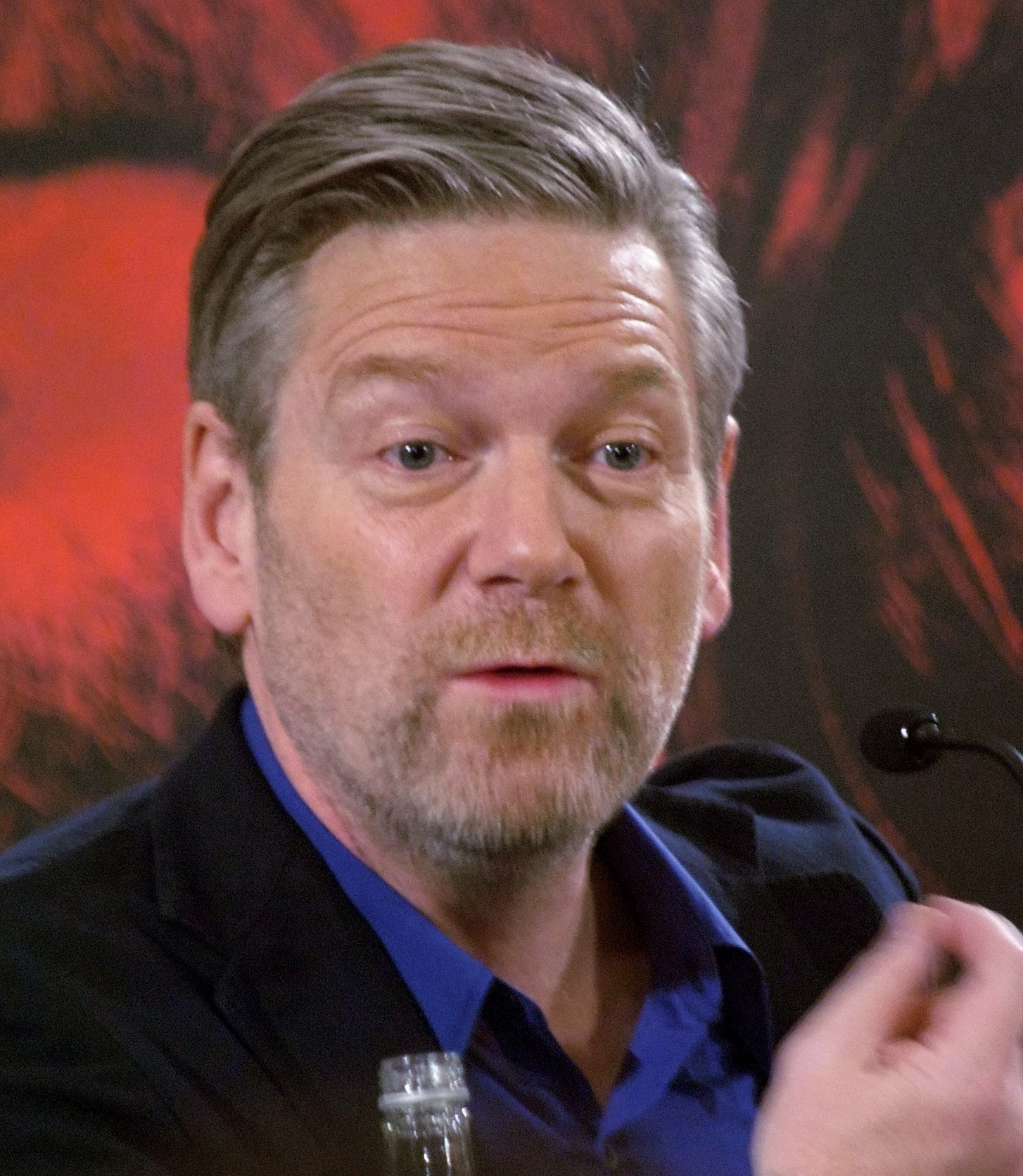
Kenneth Branagh played the Swedish detective in the Wallander limited series

The story was adapted into an episode of the English-language British television series Wallander, starring Kenneth Branagh and was aired in 2012. Because the episode was aired to English audiences prior to the release of the novella's English translation, some confusion was caused among fans that were unfamiliar with the source material.
