= Faceless Killers =

1991 novel by Henning Mankell

- First edition (Swedish)
- Author: Henning Mankell
- Original title: Mördare utan ansikte
- Translator: Steven T. Murray
- Language: Swedish
- Series: Kurt Wallander #1
- Genre: Crime novel
- Publisher: Ordfront
- Publication date: 1991
- Publication place: Sweden
- English publication date: 1997
- Media type: Print (hardcover, paperback)
- Pages: 288 pp (Eng. hardback trans.)
- ISBN: 1-86046-780-6 (Eng. trans.)
- OCLC: 43418392
- Followed by: The Dogs of Riga

Faceless Killers (Swedish: Mördare utan ansikte) is a 1991 crime novel by the Swedish writer Henning Mankell, and the first in his acclaimed Wallander series. The English translation by Steven T. Murray was published in 1997.

In 1992, Faceless Killers won the first ever Glass Key award, given to crime writers from the Nordic countries.

== Synopsis ==
Inside an almost isolated Skåne farmhouse in Lunnarp, an old man, Johannes Lövgren, is tortured to death and his wife Maria savagely beaten and left for dead with a noose around her neck. Inspector Kurt Wallander, a forty-two-year-old Ystad police detective, is put on the case with his team: Rydberg, an aging detective with rheumatism; Martinsson, a 29-year-old rookie; Naslund, a thirty-year veteran; Svedberg, a balding, forty-something-year-old detective; Hansson and Peters. Maria Lovgren is taken to hospital, but dies anyway. Her last word: "foreign".

Rydberg has been examining the noose around Mrs Lovgren's neck and "has never seen one like it before". He thinks that Mrs Lovgren's last word is accurate, and that the murderers are foreign. But his conclusion leads to several racially-motivated attacks after the information is leaked to the press.

== Overview ==
The novel focuses on Sweden's liberal attitude regarding immigration, and explores themes of racism and national identity in the wake of the refugee controversy in Sjöbo and numerous controversial hate crimes, including the growth of skinhead and Neo-Nazi movements, and the rise of the populist New Democracy party. It only describes the situation in the country without any challenge or criticism.

== Adaptations ==
The novel was adapted into a four-episode television miniseries, Wallander, by the Swedish public broadcaster Sveriges Television in 1994. Wallander is played by Rolf Lassgård.

Faceless Killers has also been adapted into a 90-minute television episode for the BBC's Wallander series starring Kenneth Branagh as Wallander. It was first broadcast on 3 January 2010. Fredrik Gunnarsson, who played Svartman in the Swedish TV series, had a cameo in this episode. Notably, in the episode, the ethnicity of the killers was changed from Yugoslav to Arab, possibly due to the decreased actuality of the Yugoslav wars and in recognition of later refugee currents from the Iraq War, which was notable in Swedish political debate already in the 2000s.

The novel has also been broadcast on BBC Radio 7, read by the English actor David Warner, who plays Wallander's father in the British Wallander series.

The book will be adapted as a 90-minute film for the new Wallander series starring Gustaf Skarsgård.
