= Wallander =

Wallander may refer to:

== TV, film, books ==
- Kurt Wallander, a fictional Swedish police inspector in novels by Henning Mankell

- Wallander (film series), Swedish-language television films of the Wallander stories starring Rolf Lassgård
- Wallander (Swedish TV series), TV4 production starring Krister Henriksson
- Wallander (British TV series), BBC One production starring Kenneth Branagh
- Young Wallander, a Netflix production starring Adam Pålsson

== People ==
- Arthur W. Wallander (1892–1980), New York City Police Commissioner
- Celeste A. Wallander (born 1961), American international relations expert
