= One Step Behind =

1997 crime novel by Swedish author Henning Mankell

- First edition (Sweden)
- Author: Henning Mankell
- Original title: Steget efter
- Translator: Ebba Segerberg
- Language: Swedish
- Series: Kurt Wallander #7
- Genre: Crime, Mystery novel
- Publisher: Ordfront
- Publication date: 1997
- Publication place: Sweden
- English publication date: September 2002
- Media type: Print (Hardcover, Paperback)
- Pages: 400 pp (Eng. hardback trans.)
- ISBN: 1-86046-983-3 (Eng. trans.)
- Preceded by: The Fifth Woman
- Followed by: Firewall

One Step Behind is a 1997 crime novel by Swedish author Henning Mankell, the seventh in his acclaimed Inspector Wallander series.

In 2002, the book was a finalist for the Los Angeles Times Book Prize for Mystery/Thriller.

== Synopsis ==
Two young women and one young man, inexplicably dressed as the nobility of Sweden did during the reign of Gustavus III, are found dead, each slain with a single bullet, their bodies half consumed by animals in the wilderness. Wallander is horrified when he makes a connection between the crime and his close friend and colleague Svedberg, who is then found savagely murdered in his own home. Tormented by his own loss, the detective is nevertheless startled that the connection to Svedberg unravels into revelations about himself he never could have possibly imagined, all amidst the pitting of the Ystad police against a deranged, merciless killer who remains just one step ahead...

== Adaptation ==
In 2005, One Step Behind was adapted by Swedish public broadcaster Sveriges Television into a theatrical film, starring Rolf Lassgård as Wallander.

In 2008, British broadcaster BBC One broadcast a 90-minute adaptation as part of its Wallander television series starring Kenneth Branagh.

The book will be adapted for the upcoming Wallander series starring Gustaf Skarsgård.
