= Sidetracked (novel) =

1995 novel by Henning Mankell

- First edition (Swedish)
- Author: Henning Mankell
- Original title: Villospår
- Translator: Steven T. Murray
- Language: Swedish
- Series: Kurt Wallander #5
- Genre: Crime, Mystery novel
- Publisher: Ordfront
- Publication date: 1995
- Publication place: Sweden
- English publication date: 1999
- Media type: Print (Hardcover, Paperback)
- Pages: 420 pp (Eng. hardback trans.)
- ISBN: 1-86046-785-7 (Eng. trans.)
- OCLC: 44398108
- Preceded by: The Man Who Smiled
- Followed by: The Fifth Woman

Sidetracked (first published as Villospår in 1995) is a crime novel by Swedish author Henning Mankell, the fifth in his Kurt Wallander series. Translated into English, it won the UK Crime Writers' Association annual Gold Dagger award for "best crime novel" in 2001.

== Synopsis ==
In the sweltering Swedish summer of 1994, a sadistic serial killer begins preying on elderly, successful men, violently slaughtering them with an axe before collecting their scalps as trophies. Meanwhile, Wallander witnesses a young woman from the Dominican Republic set herself on fire, and must also cope with his increasingly despondent father, who's determined to make one final trip to Italy. As he investigates the two cases, the Ystad detective uncovers a sinister link to prostitution rackets and the white slavery trade.

== Adaptations ==
In 2001, Sidetracked was adapted by Swedish public broadcaster Sveriges Television into a two and a half hour television movie, starring Rolf Lassgård as Wallander. In 2008, British broadcaster BBC One broadcast a 90-minute adaptation for its Wallander television series starring Kenneth Branagh.

Sidetracked will be adapted again for the new series starring Gustaf Skarsgård as Wallander.
