= The Fifth Woman =

1966 crime novel by Henning Mankell

- First edition (Swedish)
- Author: Henning Mankell
- Original title: Den femte kvinnan
- Translator: Steven T. Murray
- Language: Swedish
- Series: Kurt Wallander #6
- Genre: Crime novel
- Publisher: Ordfront
- Publication date: 1996
- Publication place: Sweden
- English publication date: 2000
- Media type: Print (Hardcover, Paperback)
- Pages: 428 pp (Eng. hardback trans.)
- ISBN: 1-86046-854-3 (Eng. trans.)
- OCLC: 59544856
- Preceded by: Sidetracked
- Followed by: One Step Behind

The Fifth Woman (original: Den femte kvinnan; 1996) is a crime novel by Swedish author Henning Mankell, the sixth in his acclaimed Inspector Wallander series.

== Synopsis ==
A sadistic serial killer has been preying on men, beginning with a retired car salesman whose interests appear to be limited to bird watching and poetry and whose body was discovered in a punji stick pit; and continuing with a flower shop manager, found starved and garrotted in the woods. Wallander soon realises both men have a past record of violence towards women, and after another man is drowned in a lake, he goes on the hunt for an avenging angel...

== Adaptations ==
In 2002, The Fifth Woman was adapted by Swedish public broadcaster Sveriges Television into a four-part television miniseries, starring Rolf Lassgård as Wallander. British broadcaster BBC commissioned a 90-minute adaptation for its Wallander television series starring Kenneth Branagh. The episode was broadcast in January 2010.
