= Yellow Bird (company) =

Swedish media company

Jarowskij/Yellow Bird
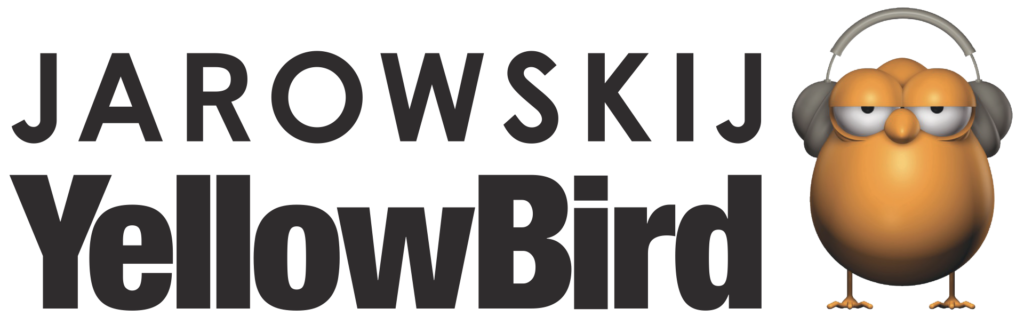
- Formerly: Yellow Bird (2003–2024)
- Type: Subsidiary
- Industry: Motion pictures Television
- Founded: 2003; 23 years ago
- Founder: Ole Søndberg; Henning Mankell; Lars Björkman
- Headquarters: Stockholm, Sweden; Los Angeles, United States
- Key people: Jakob Feeney (CEO)
- Owner: Zodiak Media (2007–2016); Banijay Entertainment (2016–present)
- Number of employees: 20
- Parent: Jarowskij (2024–)
- Website: yellowbird.se

Jarowskij/Yellow Bird, formerly known as Yellow Bird is a Swedish film and television production company owned by Banijay Entertainment. In 2003 Danish producer Ole Søndberg and Swedish author Henning Mankell started a collaboration on a series of television films based on Mankell's famous fictional detective Kurt Wallander and Yellow Bird was born. The success of the initial Wallander films was followed by Stieg Larsson’s Millennium trilogy, Jo Nesbø’s Headhunters, Liza Marklund’s Annika Bengtzon series as well as the British version of Wallander starring Kenneth Branagh.

== History ==
Logo used until 2024.

In February 2007, it was announced that Zodiak Media had acquired Yellow Bird in order for Zodiak to strengthen its drama production operations in both Swedish and Europe as Yellow Bird became a subsidiary of Zodiak Television AB with the drama production output of Zodiak's fellow Swedish production subsidiary Jarowskij was folded into Yellow Bird as Yellow Bird's co-founder Ole Søndberg continued operating Yellow Bird as creative chief. Yellow Bird and its production & distribution parent Zodiak Media would later merged into French production & distribution group Banijay Entertainment nine years later in February 2016, which eventually became the world's biggest leading indie television production company with Yellow Bird became Banijay's new Swedish television production subsidiary and its entry into the Swedish television market as Banijay's international distribution arm Banijay Rights began distributing Yellow Bird's programmes.

A year later in 2008 following Zodiak's acquisition of Yellow Bird one year prior in February 2007, Yellow Bird who previously had relationships with German authors and production companies had expanded their production operations into Germany for the first time outside of its home country of Sweden by establishing a Munich-based German joint venture production division with former Bavaria Media Television producer Oliver Schundler called Yellow Bird Pictures, marking Yellow Bird's entry into the German television market with the new division focus on producing feature films and TV drama for German-speaking territories.

In October 2017 one year after Banijay Group's acquisition of Yellow Bird and its French parent Zodiak Media back in February 2016, Yellow Bird announced its entry into the British scripted production industry by launching their own British production division based in Central London called Yellow Bird UK, marking Yellow Bird's entry into the British television market and expanded Banijay's British operations with Yellow Bird's CCO Berna Levin heading Yellow Bird's new British production division Yellow Bird UK who will focus on developing and creating original ideas with international appeal and a Nordic noir look and feel for British audiences, working with all broadcasters and platforms.

In October 2018 two years following Yellow Bird's establishment of its UK division Yellow Bird UK, Yellow Bird entered the American scripted television joined forces with Banijay Group's fellow American unscripted production subsidiary Bunim/Murray Productions to launch an American joint venture production division called Yellow Bird US, marking the latter's entry into the scripted television operations alongside Yellow Bird's entry into the US with Marianne Gray heading Yellow Bird's American joint venture production division Yellow Bird US with the new division being based in Bunim/Murray's LA offices.

In September 2024 when Yellow Bird's French parent company Banijay Entertainment through Banijay Nordics announced their restructuring of its Swedish operations, Yellow Bird was placed under Banijay's fellow production subsidiary Jarowskij (whom Yellow Bird previously inherited Jarowskij's drama production output in 2007) as their division and had merged Yellow Bird with the former's scripted production operations and had it renamed as a premium scripted production label called Jarowskij/Yellow Bird as Yellow Bird CEO Elin Kvist was named president of the new scripted label.

== Productions ==
=== Tjuvarnas jul – Trollkarlens hemlighet ===
In this feature film adventure, with characters from the popular advent calendar "Tjuvarnas jul", the foundling Charlie meets a mysterious wizard at the carnival. He reveals to her a world of magic and entertainment. The leading roles are played by Tea Stjärne, Gustaf Hammarsten and Elisabet Carlsson. Gustaf Skarsgård plays the role of the Wizzard.

Shooting occurred during autumn/winter 2013 with the premiere in autumn 2014.

=== Echoes from the Dead ===
A feature film released in 2013 and based on the debut novel by Johan Theorin. Its premise: Can you ever come to terms with a missing child? Julia Davidsson has not. Her five-year-old son disappeared twenty years ago on the Swedish island of Öland. No trace of him has ever been found. Lead roles are played by Lena Endre, Tord Peterson and Thomas W Gabrielsson.

=== Headhunters ===
Headhunters is a feature film released in 2011 and based on the novel by Jo Nesbø. It is a dark comic thriller centered on a corporate headhunter whose life and marriage are suddenly threatened and turned upside-down when he himself becomes hunted by an unknown individual. The lead roles are played by Aksel Hennie, Nikolaj Coster-Waldau and Synnøve Macody Lund.

=== Wallander ===
From 2005 to 2006 13 new stories starring Krister Henriksson as Kurt Wallander were produced. The first film is based on the Linda Wallander novel Before the Frost and was released in cinemas. The rest of the films are original stories based on plots written by Mankell with scriptwriting completed by others. Two more were theatrical releases and the rest were released on DVD and shown on TV. In 2008, a further 13 films were commissioned. Filming began in August 2008, and filming will continue, and releases begin, in 2009. The first of these films, Hämnden (The Revenge), was a theatrical release on 9 January 2009, directed by award-winning Paris-based Franco-Swedish director Charlotte Brändström. The remaining 12 films will be released on DVD and then be broadcast on TV4 at a later date. After filming is completed on the 2009 series, Henriksson will not play Wallander again, having only signed the new contract because he thought the 2005 series could have been better.

As a series, Mankell's Wallander has been nominated for The International TV Dagger at the 2009 Crime Thriller Awards, an awards ceremony presented by British television channel ITV3 and the Crime Writers' Association.

Yellow Bird recently co-produced two English-language Wallander series, starring Kenneth Branagh as Wallander, with the British broadcaster, the BBC. Series 1 premiered in the UK in November 2008 and series 2 aired in January 2010.

The first series won several BAFTAs. Branagh's portrayal won him the award for best actor at the 35th Broadcasting Press Guild Television and Radio Awards (2009). The Hollywood Foreign Press Association has nominated Branagh for the Golden Globe Award for Best Performance by an Actor in a Mini-Series or Motion Picture Made for Television for his performance in One Step Behind.

=== Stieg Larsson's Millennium books ===
Yellow Bird produced three films based on Stieg Larsson's Millennium trilogy. The Millennium books were originally intended to be released as one motion picture and two television mini-series, but popular demand and pressure from the Swedish Film Institute, one of the main financiers behind the films, altered the original plans. The Millennium films have been sold to most European and many Latin American markets. The films also had a US release.

Yellow Bird executive producer Sören Staermose confirmed in an interview with Swedish newspaper Expressen that negotiations are taking place to produce English language Millennium films. This would not be a US remake of the Swedish films but rather new Hollywood films based on the books. In the interview he states that the possible US films might be produced in a similar way as the Wallander TV series starring Kenneth Branagh, shooting in Sweden using English speaking actors. He also states that it is up to the director and says that the story could just as well take place in another country, like Canada.

On December 16, 2009 Svenska Dagbladet reported that Sony Pictures Entertainment was in negotiations with Yellow Bird about the film rights according to Yellow Bird Managing Director Mikael Wallén. Steve Zaillian was in discussions to adapt the first book.

=== Liza Marklund's Annika Bengtzon series ===
The company acquired film rights to six of best-selling author Liza Marklund's books featuring the criminal reporter Annika Bengtzon. Plans to produce movies for the Scandinavian and international markets were underway for each of the six titles: Studio Sex, Prime Time, The Red Wolf, Nobel’s Last Will, Lifetime and A Place in the Sun.

Marklund's Annika Bengtzon series has a following all over the world. The eight books have sold more than nine million copies internationally and have been translated into 30 languages. Liza Marklund is currently working on the ninth book in the series.

Filming was expected to start at the end of 2010 with an estimated budget of approximately SEK 100 million.

=== Other projects ===
Yellow Bird has also produced six TV movies about criminal inspector Irene Huss, based on the books by Helene Tursten.

In March 2009 the company acquired the film rights for Norwegian crime writer Anne Holt's books about inspector Yngvar Stubø and Inger Johanne Vik – a psychologist and lawyer with a previous career in the FBI.

In April 2009 the company announced they optioned film rights for Norwegian author Jo Nesbø's most recent novel Headhunters.

The company purchased the rights to Blekingegadeligan, the bestselling book by Danish journalist Peter Øvig Knudsen about The Blekinge Street Gang, a group of about a dozen communist political activists who during the 1970s and 80s committed a number of highly professional robberies in Denmark and sent the money to the Popular Front for the Liberation of Palestine. The series consists of 8 episodes and was shown on Danish channel DR1 in 2011.

== International divisions ==
=== Germany ===
Yellow Bird produced a 2x90 German TV series based on the Henning Mankell novel Kennedy's Brain. The series is made for broadcaster ARD. The leading role is played by German actress Iris Berben. The series also stars Swedish actors Michael Nyqvist and Rolf Lassgård.

In October 2008, Yellow Bird launched "Yellow Bird Pictures", a subsidiary based in Munich, Germany. The start up is a joint venture between Yellow Bird and producer Oliver Schündler. Yellow Bird Pictures will focus on feature films and TV fiction for the German-speaking market. Initial productions will be based on rights that Yellow Bird already controls.

The German subsidiary adapted Henning Mankell's novel The Chinaman.

=== United Kingdom ===
In October 2017, Banijay Group (the current parent company of Yellow Bird as a result of acquiring the company's former parent Zodiak Media in February 2016) launched a British counterpart to Yellow Bird named Yellow Bird UK. Yellow Bird UK will focus, it will have close ties to the Swedish Yellow Bird.

In December 2019, Netflix announced that Yellow Bird UK would produce an as-yet untitled series on the origin story of music-streaming service Spotify.

In July 2023, Banijay announced that they're shutting down Yellow Bird's UK division Yellow Bird UK after six years.

=== United States ===
On 10 October 2018 (a year after the British division was launched), Yellow Bird teamed up with its fellow American sister company Bunim/Murray Productions to form Yellow Bird US, an American production joint venture based in Bunim/Murray's Los Angeles offices.

In February 2020, Yellow Bird US announced it would adapt Krystal Sutherland's novel A Semi-Definitive List of Worst Nightmares into a TV series.
