= Italian Shoes =

2006 novel by Henning Mankell

- First edition
- Author: Henning Mankell
- Original title: Italienska skor
- Translator: Laurie Thompson
- Language: Swedish
- Genre: Genre fiction
- Publisher: Leopard förlag(Swedish); Harvill Secker (English)
- Publication date: 2006
- Publication place: Sweden
- English publication date: 2009
- Media type: Print (Hardcover, Paperback)
- ISBN: 978-1-84655-099-7 (Eng. trans.)

Italian Shoes is a 2006 novel by Swedish writer Henning Mankell. The English translation is by Laurie Thompson and in contrast with Mankell's other well-known novels has been written in the first person.

== Plot summary ==
Set around the year 2004, the novel focusses on Fredrik Welin, once a successful orthopaedic surgeon forced to retire early from his professional career. He has retreated to a tiny, remote island in the Stockholm archipelago which he has inherited from his grandparents and is now the sole inhabitant. The island is normally surrounded for at least half the year by thick sea ice which adds to the sense of solitude. Fredrik lives a reclusive and somewhat austere lifestyle in a run-down house, enjoying few luxuries. Welin's only companions are his aged cat and dog. The postman, Jansson is the one regular visitor to the island. Despite this Welin has never become particularly sociable with Jansson. In fact he displays little sympathy for the postman's frequent requests to be treated for his medical concerns and has privately diagnosed Jansson as suffering from mild hypochondria.

One cold winter's day Welin spies a figure out on the ice, struggling to make its way on foot towards his island. This unanticipated encounter leads to a surprising revelation and a journey not only across Sweden, but also back to his childhood and early adult life. The unfolding events force him to confront painful memories from his past, from which his isolation on the island has enabled him to remain largely immune until now. Fredrik also seeks to address the regrets he has about the unfortunate incident which led to his enforced retirement

Key themes of the novel concern the dilemmas faced by those experiencing aging and death, both at first hand and through others close to them; the impact of poverty and destitution on an individual's life chances; and vulnerability, courage and forgiveness in intimate relationships.

The caves of Lascaux are evoked, Louise fighting the air conditioning which would destroy the paintings. In reality, the caves have been closed to the public since the 1970s. Only a replica of the site is accessible.

== Film ==
Kenneth Branagh, who portrays Kurt Wallander in the BBC adaption, will direct and produce an upcoming film based on Italian Shoes. The film will probably star Anthony Hopkins as Fredrik Welin. Filming will most likely start in the fall of 2011, after a possible third season of Wallander has wrapped up.
