= Before the Frost =

2002 novel by Henning Mankell

- First edition
- Author: Henning Mankell
- Original title: Innan frosten
- Translator: Ebba Segerberg
- Language: Swedish
- Series: Kurt Wallander
- Genre: Crime novel
- Publisher: Leopard förlag
- Publication date: 2002
- Publication place: Sweden
- English publication date: 2004
- Media type: Print (Hardcover, Paperback)
- Pages: 388 pp (Eng. hardback trans.)
- ISBN: 1-84343-113-0 (Eng. trans.)
- Preceded by: Firewall
- Followed by: The Troubled Man

Before the Frost (Innan Frosten, 2002) is a novel by Swedish crime-writer Henning Mankell.

The protagonist is Linda Wallander, daughter of Inspector Wallander. The book was to be the first in a three-book series with Linda as the main character. However Mankell abandoned the series after just one novel when the actress playing Linda in the Swedish films, Johanna Sällström, committed suicide in 2007.

Kurt Wallander and Stefan Lindman (the protagonist from The Return of the Dancing Master) also feature in the novel.

Linda Wallander is bored. Just graduated from the police academy, she is waiting to start work at the Ystad police station and move into her own apartment. Meantime, she is living with her father and, like fathers and daughters everywhere, they are driving each other crazy. Nor will they be able to escape each other when she moves out. Her father is Inspector Kurt Wallander, a veteran of the Ystad police force, whom she will have to work alongside. Linda's boredom doesn't last long. Soon she is embroiled in the case of her childhood friend Anna, who has inexplicably disappeared. As the investigation proceeds, she makes a few rookie mistakes. They are understandable, but they are also life-threatening. And as the case her father is working on dovetails with her own, something far more calculated and dangerous than either could have imagined begins to emerge.

== Adaptations ==
A feature film adaptation directed by Kjell-Åke Andersson was made in 2004 and released in Swedish cinemas on 14 January 2005. It stars Johanna Sällström as Linda and Krister Henriksson as Kurt. The film also serves as the opening installment of Mankell's Wallander, a series of theatrical and straight-to-video films based on story outlines by Mankell but otherwise unconnected to the novels. Sällström and Henriksson reprise their roles in these films.

The BBC filmed the novel for the British television adaptation of Mankell's Wallander novels, but they rewrote the story to make Wallander the protagonist, with Kenneth Branagh playing the role of Kurt Wallander.

A stage adaptation authorized by Mankell was premiered at the Westphalia State Theatre in Paderborn, Germany, in 2006.
