= Wallander (upcoming TV series) =

Upcoming Swedish television series

- Genre: Crime drama nordic noir
- Based on: Kurt Wallander series by Henning Mankell
- Showrunner: Jörgen Bergmark
- Written by: Jörgen Bergmark; Josefin Johansson; Antonia Pyk
- Directed by: Pella Kagerman; Hugo Lilja; Molly Hartleb
- Starring: Gustaf Skarsgård
- Country of origin: Sweden
- Original language: Swedish
- No. of episodes: 3

Production
- Executive producers: Lisa Dahlberg; Simon Cox; Elin Kvist
- Running time: 90 minutes
- Production companies: Banijay Entertainment; Film I Skåne; Jarowskij/Yellow Bird; TV4; Ystad-Österlen Film Fond

Original release
- Network: TV4

Wallander is an upcoming Swedish nordic noir television series based on the Kurt Wallander book series by Henning Mankell, starring Gustaf Skarsgård as the titular character.

== Premise ==
Seasoned policeman Kurt Wallander grapples with middle-age, alcoholism and the haunting nature of his job while investigating dark and perilous crimes in the idyllic Skåne County town of Ystad. At the same time, he must confront his broken marriage and a fractured relationship with his daughter.

== Cast ==
- Gustaf Skarsgård as Kurt Wallander, a veteran police detective in Ystad
- Sophia Martinsson as Linda Wallander, Kurt and Mona's daughter
- Ana Gil De Melo Nascimento as Mona Wallander, Kurt's estranged wife
- Göran Ragnerstam as Henning Wallander, Kurt's father

== Production ==
A new adaptation of the Wallander novels was unveiled in April 2025 by Banijay Entertainment and Yellow Bird to air on the TV4 network. The series will consist of three 90-minute episodes adapted from the novels One Step Behind, Sidetracked, and Faceless Killers; they will be directed by Molly Hartleb, Pella Kågerman, and Hugo Lilja, and written by Antonia Pyk, Josefin Johansson, and Jörgen Bergmark. Gustaf Skarsgård will star in the series, having previously played the character as a young officer in "The Pyramid", a 2007 episode of the earlier adaptation starring Rolf Lassgård.

By August 13, 2025, production was underway in Ystad, with filming for the first episode having half-finished three weeks later. In January 2026, Sophia Martinsson, Ana Gil De Melo Nascimento, and Göran Ragnerstam were announced to be playing Wallander's family.

The series is projected to debut in 2026/2027 on TV4 and its streaming companion TV4 Play.
