= Wallander (British TV series) =

2008–2016 crime TV series

- Opening titles
- Genre: Crime drama; Detective fiction; Murder mystery
- Based on: Kurt Wallander by Henning Mankell
- Written by: Richard Cottan; Peter Harness; Richard McBrien
- Directed by: Philip Martin; Niall MacCormick; Benjamin Caron
- Starring: Kenneth Branagh
- Opening theme: "Nostalgia" by Emily Barker
- Composers: Martin Phipps; Vince Pope
- Countries of origin: United Kingdom; Sweden
- Original language: English
- No. of series: 4
- No. of episodes: 12

Production
- Executive producers: Francis Hopkinson; Anne Mensah; Rebecca Eaton; Hans-Wolfgang Jurgen; Anni Faurby; Ole Søndberg; Kenneth Branagh; Andy Harries
- Producers: Daniel Ahlqvist; Simon Moseley; Sanne Wohlenberg
- Production locations: Ystad, Sweden; Skåne, Sweden
- Cinematography: Anthony Dod Mantle; Jan Jonaeus; Igor Martinovic; Lukas Strebel
- Editors: Tony Cranstoun; Kristina Hetherington; Tim Porter
- Running time: 89 minutes
- Production companies: Left Bank Pictures; Yellow Bird; TKBC

Original release
- Network: BBC One; BBC HD (2008–10)
- Release: 30 November 2008 – 5 June 2016

Wallander is a British television series broadcast from 2008 to 2016. It was adapted from a Swedish series based on the Swedish novelist Henning Mankell's Kurt Wallander novels and starring Kenneth Branagh as the eponymous police inspector. It was the first time the Wallander novels had been adapted into an English-language production. Yellow Bird, a production company formed by Mankell, began negotiations with British companies to produce the adaptations in 2006. In 2007 Branagh met Mankell to discuss playing the role. Contracts were signed and work began on the films, adapted from the novels Sidetracked, Firewall and One Step Behind, in January 2008. Philip Martin was hired as lead director. Martin worked with cinematographer Anthony Dod Mantle to establish a visual style for the series.

The first three-episode series, produced by Yellow Bird, Left Bank Pictures and TKBC for BBC Scotland, was filmed in Ystad, Sweden, and broadcast on BBC One in November and December 2008. The second series was filmed from July to October 2009 and was broadcast in January 2010. The third series was filmed in the summer of 2011 in Ystad and Riga, Latvia, and aired in July 2012. The fourth and final series was shot from October 2014 to January 2015 and premiered on German TV, dubbed into German, in December 2015. The final series aired in the original English on BBC One in May 2016. Critics have written positively of the series, which has won a Broadcasting Press Guild Award (Best Actor for Branagh) and six British Academy Television Awards, including Best Drama Series.

== Characters ==
The series is based on Kurt Wallander (Branagh), a police detective inspector in the small town of Ystad, Sweden. Branagh describes Wallander as "an existentialist who is questioning what life is about and why he does what he does every day, and for whom acts of violence never become normal. There is a level of empathy with the victims of crime that is almost impossible to contain, and one of the prices he pays for that sort of empathy is a personal life that is a kind of wasteland." In the novels, Wallander regularly listens to opera in his apartment and his car. This signature hobby has been dropped for this adaptation; producer Francis Hopkinson believes it would make Wallander too similar to Inspector Morse, whose love of opera is already familiar to British viewers. Branagh did not watch any of the Swedish Wallander films before playing the role, preferring to bring his own interpretation of the character to the screen.

Wallander's team at the Ystad police station is made up of: Anne-Britt Hoglund (Smart), Kalle Svedberg (Beard) and Magnus Martinsson (Hiddleston). Of Wallander and Hoglund, Smart said, "Our relationship is based on this impeccable mutual respect which is all very Scandinavian and, actually, more interesting to play." The team is joined at murder scenes by Nyberg (McCabe), a forensics expert. The team is overseen by Lisa Holgersson (Shimmin), Ystad's chief of police. Away from the police station, Wallander has a tempestuous relationship with his daughter, Linda (Spark), and his father, Povel (Warner), whom Wallander discovers in Sidetracked has recently been diagnosed with Alzheimer's disease. Wallander's father spends his days sitting in an art studio, painting the same landscape repeatedly while in the care of his new wife, Gertrude (Hemingway).

== Cast ==
- Kenneth Branagh as Kurt Wallander
- Sarah Smart as Ann-Britt Höglund (Series 1–3)
- Tom Hiddleston as Magnus Martinsson (Series 1–2)
- Richard McCabe as Sven Nyberg
- Tom Beard as Kalle Svedberg (Series 1)
- Sadie Shimmin as Lisa Holgersson (Series 1–2)
- Jeany Spark as Linda Wallander, Kurt's daughter
- David Warner as Povel Wallander, Kurt's father (Series 1–2, 4)
- Polly Hemingway as Gertrude, Kurt's step-mother (Series 1–2)
- Saskia Reeves as Vanja Andersson (Series 2–3)
- Rebekah Staton as Kristyna (Series 3)
- Mark Hadfield as Stefan Lindeman (Series 3)
- Barnaby Kay as Lennart Mattson (Series 3–4)

== Production ==
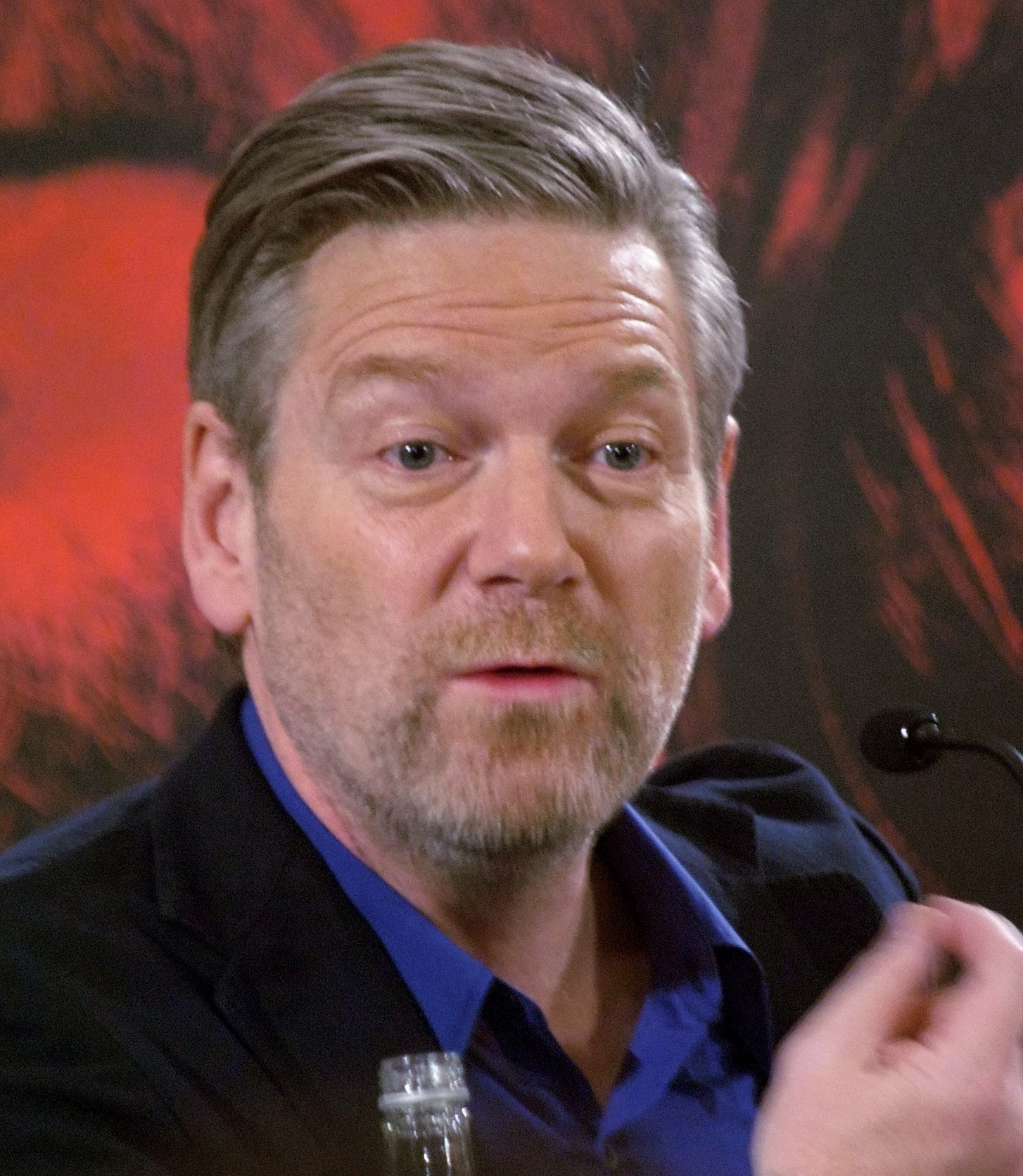
Kenneth Branagh approached Henning Mankell personally, asking if he could play Wallander

In 2006 Yellow Bird managing director Morten Fisker opened discussions with British production companies about developing English-language adaptations of the Kurt Wallander novels, to which Yellow Bird holds the distribution rights. The BBC and Channel 4 were believed to be involved in discussions; the BBC had already announced plans to adapt Mankell's The Return of the Dancing Master. Fisker wanted to bring a new detective to British screens to replace Inspector Morse, who had been killed off on-screen in 2000. Actors proposed to play Wallander were Trevor Eve, Neil Pearson, Jason Isaacs, David Morrissey, Clive Owen and Michael Gambon. Negotiations were still under way in 2007, when Kenneth Branagh met Henning Mankell at an Ingmar Bergman film festival and asked to play Wallander. Branagh had started reading the Wallander books "relatively late" but enjoyed them, and read all nine translated novels in a month. Mankell agreed to let Branagh play the role, and Branagh visited Ystad in December to scout for locations and meet Film i Skånes chief executive Ralf Ivarsson.

A series of three 90-minute adaptations was commissioned by BBC Scotland's Anne Mensah and BBC Controller of Fiction Jane Tranter in January 2008. Like Morten Fisker, the BBC wanted a returning series that would have the same audience appeal as Inspector Morse, Prime Suspect and Cracker. Yellow Bird was contracted as a co-producer, working with Left Bank Pictures, a production house formed in 2007 by former ITV Controller of Comedy, Drama and Film Andy Harries. Harries described Wallander as "more than just a detective series" and that it would be visually "very picture postcard". The first series consists of adaptations of Sidetracked, Firewall and One Step Behind. Philip Martin was hired as lead director of the series, and met with Branagh, Harries and Left Bank producer Francis Hopkinson in January. The four discussed how the adaptations would appear on screen, agreeing that the characterisations, atmosphere and ideas would be difficult to portray on screen. Richard Cottan was hired to adapt Mankell's novels, and delivered his first scripts in February. Cottan changed the plots of some of the books in order to fit them into a 90-minute adaptation, though made sure the scripts retained Wallander's "journey". The following month, Martin began discussions with cinematographer Anthony Dod Mantle about what visual style the films would have. They agreed to use the Red One digital camera to shoot on, which has a near-35 mm resolution and is not as expensive as 35 mm; Dod Mantle said that the BBC "has politics" about the cheaper 16 mm and Super 16. Casting of British actors, which was done in London, was completed by April, and the whole crew moved over to Ystad to begin rehearsals. Martin wanted the actors playing police officers to know how to fire a gun, so arranged for them to spend time at a firing range using live ammunition. Wallander's distinctive mobile phone ringtone was specially composed by Lee Crichlow.

=== Series 1 ===
A £6 million budget was originally assigned to the first series, which increased to £7.5 million. Half of that came from the BBC, and the rest from pre-sale co-production funding from American WGBH Boston and German ARD Degeto, and a tax deduction for filming in Sweden. ARD Degeto and WGBH are credited as co-producers for their budget contribution. Using scripts adapted by Richard Cottan and Richard McBrien, filming ran for 12 weeks from April to July 2008 in Wallander's hometown of Ystad, Sweden.

Location filming was principally set in Ystad. Interior sets were constructed at Ystad Studios under the supervision of Anders Olin, who also designed the sets of the Swedish Wallander films. The main police station set is 500 square metres, twice the size of Olin's previous sets. For exterior shots of the police station, a combination of the Ystad railway station and swimming pool was used. Mock-ups of Ystads Allehanda, a local newspaper, were produced as working props. Producer Simon Moseley explained that the mock-ups use Swedish words that can be understood by English-speaking audiences. Moseley also explained that some pronunciations of Swedish words are Anglicised (such as the pronunciation of "Ystad" and "Wallander"), as "the authentic local accent is very strange to English ears and we didn't want to stray into 'Allo 'Allo! territory". Like Branagh, Philip Martin did not watch any of the Swedish-language Wallander films so that he could bring a fresh interpretation to the films. Filming was scheduled for 66 days over 12 weeks in Sweden; each film would be shot back-to-back over 22 days. Martin directed the first and third films and Niall MacCormick directed the second. Dod Mantle was keen to conceive a good style for what could become a long-running series.

Filming on Sidetracked commenced on 14 April on location at a townhouse in Södra Änggatan, Ystad. The same week, filming was done at Häckeberga Castle near Genarp. Another castle was going to be used, but the deal fell through. The manager of Häckeberga Castle, which had been turned into a hotel, allowed filming to take place there on the night of 17 April, though guests had to be moved to stables for the night. Scenes set in the rapeseed field were filmed at Charlottenlund Mansion. Location scouts had been impressed with the look of the winter rapeseed. The team from Danish Special Effects had difficulty setting the field on fire. Using the Red One digital camera meant that rushes could be viewed on set, saving time on the already tight schedule. Martin and Dod Mantle believed that the Red captured the Swedish light well, so there was no need to use big lighting rigs. The cheaper filming option meant that the budget could be used on other things.

One Step Behind was filmed in May. The opening scene, featuring a multiple murder and burial in the woods, was filmed on location at the Hagestads nature reserve. A large hole was needed for the shallow grave, so Yellow Bird approached the local authority for permission. The request was granted on the same day as it was lodged, with the stipulation that the hole be filled in after filming. Niall MacCormick arrived in Sweden to film Firewall in June, concluding in the third week of July. Danish Special Effects also worked on body squibs, bullet hits and atmospheric effects. Their post-production work was completed in August. While the crew were in Sweden, editing was done at The Chimney Pot in Stockholm. Post-production was completed by The Farm in London. Martin Phipps composed the soundtrack to the series. A version of "Nostalgia" by Australian singer-songwriter Emily Barker is the opening theme. The three films of series 1 were broadcast on BBC One on 30 November 7 December, and 14 December 2008 respectively.

=== Series 2 ===
The production of three new films based on Faceless Killers, The Fifth Woman and The Man Who Smiled was confirmed by the BBC in May 2009 to start in the summer in Ystad. The BBC broadcast the series in January 2010. Richard Cottan wrote Faceless Killers and The Fifth Woman, while Simon Donald wrote The Man Who Smiled. Hettie MacDonald directed Faceless Killers, Andy Wilson handled The Man Who Smiled while Aisling Walsh directed The Fifth Woman. Photographer Igor Martinovic (director of photography on Man on Wire) worked with Macdonald and Wilson while Lukas Strebel, who won an Emmy in 2009 for Little Dorrit, was in charge of photography for The Fifth Woman.

The second series started shooting on 22 June 2009. The film crew consisted of slightly more Britons, as the Swedish-language films were still filming in the area until December 2009. Yellow Bird's Daniel Ahlqvist said, "It is a quite special that we are doing two different Wallander productions at the same time. So it has been a little bit tougher to recruit competent personnel here in Skåne. We came to the conclusion that if we cannot get people from Skåne, we might as well bring in folks from the UK rather than Stockholm." The landscape of Skåne was a big part of the second series. Shooting started in the outskirts of Ystad but a big scene in Ystad city square was planned. Scenes were also planned to be filmed at the summer residence that served as the home for Wallander's father. Faceless Killers was first in the shooting schedule, followed by The Fifth Woman and last The Man Who Smiled. As with Series 1, each episode is filmed over approximately 22–23 days, with just 3–5 days set aside for studio recording, and the rest for location shooting. On 23 June, the film team spent all day in Simrishamn, a coastal town north east of Ystad. Scenes were shot at the local police station and in the town square. Production Manager Nina Sackmann explained that "the town was perfect for what we needed to convey with this film". On 21 July, the portions of road 1015 passing by the Karlsfält Farmland Estate north of Ystad was closed from 11 p.m. until midnight to accommodate the film crew.

On 18 August, closing scenes of The Fifth Woman, where Kurt Wallander is dragged away at gunpoint, were shot on location at Ystad railway station. On the right side of the railway track, this dramatic scene was being filmed and on the left side, commuters were exiting the train. About 40 metres away, the Swedish language Wallander film Vålnaden (The Ghost) was being filmed at the same time. Earlier in the week, scenes were shot at an old automobile repair and maintenance shop from 1928 in Hammenhög village. Part of the building had served as a flower shop when Mankell wrote The Fifth Woman and, since a murder victim is a flower shop owner, it was convenient to shoot in the now abandoned building.

Filming on The Man Who Smiled began at the beginning of September. Location production on the episode concluded on 2 October. The first couple of weeks featured location work outside of the swimming baths—which doubles as the exterior of the police station. For the last two weeks, production moved to locations around the countryside of Österlen. On Monday evening 14 September, the Ystad city square was closed off to film an important action scene from The Man Who Smiled where Kurt Wallander comes running across the square as a car explodes. The clear blue September sky caused problems with the lighting and they had to wait until the sun started to set.

Kenneth Branagh explained that the challenge for filming series one was to "create" the strange world of Ystad, in part as Henning Mankell saw it, in part as script writer Rick Cottan saw it, and then upon arrival to realise that the town looks different. "To get all these different visions to work together was a bit nervous last year. This year the pressure is to develop the style of this show and develop the characters, for example the other policemen at the station. Branagh claimed that there had been no problems shooting due to weather conditions except the last day of filming: "Henning Mankell often writes about the long Swedish summer rains, but during two years of filming we have not seen any of that. No wonder British tourists like to visit." He also stated that there is a possibility of a third series. "It all depends on how these new episodes are received, but I think I really would like to film more episodes. But we also need to feel that we have something more to offer, more to tell and that the scripts are good." Any filming on a third series would be postponed until 2011, to allow Branagh to work on Thor. Yellow Bird's Daniel Ahlqvist believes that The White Lioness's South African setting makes it difficult to film, and the post-Cold War plot of The Dogs of Riga is no longer relevant, but sees no reason why Before the Frost and some new story ideas, in the same vein as the original Yellow Bird films could not be developed for the BBC.

Local politicians supported and invested 8,000,000 Swedish kronor (roughly £750,000) in the second Wallander series through Film i Skåne, a regional resource and production centre.

Series 2 features some interesting choices of actors for minor roles. Fredrik Gunnarsson features in Faceless Killers as Valfrid Strom, Gunnarson appears in 17 episodes of Yellow Bird's Swedish language TV series as uniformed police officer Svartman. Rune Bergman had a minor role in the Swedish language adaptation of Faceless Killers and also featured in the TV film Luftslottet. Patrik Karlson featured in the Swedish language adaptation of The Man Who Smiled as well as the TV film Mastermind. Bergman and Karlson have the distinction of appearing in films starring the three Kurt Wallander actors. Karin Bertling also appears in the English language Faceless Killers and has previously worked on the Swedish-language TV film Before the Frost.

=== Series 3 ===
The third series aired in July 2012. Screenwriter Peter Harness wrote the scripts for all three films that made up Series 3. Mankell worked closely with Harness on the scripts. "He is too busy to talk to me all the time. But we have met to discuss the material, so he is involved in what happens", Harness told Ystads Allehanda.

Hiddleston and Shimmin did not return for this series. Actress Rebekah Staton portrayed a new character, Kristina, in all three episodes. Mark Hadfield joined the cast as police officer Stefan Lindeman, one of the main characters in the first season of the Swedish Wallander TV series and the lead character in the Mankell novel The Return of the Dancing Master (a book that has already been filmed in Swedish and German versions). Barnaby Kay plays Lennart Mattson, who is Chief Holgerson's successor.

On 4 August 2011 it was made official that three new films were in production. The filming of The Dogs of Riga started in Latvia on 1 August at The Hotel Riga, and concluded on 20 August. More scenes were shot in Ystad the following week. This film was directed by Esther May Campbell, and featured cinematography by Lukas Strebel who worked on the second Wallander series. The production tried to use as many Latvian actors as possible but a problem arose as most Latvian actors had a very limited knowledge of English. Latvian actor Artūrs Skrastiņš was the only native actor that landed a speaking role in the film. He portrayed Colonel Putnis. Romanian actor Dragos Bucur portrays Sergei Upitis, an investigative journalist. The film was partially funded by The Riga Film Fund and co-stars Lithuanian actress Ingeborga Dapkūnaitė.

On 10 August, several scenes were shot outside the Latvian Parliament and outside a building on Jēkaba street that was decorated with Swedish flags, to stand in for the Swedish embassy in Riga. On 13 August, the city closed down several streets to accommodate the filming. On 16 August scenes were filmed at Riga Central Station. The national police cars used in for this production had been equipped with stickers that said Rīgas pilsētas policijas (Riga City Police). These stickers covered up the usual coat of arms that Latvian police cars are decorated with, these stickers were designed specifically for the film and are easily removed. Nothing on Latvian police cars specifies what city they serve in.

On 22 August the film team was back in Sweden to film for one week. The shooting started at a football pitch in Kåseberga, which has been converted into a filming area. Producer Hillary Benson explained to local press that once The Dogs of Riga had wrapped up, the film team would be back in mid October to start filming the other two episodes. The first two series were filmed in the summer, this time around the aim was to film in autumn and winter.

The other two films in the series are Before the Frost, based on the novel of the same name, and An Event in Autumn, which is based on the short story "Händelse om hösten" (The Grave), a short story from 2004 published only in the Netherlands.

Before the Frost was directed by Charles Martin. Filming started in Ystad on 12 October 2011. The first days of shooting were stunts and scenes with an animal trainer as Kenneth Branagh did not arrive until 17 October. Scenes were also shot at The Chemistry Hall at the Macklean School in Skurup Municipality. With the local firefighters on standby, a stunt man poured petrol over himself and then set himself alight. This three-minute long film sequence took nine and a half hours to shoot. Filming began on Friday 14 October at 6 pm and wrapped at 3:30 am on Saturday morning. The film crew later came back at the end of October to shoot a scene using headmaster Christin Stigborgs' office. From Tuesday, 24 October and until the end of the week, three streets in central Ystad (Lilla Norregatan, Stora Norregatan and Sladdergatan) had to be closed down for a short time to shoot several scenes.

Parts of the film were shot in the Snogeholm nature conservation area, Sjöbo Municipality. Filming took place for several days along the roads and a parking space. This was mainly shots of the environment and the nature of the conversation area and the Snogeholm lake, according to production manager Martin Ersgård.

An Event in Autumn was the last film. Filming started 14 November and was directed by Toby Haynes. According to Yellow Bird producer Daniel Ahlqvist, An Event in Autumn is about how "Kurt tries to take charge of his own life by getting a new house but gets interrupted and is more or less forced back to his job".

On 21 and 23 October the crew was filming at an old small farm in the small village of Svarte. It is around the corner from the house where Wallander's father lived in the previous films. The small farm house is Wallander's new home but the remains of a dead woman are found on the property. Due to time constraints and unusually for a BBC production, all scenes were filmed with two cameras to provide more material for post production and cutting. The last week of shooting included filming some scenes in Germany.

With the previous two series, the Skåne Regional Council invested 7 and 8 million Swedish Krona through its subsidiary Film i Skåne. With the third series, the Skåne Regional Council only wanted to invest 2 million Krona. They later signed on to support the production by other means such as letting BBC and Yellow Bird use Ystad Studios for free, worth about half a million Swedish Krona. City of Ystad-Österlens Film Bond also invested 2 million Swedish Krona.

=== Series 4 ===
On 8 October 2014, the BBC announced that principal photography of the final three-episode fourth series had started.

The first episode, The White Lioness, is written by James Dormer (Strike Back, Outcast), and directed by Benjamin Caron (Tommy Cooper: Not Like That, Like This, Skins, My Mad Fat Diary). Most of the book takes place in South Africa and the episode was filmed in Cape Town in January 2015.

The final two installments in the Wallander series, A Lesson in Love and The Troubled Man were written by Peter Harness, not Ronan Bennett, as previously announced, and also directed by Benjamin Caron, and adapted from the final Wallander novel, The Troubled Man. These two episodes were filmed on location in Skåne, Sweden, and Copenhagen, Denmark.

Returning cast include Jeany Spark as Linda Wallander, Richard McCabe as Nyberg, Barnaby Kay as Lennart Mattson, and Ingeborga Dapkunaite as Baiba Liepa.

Shooting took place in Ystad Studios, simultaneously with the third season of Swedish-Danish crime drama The Bridge. The budget for the final season is 100 million Swedish kronor. The tax funded entities Ystad-Österlens filmfond and Film i Skåne have put three million Swedish kronor into the production according to Sveriges Radio.

The new series was shot on several locations surrounding Ystad, including Mossbystrand, Östra Hoby, Vårhallen Beach, Tunbyholm Castle plus Blekinge Province and the Danish island of Zealand. On 30 October, several scenes were shot at the Norreportskolan, a local Ystad middle school. Several of the students participated as extras.

The final three episodes had their world première dubbed into German on German network ARD, which co-produced them. They aired over three nights, on 25 December, 26 and 27, 2015. In Poland, the episodes aired on Ale Kino+ on 11, 18 and 25 March 2016. They made their English language première on BBC UKTV New Zealand on 11 April. In the US, 80-minute-long re-edited versions of the episodes aired as "Wallander, The Final Season" on the PBS anthology series Masterpiece Mystery! on 8, 15 and 22 May. BBC One broadcast the full 89-minute episodes in the UK beginning on 22 May 2016.

== Broadcast ==
A public screening of Sidetracked was given by the British Academy of Film and Television Arts on 10 November 2008, and was followed by a question-and-answer session with Philip Martin and Kenneth Branagh. A gala premiere of Sidetracked was held in Ystad on 23 November, a week before it was broadcast in Britain. Sidetracked's first British broadcast came on BBC One on 30 November, followed by Firewall on 7 December, and One Step Behind on 14 December. Episodes were simulcast on BBC HD. BBC Four broadcast programmes and films to complement the series; the schedule included a documentary by John Harvey titled Who is Kurt Wallander, as well as the Swedish adaptation of the Linda Wallander novel Before the Frost, and Mastermind, an installment of the Mankell's Wallander film series starring Krister Henriksson.

The series has already been sold to 14 countries and territories across the world, including TV4 Sweden, TV2 Norway, DR Denmark, MTV3 Finland, France on Arte, Canada, Slovenia, Australia, Poland, Lumiere Benelux and Svensk Film for its pan Scandinavian feed. BBC Worldwide, the BBC's commercial arm, sold the series to further buyers at the Mipcom television festival in October 2008. In the United States, PBS secured the broadcast rights through the co-production deal struck between its affiliate WGBH Boston and the BBC. It aired as part of WGBH's Masterpiece Mystery! in May 2009. In advance of the broadcast, Branagh and WGBH Boston's Rebecca Eaton presented a screening of an episode at The Paley Center for Media on 29 April. In Germany, ARD broadcast the first series episodes on 29 and 30 May, and 1 June 2009. TV4 broadcast the first series in Sweden from 11 October 2009.

== Episodes ==
=== Series 1 (2008) ===
No. overall	No. in series	Title	Directed by	Written by	Original release date	UK viewers (millions)
1	1	"Sidetracked"	Philip Martin	Richard Cottan	30 November 2008	6.63
Swedish detective Inspector Kurt Wallander attempts to connect the shocking suicide of a young woman and the vicious murder of a government minister, and eventually uncovers wrongdoing and corruption that extends to the heart of the Swedish establishment.
2	2	"Firewall"	Niall MacCormick	Richard Cottan & Richard McBrien	7 December 2008	5.97
A body is found at a cash point, the apparent victim of a heart attack, and later two teenage girls are arrested for the brutal murder of a cab driver. The two cases become one, leading to a conspiracy that stretches beyond the borders of Sweden.
3	3	"One Step Behind"	Philip Martin	Richard Cottan	14 December 2008	5.71
On Midsummer's Eve, three teenagers dressed in eighteenth-century fancy dress are shot dead in a secluded wood. One of Wallander's colleagues also turns up dead. Wallander knows the murders are related, but with his only clue a photograph of a woman no one in Sweden seems to know, he grows desperate to catch the killer before he strikes again.

=== Series 2 (2010) ===
No. overall	No. in series	Title	Directed by	Written by	Original release date	UK viewers (millions)
4	1	"Faceless Killers"	Hettie MacDonald	Richard Cottan	3 January 2010	6.33
Wallander investigates the brutal slaying of an elderly couple at an isolated farmhouse, while a police leak of the wife's dying words leads to an outbreak of racist reprisals in Ystad. The fallout from the case leads Wallander to doubt his abilities as a police officer.
5	2	"The Man Who Smiled"	Andy Wilson	Simon Donald & Richard Cottan	10 January 2010	6.02
Wallander is contacted by an old friend certain that his father has been murdered. Wallander refuses to get involved, as he is suspended from duty, but he soon becomes convinced that there is more to the case.
6	3	"The Fifth Woman"	Aisling Walsh	Richard Cottan	17 January 2010	5.25
An elderly bird-watcher falls to his death in a meticulously planned, brutal murder. In a seemingly unconnected case, a local man disappears and Wallander gets too close to one of the suspects. Wallander believes he is on the trail of a serial killer bent on revenge.

=== Series 3 (2012) ===
No. overall	No. in series	Title	Directed by	Written by	Original release date	UK viewers (millions)
7	1	"An Event in Autumn"	Toby Haynes	Peter Harness	8 July 2012	6.91
Wallander moves into a dream home with his new girlfriend. But his happiness is shattered when the skeleton of a girl is discovered in the garden. Wallander must try to get his life back on track by finding her killer, but the case is not as cold as he thinks.
8	2	"The Dogs of Riga"	Esther Campbell	Peter Harness	15 July 2012	5.78
After the bodies of two Eastern Europeans are washed ashore on a raft in Ystad, Wallander travels to Latvia in his hunt for the killers. Thrown into a cold, alien world of police surveillance and lies, Wallander finds himself entangled in a web of corruption with no one to trust.
9	3	"Before the Frost"	Charles Martin	Peter Harness	22 July 2012	5.01
A friend of Wallander's daughter comes begging for his help but then disappears. Meanwhile, an elderly woman's body is found cremated in a shallow grave. With the woman having been killed by a seemingly religious obsessive, Wallander must catch the culprit before he strikes again.

=== Series 4 (2016) ===
No. overall	No. in series	Title	Directed by	Written by	Original release date	UK viewers (millions)
10	1	"The White Lioness"	Benjamin Caron	James Dormer	22 May 2016	5.18
While in South Africa for a conference, Wallander becomes involved in the investigation of a Swedish citizen's disappearance.
11	2	"A Lesson in Love"	Benjamin Caron	Peter Harness	29 May 2016	4.45
After being attacked at night by three bikers, Wallander investigates the stabbing murder of a woman who had been having trouble with a nearby bikers' club.
12	3	"The Troubled Man"	Benjamin Caron	Peter Harness	5 June 2016	4.02
Despite the advancement of Alzheimer's, Wallander must solve the mystery of his daughter's missing-father-in-law and the death of the man's wife.

== Reception ==
=== Critical response ===
The series received a positive reception from critics, who praised both Branagh's performance and the character he played; in a preview of the BBC's Autumn season, Mark Wright of The Stage Online wrote that Branagh was "a good fit" for the character and had "high hopes for the success of [the] series". Previewing Sidetracked, The Times's David Chater called Branagh "superb as Kurt Wallander", and the series "one of those superior cop shows in which the character of the detective matters more than the plot". In a feature in The Knowledge, a supplement of The Times, Paul Hoggart called Branagh's performance "understated, ruminative, warm, sensitive and depressed" and wrote positively of the design and cinematography and concluded by writing that "Wallander is that rare treasure: a popular form used for intelligent, thoughtful, classy drama and superbly shot". At the time the series was commissioned, Scottish author Ian Rankin expressed disappointment to The Scotsman that BBC Scotland was producing adaptations of Swedish literature; "My main caveat is that there's so much good, complex and diverse Scottish crime writing going on right now that I'd like to have seen BBC Scotland pick up on that".

Reviewing Sidetracked after it aired, Tom Sutcliffe for The Independent called it, "often a visually dazzling experience, the camerawork as attentive to the contours of Branagh's stubbly, despairing face as it was to the Swedish locations in which the action took place or the bruised pastels of a Munch sunset". He praised Branagh's acting but felt the Wallander character was "shallower than the performance, the disaffection and Weltschmerz just another detective gimmick". The Guardian's Kira Cochrane was also complimentary to Branagh, calling him "faultless", but was not impressed with the scenes between Wallander and his father, which she believed slowed the pace of the film, as she did not want to learn Wallander's entire backstory immediately. Like Sutcliffe, Cochrane praised the cinematography and was pleased that the ending "tied up nicely". Andrew Billen of The Times wrote, "This distinctly superior cop show is both spare and suggestive, and brilliantly acted." He took time to adjust to Kenneth Branagh as Wallander, and found the warm blue skies of Sweden unexpected. Billen's and Cochrane's opinions of the child abuse storyline differed; Billen believed that it was "used too often in fiction, but here it meant something", though Cochrane called it a "familiar element". In The Daily Telegraph, James Walton was disappointed with the revelation that the crimes stemmed from sexual abuse; "once quite a daring TV subject, now a rather clichéd short cut to the black recesses of the human heart". Walton, like others, was complimentary of Branagh, and concluded by writing, "The series still probably won't appeal to fans of Heartbeat, but if you fancy an undoubtedly classy antidote to the cosy cop show, you could do a lot worse." The broadcast had an average 6.2 million viewers and 23.9% audience share. The episode began with a peak of 6.9 million (25.4%) but dropped to 5.8 million (24.6%) at the end. 57.2% of the audience was from the upmarket ABC1 demographic and 6.1% were in the age 16–34 demographic. The average viewer rating was down 300,000 on the same timeslot in the previous week. Final ratings, incorporating those who watched via DVR, was 6.54 million, making it the eighth-most-watched programme on BBC One that week. An editorial in The Independent complained that the episode's closing credits ran too fast; a hundred names were displayed in 14 seconds. Branagh called the speed of the credits "insulting". The actors' union Equity also complained to BBC director general Mark Thompson.

Firewall was seen by 5.6 million (23% share), 600,000 viewers and one share point down on the previous week. Final ratings boosted it to 5.90 million and the tenth-most-watched broadcast on BBC One that week. In The Guardian, Sam Wollaston wrote, "with the greyness, the cold, the Scandinavian sadness, and a troubled Kenneth Branagh mooching around in the gloom trying to figure out who killed these people so horribly, it's all pretty perfect." Andrew Billen wrote in The Times that Wallander and Ella's relationship not working out is conventional for a television detective drama, though liked how Wallander's depression "has grown out of the failure of his marriage and the experiences of his career". On TV Scoop website, John Beresford wrote that the episode "went quickly downhill" from the murder of the taxi driver in the opening minutes; "Pedestrian plots, characters that wander aimlessly about with next to nothing to do or say, and a format that seems better fitted for radio than it is for television. By that I mean the endless shots where there's a someone on the left of the screen, someone on the right, and they stand there for hours tal...king...verrrry...slow...ly to each other with absolutely nothing else happening." One Step Behind received overnight ratings of 5.6 million (22.4%). Final ratings were recorded as 5.66 million, making it the week's twelfth-most-watched programme on BBC One. David Chater's Times preview called Branagh "a masterpiece of vulnerability and despair". He wrote of the conclusion: "a climactic scene that has been done dozens of times in thrillers, on this one occasion it felt entirely believable". The Daily Record named it "Best of this week's TV" though it was criticised in The Herald; David Belcher called it "far worse than initially reckoned. Never has there been a less observant, more irritating fictional detective". Belcher hoped that no more adaptations would be made.

In a review called "Wåll-and-ör– den äkta Wallander" (the title is first poking fun at Branagh's pronunciation of Wallander while at the same time calling the version the real or proper Wallander), Martin Andersson of southern Sweden's main daily newspaper Sydsvenskan was very positive to Branagh's interpretation of Wallander, and thought the BBC series to be of better quality than the current Swedish-language series. He emphasised that not only was Branagh's performance of higher quality than the current Swedish Wallander actor Krister Henriksson, but the BBC series really understood how to use the nature and environment of the Skåne province to tell the proper story and added that, as a person from southern Sweden, he recognised all the settings and they had never looked as beautiful as in this production.

=== Awards ===
Branagh won the award for best actor at the 35th Broadcasting Press Guild Television and Radio Awards (2009). It is his first major television award win in the UK. The series was nominated for Best Drama Series but lost to The Devil's Whore. The series, represented by Sidetracked, won the British Academy Television Award for Best Drama Series. Richard Cottan, Branagh, Philip Martin and Francis Hopkinson are named as the nomination recipients. At the BAFTA Television Craft Awards, the series won four of five nominations: Martin Phipps for Original Television Music, Anthony Dod Mantle for Photograph & Lighting (Fiction/Entertainment), Jacqueline Abrahams for Production Design, and Bosse Persson, Lee Crichlow, Iain Eyre and Paul Hamblin for Sound (Fiction/Entertainment). Ray Leek was also nominated for his opening titles work.

In May 2009, PBS distributed promotional DVDs of One Step Behind to members of the Academy of Television Arts & Sciences for nomination consideration at the 61st Primetime Emmy Awards. The episode was not nominated, but Branagh was nominated for his performance in the Outstanding Actor, Miniseries or Movie category and Philip Martin was nominated for Outstanding Directing For A Miniseries, Movie Or A Dramatic Special. Branagh was placed on longlist in the Best Actor category of the 2010 National Television Awards. The series was nominated for The TV Dagger at the 2009 Crime Thriller Awards.

In November 2009, the Royal Television Society presented the series with two awards at the 2009 RTS Craft & Design Awards; Aidan Farrell at post-production house The Farm was presented with the Effects (Picture Enhancement) award, and Martin Phipps and Emily Barker with the Music (Original Title) award for the opening theme. Anthony Dod Mantle was also nominated in the Lighting, Photography & Camera (Photography)—Drama category, and Bosse Persson, Lee Crichlow, Iain Eyre and Paul Hamblin in the Sound (Drama) category. The series was nominated in the Best Drama Series/Serial category at the Broadcast Awards 2010. The International Press Academy nominated the series for the Satellite Award for Best Miniseries and Branagh for the Satellite Award for Best Actor – Miniseries or Television Film. The Hollywood Foreign Press Association nominated Branagh for the Golden Globe Award for Best Miniseries or Television Film for his performance in One Step Behind.

=== Impact on the Wallander franchise ===
In a Radio Times interview, Henning Mankell announced that he has a new Wallander book in the works. Several Swedish media outlets have speculated that the renewed Wallander interest in the UK and the warm reception of the BBC adaptations has sparked a new motivation in writing further Wallander novels; Mankell's last book starring the Ystad inspector was originally published in 1999. The new and final Kurt Wallander book, The Troubled Man, was published in Swedish in August 2009.

The increase in sales of the novels already published in the UK was also attributed to the television series.

=== Impact on Ystad ===
The series has resulted in a new interest among British tourists to visit Sweden, and especially Ystad and the rest of the Skåne province according to Itta Johnson, Marketing Strategist with Ystad County. Johnson reports that in the past British people were reluctant to visit Sweden since they saw the country as cold and expensive, but now questions are mostly about the light and the nature seen in the BBC series. Statistics Sweden reports that Skåne is the only Swedish region that has seen an increase in hotel visits during the first quarter of 2009. The largest increase in non-Scandinavian tourists is seen among Britons, who now count for 12% which is almost as large as the percentage of visitors from Germany, at 13%. In 2009, Ystad saw an increase of tourists from the UK with 18%, and local politicians credit the BBC Wallander series with attracting British tourists.

Johnson estimates that 2–3% of the people who watched the first series of Wallander on the BBC decided to visit the region. In 2008 tourism brought into Ystad 51 million Swedish kronor (c. £4.4 million) and with the influx of British tourists this number could very likely be higher for 2009.

"A lot of travel organisers from the UK call and want to include Ystad in what they can offer their clients" says Marie Holmström, tourism coordinator with Ystad tourism agency. "This year (2009) we have 30% more hotel bookings from Great Britain, compared to last year. Kenneth Branagh says many good things about this town and we have received many requests from British press". Jolanta Olsson, tourism coordinator with Ystad tourism agency, says they get many requests from visiting Britons concerning shooting locations and where the film crew reside.

Starting in October 2009, Ystad will start hosting a film festival with a focus on crime fiction. The festival is kick started with a marathon of series one and a speech by Yellow Bird producer Daniel Ahlqvist.

Ystad was awarded the 2009 Stora Turismpriset (The Great Tourism Award). "The brand of Ystad as a film- and tourism town has been strengthened due consequent and longsighted film investments" said Pia Jönsson- Rajgård, President of Tourism in Skåne.

== Merchandise ==
Vintage Books published paperbacks of the first three adapted novels in Series One with tie-in covers featuring Branagh on 20 November 2008. The Series One DVD was published by 2 Entertain Video on 26 December 2008. It features all three films, the Who is Kurt Wallander? documentary, and a 55-minute documentary entitled The Wallander Look. Half of The Wallander Look features Branagh and Mankell discussing Wallander. The DVD was released in the United States on 2 June 2009.

Tie-in editions of the novels adapted for Series 2 were published on 31 December 2009. The second series was released on DVD and Blu-ray on 8 February 2010.

No tie-in editions of the two full novels adapted for the third series were released, and the short story "An Event In Autumn" was not even available in English at the time.

The third series was released on DVD and Blu-ray on 23 July 2012. The fourth series was released on DVD in the US on 21 June 2016.

DVD releases
Season	Region 1	Region 2	Region 4
1	2 June 2009 19 October 2010 (Re-release)	26 December 2008	22 July 2013 (Re-release)
2	TBA	8 February 2010	5 January 2012
1–2	N/A	8 February 2010	2 February 2012
3	25 September 2012	23 July 2012	2 January 2013
1–3	N/A	23 July 2012	2 January 2013
4	21 June 2016	4 July 2016	5 October 2016
1–4	18 October 2016	4 July 2016	5 October 2016 28 October 2020 (Universal)
