= The Dogs of Riga =

Swedish detective mystery by Henning Mankell

- First edition (Swedish)
- Author: Henning Mankell
- Original title: Hundarna i Riga
- Translator: Laurie Thompson
- Language: Swedish
- Series: Kurt Wallander #2
- Genre: Crime novel
- Publisher: Ordfront
- Publication date: 1992
- Publication place: Sweden
- English publication date: October 2001
- Media type: Print (Hardcover, Paperback)
- Pages: 326 pp (Eng. hardback trans.)
- ISBN: 1-86046-839-X (Eng. trans.)
- OCLC: 48571208
- Preceded by: Faceless Killers
- Followed by: The White Lioness

The Dogs of Riga (Swedish: Hundarna i Riga) is a Swedish detective mystery by Henning Mankell, set in Riga, the capital of Latvia. It is the second book of the Kurt Wallander series, and was translated into English by Laurie Thompson.

The book was a finalist for the Los Angeles Times Book Prize for Mystery/Thriller.

== Plot ==
A lifeboat floats ashore at the coast of Skåne. Inside are two dead men who've been murdered. Policeman Kurt Wallander is assigned to the case. The men are identified with the help of the police in Latvia. One of their officers, Detective Liepa, travels to Sweden to assist the investigation, but when he returns to his home country he is mysteriously murdered. Kurt flies to Riga to find out why and is drawn into complex conspiracy.

== Adaptation ==
The novel was adapted into a theatrical film by Swedish public broadcaster Sveriges Television in 1995. Wallander is played by Rolf Lassgård. The film was directed by Per Berglund and released in the United States as The Hounds of Riga.

The novel also serves as the basis for an episode in the third season of the British production of Wallander starring Kenneth Branagh as the title character, and guest starring Søren Malling, Ingeborga Dapkunaite, and Anamaria Marinca.
