= The Man Who Smiled =

1994 novel by Henning Mankell

- First edition (Swedish)
- Author: Henning Mankell
- Original title: Mannen som log
- Translator: Laurie Thompson
- Language: Swedish
- Series: Kurt Wallander #4
- Genre: Crime, Mystery novel
- Publisher: Ordfront
- Publication date: 1994
- Publication place: Sweden
- English publication date: September 2005
- Media type: Print (Hardcover, Paperback)
- Pages: 336 pp (Eng. hardback trans.)
- ISBN: 1-84343-098-3 (Eng. trans.)
- OCLC: 60513794
- Preceded by: The White Lioness
- Followed by: Sidetracked

The Man Who Smiled (original: Mannen som log) is a novel by Swedish crime-writer Henning Mankell, and is the fourth in the Inspector Wallander series, although the English translations have not been published in chronological order.

== Synopsis ==
After killing a man in the line of duty (in The White Lioness), Inspector Kurt Wallander finds himself spiraling into an alcohol-fueled depression. He has just decided to leave the police when an old friend, Sten Torstensson, asks him to secretly investigate the recent death of his father in a car accident. At first Kurt dismisses his friend's suspicions as unlikely, but then Sten is found murdered in exactly the same manner as a Norwegian businessman shortly before. Against his previous judgement, Kurt returns to work to investigate what he is convinced is a case of double murder.

== Adaptations ==
In 2003, The Man Who Smiled was adapted by Swedish public broadcaster Sveriges Television into a two-hour television movie, starring Rolf Lassgård as Wallander. The Man Who Smiled has also been adapted into a 90-minute television episode for the BBC's Wallander series starring Kenneth Branagh as Wallander. It was first broadcast on 10 January 2010.
