= The Pyramid (short story collection) =

First edition (publ. Ordfront)

The Pyramid (orig. Swedish Pyramiden) is a collection of five short stories by Swedish crime fiction author Henning Mankell, first published in Sweden in 1999 and translated into English in 2008. It features his best-known character, police inspector Kurt Wallander.

While it was written after the 8th novel, Firewall, the events depicted in The Pyramid take place well before Faceless Killers, making it chronologically the first in the series. The first story takes place in 1969 while the last occurs in 1989-90.

The English translation of the titles for each of the short stories is:

- "Wallander's First Case"
- "The Man with the Mask"
- "The Man at the Beach"
- "The Death of the Photographer"
- "The Pyramid"

== Adaptation ==
In 2007, Swedish public broadcaster Sveriges Television in association with Tre Vänner Produktion produced a 90-minute straight-to-video adaptation of The Pyramid, starring Rolf Lassgård as the older Wallander and Gustaf Skarsgård as the younger Wallander.
