= Anna, I, Anna =

1969 novel by Klaus Rifbjerg

- First edition
- Author: Klaus Rifbjerg
- Original title: Anna (jeg) Anna
- Language: Danish
- Published: 1969
- Publisher: Gyldendal
- Publication place: Denmark
- Awards: Nordic Council Literature Prize of 1970

Anna, I, Anna (Danish: Anna (jeg) Anna) is a 1969 novel by Danish author Klaus Rifbjerg. It won the Nordic Council Literature Prize in 1970.
