= Witness to the Future =

1981 novel by Klaus Rifbjerg

- First-edition cover
- Author: Klaus Rifbjerg
- Original title: De hellige aber
- Translator: Steven T. Murray
- Language: Danish
- Publisher: Gyldendal
- Publication date: 1981
- English publication date: 1987

Witness to the Future is a novel written by Danish author Klaus Rifbjerg in 1981.

It is about two young boys who are playing in the woods outside Copenhagen in occupied Denmark in the Second World War. They discover a cave with a tunnel that leads them from 1941 to 1981. When they crawl out near a motorway, they run up against angry farmers, biker gangs, heroin addicts, and rabid dogs in a world that is close to nuclear war. They become involved in car theft, police chases, and the massive helicopter explosion.

It is Rifbjerg's only work of science fiction. A review in Publishers Weekly called the book an "allegory of the chaos and emptiness of modern times that conveys admiration for a simpler past."

The book was translated into English from the Danish original De hellige aber by Steve Murray in 1987.
