= Palimpsest: Documents From a Korean Adoption =

Graphic novel by Lisa Wool-Rim Sjöblom

Palimpsest: Documents From a Korean Adoption (Swedish: Palimpsest) is a graphic novel written by Lisa Wool-Rim Sjöblom (Korean: 정울림), a South Korea-born cartoonist who was raised in Sweden. It was originally published in Swedish in 2016 by Ordfront.

== Plot ==
It details her quest to discover her origins as, with the assistance of a Korean-speaking friend and her spouse, she navigates the bureaucracy and false statements in South Korean adoption papers supplied by agencies trying to mislead her.

== Reception ==
Karla Strand of Ms. Magazine stated that the book "challenges existing notions of adoption and identity while stressing the importance of owning your own narrative." Chris Gavaler of Popmatters wrote that the document-heavy approach of the work was atypical.

Publishers Weekly wrote that it was "An unflinching indictment of foreign adoption, Sjöblom’s story is also, ironically, an homage to the chosen family who help her find her first family." It describes portions as "text-heavy".

In 2019 Rachel Cooke of The Guardian described it as one of several "best graphic novels of 2019".

== Translations ==
Its English translation, published in 2019 by Drawn & Quarterly, was by Hanna Strömberg, Lisa Wool-Rim Sjöblom, and Richey Wyver.

It was published in Spanish, with Carmen Montes as the translator, by Barbara Fiore Editora as Palimpsesto in 2019.

== See also ==
- International adoption of South Korean children
