= Firewall (Mankell novel) =

1998 novel by Henning Mankell

- First edition (Sweden)
- Author: Henning Mankell
- Original title: Brandvägg
- Translator: Ebba Segerberg
- Language: Swedish
- Series: Kurt Wallander #8
- Genre: Crime novel
- Publisher: Ordfront
- Publication date: 1998
- Publication place: Sweden
- English publication date: 2002
- Media type: Print (Hardcover, Paperback)
- Pages: 436 pp (Eng. hardback trans.)
- ISBN: 1-84343-112-2 (Eng. trans.)
- Preceded by: One Step Behind
- Followed by: The Pyramid

Firewall (Swedish: Brandvägg) is a crime novel by Swedish author Henning Mankell. The novel was translated into English by Ebba Segerberg.

== Synopsis ==
A series of bizarre incidents sweep across Sweden: a man dies in front of an ATM, two young women slaughter an elderly taxi driver, a murder is committed aboard a Baltic Sea ferry, and a sub-station engineer makes a gruesome discovery while investigating the cause of a nationwide power cut. As Wallander investigates, he uncovers a sinister plan to bring the Western world to its knees.

== Adaptations ==
Lisa Siwe directed a 2006 screen adaptation of Firewall, starring Rolf Lassgård as Wallander. In 2008, British broadcaster BBC One broadcast a 90-minute adaptation as part of its Wallander television series starring Kenneth Branagh.
