= Klaus Rifbjerg =

Danish writer (1931–2015)

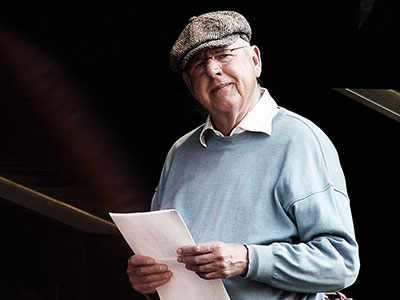
- Rifbjerg in 2009
- Born: 15 December 1931; Copenhagen, Denmark
- Died: 4 April 2015 (aged 83); Copenhagen, Denmark
- Occupation: Writer

Klaus Rifbjerg (15 December 1931 – 4 April 2015) was a Danish writer. He authored more than 170 novels, books and essays. In 1965 he co-produced the film 4x4 which was entered into the 4th Moscow International Film Festival.

== Biography ==
Rifbjerg was born in Copenhagen and grew up on the island of Amager, which is part of the city, the child of two teachers. Later he studied English and literature, in Copenhagen and for a year in the US at Princeton University.

His breakthrough was in 1958 with the novel Den kroniske Uskyld. It was made into a film in 1985, directed by Edward Fleming. From that time on he published more than 100 novels as well as poetry and short story collections, plays, TV and radio plays, film scripts, children's books and diaries. Rifbjerg is also known for having been a journalist and critic. Along with Villy Sørensen, he was editor of the publication Vindrosen, and from 1984 to 1991 he was the literary director of Gyldendal.

Among other honors, he was awarded the Swedish Academy Nordic Prize (1999), known as the 'little Nobel'; The Nordic Council's Literature Prize (1970), the Rungstedlund Award (2009) and the grand prize of the Danish Academy (1966).

Rifbjerg has been seen as the first true modernist author in Danish, as he became increasingly more experimental though the 1960s, culminating with Anna (jeg) Anna. Many of his works from 1970 and some 25 years on are seen as being looser in scope and composition, often humorous or sarcastic, often leaving the protagonist chaotically alone with his or her existential and psychological hangups, subtly exemplifying modernism as the breakdown of the normality of the bourgeoisie. A principal theme is the portrayal of children and their difficulties establishing their own identity. Rifbjerg's works from the 2000s opened a new line of inspiration: historic events.

On 4 April 2015 Rifbjerg died in Copenhagen after a long illness, aged 83.

== Works ==
- Under vejr med mig selv (1956)
- Efterkrig (1957)
- Den kroniske uskyld (1958); English translation Terminal Innocence by Paul Larkin (2015)
- Konfrontation (1960)
- Og andre historier (1964)
- Operaelskeren (1966)
- Lonni og Karl (1968)
- Anna (jeg) Anna (1969)
- Lena Jørgensen Klintevej 4 2650 Hvidovre (1971)
- Tak for turen (1975)
- De hellige aber (1981); English translation Witness to the Future by Steven T. Murray (1987)
- Falsk forår (1984)
- Tukuma (1984)
- Krigen (1991); English translation War by Steven T. Murray & Tiina Nunnally (1995)
- Nansen og Johansen (2002)
- Knastørre digte/Strohtrockene Gedichte (2009); German translation by Lutz Volke, edited by Paul Alfred Kleinert
