= The White Lioness =

1993 novel by Henning Mankell

- First edition (Swedish)
- Author: Henning Mankell
- Original title: Den vita lejoninnan
- Translator: Laurie Thompson
- Language: Swedish
- Series: Kurt Wallander #3
- Genre: Crime novel
- Publisher: Ordfront
- Publication date: 1993
- Publication place: Sweden
- English publication date: October 1998
- Media type: Print (Hardcover, Paperback)
- Pages: 372 pp (Eng. hardback trans.)
- ISBN: 1-86046-780-6 (Eng. trans.)
- OCLC: 43418392
- Preceded by: The Dogs of Riga
- Followed by: The Man Who Smiled

The White Lioness (Original: Den vita lejoninnan) is a crime novel by Swedish writer Henning Mankell. It is second in the Inspector Wallander series to be translated into English. Originally published in Swedish, it was translated by Laurie Thompson in 1998.

== Synopsis ==
The story itself takes place in 1992. The plot follows two parallel patterns, one during late apartheid South Africa where incumbent president F.W. de Klerk, leader of the Afrikaner minority which is on the brink of losing power to the African majority under the leadership of the ANC, about to end 44 years of suppression by the Broederbond rule. Simultaneously, Detective Chief Inspector Kurt Wallander is investigating a case of a missing female Methodist real-estate agent outside Ystad.

Upon the eventual recovery of her body, as well as the discovery of a severed black finger at the crime scene, Detective Chief Inspector Wallander realizes the case has deep roots in the history and current development in South Africa, where it appears that an extremist cell of the Broederbond is about to orchestrate the murder of de Klerk by an infamous black assassin, wishing to plunge the country into a long and devastating civil war.

== Publication ==
Mankell, who himself was deeply interested in questions concerning South Africa and its history and who used to reside in the country part-time, released the book in 1993 during the reign of the National Party and the Afrikaner rule.

== Adaptations ==
In 1996, The White Lioness was adapted by Swedish public broadcaster Sveriges Television into a theatrical movie, starring Rolf Lassgård as Wallander.

In 2016, The White Lioness was adapted by the BBC starring Kenneth Branagh as Wallander.
