= Depths (novel) =

2004 novel by Henning Mankell

- First edition
- Author: Henning Mankell
- Original title: Djup
- Translator: Laurie Thompson
- Language: Swedish
- Genre: Genre fiction
- Publisher: Leopard Förlag (Swedish); Harvill Secker (English)
- Publication date: 2004
- Publication place: Sweden
- English publication date: 2006
- Media type: Print (Hardcover, Paperback)
- ISBN: 1-84343-263-3 (Eng. trans.)
- OCLC: 67375286

Depths (Djup in the original Swedish) is a 2004 novel by Swedish writer Henning Mankell.

== Plot ==
Ever since his childhood Svartman has been obsessed by exactness in the measurement of time or distance. He seeks solace through secretly observing or following people, and at night overcomes fear by cradling his most precious possession, his sounding lead. Svartman's obsessions and growing distrust of others leads him to submerge himself in a web of deceit involving his employer, Kristina and Sara which increasingly threatens to engulf him.

== Reception ==
Writing in The New York Times, Lucy Ellmann criticised the novel's style, deprecating Mankell's writing as "woolly" and "staccato" and his use of metaphor and symbolism as overwrought. For The Guardian, Ian Thomson also criticised the writing as staccato and pretentious, but was more positive about the novel as a whole, praising the evocation of the Baltic seascape and the novel's "old-fashioned moral force". Paul Binding's review for The Independent mostly described the book's plot, but was uniformly positive about its narrative force.
