= Kennedy's Brain =

2005 novel by Henning Mankell

- First edition (Swedish)
- Author: Henning Mankell
- Original title: Kennedys hjärna
- Translator: Laurie Thompson
- Language: Swedish
- Genre: Thriller/Crime novel
- Publisher: Leopard förlag (Swedish); Harvill Secker (English)
- Publication date: 2005 (orig.)
- Publication place: Sweden
- English publication date: September 2007
- Media type: Print (Hardcover, Paperback)
- Pages: 320 pp (Eng. hardback trans.)
- ISBN: 978-1-59558-184-6 (Eng. trans.)
- OCLC: 154309109
- Dewey Decimal: 839.73/74 22
- LC Class: PT9876.23.A49 K4613 2007

Kennedy's Brain is a novel by Swedish writer Henning Mankell, that was originally published in the Swedish language in 2005. The English translation by Laurie Thompson was published in September, 2007.

With some elements similar to those of John le Carré's The Constant Gardner, Mankell's novel addresses the African HIV/AIDS epidemic, the pharmaceutical industry, and greed centered on the African epidemic. The protagonist is Louise Cantor, a Swedish archaeologist who on returning home from an excavation in Greece makes a tragic discovery. Louise embarks on a search for answers to explain why the tragedy has occurred. Her journey takes her to Australia, to Spain and to Mozambique.

== Critical reception ==
Reviewing Kennedy's Brain in The Independent, Paul Binding found that Henrik Cantor, "an idealistic young Swede" whose death, and its subsequent investigation by his mother Louise provides the narrative drive of the book, "has acknowledged that there exist those who, deliberately and using all their intelligence and money, seek to profit from the distress of others. Theirs is a wickedness hard rationally to comprehend, yet so linked to power and the bastions of the establishment that it is also hard to fight, let alone defeat. In this double predicament lie the strengths and the weaknesses of the novel". Binding added, "It presents Louise's wide-ranging, perilous investigation with button-holing intensity, unmatched even by this master of suspense. But the evil she meets is too vast, too ungraspable through the conventions of the thriller, for its representatives, despite their vividness, ever to transcend the dark "silhouettes" of Henrik's original perception. This is as true of victims as of villains. In contrast, Louise herself, her father, Artur, up north in Mankell's beloved forests of Härjedalen, and her hopeless but touching husband, Aron, are living beings about whom we can imaginatively care."

Writing in The Daily Telegraph, John Preston was less impressed saying, "It's getting harder and harder to know what to expect from Henning Mankell. For 10 years he produced a series of densely plotted, richly imaginative thrillers featuring his Swedish detective, Kurt Wallender. These were followed by a novel featuring Wallender's daughter, Linda, who followed her father into the police force. Sadly, though, both Wallenders seem to have been put permanently out to grass. Then last year came the gloomily symbolic non-thriller, Depths, which would have tried the patience of his most devoted admirers, and now here is perhaps his strangest book yet. It's a thriller, of sorts anyway, but one which offers little explanation of what's going on, and even less in the way of resolution". Preston added, "It would be giving too much away to reveal more, but suffice it to say that Kennedy's Brain bears certain thematic resemblances to John le Carré's The Constant Gardener. This, though, is the least of its problems. The main difficulty is that the indignation with which it is suffused – a note in the epilogue refers to how anger was Mankell's driving force when he was writing it – seems to have played havoc with his normally sure-footed exposition". He found the plot to be, "a succession of coincidences and fortuitous revelations which never gels, or develops any tension", before concluding that, "As usual with Mankell there are some great lines – 'Sorrow is like mice, it always finds a way in,' he notes at one point. All told, though, this is a disappointingly muddled affair".
