= The Return of the Dancing Master =

2000 novel by Swedish crime writer Henning Mankell

- First edition
- Author: Henning Mankell
- Original title: Danslärarens återkomst
- Translator: Laurie Thompson
- Language: Swedish
- Genre: Crime, Mystery novel
- Publisher: Ordfront (Swedish); Harvill Secker (English)
- Publication date: 2000 (orig.) & 2004 (Eng. trans. )
- Publication place: Sweden
- Media type: Print (Hardcover, Paperback)
- Pages: 466 pp (Eng. hardback trans.)
- ISBN: 1-84343-058-4 (Eng. trans.)
- OCLC: 59342736

The Return of the Dancing Master is a 2000 novel by Swedish crime writer Henning Mankell. It was translated into English in 2003 by Laurie Thompson, and won the 2005 Gumshoe Award for Best European Crime Novel, presented by Mystery Ink.

The book was a finalist for the Los Angeles Times Book Prize for Mystery/Thriller.

The central character of the book is Stefan Lindman, a young police officer with cancer, who investigates the murder of a retired officer. The plot explores the relationship between the German Nazi movement and the Neo-Nazis in modern Sweden.

A Swedish television adaptation was produced in 2004 starring Swedish actor Jonas Karlsson as Stefan Lindman. A German TV-film as well was produced same year, starring actor Tobias Moretti as Lindman and Maximilian Schell.
