= The Troubled Man =

2009 crime novel by Henning Mankell

- Leopard Förlag first edition cover, showing Wallander with his dog
- Author: Henning Mankell
- Original title: Den orolige mannen
- Language: Swedish
- Series: Kurt Wallander #10
- Genre: Crime fiction
- Publisher: Leopard förlag
- Publication date: 18 August 2009
- Publication place: Sweden
- English publication date: February 2011
- Media type: print (hardback)
- Pages: 500
- ISBN: 978-91-7343-265-8
- OCLC: 436914592
- Preceded by: The Pyramid

The Troubled Man (Swedish: Den orolige mannen) is a crime fiction novel by Swedish author Henning Mankell, featuring police inspector Kurt Wallander. It is the twelfth and final novel in the Wallander series. The pace of The Troubled Man is significantly slower than the previous Wallander stories, with several chapters between murders.

== Premise ==
A highly-decorated Swedish naval officer, Håkan von Enke, disappears during his daily walk. For Kurt Wallander this becomes a very personal case as Von Enke is Linda Wallander's father-in-law. The clues lead back in time to the Cold War and hired killers from Eastern Europe. Inspector Wallander suspects that he may be dealing with the worst spy scandal in Swedish history. At the same time, Wallander is also dealing with the onset of dementia, and in particular, with the loss of his memory.

== Background and writing ==
Henning Mankell had originally planned to write no more Wallander stories after the publication of the short story collection The Pyramid (Pyramiden) in 1999. However, the novel Before the Frost (Innan frosten) appeared in 2002, shifting the focus of the stories to Wallander's daughter Linda, who has joined the police force and is assigned to her father's station in Ystad. Mankell planned more novels focusing on Linda's police career but subsequently abandoned them after the death of Johanna Sällström, the actress who portrayed Linda in the Swedish Wallander TV series. Several years passed before Mankell decided there was one more Kurt Wallander story to tell, and this story forms the plot of The Troubled Man.

The naval aspect of The Troubled Man was inspired by the submarine incursions into Swedish territorial waters between 1982 and 1983, which Mankell considered the worst scandal in Swedish political history. These events were also the subject of Mankell's play Politik, which premiered at Helsingborg City Theatre on 7 October 2015. Mankell got the idea for the play while he was working on the novel, and the play's main character is the late Swedish prime minister Olof Palme, who also appears in the novel. The play starts on a submarine and ends in the aftermath of Palme's assassination. Mankell had stated that he hoped that Michael Nyqvist, known for his role in The Girl with the Dragon Tattoo, would play the lead.

== Publication history ==
A first edition run of 125,000 copies was published in Sweden by Leopard förlag on 18 August 2009 with plans for an immediate second impression due to the significant advance orders. In the United Kingdom, Harvill Secker, publisher of the British first editions of all the Wallander books, bought the rights to the translation in 2009. It was published in February 2011 under the title The Troubled Man. A Vintage paperback edition was published in 2012.

== Reception ==
In Dagens Nyheter, Lotta Olsson wrote that some clues were unaccounted for at the end of the novel, and had "an annoying suspicion that Mankell started typing without really knowing where the story is heading". Of the writing, Olsson believed Mankell had a "restrained, factual" style, but felt that the narrative was being "told by a person with concentration elsewhere". Olsson concluded by stating that although the ending, with its sense of things just "fading away", might have reflected the aging Wallander's reality, it was "not sufficiently interesting to read about". In Sydsvenskan, Eva Ström had a greater appreciation for the writing style: "Mankell pilots the reader through the plot with a secure hand." Ström identified a theme of the novel as "What happens when memory starts to weaken?" Both Olsson and Ström suspected that another Wallander story would follow The Troubled Man, despite Mankell's insistence to the contrary. Mankell, however, died in 2015.
