= Kurt Wallander =

Fictional Swedish police inspector

- Rolf Lassgård as Kurt Wallander in 2003
- First appearance: Faceless Killers
- Last appearance: The Troubled Man
- Created by: Henning Mankell
- Portrayed by: Rolf Lassgård; Lennart Jähkel; Krister Henriksson; Kenneth Branagh; Adam Pålsson; Gustaf Skarsgård

In-universe information
- Gender: Male
- Occupation: Police Officer
- Spouse: Mona Wallander
- Children: Linda Wallander
- Nationality: Swedish

Kurt Wallander (Swedish pronunciation: [vaˈlǎnːdɛr]) is a fictional Swedish police inspector created by Swedish crime writer Henning Mankell (1948 – 2015). He is the protagonist of many thriller/mystery novels set in and around the town of Ystad, 56 km (35 mi) south-east of the city of Malmö, in the southern province of Scania. Wallander has been portrayed on screen by the Swedish actors Rolf Lassgård, Krister Henriksson, and Adam Pålsson as well as the British actor Kenneth Branagh.

== Fictional character biography ==
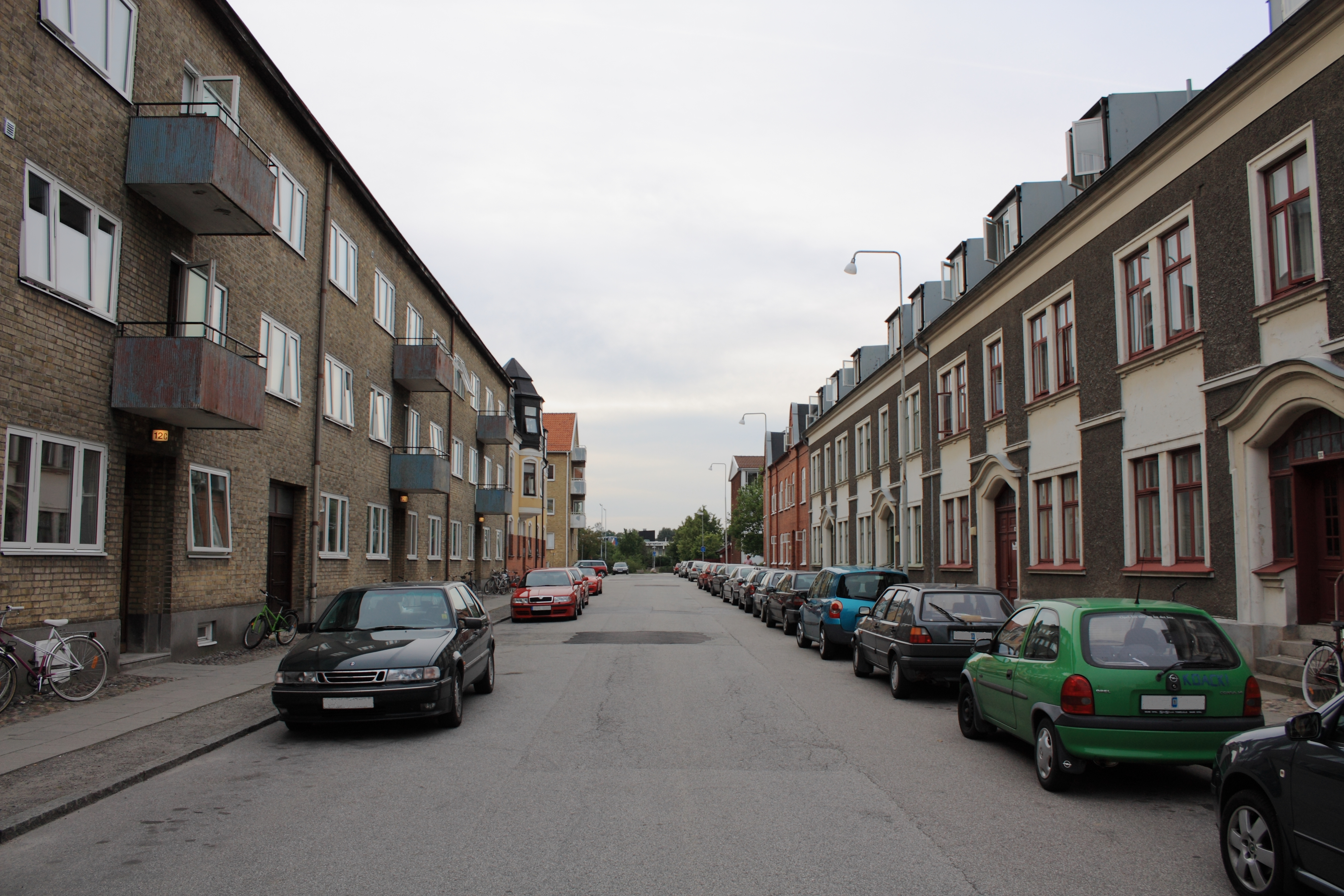
Wallander is said to live on Mariagatan in Ystad.

Wallander was born in 1948. His mother died when he was about 14. After completing national service, he joined the police. As a young police officer, he was nearly killed when a drunk whom he was questioning stabbed him with a butcher's knife (this is mentioned in the account of his first case). He has a sister, Kristina. Wallander was once married, but his wife Mona left him and he has since had a difficult relationship with his rebellious only child, Linda, who barely survived a suicide attempt when she was fifteen. He also has issues with his father, an artist who has painted the same landscape 7,000 times for a living; the elder Wallander strongly disapproved of his son's decision to join the police force and frequently derides him for it.

Wallander is a fan of opera; while in his car he regularly listens to recordings of opera singers such as Maria Callas, and when possible goes to opera performances, sometimes traveling to Copenhagen, Denmark for this purpose. At one time, Wallander had dreamed of making opera his life, leaving the police force and becoming the impresario of his friend, Sten Widén, a tenor who aspired to sing opera. But Widén's voice was not good enough and the plan did not materialize—a disappointment in Wallander's life (as in Widén's).

Inspector Wallander has few close friends and is known for his less-than-desirable lifestyle; he consumes too much alcohol and junk food, exercises very little, and sometimes struggles with anger. He frequently regards the crimes he investigates on a very personal level, throwing himself into catching criminals and going against the orders of his superiors to try to solve a case, often with negative effects on his emotional stability.

Over the years he has grown increasingly disillusioned with his work and often wonders whether he should have become a police officer at all. He was once falsely sued and harassed for police brutality and still lives with the guilt of having shot and killed a man in the fog, an act which drove him into depression and nearly led to his resignation. His relationships with his colleagues are tentative; they are alternately amazed by his intellect and frustrated by his brusque manner and aggressive tactics.

He is frequently at loose ends socially and with his family. After the breakup of his marriage, he had an affair with Annette Brolin, the prosecutor with whom he was working on some cases — but she was married and had children, and would not consider divorcing for his sake ("Faceless Killers"). In later years, he maintains a somewhat inconsistent romantic relationship with Baiba Liepa, a woman in Riga, Latvia, whom he met while investigating a murder there, until it eventually dissolves. Over the course of the series he is diagnosed with diabetes, and towards the end of his career he suffers from memory lapses, discovering he has developed Alzheimer's disease, with which his father was also afflicted.

== Novels ==
The following Kurt Wallander novels have been translated into English. They are listed in the order that they were originally published in Sweden:

1. Mördare utan ansikte (1991; English translation by Steven T. Murray: Faceless Killers, 1997)
2. Hundarna i Riga (1992; English translation by Laurie Thompson: The Dogs of Riga, 2001)
3. Den vita lejoninnan (1993; English translation by Laurie Thompson: The White Lioness, 1998)
4. Mannen som log (1994; English translation by Laurie Thompson: The Man Who Smiled, 2005)
5. Villospår (1995; English translation by Steven T. Murray: Sidetracked, 1999)
6. Den femte kvinnan (1996; English translation by Steven T. Murray: The Fifth Woman, 2000)
7. Steget efter (1997; English translation by Ebba Segerberg: One Step Behind, 2002)
8. Brandvägg (1998; English translation by Ebba Segerberg: Firewall, 2002)
9. Pyramiden (1999; short stories; English translation by Ebba Segerberg with Laurie Thompson: The Pyramid, 2008)
10. Handen (2004; novella; originally published in Dutch (2004) as Het Graf (The Grave). Published in Swedish, 2013. English translation by Laurie Thompson: An Event in Autumn, 2014)
11. Den orolige mannen (2009; English translation by Laurie Thompson: The Troubled Man, 2011)

The following novel features Wallander's daughter Linda in the lead, while he is a secondary character:

- Innan frosten (2002; English translation by Ebba Segerberg: Before the Frost, 2005)

It was intended as the first of a spinoff trilogy. However Mankell was so distraught after the suicide of Johanna Sällström, the actress playing the character at the time in the Swedish TV series, that he decided to abandon the series after only the first novel.

The order that the novels occur in the timeline of the series is shown below (with the title of the English translation shown in parentheses).

1. Pyramiden (The Pyramid)
2. Mördare utan ansikte (Faceless Killers)
3. Hundarna i Riga (The Dogs of Riga)
4. Den vita lejoninnan (The White Lioness)
5. Mannen som log (The Man Who Smiled)
6. Villospår (Sidetracked)
7. Den femte kvinnan (The Fifth Woman)
8. Steget efter (One Step Behind)
9. Brandvägg (Firewall)
10. Innan frosten (Before the Frost)
11. Handen (An Event in Autumn)
12. Den orolige mannen (The Troubled Man)

== TV and film ==
=== Lassgård films ===
Between 1994 and 2007, all nine Wallander novels published at the time were made into films in Sweden starring Rolf Lassgård as Wallander:

- Mördare utan ansikte [Faceless Killers], 1994
- Hundarna i Riga [The Dogs of Riga], 1995
- Den vita lejoninnan [The White Lioness], 1996
- Villospår [Sidetracked], 2001
- Den 5e kvinnan [The Fifth Woman], 2002
- Mannen som log [The Man Who Smiled], 2003
- Steget efter [One Step Behind], 2005
- Brandvägg [Firewall], 2006
- Pyramiden [The Pyramid] (video only), 2007

The final film Pyramiden features flashbacks to Wallander's past as a rookie cop, played by Gustaf Skarsgård.

=== Henriksson series ===
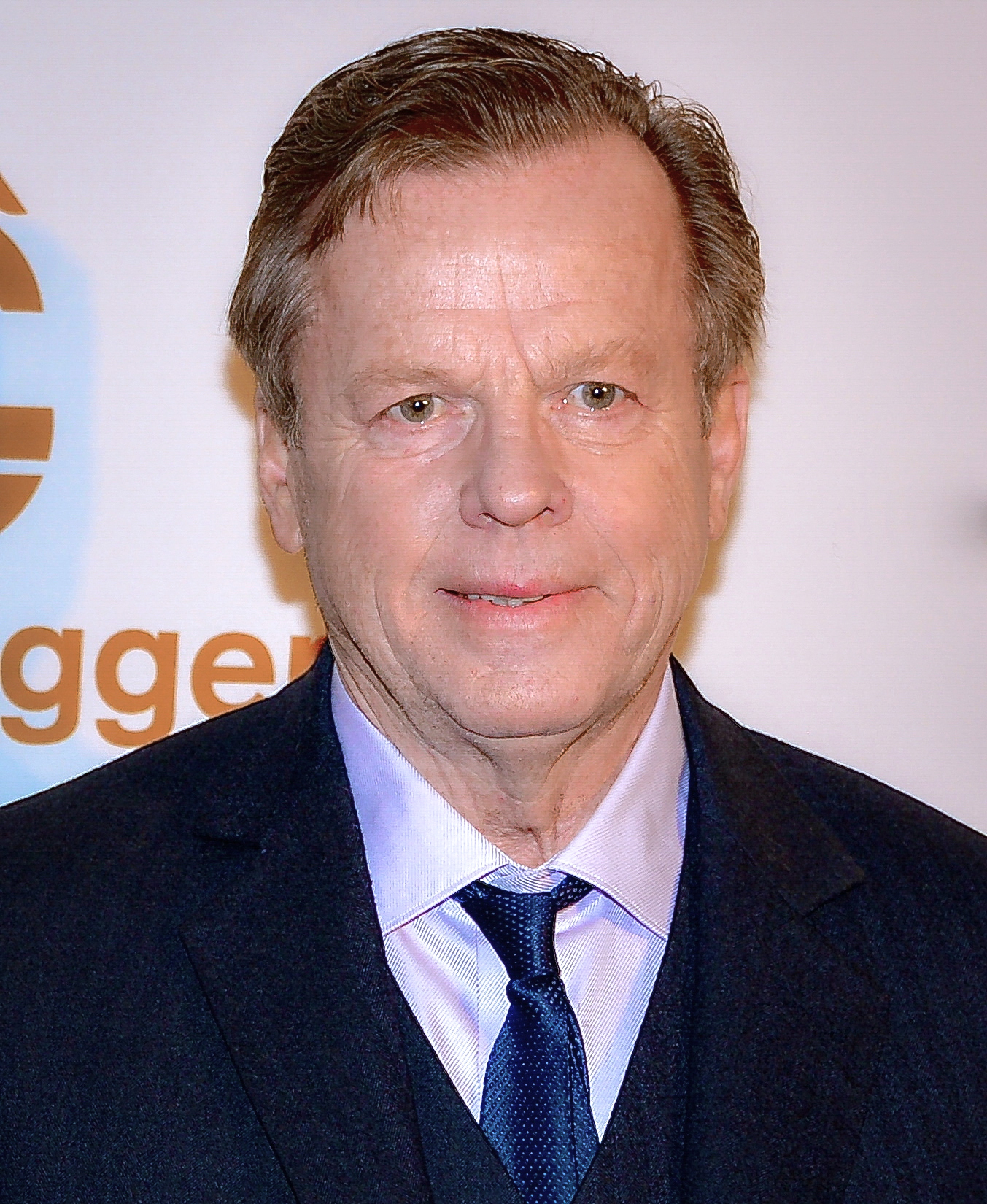
Krister Henriksson, who portrays Wallander in the Swedish TV series, pictured at the 48th Guldbagge Awards

From 2005 to 2006, 13 new stories, starring Krister Henriksson as Kurt Wallander and Johanna Sällström as Linda Wallander, were produced. The first film, based on Before the Frost, was released in cinemas. The rest are original stories not based on any of Mankell's books, and were released on DVD, with the exception of Mastermind which was also released in cinemas.

- Innan frosten [Before the Frost].
- Byfånen [The Village Idiot].
- Bröderna [The Brothers].
- Mörkret [The Darkness].
- Afrikanen [The African].
- Mastermind [Mastermind].
- Den svaga punkten [The Tricksters].
- Fotografen [The Photographer].
- Täckmanteln [The Container Lorry].
- Luftslottet [The Castle Ruins].
- Blodsband [Bloodties].
- Jokern [The Joker].
- Hemligheten [The Secret].

Two of these films were directed by BAFTA award-winning Swedish director Jonas Grimås, who outside Sweden is best known for his work on British television such as the 1990s crime drama Second Sight (Kingdom of the Blind) starring Clive Owen, police drama series Heartbeat, and Hamish Macbeth.

Yellow Bird announced in March 2008 that 13 new Swedish language Wallander films were to be made with Krister Henriksson. Production started in 2008. These new films were to have a more political slant than the previous films starring Henriksson. The first production in the second series, Hämnden [The Revenge], was given a cinematic launch in Sweden on 9 January 2009 before being released on DVD. The theme over the closing credits is "Quiet Night", sung by Anna Ternheim. The remaining were released on television:

- Hämnden [The Revenge].
- Skulden [The Guilt].
- Kuriren [The Courier].
- Tjuven [The Thief].
- Cellisten [The Cellist].
- Prästen [The Priest].
- Läckan [The Leak].
- Skytten [The Sniper].
- Dödsängeln [The Angel of Death].
- Vålnaden [The Phantom].
- Arvet [The Heritage].
- Indrivaren [The Collector].
- Vittnet [The Witness].

A third series consisting of six episodes was released in 2013. This is the last season with Krister Henriksson. In these final episodes, Kurt Wallander suffers from memory problems because of Alzheimer's disease, and he cannot continue to work as a policeman.

- Den orolige mannen
- Försvunnen
- Sveket
- Saknaden
- Mordbrännaren
- Sorgfågeln.

=== Branagh series ===
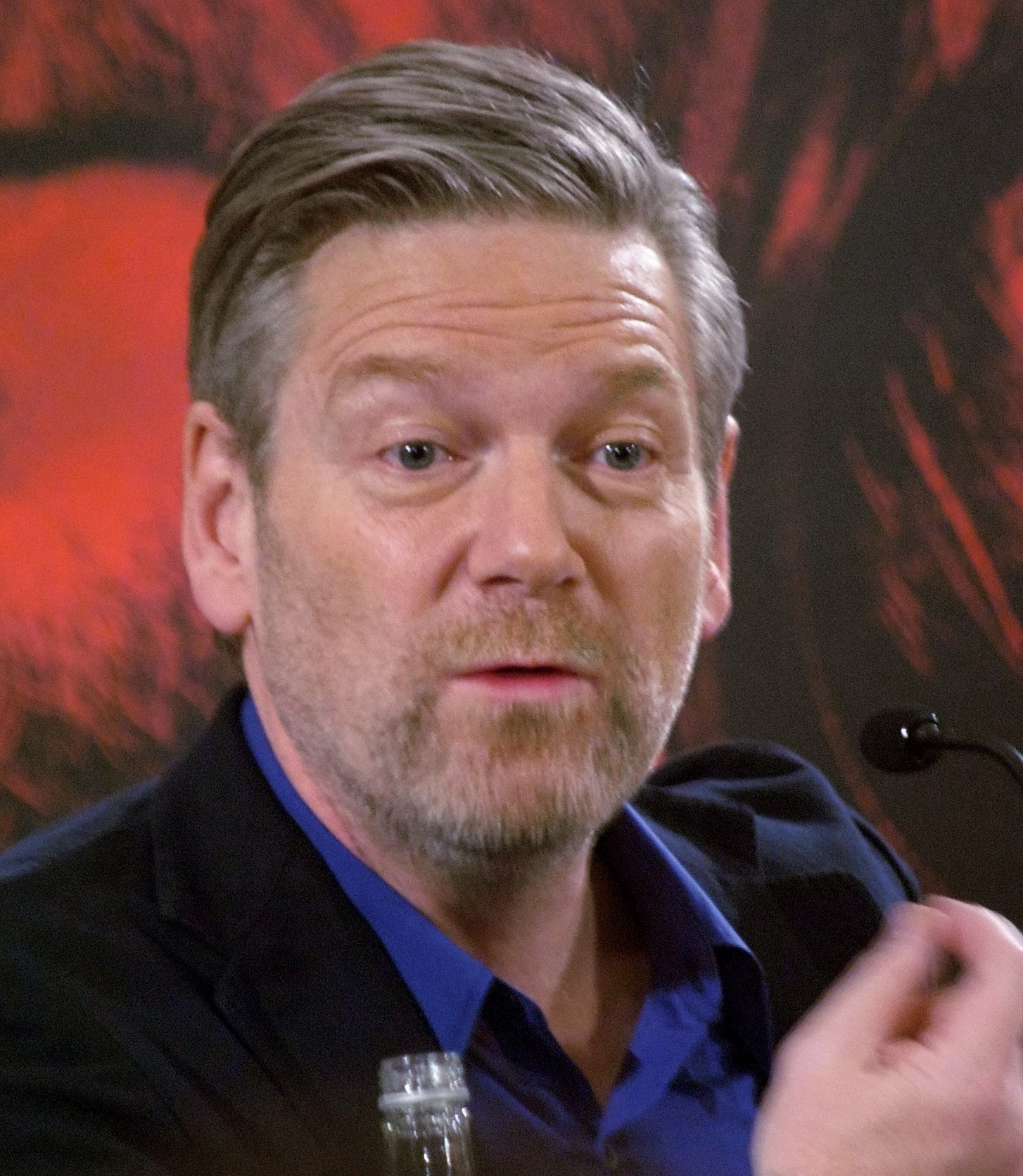
Kenneth Branagh in 2011

The novels have also been adapted as twelve television films for the BBC, produced by Yellow Bird and Left Bank Pictures. The series stars Kenneth Branagh as Wallander. The episodes have not been filmed in the order in which the original novels were published, resulting in changes to the backstories of the lead characters in the films. The first series consisted of the novels Sidetracked, Firewall and One Step Behind. These three were shot on location in Ystad in the summer of 2008, with a combined budget of £6 million ($12 million). They aired in late 2008 on the BBC.

A second series of Wallander adaptations was commissioned by the BBC from the same production team in 2008. Broadcast in January 2010, the second series was composed of adaptations of Faceless Killers, The Man Who Smiled, and The Fifth Woman.

The third series began shooting in Ystad and Riga, Latvia in the Summer of 2011 and continued into the winter. Broadcast in July 2012, it consists of adaptations of An Event in Autumn, The Dogs of Riga and Before the Frost. While the novel Before the Frost has Wallander's daughter Linda as its protagonist detective, the story was adapted for television so that Wallander himself became the lead.

The BBC Wallander series concluded in May 2016 with a three-episode fourth series consisting of an adaptation of The White Lioness and a two-episode adaptation of Mankell's final Wallander novel, The Troubled Man.

=== Special appearances ===
Mankell's friend and writer Jan Guillou used Kurt Wallander in the 10th book of his Carl Hamilton-series En medborgare höjd över varje misstanke [A Citizen Above Suspicion]. Guillou and Mankell also co-wrote the 2002 crime-drama mini series Talismanen where we also encounter Wallander as a supporting character, this time portrayed by Lennart Jähkel.

=== Young Wallander ===
Starting in September 2020, streaming service Netflix launched a new English-language series based on the character, entitled Young Wallander. The series depicts Wallander (Adam Pålsson) as a rookie detective in present-day Malmö, as opposed to the usual setting of Ystad. The show is not based on any of the novels, nor does it feature any of the familiar supporting characters from Mankell's works, save for Mona, Wallander's future wife.

Young Wallander is a Swedish-UK co-production, with Pålsson the sole Swedish actor, amidst a mostly British cast. In November 2020, the series was renewed for a second season.

=== Skarsgård series ===
A new Swedish series is in development from Jarowskij/Yellow Bird and Banijay Rights, set to air on TV4. It stars Gustaf Skarsgård, who had previously played the character in flashback scenes for the Rolf Lassgård film The Pyramid. The series will consist of three 90 minute episodes adapted from One Step Behind, Sidetracked and Faceless Killers. The directors will be Molly Hartleb, Pella Kågerman and Hugo Lilja, and the episodes scripted by veteran Wallander writer Antonia Pyk, Josefin Johansson and Jörgen Bergmark. The cast also includes Sophia Martinsson as Linda Wallander, Ana Gil De Melo Nascimento as Mona Wallander and Göran Ragnerstam as Wallander's father.

== See also ==
- Author Maj Sjöwall and Per Wahlöö's Swedish detective character Martin Beck
