= Ebba Segerberg =

Ebba Segerberg is an academic and translator, known for her translations of Swedish literature into English. She is the Director of Communications at Washington University in St. Louis.

== Education ==
Segerberg earned her Ph.D. from the University of California Berkeley, Department of Scandinavian in 1999. She has contributed to The Dictionary of Literary Biography: 20th Century Swedish Writers.

== Selected bibliography ==
=== Translator ===
- John Ajvide Lindqvist, Let the Right One In, St. Martin's Griffin/Thomas Dunne Books, New York, 2008 OCLC 861607086
- Henning Mankell, One Step Behind, New Press; Distributed by W.W. Norton, New York, 2002 OCLC 46976571
- Henning Mankell, Firewall, New Press : Distributed by W.W. Norton, New York, 2002 OCLC 49386342
- Henning Mankell, Before the Frost, New Press : Distributed by W.W. Norton, New York, 2005 OCLC 55801011
- Kjell Eriksson, The princess of Burundi, Thomas Dunne Books/St. Martin's Minotaur, New York, 2006 OCLC 60798547
- Kjell Eriksson, The Cruel Stars of the Night, Thomas Dunne Books/St. Martin's Minotaur, New York, 2007, OCLC 85692867
- John Ajvide Lindqvist, Let Me In, Thomas Dunne Books, New York, 2007 OCLC 141386300
- Henning Mankell, The pyramid : and four other Kurt Wallander mysteries, New Press : Distributed by W.W. Norton, New York, 2008 OCLC 227016607
- Kjell Eriksson, The hand that trembles : a mystery, Minotaur Books, New York, 2011, OCLC 682894495
- Henning Mankell, The Shadow Girls, New Press, New York, 2012, OCLC 778420274
- Ingrid Carlberg, Raoul Wallenberg ISBN 978-1848665965

=== Other publications ===
- Nostalgia, Narrative, and Modernity in Swedish Silent Cinema (author), Berkeley, University of California, Berkeley, 1999 OCLC 892826827
