= Laurie Thompson =

British academic and translator (1938 – 2015)

Laurie Thompson (26 February 1938 – 8 June 2015) was a British academic and translator, noted for his translations of Swedish literature into English.

Thompson was born in York, England, and lived in northern Sweden for a few years. He was the editor of Swedish Book Review between 1983 and 2002, and a lecturer at the University of Wales, Aberystwyth, and the University of Wales, Lampeter.

== Bibliography ==
- Quicksand by Henning Mankell, 2016
- The Man from Beijing by Henning Mankell, 2010
- Italian Shoes by Henning Mankell, 2009
- The Mind's Eye by Håkan Nesser, 2008
- Kennedy's Brain, by Henning Mankell, 2007
- The Return by Håkan Nesser, 2007
- Frozen Tracks by Åke Edwardson, 2007
- Shadows in the Twilight by Henning Mankell, 2007
- Borkmann's Point by Håkan Nesser, 2006
- The Man Who Smiled by Henning Mankell, 2006
- Depths by Henning Mankell, 2006
- Playing, Writing, Wrestling, six Swedish writers, 2006
- Never End by Åke Edwardson, 2006
- Sun and Shadow by Åke Edwardson, 2005
- A bridge to the stars by Henning Mankell, 2005
- Art Goes Underground, Art in the Stockholm metro, 2004
- I Die, but the Memory Lives on by Henning Mankell, 2004
- The Return of the Dancing Master by Henning Mankell, 2003
- Popular Music from Vittula by Mikael Niemi, 2003
- The Dogs of Riga by Henning Mankell, 2001
- Night Watch by Malin Lindroth, 2000
- After the Campfires by Per Jorner, 1999
- The White Lioness by Henning Mankell, 1998
- Johnny, my Friend by Peter Pohl, 1991
- Swedish State Cultural Policy, 1990
- Pithy Poems by Stig Dagerman, 1989
- The Black Period of Adalbert, 1988
- Stig Dagerman, 1983
- Swedish Proses, 1982
- People and Places, 1969

== Awards ==
- 2003 Swedish Academy award for introduction of Swedish culture abroad.
- 1986 Honorary Doctor at Linköping University
