= Wallander (film series) =

British crime films

Wallander is a film series based on the Kurt Wallander novels written by Henning Mankell that were adapted into multiple miniseries and TV films by Sveriges Television (SVT) between 1994 and 2006. These Swedish-language films starred Rolf Lassgård as Wallander. The final film Pyramiden (2007) features Gustaf Skarsgård as a younger Wallander. Skarsgard will star in his own Wallander series to be released in 2026-27.

== Film series ==
- Faceless Killers (Mördare utan ansikte). Made in 1994; directed by Per Berglund, with screenplay by Lars Bjorkman.
- The Dogs of Riga (Hundarna i Riga). Made in 1995; directed by Per Berglund, with screenplay by Lars Bjorkman. All of the Latvian scenes were filmed in Riga, while one scene was also filmed at the Hill of Crosses in Lithuania.
- The White Lioness (Den Vita lejoninnan). Made in 1996; directed by Per Berglund, with screenplay by Lars Bjorkman.
- Sidetracked (Villospår). Made in 2001; directed by Leif Magnusson, with screenplay by Henning Mankell.
- The Fifth Woman (Den 5e kvinnan). Made in 2002; directed by Birger Larsen, with screenplay by Klas Abrahamsson and Birger Larsen.
- The Man Who Smiled (Mannen som log). Made in 2003; directed by Leif Lindblom, with screenplay by Klas Abrahamsson and Michael Hjorth.
- One Step Behind (Steget efter). Made in 2005; directed by Birger Larsen, with screenplay by Klas Abrahamsson and Michael Hjorth.
- Firewall (Brandvägg). Made in 2006; directed by Lisa Siwe, with screenplay by Michael Hjorth.
- The Pyramid (Pyramiden). Made in 2007; directed by Daniel Lind Lagerlöf, with screenplay by Michael Hjorth. Released on video only.

== Series UK airdates and ratings ==
Episode	Originally aired UK BBC4	Official ratings	Repeat airdate	Official ratings	2nd Repeat airdate	Official ratings
The Man Who Smiled	Saturday 11 December 2010; 21.00	370,000	Saturday 8 October 2011; 21.00	399,000	Saturday 13 July 2013; 21.00	540,000
Firewall Part 1	Saturday 18 December 2010; 21.00	283,000	Saturday 29 October 2011; 21.00	<323,000	Saturday 20 July 2013; 21.00	421,000
Firewall Part 2	Monday 20 December 2010; 22.00	423,000	Saturday 5 November 2011; 21.00	<333,000	Saturday 27 July 2013; 21.00	455,000
One Step Behind	Sunday 26 December 2010; 21.00	416,000	Saturday 15 October 2011; 21.00	376,000		
The Pyramid	Saturday 1 January 2011; 21.00	480,000	Saturday 12 November 2011; 21.00	454,000	Saturday 3 August 2013; 21.00	491,000
Sidetracked Part 1	Saturday 28 July 2012; 21.00	609,000	Saturday 15 June 2013; 21.00	528,000		
Sidetracked Part 2	Saturday 4 August 2012; 21.00	416,000	Saturday 22 June 2013; 21.00	420,000		
The Fifth Woman Part 1	Saturday 11 August 2012; 21.00	410,000	Saturday 29 June 2013; 21.00	575,000		
The Fifth Woman Part 2	Saturday 11 August 2012; 21.55	377,000	Saturday 29 June 2013; 21.55	476,000		
The Fifth Woman Part 3	Saturday 18 August 2012; 21.00	652,000	Saturday 6 July 2013; 21.00	<424,000		
The Fifth Woman Part 4	Saturday 18 August 2012; 22.00	626,000	Saturday 6 July 2013; 22.00	424,000		
Faceless Killers Part 1	Friday 26 December 2014; 21.00	597,000				
Faceless Killers Part 2	Friday 26 December 2014; 21.55	568,000				
Faceless Killers Part 3	Thursday 1 January 2015; 21.00	490,000				
Faceless Killers Part 4	Thursday 1 January 2015; 21.55	<490,000				
The Dogs of Riga Part 1	Saturday 3 January 2015; 21.00	681,000				
The Dogs of Riga Part 2	Saturday 3 January 2015; 21.55	616,000				
The White Lioness	Monday 31 August 2015; 00.00	<366,000				

== Cast ==
- Rolf Lassgård as Kurt Wallander
  - Gustaf Skarsgård as Young Kurt Wallander
- Cecilia Zwick-Nash and Jenny Rudell as Linda Wallander
- Joakim Narin and Lars Melin as Martinsson
- Frederic Täckström and Christer Fant as Svedberg
- Siw Erickson as Ann-Britt Höglund
- Klas-Gösta Olsson, Lasse Pettersson, Sten Elfström and Anders Palm as Nyberg
- Marie Richardson as Maja
- Pia Örjansdotter as Robin
