= Steven T. Murray =

American translator (1943–2018)

- Born: 1943; Berkeley, California, U.S.
- Died: 2018 (aged 74–75)
- Other names: Reg Keeland; McKinley Burnett
- Education: Stanford University; California State University, Hayward
- Occupation: Translator

Steven T. Murray (1943–2018) was an American translator from Swedish, German, Danish, and Norwegian. He worked under the pseudonyms Reg Keeland and McKinley Burnett when edited into UK English. He translated the bestselling Millennium series by Stieg Larsson, three crime novels and two African novels by Henning Mankell, three psychological suspense novels by Karin Alvtegen, and works by many other authors. In 2001 he won the Gold Dagger Award in the UK for his translation of Sidetracked by Henning Mankell.

== Biography ==
Murray was born in Berkeley, California, and grew up in Oakland, Manila, Mexico City, and San Diego. He attended Stanford University on a General Motors National Scholarship and made his first trip to Europe in 1963 to study at Stanford-in-Germany in Beutelsbach near Stuttgart. He returned to Europe the next year with the Scandinavian Seminar to study at Krogerup Højskole in Humlebæk, Denmark, and later taught English conversation and American literature at Herning Højskole in Jutland. He received his BA in creative writing in 1972 from California State University, Hayward. His first paid published translations, two Norwegian science fiction stories by Jon Bing and Tor Åge Bringsværd in an anthology of European SF from DAW Books, appeared in 1976.

After seven years working in technical translation, editing, and foreign-language typography, Murray founded Fjord Press with Susan Doran and was editor-in-chief from 1981 to 2001 (Marin County, Berkeley, and Seattle), publishing mainly Scandinavian and German fiction in translation as well as a few American and British titles.

== Selected translations ==
=== From Swedish ===
- Enemy's Enemy by Jan Guillou, with Tiina Nunnally under pseudonym Thomas Keeland (1992)
- Faceless Killers by Henning Mankell (1997)
- Sidetracked by Henning Mankell (1999)
- The Fifth Woman by Henning Mankell (2000)
- Detective Inspector Huss by Helene Tursten (2002)
- Betrayal by Karin Alvtegen (2005)
- Shame by Karin Alvtegen (2006)
- The Girl with the Dragon Tattoo by Stieg Larsson under pseudonym Reg Keeland (2008)
- The Eye of the Leopard by Henning Mankell (2008)
- The Ice Princess by Camilla Läckberg (2008)
- The Girl Who Played with Fire by Stieg Larsson under pseudonym Reg Keeland (2009)
- The Crusades Trilogy 1: The Road to Jerusalem by Jan Guillou (2009)
- Shadow by Karin Alvtegen under pseudonym McKinley Burnett (2009)
- The Preacher by Camilla Läckberg (2009)
- The Crusades Trilogy 2: The Templar Knight by Jan Guillou (2009)
- The Girl Who Kicked the Hornets' Nest by Stieg Larsson under pseudonym Reg Keeland (2009)
- The Crusades Trilogy 3: Birth of the Kingdom by Jan Guillou (2010)
- The Stonecutter by Camilla Läckberg (2010)
- Daniel by Henning Mankell (2010)
- The Gallows Bird by Camilla Läckberg (2011)
- Nefilim by Åsa Schwarz (2011)

=== From Danish ===
- The Sardine Deception by Leif Davidsen, with Tiina Nunnally (1986)
- Witness to the Future by Klaus Rifbjerg (1987)
- Pelle the Conqueror, Vol. 1: Childhood by Martin Andersen Nexø (1989)
- Another Metamorphosis & Other Fictions by Villy Sørensen, with Tiina Nunnally (1990)
- Pelle the Conqueror, Vol. 2: Apprenticeship by Martin Andersen Nexø, with Tiina Nunnally (1991)
- War by Klaus Rifbjerg, with Tiina Nunnally (1995)

=== From Norwegian ===
- The Abduction by Mette Newth, with Tiina Nunnally (1989)
- Like Thunder: A Play by Niels Fredrik Dahl (produced 2001)
- A Wealth of Tradition: Jøtul, 1853–2003 by Dag Ove Skjold (2003)

=== From Spanish ===
- Queens of Havana: The Amazing Adventures of Anacaona, Cuba's Legendary All-Girl Dance Band by Alicia Castro with Ingrid Kummels, US edition (from German and Spanish) (2007)
- Anacaona: The Amazing Adventures of Cuba's First All-Girl Dance Band by Alicia Castro with Ingrid Kummels, UK edition (from German and Spanish) (2007)

=== From German ===
- The Philosopher's Kiss by Peter Prange (2011)
- Snow White Must Die by Nele Neuhaus (2013)
- Bad Wolf by Nele Neuhaus (2014)
- The Ice Queen by Nele Neuhaus (2015)
- To Catch A Killer, also known as I Am Your Judge, by Nele Neuhaus (2016)

== Awards ==
- Jens Peter Jacobsen Prize from the Limfjord Region Literary Society, Thisted, Denmark, for editing new translations of two classic works by Jens Peter Jacobsen (1994)
- Columbia Translation Center award for Witness to the Future by Klaus Rifbjerg (1985)
