= Gustaf Skarsgård =

Swedish actor (born 1980)

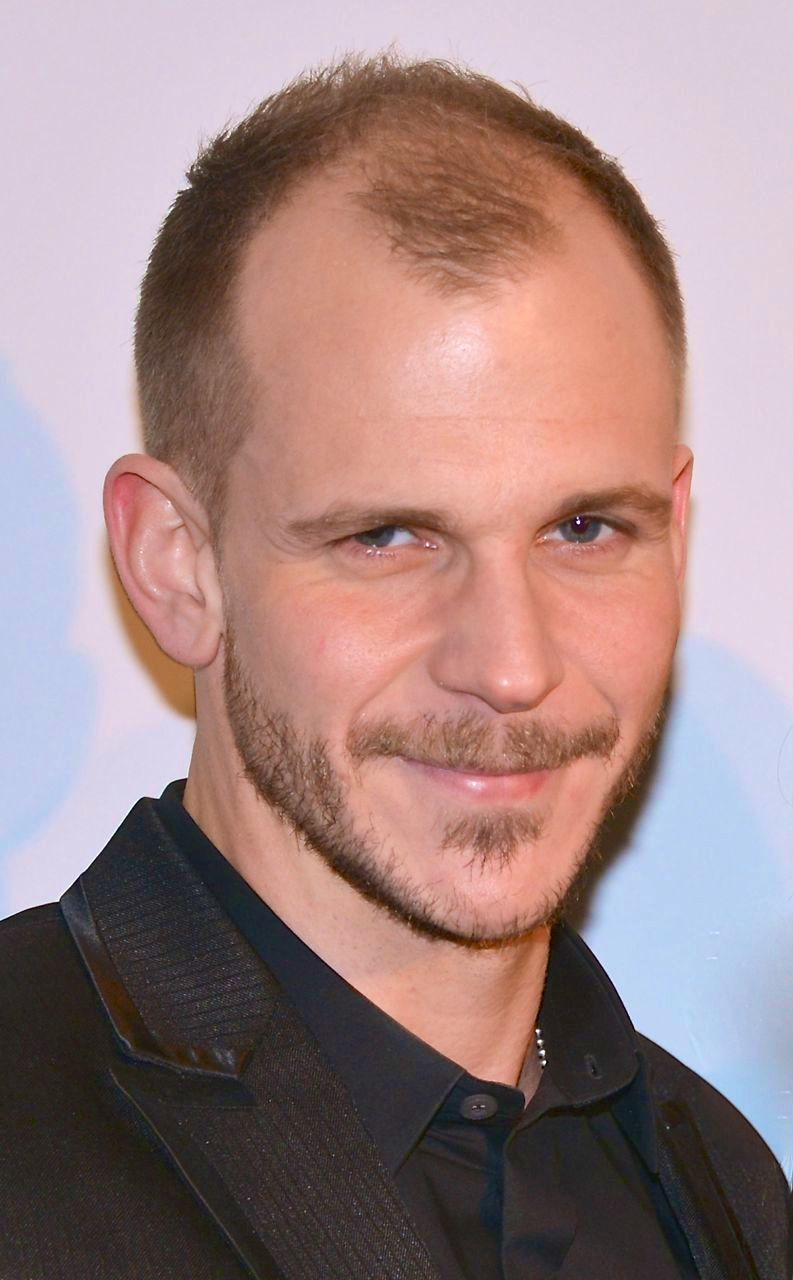
- Skarsgård in 2013
- Born: Gustaf Caspar Orm Skarsgård; 12 November 1980 (age 45); Stockholm, Sweden
- Occupation: Actor
- Years active: 1989–present
- Partners: Hanna Alström (1999–2005); Caroline Sjöström (2017–present)
- Children: 2
- Father: Stellan Skarsgård
- Relatives: Alexander Skarsgård (brother); Bill Skarsgård (brother); Valter Skarsgård (brother); Kolbjörn Skarsgård (half-brother)

Gustaf Caspar Orm Skarsgård (Note: Swedish pronunciation: [ˈɡɵ̂sːtav ˈskɑ̌ːʂɡoːɖ]) (born 12 November 1980) is a Swedish actor. He is known for his roles in Evil (2003), The Way Back (2010), Kon-Tiki (2012), and Oppenheimer (2023). He also appeared in the HBO TV series Westworld (2018), as Merlin in the Netflix TV series Cursed (2020), and as Floki in the History Channel series Vikings (2013–2020).

== Early life ==
Skarsgård was born on 12 November 1980 in Stockholm, Sweden, to Swedish actor Stellan Skarsgård and his first wife, My, a physician. He has 5 siblings: Alexander, Sam, Bill, Eija and Valter, and two half-brothers Ossian and Kolbjörn by his father's second marriage to Megan Everett. Alexander, Bill, Valter, and Kolbjörn are also actors. His godfather is Swedish actor Peter Stormare. Gustaf decided to follow in his father's footsteps as an actor at the age of six and attended drama school.

== Career ==
Skarsgård’s film debut was in 1989 in the short film Prima Ballerina, where he played a ballet pupil. The same year, Skarsgård starred in the Swedish Film Codename Coq Rouge. Gustaf Skarsgård continued with several children's and youth roles, for example, Min vän Percys magiska gymnastikskor (1994) and Skuggornas hus (1996).

He attended the Swedish National Academy of Mime and Acting in Stockholm (Teaterhögskolan) from 1998 to 2003, before joining the Royal Dramatic Theatre, Stockholm. He played in several of Shakespeare’s, Chekhov's and Söderberg’s works both on the Royal Dramatic Theatre and on Stockholm City Theatre. In 2003 he performed in Evil and 2008 in Patrik 1,5. For both roles he was nominated for the Guldbagge Award as Best Supporting Actor and as Best Leading Actor. The same year he was awarded the Shooting Star at the Berlin International Film Festival. He finally won the Guldbagge as Best Leading Actor for his performance in Förortsungar.

In 2008, he played Arvid Stjärnblom opposite Livia Millhagen's Lydia Stille in Daniel Lind Lagerlöf's stage directing debut of The Serious Game at Stockholm City Theater. The production received mixed reviews from critics.

In 2012, Skarsgård joined the History Channel's series Vikings in the main role of Floki, the shipbuilder. In 2018, he joined the cast of Westworld as Karl Strand for five episodes.

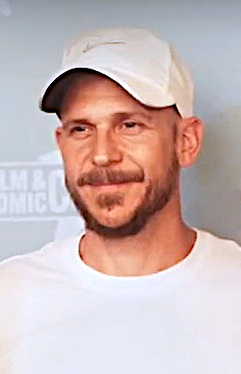
Skarsgård at GFCC Babelsberg 2024

In March 2020, Skarsgård starred in a main role as Merlin, in Cursed, a Netflix original television series based on a re-imaging of the Arthurian legend.

In 2022, Skarsgård starred in Swedish film What Remains, a psychological thriller which follows the disquieting relationship between a possible serial killer, played by Skarsgård (based on real-life killer Sture Bergwall, AKA Thomas Quick), his troubled psychiatrist, and the detective assigned to the case, played by Gustaf Skarsgård's own father, actor Stellan Skarsgård.

== Personal life ==
Skarsgård was in a relationship with actress Hanna Alström from 1999 to 2005. Since 2017, Skarsgård has been in a relationship with Caroline Sjöström, with whom he has a daughter, born in November 2020.

Skarsgård has protested the Israeli invasion of the Gaza Strip. He read the names of Palestinian children killed in Gaza at a protest in Stockholm in October 2024, and supported the Global Sumud Flotilla campaign in 2025.

== Awards ==
Skarsgård won a Guldbagge Awards for Kidz In da Hood. He won the European Film Academy's Shooting Stars Award in 2007.

== Filmography ==
=== Film ===
Year	Title	Role	Notes
1989	Prima ballerina	Spinken	Short
1989	Täcknamn Coq Rouge		
1995	Sommaren	Steffe	Credited as Gustav Skarsgård
1996	Euroboy	Robber	Short
2002	Kontrakt		Short
2002	The Invisible	Niklas	
2002	Gåvan	David	Short
2003	Evil	Otto Silverhielm	
2003	Detaljer	Daniel (old)	
2004	The Color of Milk	The Stranger	
2004	Babylonsjukan	Olle, Maja's boyfriend	
2006	Kidz in da Hood	Johan	
2007	Pyramiden	Kurt Wallander (aged 24)	Video
2007	Arn – The Knight Templar	King Canute I of Sweden	
2008	Iskariot	Adam	
2008	Arn – The Kingdom at Road's End	King Canute I of Sweden	
2008	Patrik, Age 1.5	Göran Skoogh	
2009	May Fly	Jimmy	Short
2010	Trust Me	Jon	
2010	The Way Back	Voss	
2011	Happy End	Peter	
2011	Människor helt utan betydelse		Director and writer
2012	Kon-Tiki	Bengt Danielsson	
2013	Autumn Blood	The Butcher	
2013	Vi	Krister	
2013	The Big Leap	John	Short
2013	The Galapagos Affair: Satan Came to Eden	Rolf Blomberg	Narration/voice
2017	Darling	Frans	
2019	438 Days	Martin Schibbye	
2021	The Emigrants	Karl Oskar	
2022	What Remains	Sigge/Mads Lake	
2023	Air	Horst Dassler	
2023	Oppenheimer	Hans Bethe	
2023	Last Ride	Syd	
2025	Black Bag	Philip Meacham	
2026	Adult Supervision	Bill	
2027	Exit to the Guillotine	Dado Levytskyy	
2027	The Fårö Cannibal		Director

=== Television ===
Year	Title	Role	Notes
1994	My Friend Percy's Magical Sneakers	Jan	TV miniseries
1996	Skuggornas hus	Julius "J.B" Bloomendolf	TV miniseries
2002	Cleo	Jonas No. 1	5 episodes
2003	Swedenhielms	Bo Swedenhielm	TV movie
2006	Snapphanar	King Charles XI of Sweden	TV miniseries
2008	Mellan 11 och 12	Jonas	TV movie
2010	Arn	Knut	4 episodes
2011	Bibliotekstjuven	John	TV miniseries
2013–2020	Vikings	Floki	Main cast; TV series
2014	Ettor & nollor	Karl	TV miniseries
2018	Westworld	Karl Strand	5 episodes
2020	Cursed	Merlin	Main role
2023	Evil	Åke Ponti	6 episodes
2025	To Cook a Bear	The Pastor	Main role
TBA	Wallander	Kurt Wallander	Main role

=== Theatre ===
Year	Title	Role	Theatre	Notes	Ref.
2001	Bash		Stockholm City Theatre	Backstage	
2008	The Serious Game	Arvid Stjärnblom	Stockholm City Theatre		
