= Ordfront =

Swedish publishing company

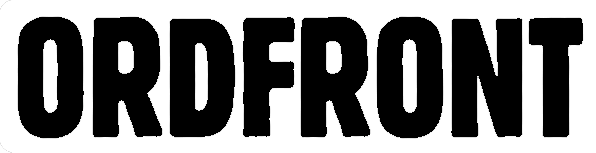

Ordfront (lit. Word Front) is a left-oriented Swedish publishing house, established in 1969. Except for the publishing of the magazine Ordfront, the association also organize courses and seminars. In 2006, the organisation had about 15,000 members and 20 local associations.

== Works ==
- Palimpsest (2016)
