= Sylling Church =

Church in Buskerud, Norway

- Sylling kirke
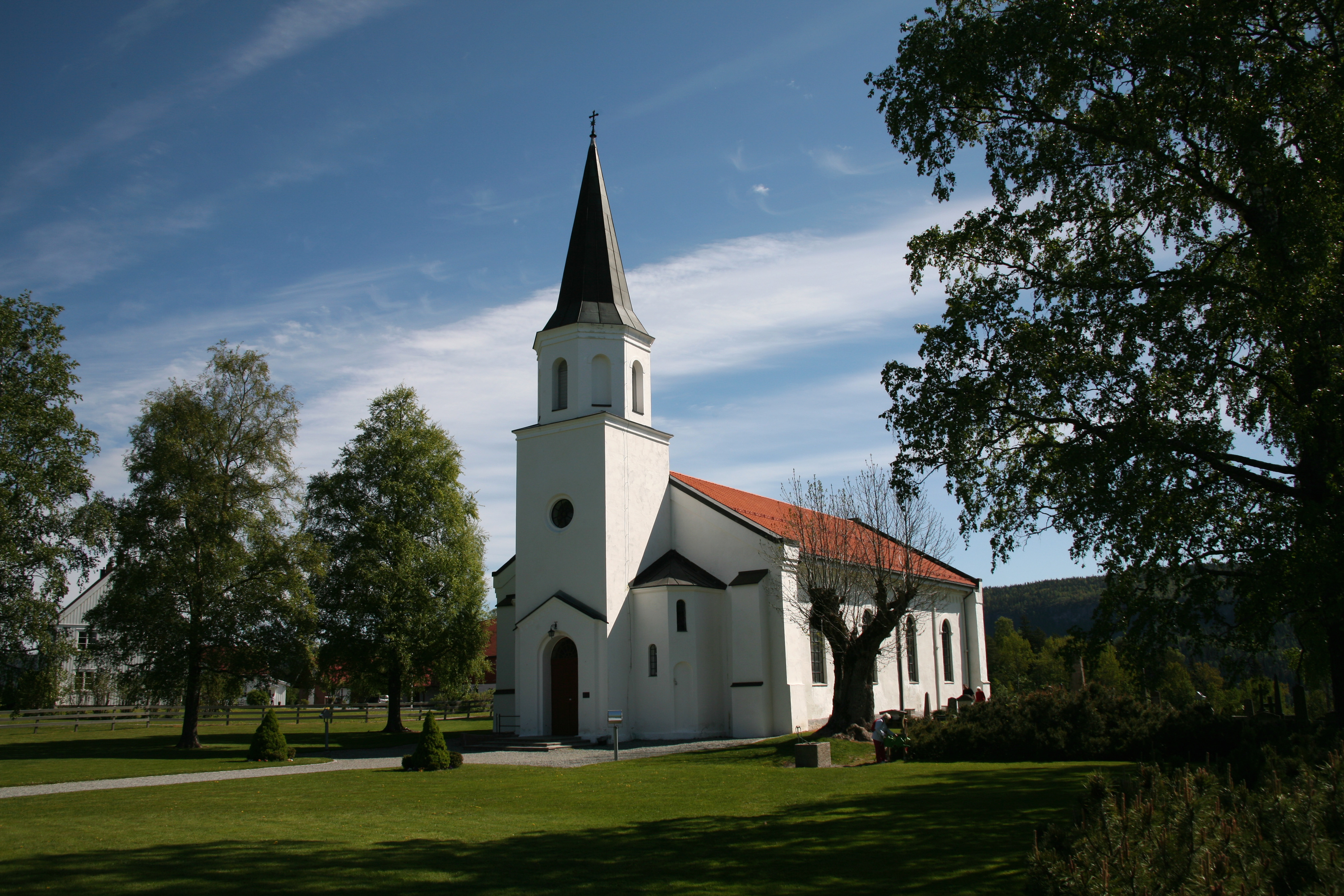
- View of the church
- Sylling Church
- 59°53′55″N 10°16′53″E
- Location: Lier Municipality, Buskerud
- Country: Norway
- Denomination: Church of Norway
- Previous denomination: Catholic Church
- Churchmanship: Evangelical Lutheran

History
- Status: Parish church
- Founded: c. 12th century
- Consecrated: 18 Feb 1852

Architecture
- Functional status: Active
- Architect: Christian H. Malling
- Architectural type: Long church
- Completed: 1852 (174 years ago)

Specifications
- Capacity: 305
- Materials: Stone

Administration
- Diocese: Tunsberg
- Deanery: Drammen og Lier
- Parish: Sylling
- Norwegian Cultural Heritage Site
- Type: Church
- Status: Automatically protected
- ID: 85025

Sylling Church (Norwegian: Sylling kirke) is a parish church of the Church of Norway in Lier Municipality in Buskerud county, Norway. It is located in the village of Sylling. It is the church for the Sylling parish which is part of the Drammen og Lier prosti (deanery) in the Diocese of Tunsberg. The white, stone church was built in a long church design in 1852 using plans drawn up by the architect Christian H. Malling. The church seats about 305 people.

== History ==
The earliest existing historical records of the church date back to the year 1400, but the church was not built that year. The medieval church was dedicated to Saint Margaret and it was consecrated on 10 April, but the year is unknown. The romanesque stone church had a rectangular nave and a narrower, rectangular chancel. The church, like most other churches in Norway, was sold into private ownership during the Norwegian church sale in 1723 to help the King pay off war debts. The old church was demolished in 1851.

After the demolition of the old church, a new church was built on the same site and a lot of the old stone was reused in the construction of the new church. It is also believed that a runestone that was in the old church and which disappeared in 1851 during the construction work, was incorporated into the walls of the new nave. Plans for the church were drawn up by Christian H. Malling. The church was consecrated on 18 February 1852. The new building was a stone long church with a rectangular nave and apsidal choir. In the eastern part of the nave there are separate sacristies: priest's sacristy in the north and baptismal waiting room in the south. A bell tower was built in 1877 using drawings by Henrik Nissen. Stone from the former church has been used in the walls of the nave, while the choir and tower are built in brick. All of the walls are coated in plaster.

== Media gallery ==

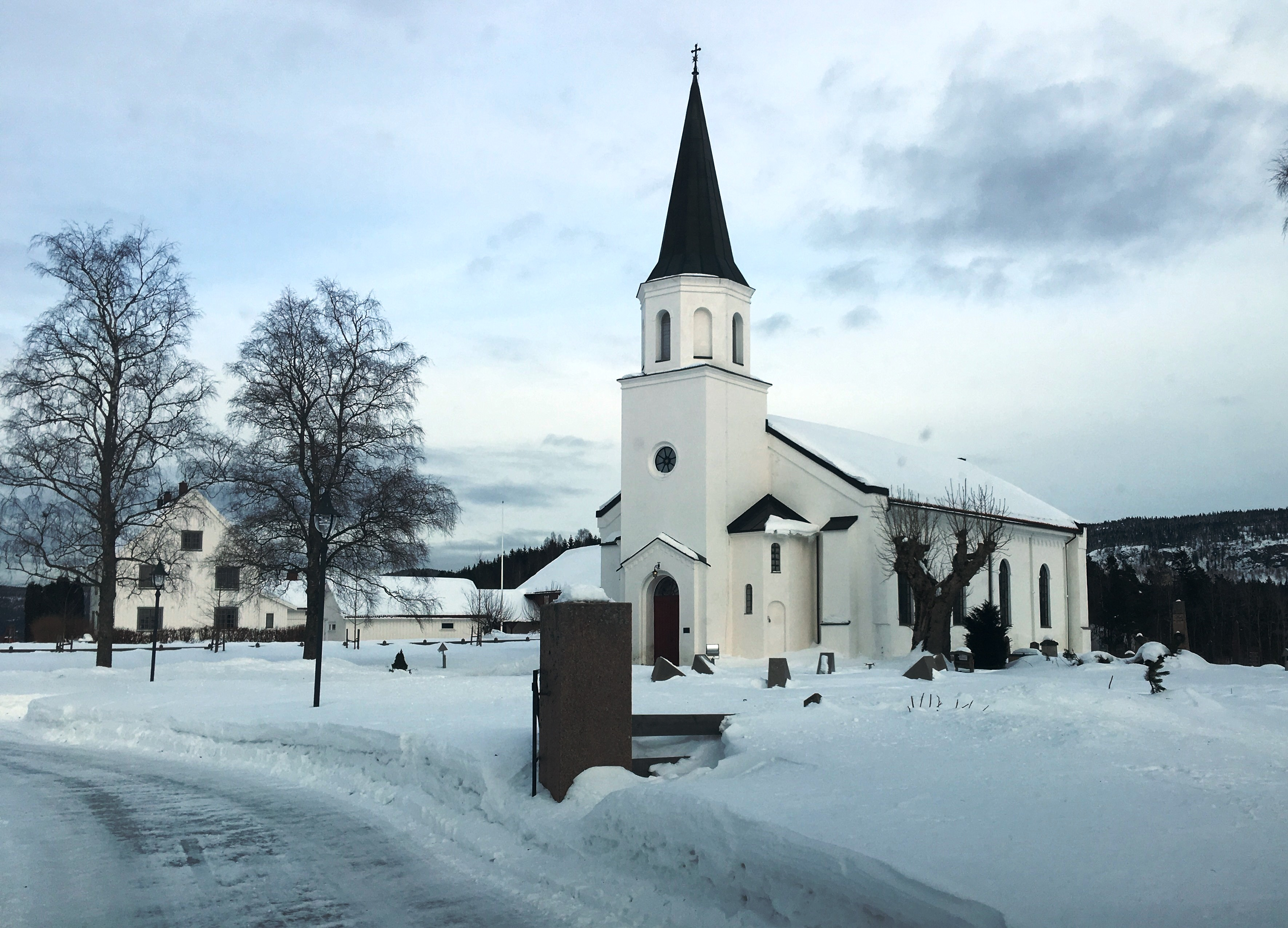

== See also ==
- List of churches in Tunsberg
