= Best Crime Novel in Swedish Translation =

Swedish crime fiction award

- Native name: Bästa översatta kriminalroman
- Awarded for: The best crime novel in translation.
- Description: Award for the best crime novel translated into Swedish.
- Country: Sweden
- Presented by: Swedish Crime Writers' Academy (Svenska Deckarakademin)
- Established: 1971
- Website: www.deckarakademin.org

The Best Crime Novel in Swedish Translation is an award given by the Swedish Crime Writers' Academy (Svenska Deckarakademin) for the best crime novel in translation . It is one of the most prestigious international crime-writing awards.

It was called The Martin Beck Award between 1996 and 2009, named after Martin Beck, a fictional Swedish police detective who is the main character in a series of ten novels by Maj Sjöwall (1935–2020) and Per Wahlöö (1926–1975).

== Winners ==
The country and year of the first publication in brackets.

=== 1970s ===
- 1971 – Julian Symons, The 31st of February, (UK, 1950)
- 1972 – Frederick Forsyth, The Day of the Jackal, (UK, 1971)
- 1973 – Richard Neely, The Walter Syndrome, (USA, 1970)
- 1974 – Francis Iles, Malice Aforethought, (UK, 1931)
- 1975 – Cornell Woolrich, Rendezvous in Black, (USA, 1948)
- 1976 – John Franklin Bardin, The Last of Philip Banter, (USA, 1947) and Devil Take The Blue-Tail Fly, (UK, 1948)
- 1977 – Leslie Thomas, Dangerous Davies: The Last Detective, (UK, 1976)
- 1978 – Anthony Price, Other Paths to Glory, (UK, 1974)
- 1979 – Brian Garfield, Recoil, (USA, 1977)

=== 1980s ===
- 1980 – Ruth Rendell, Make Death Love Me, (UK, 1979)
- 1981 – Sébastien Japrisot, One Deadly Summer, (L'Été meurtrier, France, 1977)
- 1982 – Margaret Yorke, The Scent of Fear, (UK, 1980)
- 1983 – Pierre Magnan, Death in the Truffle Wood, (Le Commissaire dans la truffière, France, 1978)
- 1984 – Len Deighton, Berlin Game, (UK, 1983)
- 1985 – Elmore Leonard, LaBrava, (USA, 1983)
- 1986 – John le Carré, A Perfect Spy, (UK, 1986)
- 1987 – Matti Joensuu, Harjunpää and the Tormentors, (Harjunpää ja kiusantekijät, Finland, 1986)
- 1988 – Scott Turow, Presumed Innocent, (USA, 1987)
- 1989 – Anders Bodelsen, Mørklægning, (Denmark, 1988)

=== 1990s ===
- 1990 – Ross Thomas, Chinaman's Chance, (USA, 1978)
- 1991 – Doris Gercke, Weinschröter, du musst hängen, (Weinschröter, du musst hängen, Germany, 1988)
- 1992 – Manuel Vázquez Montalbán, The Southern Seas, (Spain, 1979)
- 1993 – Tim Krabbé, The Vanishing, (Het gouden ei, Netherlands, 1984)
- 1994 – Maarten 't Hart, Het Woeden der Gehele Wereld, (Netherlands, 1993)
- 1995 – Scott Smith, A Simple Plan, (USA, 1993)
- 1996 – David Guterson, Snow Falling on Cedars, (USA, 1994)
- 1997 – Barry Unsworth, Morality Play, (UK, 1995)
- 1998 – Mary Willis Walker, Under the Beetle's Cellar, (USA, 1995)
- 1999 – Iain Pears, An Instance of the Fingerpost, (UK, 1997)

=== 2000s ===
- 2000 – Thomas H. Cook, The Chatham School Affair, (USA, 1996)
- 2001 – Peter Robinson, In a Dry Season, (USA, 1999)
- 2002 – Karin Fossum, Black Seconds, (Svarte sekunder, Norway, 2002)
- 2003 – Ben Elton, Dead Famous, (UK, 2001)
- 2004 – Alexander McCall Smith, The No. 1 Ladies' Detective Agency, (UK, 1998)
- 2005 – Arnaldur Indriðason, Voices, (Röddin, Iceland, 2002)
- 2006 – Philippe Claudel, Grey Souls, (Les Âmes grises, France, 2003)
- 2007 – Thomas H. Cook, Red Leaves, (USA, 2005)
- 2008 – Andrea Maria Schenkel, Tannöd, (Germany, 2006)
- 2009 – Andrew Taylor, Bleeding Heart Square, (UK, 2008)

=== 2010s ===
- 2010 – Deon Meyer, Devil's Peak, (Infanta, South Africa, 2004)
- 2011 – Denise Mina, The End of the Wasp Season, (Scotland, 2010)
- 2012 – Peter Robinson, Before the Poison, (Canada, 2011)
- 2013 – Dror Mishani, The Missing File, (Tik ne'edar, Israel, 2011)
- 2014 – Jørn Lier Horst, The Hunting Dogs, (Jakthundene, Norway, 2012)
- 2015 – Nic Pizzolatto, Galveston, (USA, 2010)
- 2016 – Ray Celestin, The Axeman's Jazz, (UK, 2014)
- 2017 – Ane Riel, Harpiks, (Denmark, 2015)
- 2018 – Thomas Mullen, Darktown, (USA, 2016)
- 2019 – Jane Harper, The Lost Man, (Australia, 2018)

=== 2020s ===
- 2020 – Deon Meyer, The Last Hunt, (Prooi, South Africa, 2019)
- 2021 – Guillaume Musso, La jeune fille et la nuit, (France, 2018)
- 2022 – Chris Whitaker, We Begin at the End, (UK, 2020)
- 2023 – Jo Callaghan, In the Blink of an Eye, (UK, 2023)
- 2024 – David Baldacci, A Calamity of Souls, (USA, 2024)

== See also ==
- MWJ Award for Mystery Fiction in Translation
