= Storsteinsfjell =

Mountain in Lier, Norway

Coordinates: 68°14′N 17°52′E

Geography
- Location: Buskerud, Norway

Storsteinsfjell is a mountain of Lier municipality, Buskerud, in southern Norway.
