= Gullaug Church =

Church in Buskerud, Norway

- Gullaug kirke
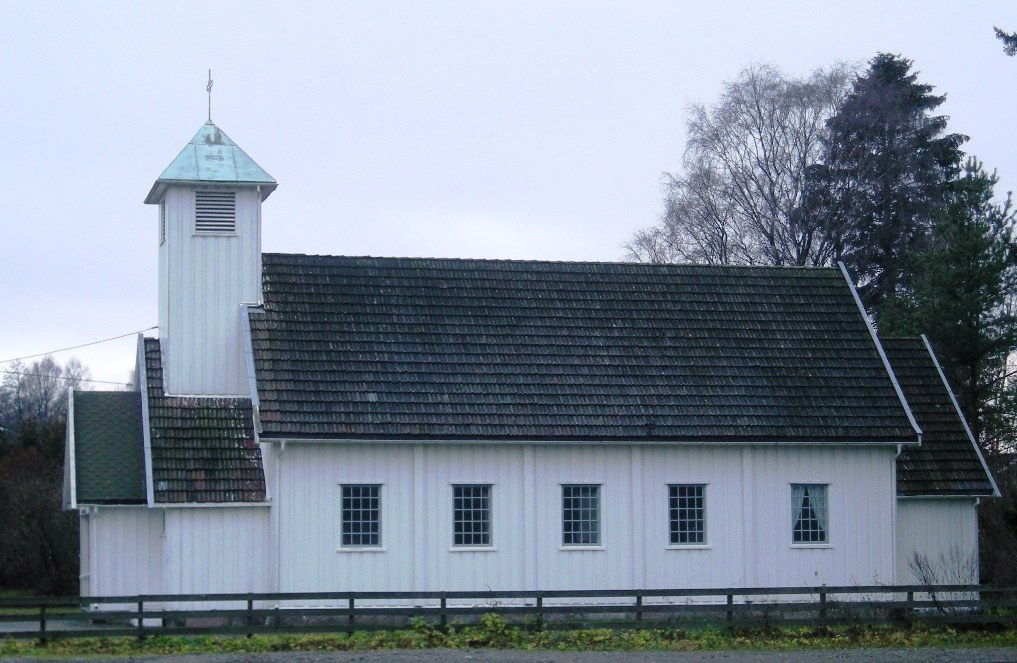
- View of the church
- Gullaug Church
- 59°44′56″N 10°16′35″E
- Location: Lier Municipality, Buskerud
- Country: Norway
- Denomination: Church of Norway
- Churchmanship: Evangelical Lutheran

History
- Status: Parish church
- Founded: 1905
- Consecrated: 25 Dec 1923

Architecture
- Functional status: Active
- Architectural type: Long church
- Completed: 1905 (121 years ago)

Specifications
- Capacity: 100
- Materials: Wood

Administration
- Diocese: Tunsberg
- Deanery: Drammen og Lier
- Parish: Frogner

Gullaug Church (Norwegian: Gullaug kirke) is a parish church of the Church of Norway in Lier Municipality in Buskerud county, Norway. It is located in the village of Linnesstranda. It is one of the churches for the Frogner parish which is part of the Drammen og Lier prosti (deanery) in the Diocese of Tunsberg. The white, wooden church was built in a long church design in 1905 using plans drawn up by an unknown architect. The church seats about 100 people.

== History ==
There was a small chapel at the Huseby farm (about 1.5 kilometres (0.93 mi) to the north) during the Middle Ages, but it fell into disuse during the Reformation and was probably demolished in the early 17th century. Then the lower part of Lier prestegjeld was without a church for about 300 years. In the early 1900s, money was collected for building a prayer house at Linnesstranda. The new building was constructed and on 17 September 1905, the new prayer house was opened. It was named "Bethel". The building was formally consecrated as a chapel on Christmas Day 1923. The name Bethel was used for a long time. The building was extensively renovated several times in the 1950s and 1970s. Ownership was transferred to the Frogner Church parish in 1988, and in 1993 the name was changed to Gullaug Chapel. In 1997 it was renamed Gullaug Church. The building is a log construction long church with approximately 100 seats. It has paneling both the outside and inside to cover up the log walls. The orientation is from southeast to northwest, and the church has a dormer over the entrance in the southeast.

== See also ==
- List of churches in Tunsberg
