= Tiina Nunnally =

American author and translator (born 1952)

- Born: August 7, 1952 (age 73); Chicago, Illinois, U.S.
- Occupation: Translator
- Spouse: Steven T. Murray

Tiina Nunnally (born August 7, 1952) is an American author and translator of Norwegian, Swedish, and Danish literature. She also writes her own novels and young adult books.

== Early life and education ==
Nunnally was born in Chicago, Illinois, and grew up in Milwaukee, Wisconsin, and St. Louis Park, Minnesota.

She was an AFS exchange student to Århus, Denmark in 1969 and 1970. In a 2010 interview with Joanne Matzenbacher, Nunnally said that she learned to speak Danish during this time as an exchange student.

She received an MA in 1976 from the University of Wisconsin-Madison and a PhC from the University of Washington in 1979.

She is an affiliate instructor with the Department of Scandinavian Studies at the University of Washington.

== Career ==
Nunnally is a translator of Danish, Norwegian, and Swedish, who sometimes uses the pseudonym Felicity David when edited into UK English. Her translation of Kristin Lavransdatter III: The Cross by Sigrid Undset won the PEN/Book-of-the-Month Club Translation Prize in 2001, and Peter Høeg's Smilla's Sense of Snow won the American Translators Association's Lewis Galantière Prize.

Her first novel, Maija, won a Governor's Writers Award from the State of Washington in 1996. Since then two more of her novels have been published.

The Swedish Academy honored Nunnally in 2009 with a special award for her contributions to "the introduction of Swedish culture abroad".

In 2013, Nunnally was appointed a Knight of the Royal Norwegian Order of Merit for her work in translating works from Norwegian to English.

In 2019, Nunnally's translation of the collected Norwegian folktales by Norwegian folklorists Peter Christen Asbjørnsen and Jørgen Moe was published by the University of Minnesota Press as "The Complete and Original Norwegian Folktales of Asbjørnsen and Moe", and included a foreword by Neil Gaiman. It was the first new English translation of the work in over 150 years, and the first English translation to include all 60 original folktales. In the edition's foreword, author Neil Gaiman wrote of Nunnally's translation, "Each story feels honed, as if it were recently collected from a storyteller who knew how to tell it and who had, in turn, heard it from someone who knew how to tell it." Nunnally's 2019 translation received considerable praise, from sources including the Journal of Folklore Research and the Wall Street Journal.

== Personal life ==
After 2002 she lived in Albuquerque, New Mexico, with her husband Steven T. Murray, both full-time freelance literary translators. Murray died in 2018.

== Selected translations ==
- Early Spring by Tove Ditlevsen, being the first two volumes of The Copenhagen Trilogy (from Danish) (1985)
  Reissued in 2021 with the third volume translated by Michael Favala Goldman.
- Niels Lyhne by Jens Peter Jacobsen (from Danish) (1990)
- American title: Smilla's Sense of Snow by Peter Høeg (from Danish) (1993)
  British title: Miss Smilla's Feeling for Snow, under the pseudonym Felicity David (1993)
- Kristin Lavransdatter I: The Wreath by Sigrid Undset (from Norwegian) (1997)
- Kristin Lavransdatter II: The Wife by Sigrid Undset (from Norwegian) (1999)
- Kristin Lavransdatter III: The Cross by Sigrid Undset (from Norwegian) (2000)
  Kristin Lavransdatter I–III reissued in one volume in 2005.
- Don't Look Back by Karin Fossum (from Norwegian) under the pseudonym Felicity David (2002)
- He Who Fears the Wolf by Karin Fossum (from Norwegian) under the pseudonym Felicity David (2003)
- Fairy Tales by Hans Christian Andersen (from Danish) (2004)
- When the Devil Holds the Candle by Karin Fossum (from Norwegian) under the pseudonym Felicity David (2004)
- Chronicler of the Winds by Henning Mankell (from Swedish) (2006)
- Pippi Longstocking by Astrid Lindgren, illustrated by Lauren Child (from Swedish) (2007)
- The Complete and Original Norwegian Folktales of Asbjørnsen and Moe (from Norwegian) (2019)
- Olav Audunssøn by Sigrid Undset (from Norwegian) (four volumes, 2020–2023)

== Honors and awards ==
- Knight, Royal Norwegian Order of Merit (2013)
- Award from the Swedish Academy for “the introduction of Swedish culture abroad” (2009)
- Independent Foreign Fiction Prize for The Royal Physician's Visit by Per Olov Enquist (2003)
- PEN/Book-of-the-Month Club Translation Prize, for Kristin Lavransdatter: The Cross by Sigrid Undset (2001)
- Washington Governor's Writers Award for her novel Maija (1996)
- Lewis Galantière Award from the American Translators Association for Smilla's Sense of Snow by Peter Høeg (1994)
- American-Scandinavian Foundation Translation Prize for Early Spring by Tove Ditlevsen (1985)
