= Under the Beetle's Cellar =

1995 suspense novel by Mary Willis Walker

- First edition (US)
- Author: Mary Willis Walker
- Language: English
- Genre: Suspense
- Publisher: Doubleday (US); Collins (UK)
- Publication date: 1995 (US), 1996 (UK)
- Publication place: United States
- Media type: Print
- Pages: 311
- ISBN: 0-385-46859-8
- Preceded by: The Red Scream
- Followed by: All the Dead Lie Down

Under the Beetle's Cellar, is a 1995 suspense novel by American author Mary Willis Walker, the second in her "Molly Cates" series.

== Title ==
The title is a line from "Under the Light, yet under", a poem by Emily Dickinson which features towards the end of the novel.

== Plot introduction ==
Set near Austin, Texas it tells of Samuel Mordecai, a fanatical self-proclaimed prophet who kidnaps a bus-load of schoolchildren and their driver, a Vietnam veteran. The captives are to be held underground for fifty days on starvation rations and without external contact as "earth purification" in preparation for the imminent end of the world. Surrounded by police and FBI, Mordecai's fortified compound is at the centre of world-wide media attention. Molly Cates is a journalist with the Lone Star Monthly, who interviewed Mordecai two years previously and is the only person outside the cult to have had any contact with him.

The book is set in the last four days of the siege and has two narrative streams: one of them underground, as the driver battles to keep up the spirit of the children and prepare for the end of the fifty days; the other follows Molly Cates as she investigates Mordecai's past to find a key to breaking his fanatical resolve as it becomes increasingly apparent that the children are to be sacrificed as part of his apocalyptic plan.

== Awards ==
- 1995 Hammett Award, awarded by the International Association of Crime Writers for "literary excellence in the field of crime-writing, as reflected in a book published in the English language in the US and/or Canada".
- 1996 Macavity Award awarded by Mystery Readers International for Best Mystery novel.
- 1996 Anthony Award awarded by the Bouchercon World Mystery Convention for Best Novel
- 1998 Martin Beck Award, awarded by the Swedish Crime Writers' Academy for the best crime novel in translation.

== Reception ==
- "Nail-biting suspense from the first page, masterfully extended to the last. Check your political sympathies at the door, stock up on your blood-pressure medication, and enjoy", Kirkus Reviews.
- "An absorbing tale filled with characters suffering from all too human flaws and strengths. This is a truly powerful and emotional novel that readers will find hard to forget", RT Book Reviews.
