= Chronicler of the Winds =

1995 novel by Henning Mankell

- First edition
- Author: Henning Mankell
- Original title: Comédia infantil
- Translator: Tiina Nunnally
- Language: Swedish
- Subject: Street children in Africa
- Genre: Novel
- Published: 1995 Ordfront; 2006 Harvill Secker (English)
- Awards: Novel prize of SR P1

Chronicler of the Winds (Original title: Comédia infantil) is a novel written by Henning Mankell in Swedish in 1995. The story is set in an unnamed port city in Africa which resembles Maputo, the capital of Mozambique, where the author often lived and worked. The narrator is a baker who finds a ten-year-old boy named Nelio. The boy has been shot on the stage of a theatre, and he tells the baker his life story and all his troubles, including living on the street, being persecuted for albinism, and being traumatized as a child soldier. Nelio is "presented as an inspirational figure" in a style derived from African storytelling. The novel was translated by Tiina Nunnally and published in English in 2006.

== Background ==
Mankell is known for his "socially aware crime fiction" with Inspector Kurt Wallander as a central character. He was fascinated by Africa where he traveled first in the 1970s. From 1987, he lived and worked in both Africa and Sweden. From 1986 on he was director of the Teatro Avenida in Maputo, Mozambique. In great contrast to the inspector, who has been described as "a morose, self-loathing plainclothes officer", the novel deals with the life of the street boy Nelio and his death at age ten. Mankell said that "the story unfolds in a manner derived from African storytelling". He favorably compared that style to what he considered that of the typical (chronological) European story: "The African way is much more adventurous. You can jump between realities. You can let dead people meet with living people".

== Plot ==
The story is set in an unnamed port city in Africa, told in the first-person by a baker, José M. V. He finds Nelio, a 10-year-old boy, shot on the stage of a theatre. He helps the wounded child who refuses medical care, and listens to the story the boy has to tell over the course of nine days before he dies.

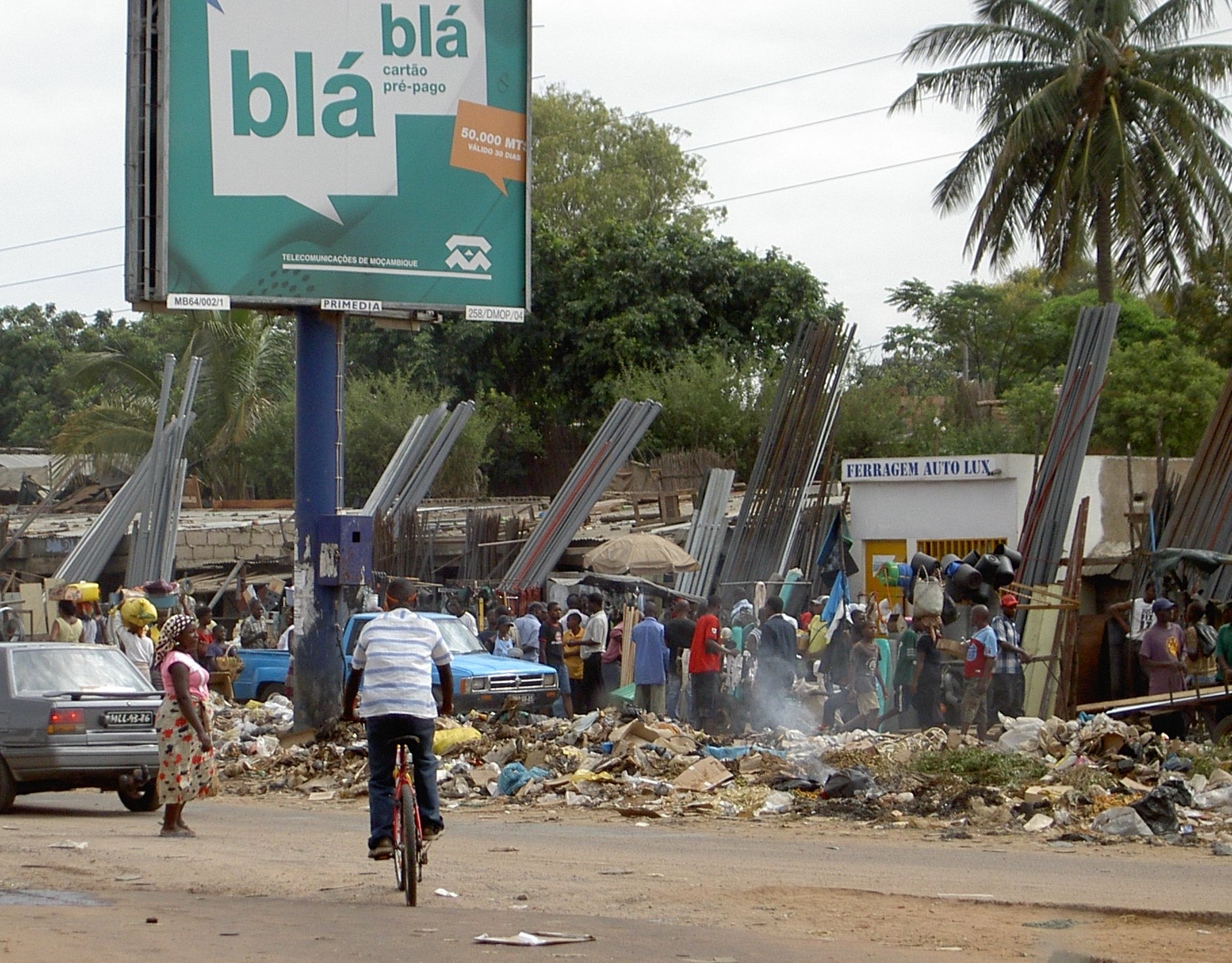
Market in Maputo

Nelio says he grew up in a village close to the border. The village was destroyed during a civil war by partisans, who killed his father, sister, and many others, and deported him and his mother to a camp from which he escapes. He meets Yabu Bata, who has albinism. Together they reach the sea, and Nelio alone moves to a port city. He lives as a street boy, sleeping in the monument of a rider. He joins a gang of other homeless street children led by a 14-year-old boy. They live off waste, stealing, and earning a little money by watching the cars of the rich. A happy event is the birthday of Alfredo Bomba, which they celebrate in an empty house of a man who travels.

Alfredo is diagnosed as terminally ill. To make his last days as pleasant as possible, the group wants to perform a play. Alfredo enjoys the performance in a theatre and dies. Watchmen notice the children and everyone is able to flee except Nelio, who stays with the corpse and is shot. Nelio dies nine days later. José decides to give up his profession and travel as the chronicler, telling Nelio's story, reasoning: "I kept asking myself: where does the evil in human beings come from? Why does barbarism always wear a human face? That's what makes barbarism so inhuman".

== Publication ==
The novel was published in 1995 by Ordfront in Stockholm. It was published in English, translated by Tiina Nunnally, in 2006 by Harvill Secker, and in several other languages.

== Reception ==
A reviewer in The Observer writes: "The genocide that forces Nelio out of his village and the degradation suffered by the street children are described in angry detail", but also sees that Nelio is "presented as an inspirational figure", even with magical powers. A reviewer for The New York Times notes "crisscrossing time and space in a story that is at once wrenchingly tragic and uplifting".

== Awards ==
The novel was nominated for the August Prize and the Nordic Council's Literature Prize in 1995. In 1996 it was awarded the novel prize of the Swedish broadcaster SR P1.

== Films ==
The novel became a 1998 Portuguese language film entitled Comédia infantil. The film, a Sweden–Portugal–Mozambique co-production, was nominated for a Guldbagge Award for best film in 1999. Mankell and director Jens Monath produced a film, Mein Herz schlägt in Afrika (My Heart Beats in Africa), which was aired in two parts by the ZDF in spring 2009. It was based on topics from the novel such as the life of street children, the persecution of people with albinism, and young adults who are traumatized by spending their childhood as child soldiers.
