= The Man from Beijing =

2008 novel by Henning Mankell

- First edition
- Author: Henning Mankell
- Original title: Kinesen
- Translator: Laurie Thompson
- Language: Swedish, English translation
- Genre: Crime novel
- Publisher: Leopard Förlag (Sweden); Harvill Secker (UK); Alfred A. Knopf (USA)
- Publication date: 20 May 2008 (Sweden); 10 January 2010 (UK); 16 February 2010 (USA)
- Publication place: Sweden
- Media type: Print (hardcover, paperback); E-book
- ISBN: 1-84655-257-5

Henning Mankell talks about The Man from Beijing on Bookbits radio.

The Man from Beijing is a novel by Swedish writer Henning Mankell first published in Swedish on 20 May 2008 under the title Kinesen (The Chinese). The English translation by Laurie Thompson was published in the UK on 10 January 2010, and in the US on 16 February 2010.

== Plot ==
In January 2006 the police make the gruesome discovery of the bodies of 19 people who have been brutally murdered in the remote hamlet of Hesjövallen in northern Sweden. The protagonist Birgitta Roslin, a district judge from Helsingborg, realises she has a family connection with some of the victims. Roslin's curiosity is raised by clues found at the scene and leads her to unofficially investigate the massacre. The narrative also chronicles the lives of several characters living during the mid-19th century in China and the United States, whose experiences are somehow also connected to the mass killings. As the plot unfolds, extending across four continents, Roslin unintentionally becomes embroiled in a web of international corruption and political intrigue.

== Adaptations ==
Yellow Bird acquired the TV film rights and produced a German language version together with Austrian production company Lotus Film and broadcasters ARD and ORF. It was broadcast in Austria by ORF on 30 December 2011, following DVD releases in Germany and France a few days earlier. The film was nominated for two German Camera Awards: to Alexander Fischerkoesen for Best Cinematography of a TV Film and to Moune Barius for Best Editing of a TV Film.

== See also ==
- Coolie
