= Lierskogen =

Village in Lier municipality, Norway

Coordinates: 59°48′57″N 010°18′22″E

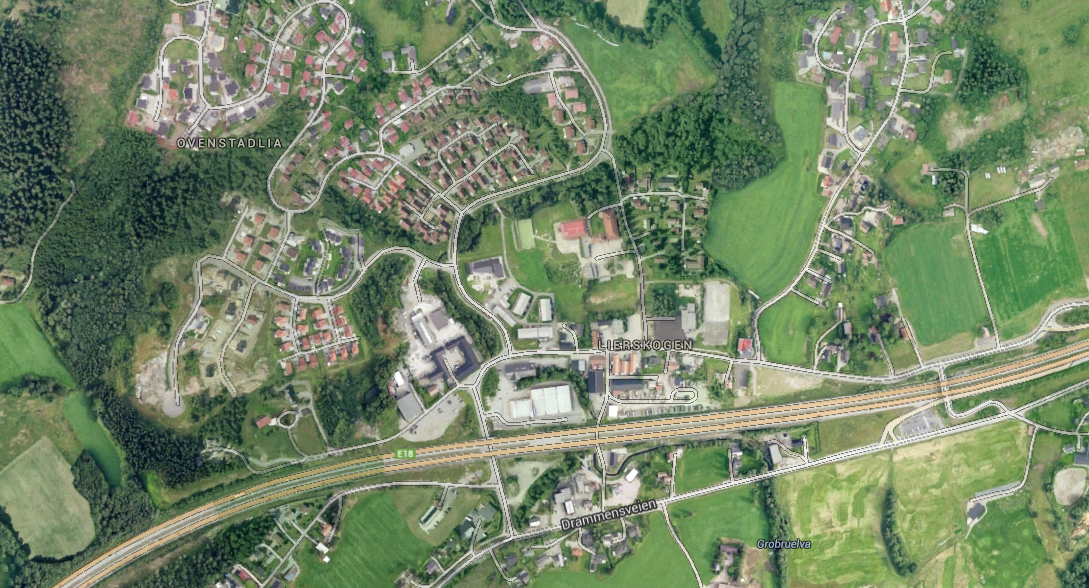
Lierskogen with the European route E18.

Lierskogen is the easternmost village of Lier municipality in Buskerud county, Norway. Lierskogen makes up the eastern part of Lier together with the nearby village of Tranby. It borders Asker to the east and Drammen to the west.

One of the busiest highways in Norway, European route E18 runs straight through the agricultural landscape of Lierskogen.

== Summary ==
Traditionally Lierskogen has been a place dependent on farming, but after World War II many new families have moved in. There are still dairy farms in the area; however non-agriculture work is scarce. Most resident have mostly been working in nearby places like Bærum, Asker, Dikemark, Drammen and Oslo.

The old village centre was situated near Lierskogen Church (Lierskogen kirke). The church dates from 1937. The edifice is masonry and seats 150. Around it was the several businesses: Gravdal bakery, Heia children school (for children aged 7–12), a post-office and a petrol station. In 1985 Lierskogen had a population of only 800 people. But it was around this time a great building boom began.

During the second half of the 1980s two major projects were built from scratch: Liertoppen, a shopping centre and pharmaceutical company Norsk Medisinaldepot. In 1987 Liertoppen was opened with two separate buildings and a large car park. An underground car park was also built under one of the buildings. In 1989 the two buildings were connected together with a bridge and then formed Norway's longest indoor shopping lane. In the 1990s the major building project was of several dozens new houses right behind Heia children school in the old village centre.

Even though this settlement and several smaller ones have tripled the population to 2,300 people, the commercial centre of Lierskogen has moved 1.5 km away, up to the Liertoppen shopping centre. Due to the close distance to other growing places like Drammen, Bærum, Asker and Oslo, Lierskogen has continued to grow.
