= Monsieur Linh and His Child =

French novella by Philippe Claudel from 2005

Monsieur Linh and His Child (French: La petite fille de Monsieur Linh) is a 2005 novella by French author Philippe Claudel. An English translation by Euan Cameron was published by MacLehose Press in 2011.

== Plot ==
Monsieur Linh is a Vietnamese refugee in France escaping an ongoing war in his country. His son and daughter-in-law were killed in an unspecified war, and he fled to France with his infant granddaughter, Sang Diû. Despite the language barrier, he befriends the widower Monsieur Bark, whom he meets on a park bench.
