= The Copenhagen Trilogy =

Series of memoirs by Tove Ditlevsen

- 2019 Penguin Classics covers
- Childhood (1967); Youth (1967); Dependency (1971)
- Author: Tove Ditlevsen
- Translator: Tiina Nunnally; Michael Favala Goldman
- Country: Denmark
- Language: Danish
- Discipline: Memoir
- Published: 1967–1971

The Copenhagen Trilogy is a series of memoirs by Danish author Tove Ditlevsen. The books were first released in Denmark between 1967 and 1971 under the titles Childhood (Danish: Barndom), Youth (Danish: Ungdom) and Dependency (Danish: Gift — Gift is the Danish word for both the adjective "married" and the noun "poison"). The first two volumes were translated by Tiina Nunnally and issued in 1985 by the feminist publisher Seal Press, under the title Early Spring. In 2019 the complete trilogy, with the third part translated by Michael Favala Goldman, was published as three individual books by Penguin Classics in the UK under the titles Childhood, Youth and Dependency. The memoirs were collectively called The Copenhagen Trilogy.

== Reception ==
The reissue of the memoirs in English was welcomed with critical praise.

The Guardian reviewed the series twice, calling it a "mordant, vibrantly confessional autobiographical work". A second review praised it as "raw and poignant" and compared the memoirs to Janet Frame's autobiographical trilogy An Angel at My Table. The Spectator called the trilogy "sharp, tough and tender". The trilogy was selected for The New York Times Book Review's "10 Best Books of 2021" list. In 2024, The New York Times ranked it #71 of the best 100 books of the 21st century.
