= Calling Out for You =

Novel by Karin Fossum

Calling Out For You
- First edition (Norwegian)
- Author: Karin Fossum
- Original title: Elskede Poona
- Translator: Charlotte Barslund
- Language: Norwegian
- Series: Inspector Konrad Sejer, #5
- Genre: Crime novel
- Publisher: Cappelen (Norway)
- Publication date: 2000
- Publication place: Norway
- English publication date: July 2005
- Media type: Print (Hardcover, Paperback)
- ISBN: 1-84343-213-7
- OCLC: 61856600
- Preceded by: When the Devil Holds the Candle
- Followed by: Black Seconds

Calling Out For You (Norwegian: Elskede Poona, 2000) is a novel by Norwegian writer Karin Fossum. It features her series’ protagonist, Inspector Sejer, and his investigation into the vicious murder of an Indian bride who recently moved to Norway to be with her husband.

The novel was translated into English in 2005 and was shortlisted for the 2005 Crime Writers' Association Gold Dagger award, where the judges acclaimed it for having "real emotional power." It was published in America in 2007 under the title The Indian Bride.
