= Henning Mankell (composer) =

Swedish composer (1868–1930)

- Born: Ivar Henning Mankell; 3 June 1868; Härnösand, Sweden
- Died: 8 May 1930 (aged 61); Stockholm, Sweden
- Occupation: Composer of piano works

Ivar Henning Mankell (3 June 1868 – 5 May 1930) was a Swedish composer, largely of piano works. He was born in Härnösand, studied at the conservatory in Stockholm from 1887 to 1895, and studied piano under Lennart Lundberg. He was a member of the Royal Swedish Academy of Music, and wrote music criticism for the Svenska morgonbladet and the Stockholms-tidningen. He gave private lessons in piano and music theory. He is also the grandson of Johan Hermann Mankell, the son of painter Emil Theodor Mankell, and the grandfather of author Henning Mankell. He died in Stockholm.

His compositions are primarily pieces for solo piano and for chamber ensembles including piano. He was influenced by French Impressionism.
