= Black Seconds =

2002 novel by Karin Fossum

- First edition (Norwegian)
- Author: Karin Fossum
- Original title: Svarte sekunder
- Translator: Charlotte Barslund
- Language: Norwegian
- Series: Inspector Konrad Sejer, #6
- Genre: Crime novel
- Publisher: Cappelen (Norway)
- Publication date: 2002
- Publication place: Norway
- English publication date: July 2008
- Media type: Print (Hardcover, Paperback)
- ISBN: 1-84655-018-1
- OCLC: 85830144
- Preceded by: Calling Out for You
- Followed by: The Murder of Harriet Krohn

Black Seconds (Norwegian: Svarte sekunder, 2002) is a novel by Norwegian writer Karin Fossum, the sixth in the Inspector Konrad Sejer series. The novel won Sweden's Martin Beck Award in 2002. An English-language edition translated by Charlotte Barslund was published in 2008.

== Plot ==
The story starts with Helga Joner's daughter Ida who leaves her home bound for the local shop riding a yellow bicycle and wearing a red cycle helmet. Helga is shown to be an over-anxious mother who worries excessively about her daughter. She even resorts to calculating the approximate time Ida will take to reach the shop.

As night starts to fall, and Ida doesn't return, Helga becomes worried about her daughter, going so far as to phone the shop to see if Ida is there, but she is told that Ida never arrived. Helga calls her sister Ruth who lives in the neighbourhood. Together they search for Ida but to no avail. Finally they call the police and also Helga's ex-husband Anders.

Then community starts to search for Ida, but there is no sign of her. Ten days later Ida's body is found lying on the road side, but she is not wearing the clothes she was wearing the day she left her home and instead is wearing a nightgown. The same day Inspector Sejer notices an envelope at Ida's home with a bird feather in it which ultimately proves to be a vital link in finding her murderer.

We learn that Ruth's son Tomme had an accident in his car at almost the same time Ida went missing.

Another important character in the novel is a man called Emil, who doesn't speak at all and answers only through gestures and the word NO. He is well known in the town for owning a three-wheeler bike and trailer.

Tomme's friend Willy is disliked by Tomme's mother Ruth because of Willy's involvement in some notorious activities like drug-dealing, but Tomme owes him a lot because Willy helped mend his car after the accident.

Tomme has a secret which is evident from his behaviour, which worries his mother.

Emil's mother has noted that her son is behaving strangely and when she reaches Emil's home to check if everything is all right she finds the door locked. When she tries to open the door using her key she notices a sticky substance inside the keyhole which has been deliberately put inside to stop her from entering.

She uses a crowbar to break open the door. In the bed room she sees finds the dead body of Ida. Emil's mother changes Ida's clothes so as to leave no clue, but some of the feathers of Emil's parrot get attached to the nightgown which will later prove damning for both Emil and his mother.

In the meanwhile Willy asks Tomme to accompany him to Copenhagen. Tomme refuses, but Willy tells him that he has mended his car for free and that he should help him in return. Tomme agrees and they leave. On the way back Willy asks Tomme to exchange his bag with his. Tomme knows that Willy is carrying drugs in it and refuses. Willy threatens him that he'll tell the secret to everyone, but Tomme still won't exchange bags.

This conversation takes place on the deck of the ship on which both of them are returning home, also there is a gale blowing and they can hardly stand erect, and both of them are drunk. Next day Tomme gets up and notices that Willy's not around. He searches for him, but he has disappeared. He returns home, and later Willy's mother calls Tomme's place to ask where Willy is. Ruth says Tomme has no idea as he was out with his friends. Willy's mother tells her that Willy has gone out with Tomme and nobody else. Ruth is puzzled, but Tomme confesses that it was only Willy that he'd been out with and tells her that Willy left him somewhere near the University and from there he returned home. He has no idea where Willy is now.

After hanging up the phone Tomme tells his mother how Willy asked him to swap bags and how he left him when he refused. Ruth is furious but thinks as Tomme has confessed his mistake he should be given a second chance. They later find out Willy had already put drugs in Tomme's bag and how he cheated Tomme. They get rid of the drugs.

As one clue leads to another it turns out that Ida was struck by Tomme's car and was knocked unconscious. She was found by Emil, who took her to his home in his three-wheeler. He tried to help her, but she died of internal injuries. Emil didn't know what to do next, so he just left her body on his bed.

Emil's mother thinks that Emil killed Ida. She wants to save him by getting rid of the body and at the same time leave no clue, so she changes Ida's clothes. These things eventually see all of them jailed.

Lastly, the reader is left wondering if Tomme killed Willy by throwing him off the deck on the night they were returning home on the ferry.
