= The Girl by the Lake =

2007 Italian thriller-drama film

- Directed by: Andrea Molaioli
- Written by: Sandro Petraglia
- Based on: Don't Look Back by Karin Fossum
- Produced by: Francesca Cima
- Starring: Toni Servillo; Valeria Golino; Fabrizio Gifuni; Omero Antonutti; Anna Bonaiuto
- Cinematography: Ramiro Civita
- Edited by: Giogiò Franchini
- Music by: Teho Teardo
- Distributed by: Medusa Film
- Release date: 2007
- Country: Italy
- Language: Italian

La ragazza del lago, internationally released as The Girl by the Lake, is a 2007 Italian thriller film directed by Andrea Molaioli, in his directorial debut. It is based on the novel Don't Look Back, written by Karin Fossum and published in 1996.

== Plot ==
A young girl called Marta accepts a lift from a disabled man, Mario, who takes her to play with some rabbits he owns. She spends several hours with him and his father, Antonutti. She is reported missing by her family, and Policeman Giovanni Sanzio is called in by local cop Lorenzo Siboldi to help look for her. In the meantime, Mario returns her home safely, but the pair report they found the body of a young girl by the lake. Sanzio and Siboldi begin investigating the murder — they find a young high school hockey player, Anna, dead and naked on the banks of Lake Fusine close to Tarvisio in Friuli-Venezia Giulia.

The investigation involves the whole village, as the community is small and isolated and therefore the criminal must have grown up there. The potential assassins are interrogated by the police officers.

Initially, Anna's boyfriend Roberto and her hockey coach are the primary suspects. Her hockey coach had previous convictions for sexual assault, and her boyfriend was in possession of the backpack Anna had been wearing the morning of her death. However, it becomes apparent that it is less obvious that it seems. Anna had until recently been outgoing and happy, but around 8 months prior she had become withdrawn. Around the same time, she had been diagnosed with an incurable brain tumour. Additionally, Angelo, the child Anna babysat, had died from choking around the same time, while being cared for by his father, Corrado.

Eventually, it transpires that Anna was murdered by Corrado, whom Anna had never been able to forgive for letting Angelo die.

== Awards ==
The film won ten David di Donatello awards for best film, best director, best new director, best screenplay (Sandro Petraglia), best producer (Nicola Giuliano and Francesco Cima), best actor (Toni Servillo), best cinematography (Ramiro Civita), best editing (Giorgio Franchini), best live sound engineer (Alessandro Zanon), and best special effects. It also won three Silver Ribbons .

== Cast ==
- Toni Servillo - Giovanni Sanzio
- Valeria Golino - Chiara Canali
- Fabrizio Gifuni - Corrado Canali
- Anna Bonaiuto - Sanzio's wife
- Omero Antonutti - Mario's father
- Marco Baliani - Davide Nadal
- Giulia Michelini - Francesca
- Nello Mascia - Alfredo
