= Tove Ditlevsen =

Danish poet and author (1917–1976)

- Born: 14 December 1917; Copenhagen, Denmark
- Died: 7 March 1976 (aged 58); Vesterbro, Denmark
- Resting place: Vestre Cemetery (Copenhagen)
- Occupations: Poet, memoirist
- Writing career
- Genres: Poetry, Short Stories, Novels, Memoirs, Essays

Tove Irma Margit Ditlevsen (Danish: [ˈtsʰoːvə ˈtitle̝wsn̩]; 14 December 1917 – 7 March 1976) was a Danish poet and author. With published works in a variety of genres, she was one of Denmark's best-known authors by the time of her death.

== Early life and career ==
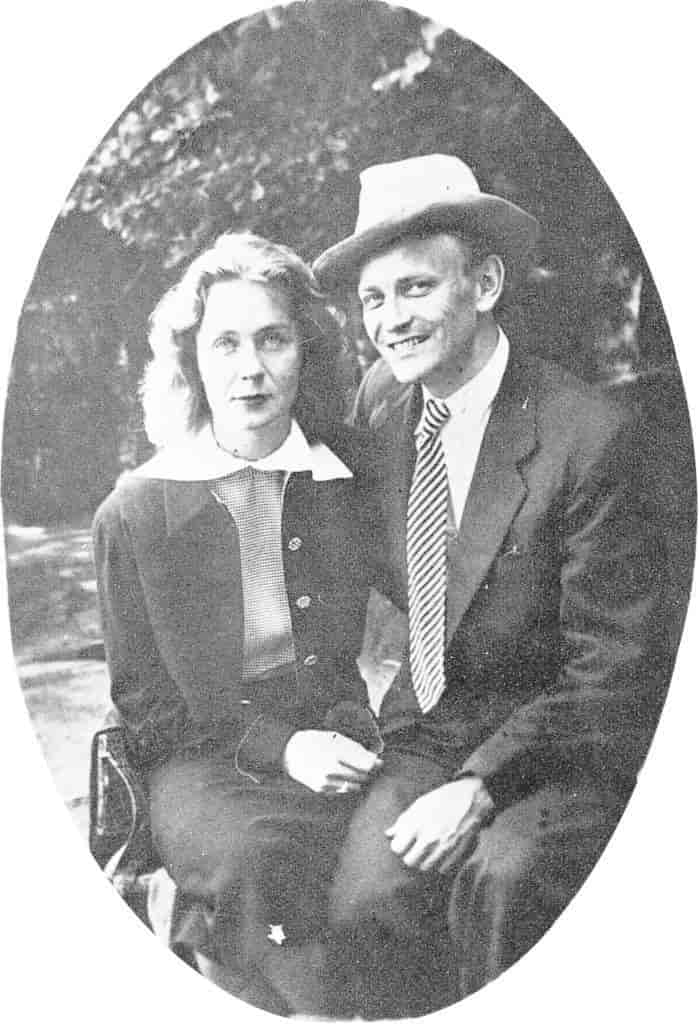
Ditlevsen and Victor Andreasen as newlyweds, 1951

Tove Ditlevsen was born in Copenhagen and grew up in the working-class neighbourhood of Vesterbro. Her childhood experiences were the focal points of her work. Ditlevsen was married (and divorced) four times.

In her life, Ditlevsen published 29 books including short stories, novels, poetry, and memoirs. Female identity, memory, and loss of childhood are recurring themes in her work. She began writing poems at the age of ten. Her first volume of poetry was published in her early twenties. In 1947, she experienced popular success with the publication of her poetry collection Blinkende Lygter (Flickering Lights). The Danish Broadcasting Corporation commissioned her to write a novel, Vi har kun hinanden (We only have each other), which was published in 1954 and broadcast as radio installments. Ditlevsen also authored a column in the weekly Familie Journal, responding to letters from readers.

== The Copenhagen Trilogy ==
Three of her books, Barndom (Childhood), Ungdom (Youth), and Gift (meaning both poison and married), form an autobiographical trilogy. The first two books were translated by Tiina Nunnally and published in 1985 by Seal Press under the title Early Spring. The complete trilogy, with the third book translated by Michael Favala Goldman, was published in one volume in 2019 (with the titles Childhood, Youth and Dependency) and referred to as The Copenhagen Trilogy.

In 2024, The New York Times Book Review named the English translation and collection of the trilogy one of the 100 best books of the 21st century. The list was compiled using a survey of various literary figures chosen by the newspaper and all books were valid as long as they were first published in the United States after January 1, 2000, including translations such as the one by Nunnally and Favala Goldman.

Throughout her adult life, Ditlevsen struggled with alcohol and drug abuse, and she was admitted to a psychiatric hospital several times, a recurring theme in her later novels. The third volume of her autobiography, Dependency, primarily deals with her addiction. British writer Matt Rowland Hill identified Dependency as one of the five best addiction memoirs, on par with Confessions of an English Opium Eater and poet Mary Karr's memoir of alcoholism. In the book, Ditlevsen describes how her dependency on narcotics led her to feign an ear ailment and underwent surgery that made her permanently deaf in one ear.

She died by suicide in 1976 from an overdose of sleeping pills.

== Recognition and legacy ==
Ditlevsen was awarded the Tagea Brandt Rejselegat in 1953 and De Gyldne Laurbær in 1956. In 2014, she was included in the literary canon for Danish primary schools.

Her poem "Blinkende Lygter", from the poetry collection of the same name, is referred to and namesake for the 2000 Danish film Flickering Lights, directed by Anders Thomas Jensen and often named the most popular feature film in its native Denmark in various polls. Her novel Barndommens gade was made into a film in mid-1980s and Anne Linnet released an album with poems by Ditlevsen, sung by Linnet. The music from the album was also used in the movie Barndommens gade.

== Bibliography ==
- Pigesind, poems 1939.
- Slangen i Paradiset, poems 1939.
- Man gjorde et barn fortræd, novel 1941.
- De evige tre, poems 1942.
- Lille Verden, poems 1942.
- Barndommens gade, novel, 1943.
- Den fulde Frihed, short stories 1944.
- Det første møde, short story, 1944.
- For Barnets Skyld, novel, 1946.
- Blinkende Lygter, poems, 1947.
- Dommeren, short stories, 1948.
- "Tårer", short story, 1948.
- En flink dreng, short stories, 1952.
- Paraplyen, short stories, 1952.
- "Nattens dronning", short story, 1952.
- Vi har kun hinanden, 1954.
- Jalousi, poems, 1955.
- Der bor en pige, poem, 1955.
- Kvindesind, poems, 1955.
- Annelise - 13 år, children's book, 1958.
- Flugten fra opvasken, memoirs, 1959.
- Hvad nu Annelise?, children's book, 1960.
- To som elsker hinanden, novel, 1960.
- Den hemmelige rude, poems, 1961.
- Den onde lykke, short stories, 1963.
- Dolken, short stories, 1963.
- Barndom (Childhood), memoirs, 1967.
- Ungdom (Youth), memoirs, 1967.
- Ansigterne (The Faces), novel, 1968.
- De voksne, poems, 1969.
- Det tidlige forår, memoirs, 1969.
- Gift (Dependency), memoirs, 1971.
- Det runde værelse, poems, 1973.
- Parenteser, essays, 1973.
- Min nekrolog og andre skumle tanker, essays, 1973.
- Min første kærlighed, memoirs, 1973.
- Vilhelms værelse (Vilhelm's Room), novel, 1975.
- Tove Ditlevsen om sig selv, memoirs, 1975.
- Til en lille pige, poems, 1978.
- Kærlig hilsen, Tove - Breve til en forlægger, letters (1969-1975), 2019.

== Awards, prizes and grants ==
- 1942 - Carl Møllers Legat
- 1942 - Emma Bærentzens Legat
- 1942 - Astrid Goldschmidts Legat
- 1945 - Forfatterforbundets Legat
- 1945 - Holger Drachmann-legatet
- 1950 - Edith Rode Legatet
- 1952 - Direktør J.P. Lund og hustru Vilhelmine Bugge's Legat
- 1953 - Otto Benzons Forfatterlegat
- 1953 - Tagea Brandt Rejselegat
- 1954 - Emil Aarestrup Medaillen
- 1955 - Tipsmidler
- 1956 - De Gyldne Laurbær
- 1958 - Jeanne og Henri Nathansens Mindelegat
- 1958 - Morten Nielsens Mindelegat
- 1959 - Forlaget Fremads folkebiblioteks legat
- 1959 - Ministry of Culture's children book prize (Denmark) (Kulturministeriets Børnebogspris) for her Children's book Annelise - tretten år
- 1966 - Rektor frk. Ingrid Jespersens Legat
- 1971 - Biblioteksafgiftens top 25: 10 (She was number 10 on the top-25 list over library books
- 1971 - Søren Gyldendal Prize
- 1975 - Dansk Forfatterforenings H.C. Andersen Legat
- 1975 - Jeanne og Henri Nathansens Mindelegat
- 1999 – 23 years after her death, the readers of Politiken could choose a book as "Danish book of the Century". Ditlevsen's book Barndommens gade was number 21.
