= Karin Fossum =

Norwegian writer (born 1954)

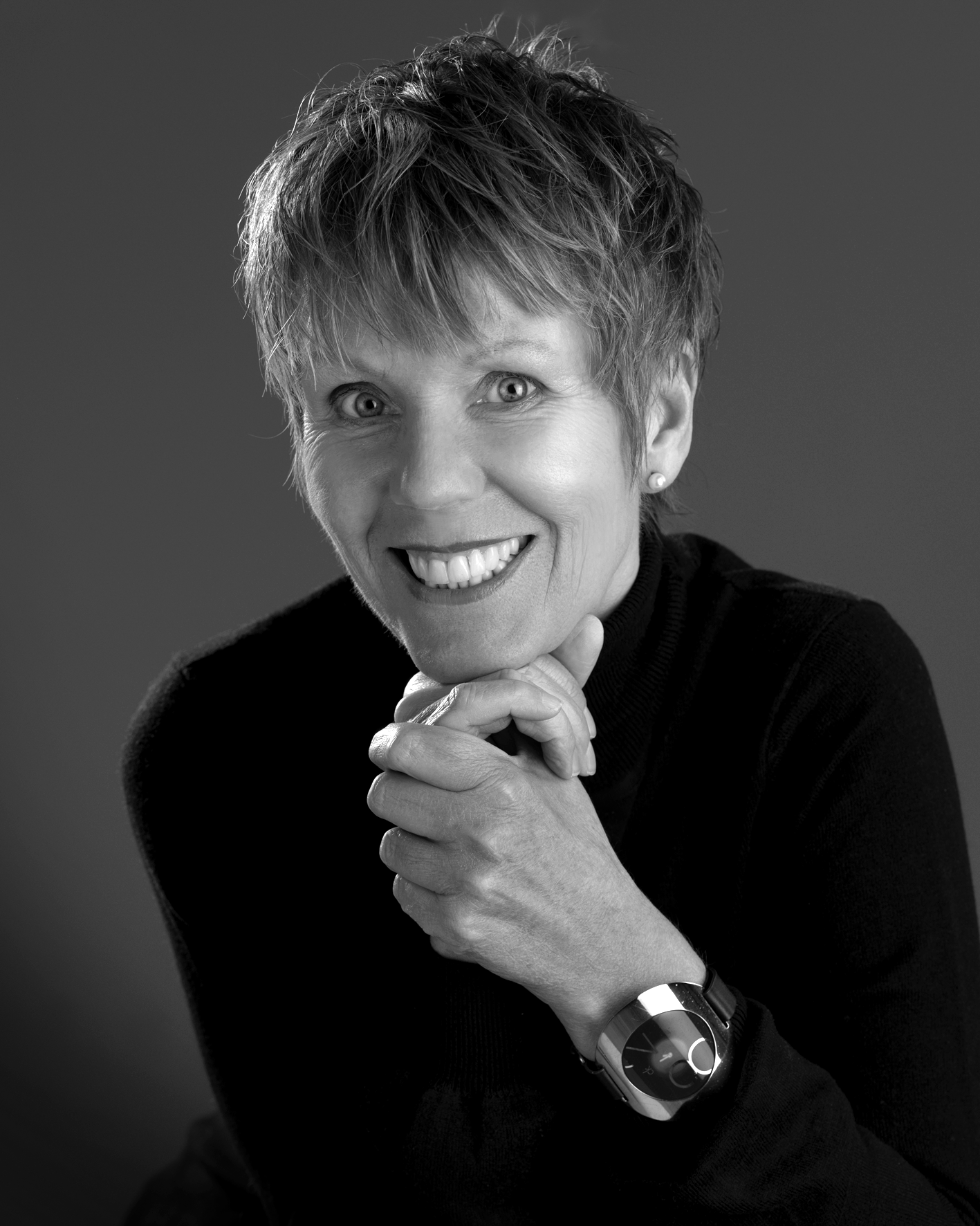
- Karin Fossum in 2008
- Born: 6 November 1954 (age 71); Sandefjord, Vestfold, Norway
- Occupation: Novelist
- Writing career
- Period: 1974–present
- Genre: Crime fiction
- Notable awards: Tarjei Vesaas' debutantpris; Rivertonprisen; Glass Key award; Bokhandlerprisen; Brage Prize; Martin Beck Award; Cappelen Prize; The Gumshoe Awards; Los Angeles Times Book Prize

Karin Fossum (born 6 November 1954) is a Norwegian author of crime fiction, often referred to as the "Norwegian queen of crime".

== Early life ==
Karin Mathisen was born on 6 November 1954 in Sandefjord, in Vestfold county, Norway. She currently lives in Sylling, near Oslo. Fossum debuted as a poet with Kanskje i morgen, her first collection published in 1974 when she was just 20. It won Tarjei Vesaas' debutantpris. For a time she worked in hospitals, and nursing homes and assisted with the rehabilitation of drug addicts.

== Writing career ==
Fossum began her literary career as a poet. She is the author of the internationally successful Inspector Konrad Sejer series of crime novels, which have been translated into 25 languages and honoured with several awards.

She won the Glass Key award for her novel Don't Look Back, which also won the Riverton Prize, and she was shortlisted for the Crime Writers' Association Gold Dagger in 2005 for Calling Out For You.

La ragazza del lago, internationally released as The Girl by the Lake, is a 2007 Italian thriller-drama film directed by Andrea Molaioli, in his directorial debut. It is based on the 1996 novel Don't Look Back (Se deg ikke tilbake!).

== Bibliography ==
=== Inspector Sejer Series ===
(also featuring Inspector Jakob Skarre):

1. 1995 - Eva's Eye / In the Darkness (Evas øye); English translation 2012
2. 1996 - Don't Look Back (Se deg ikke tilbake!); English translation 2002
3. 1997 - He Who Fears the Wolf (Den som frykter ulven); English translation 2003
4. 1998 - When the Devil Holds the Candle (Djevelen holder lyset); English translation 2004
5. 2000 - Calling Out For You (Elskede Poona); English translation: 2005; American translation: The Indian Bride, 2007
6. 2002 - Black Seconds (Svarte sekunder); English translation 2007
7. 2004 - The Murder of Harriet Krohn (Drapet på Harriet Krohn); English translation 2014
8. 2007 - The Water's Edge (Den som elsker noe annet); English translation 2009
9. 2008 - Bad Intentions (Den onde viljen); English translation 2010
10. 2009 - The Caller (Varsleren); English translation 2011
11. 2013 - The Drowned Boy (Carmen Zita og døden); English translation 2015
12. 2014 - Hell Fire (Helvetesilden); English translation 2016
13. 2016 - The Whisperer (Hviskeren); English translation

The character of Sejer appeared in a series of Norwegian TV adaptations starring Bjørn Sundquist in the role, with Christian Skolmen as Sejer's partner Jacob Skarre.

=== Other writings ===
- 1974 - Kanskje i morgen – poetry
- 1978 - Med ansiktet i skyggen – poetry
- 1992 - I et annet lys - short stories
- 1994 - Søylen - short stories
- 1999 - De gales hus - novel
- 2002 - Jonas Eckel - novel
- 2003 - The Night of November 4th (Natt til fjerde november);
- 2006 - Broken (Brudd); English translation 2008
- 2011 - Jeg kan se i mørket (English translation 2013 I Can See in the Dark)
- 2012 - Natten er et annet land - poetry (The Night is Another Land)

== Awards ==
- Tarjei Vesaas' debutantpris 1974, for Kanskje i morgen
- Rivertonprisen 1996, for Se deg ikke tilbake
- Glass Key award 1997, for Se deg ikke tilbake
- Bokhandlerprisen 1997, for Den som frykter ulven
- Brage Prize 2000, for Elskede Poona
- Martin Beck Award 2002, for Svarte sekunder
- Cappelen Prize 2003
- The Gumshoe Awards for best European crime novel 2007, for Når djevelen holder lyset (translated as: When the Devil Holds the Candle")
- Los Angeles Times Book Prize in the category Mystery/Thriller for 2007 published in 2008, for Elskede Poona (translated as: "The Indian Bride")
- Amalie Skram Prize 2013.

Awards
Preceded by Anders Heger	Recipient of the Brage Prize, open class 2000	Succeeded by Annie Riis
Preceded by Jan Jakob Tønseth	Recipient of the Cappelen Prize; 2003	Succeeded by P. Carmona-Alvarez, Ingeborg Arvola, Ørnulf Hodne, Anne-Lise Gjerdrum
