= Philippe Claudel =

French writer and film director (born 1962)

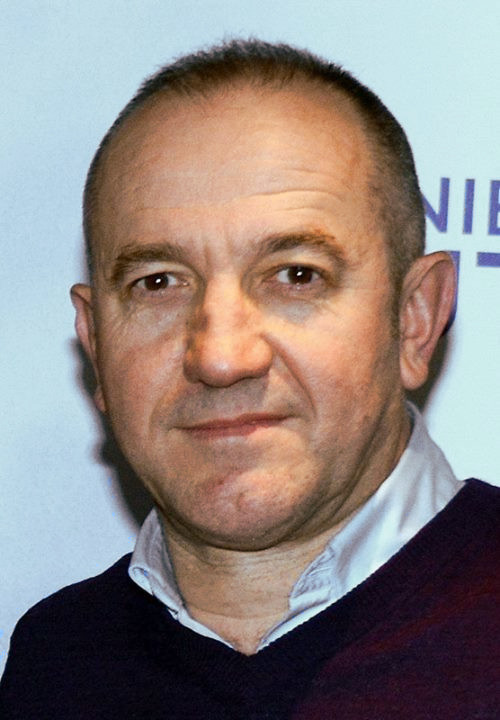
- Philippe Claudel in 2013
- Born: 2 February 1962 (age 64); Dombasle-sur-Meurthe, Meurthe-et-Moselle, France
- Occupations: Novelist, Film director, Writer
- Years active: 1999–present

Philippe Claudel (born 2 February 1962) is a French writer and film director.

Claudel was born in Dombasle-sur-Meurthe, Meurthe-et-Moselle. In addition to his writing, Claudel is a professor of literature at the University of Nancy.

He directed the 2008 film I've Loved You So Long (Il y a longtemps que je t'aime). Much admired, it won the 2009 BAFTA for the best film not in English.

== Life ==
After studying in Nancy, he remained there and for eleven years worked as a teacher in prisons. Contact with his students inspired short stories, novels, and then screenplays. He has said that the experience made him give up his simple opinions about people, about guilt, about the water to judge others. "It's clear to me now that it would have been impossible for me to write a novel like Brodeck's Report or Grey Souls, to make a movie like I've Loved You So Long, if I hadn't been in jail."

== Awards ==
His best-known work to date is the novel Les Âmes grises (Grey Souls), which won the Prix Renaudot in France, was shortlisted for the American Gumshoe Award, and won Sweden's Martin Beck Award. He won the 2003 Prix Goncourt de la Nouvelle for Les petites mécaniques, and the 2010 Independent Foreign Fiction Prize, for Brodeck’s Report, ' his hallucinatory story – almost a dark fairy-tale in which Kafka meets the Grimms – of an uneasy homecoming after wrenching tragedy."

His debut film I've Loved You So Long won the BAFTA Award for Best Film Not in the English Language. Claudel also won the César Award for Best First Feature Film for the film.

== Works ==
=== Novels ===
- Quelques-uns des cent regrets: roman, Balland, 1999
- Le Bruit des trousseaux (2002)
- Grey souls (Les Âmes grises) (2003); Librairie générale française, 2006, ISBN 978-2-253-10908-2. Grand prix des lectrices de Elle, Translator Adriana Hunter, Weidenfeld & Nicolson/Phoenix House, 2005, ISBN 978-0-297-84779-3. By a Slow River. Translated by Hoyt Rogers. Knopf. 2006. ISBN 9781400078011.; Random House Digital, 2007, ISBN 978-1-4000-7801-1
- Monsieur Linh and His Child (La Petite Fille de Monsieur Linh), Translator Euan Cameron, Stock, 2005, ISBN 978-2-234-05774-6; Quercus, 2011, ISBN 978-1-906694-99-9
- Brodeck's Report (Le Rapport de Brodeck), Translator John Cullen, 2007.
- The Investigator (L'Enquête), Paris, Stock, 2010, 278 p., ISBN 978-2234065154; Doubleday, 2012, Translator John Cullen, ISBN 978-0-385-53534-2
- Parfums, 2012, Paris, Stock, 224 p. (ISBN 2234073251)
- L’Arbre du pays Toraja, 2016 (ISBN 978-2-2340-8150-5) (The Tree of the Toraja), Translator Euan Cameron, MacLehose Press Editions 2018 (ISBN 0-85705-770-7)
- Inhumaines, 2017, Stock, (ISBN 978-2253073956)
- L'Archipel du Chien, 2018, Stock (ISBN 978-2-234-08595-4)

=== Films ===
- I've Loved You So Long, 2008, with Kristin Scott Thomas and Elsa Zylberstein
- Tous les soleils, 2011, with Stefano Accorsi, Neri Marcorè, Lisa Cipriani, Clotilde Courau, Anouk Aimée
- Before the Winter Chill, 2013, with Kristin Scott Thomas, Daniel Auteuil and Leïla Bekhti
- A Childhood (2015)

== Adaptations ==
- Les Âmes grises, 2005, directed by Yves Angelo, with Jean-Pierre Marielle, Jacques Villeret. Distributed by Warner Bros.
