= Secrets in the Fire =

1995 novel by Henning Mankell

- First edition
- Author: Henning Mankell
- Original title: Eldens hemlighet
- Translator: Anne Connie Stuksrud
- Language: Swedish
- Genre: Children's novel
- Publisher: Rabén & Sjögren; Allen & Unwin (Eng. trans.)
- Publication date: 1995 (orig Swedish edition)
- Publication place: Sweden
- English publication date: 1 May 2000 (Eng. trans.)
- Media type: Print (Hardback & Paperback)
- Pages: 168 pp (Eng. trans. edition, hardback)
- ISBN: 1-86508-181-7 (Eng. trans. edition, hardback)
- OCLC: 43971373
- Followed by: Playing with Fire (Eldens gåta)

Secrets in the Fire is a children's novel by Swedish author Henning Mankell. It was published in 1995 and was translated into English by Anne Connie Stuksrud. Secrets in the Fire was based on the true story of land mine victim Sofia Alface. The book has won the 2002 Sankei Children's Publishing Culture Award.

== Plot summary ==
When Sofia's hometown is destroyed by The Bandits, Muazena, the village's wise woman, must find a way to teach Sofia the secrets in the fire. Even with Muazena trying to help, Sofia must overcome multiple adversities such as losing both her sister and her legs to a land mine and all the strife that comes with growing up. Throughout her recovery Sofia finds that she is not as weak as some would have her believe and that she has a strength of her own.

== Sequels ==
There are two sequels to Secrets in the Fire, Playing With Fire and Shadow of the Leopard. Both books received positive reviews from critics.

== Reception ==
Critical reception for Secrets in the Fire was overwhelmingly positive, with the School Library Journal writing that the book was "outstanding" and "inspirational". Booklist stated that the book will "grab readers with the truth of one child's terror and courage".
