= The Caller (novel) =

2009 novel by Karin Fossum

- First edition (Norwegian)
- Author: Karin Fossum
- Original title: Varsleren
- Translator: K. E. Semmel
- Cover artist: Head Design Limited
- Language: Norwegian
- Series: Inspector Konrad Sejer, #8
- Genre: Crime, Mystery novel
- Publisher: Cappelen (Norway)
- Publication date: 2009
- Publication place: Norway
- English publication date: August 1, 2011
- Media type: Print (Hardcover, Paperback)
- Pages: 304
- ISBN: 978-0-099-54877-5
- Preceded by: Bad Intentions

The Caller (Norwegian: Varsleren, 2009) is a crime fiction novel by Norwegian crime fiction author Karin Fossum, the tenth in the Inspector Konrad Sejer series, released 2009 by Random House, and published in English in 2011.

== Reception ==
Kenneth Turan of the Los Angeles Times said that The Caller provided the chills, and that it "will put you away, no questions asked". Goodreads gave The Caller 3.77 stars, based on user-generated ratings. The Irish Times praised the novel, saying that it was "A contemporary Patricia Highsmith, her (Fossum's) offbeat obsession with the psychology of the criminal mind, and the human cost of the criminal activity, pays off handsomely yet again."
