= Mary Willis Walker =

American crime fiction author (1942–2023)

- Born: Mary Willis; May 24, 1942; Fox Point, Wisconsin, U.S.
- Died: November 4, 2023 (aged 81)
- Education: Duke University
- Occupation: Author
- Spouse: Lee Walker (1967–1993)
- Writing career
- Genre: Crime fiction
- Notable works: Zero at the Bone, The Red Scream, Under the Beetle's Cellar
- Notable awards: Agatha Award (1991); Macavity Award (1992, 1996); Edgar Award (1995); Anthony Award (1996); Martin Beck Award (1998)

Mary Willis Walker (May 24, 1942 – November 4, 2023) was an American crime fiction author.

== Life ==
Walker graduated from Duke University in English and took up high school teaching. She married in 1967 to Lee Walker who became president of Dell Computers, living in New York and Virginia before moving to Austin, Texas. They had two daughters, Amanda and Susannah. The couple divorced when she was 51. She returned to her maiden name of Mary Willis, but continued to published as Mary Willis Walker, which, she wrote in an article for the New York Times Magazine, she considered a pen name. She continued to live in Austin.

Walker died November 4, 2023.

== Writing ==
She began writing in her mid-forties, which she characterized as "pretty late to start". She spent two years writing her first published thriller, Zero at the Bone, which was published in 1991. Her second Texas-based mystery, Red Scream, was Walker's first to feature sleuth Molly Cates. Red Scream won the Best Mystery Edgar Award in 1993. Under the Beetle's Cellar, published in 1995, was Walker's third mystery.

== Published works ==
- Zero at the Bone (1991)
- "Molly Cates" series
  - The Red Scream (1994)
  - Under the Beetle's Cellar (1995)
  - All the Dead Lie Down (1998)

== Selected awards ==
- 1991: Agatha Award for best first novel for Zero at the Bone
- 1992: Macavity Award for best first novel for Zero at the Bone
- 1995: Edgar Award for Best Novel for The Red Scream
- 1996: Macavity Award for Under the Beetle's Cellar
- 1996: Anthony Award for Under the Beetle's Cellar
- 1998: Martin Beck Award for Under the Beetle's Cellar
