= He Who Fears the Wolf =

1997 novel by Karin Fossum

- First edition (Norwegian)
- Author: Karin Fossum
- Original title: Den som frykter ulven
- Translator: Felicity David
- Language: Norwegian
- Series: Inspector Konrad Sejer, #3
- Genre: Crime novel
- Publisher: Cappelen (Norway)
- Publication date: 1997
- Publication place: Norway
- English publication date: July 2003
- Media type: Print (Hardcover, Paperback)
- ISBN: 1-84343-044-4
- OCLC: 52056813
- Dewey Decimal: 839.8/238 22
- LC Class: PT8951.16.O735 D4613 2003
- Preceded by: Don't Look Back
- Followed by: When the Devil Holds the Candle

He Who Fears the Wolf (Norwegian: Den som frykter ulven, 1997) is a novel by Norwegian writer Karin Fossum, the third in the Inspector Konrad Sejer series.
