= Daniel (Mankell novel) =

2000 novel by Henning Mankell

- First edition
- Author: Henning Mankell
- Original title: Vindens son
- Translator: Steven T. Murray
- Language: Swedish
- Genre: Fiction
- Publisher: Norstedts förlag (Swedish); Harvill Secker (English)
- Publication date: 2000 (orig.) 2010 (trans.)
- Publication place: Sweden
- Media type: Print (Hardcover, Paperback)
- ISBN: 1-59558-193-6

Daniel is a novel by Swedish writer Henning Mankell first published in Swedish in 2000 under the title Vindens son (Son of the wind). The English translation by Steven T. Murray was published in September 2010.

== Plot ==
The story is set in 1874. Hans Bengler is an entomologist from Skåne, Sweden who is studying at Lund University and decides to go on an expedition on his own to the Kalahari Desert in Southern Africa to find insects new to science and thereby to make a name for himself. After a long and arduous journey by sea to Cape Town and then in the desert he arrives at a trading post run by an expatriate Swede, which Bengler decided to make the base for his explorations.

Whilst at the trading post he comes across a small boy, called Molo, who was the sole survivor in his extended family, the rest of whom had been brutally killed by men on horseback with spears and rifles, some who were white and some who were black. He is taken to the trading post where he is put in a cage to be bartered in exchange for provisions. Bengler decides to rescue the boy adopting him as his son. Not knowing his name, Bengler decides to call him Daniel. Bengler sets himself the challenge, as he sees it, of civilising the young savage boy. The two of them journey back to Sweden. Daniel initially seeks to escape but over time grows to accept Bengler as his new father. Daniel begins to learn to speak Swedish and adopt some basic European customs, though still recalling the aspects of his African culture and beliefs he had been taught. On board the ship and on arrival in Stockholm Daniel is treated with curiosity and disdain and experiences some racial abuse. Bengler decides to gain notoriety and earn a living by displaying and giving lectures on his exhibits, stored in glass jars. However, noticing the great interest the public had displayed in Daniel, Bengler decides to include him as a surprise exhibit in his lectures.

After a serious incident, father and son are forced to flee, hiding their tracks to avoid being pursued. Bengler hands Daniel over to an elderly farmer and his wife in Småland, to look after as he decides to disappear, promising to return in time. Daniel finds he is not welcomed into the deeply religious close-knit rural community. He becomes more and more homesick and has increasingly disturbing dreams about his mother and other family members. He befriends a young girl called Sanna, whose unusual behaviour has resulted in her being ostracised by local people and abused by her adopted father. After making one unsuccessfully attempt to make his way home, subsequently, Daniel and Sanna set off together to find a ship to take them both to Africa. Their adventure ends with the two friends arguing and returning home with events spiralling out of control with a sequence of disastrous consequences.
