= Don't Look Back (novel) =

1996 novel by Karin Fossum

- First edition (Norwegian)
- Author: Karin Fossum
- Original title: Se deg ikke tilbake!
- Translator: Felicity David
- Language: Norwegian
- Series: Inspector Konrad Sejer, #2
- Genre: Crime novel
- Publisher: Cappelen (Norway)
- Publication date: 1996
- Publication place: Norway
- English publication date: October 2002
- Media type: Print (Hardcover, Paperback)
- ISBN: 1-86046-977-9
- OCLC: 50215251
- Dewey Decimal: 839.82/38 22
- LC Class: PT8951.16.O735 S413 2002
- Preceded by: In the Darkness
- Followed by: He Who Fears the Wolf

Don't Look Back (Norwegian: Se deg ikke tilbake!, 1996) is a novel by Norwegian writer Karin Fossum, the second to feature Inspector Konrad Sejer. The novel is the first book of Fossum which was translated into English. It won the Glass Key Award in 1997. It was filmed in 2007 as La ragazza del lago (aka The Girl by the Lake).

== Plot ==
The body of a local teenage girl named Annie was found by an idyllic pond in the woods. The suspect list grows indefinitely. However, as Inspector Sejer and his partner Jacob Skarre question the girl's family, and others, they realize she has a shocking secret she shared with no one. He strives to understand Annie's true character, as the answer may lie in her own strange behavior leading up to her death.
