= When the Devil Holds the Candle =

1998 novel by Karin Fossum

- First edition (Norwegian)
- Author: Karin Fossum
- Original title: Djevelen holder lyset
- Translator: Felicity David
- Language: Norwegian
- Series: Inspector Konrad Sejer, #4
- Genre: Crime, Mystery novel
- Publisher: Cappelen (Norway)
- Publication date: 1998
- Publication place: Norway
- English publication date: July 2004
- Media type: Print (Hardcover, Paperback)
- ISBN: 1-84343-091-6
- OCLC: 56394166
- Preceded by: He Who Fears the Wolf
- Followed by: Calling Out for You

When the Devil Holds the Candle (Norwegian: Djevelen holder lyset, 1998) is a novel by Norwegian writer Karin Fossum, fourth in the Inspector Konrad Sejer series. In 2007, upon its publication in the US, the novel won the Gumshoe Award for Best European Crime Novel.

== Plot ==
The story follows teenage friends Andreas and Zipp, the former a fun loving delinquent, while the latter a reluctant follower. After robbing a young mother of her purse, Andreas suggests breaking into the house of an elderly woman to rob her, not feeling good about the previous robbery, Zipp refuses to go through with it, so Andreas enters the house alone. Unfortunately, Andreas underestimates Irma Funder, the elderly woman he intended to rob, who pushes him back in self-defence. resulting in him falling down the cellar stairs, breaking his neck and unable to move but still alive. The story continues both inside the house as Andreas must now rely on Irma for his every need, and outside, as Police investigate the disappearance of Andreas, while Zipp is unwilling to speak to Detective Inspector Sejer, due to his involvement in the previous event.
