= Les Âmes grises =

Grey Souls
- Title page for Les Âmes grises (2003)
- Author: Philippe Claudel
- Original title: Les Âmes grises
- Translator: Adriana Hunter
- Language: French
- Publication date: 2003
- Publication place: France

Les Âmes grises is a novel by the French author Philippe Claudel. It is a first person narrative which revolves around the murder of a young girl in a small provincial French town near the Western Front in 1917. The book was published in France in 2003 and won the Prix Renaudot. It was also shortlisted for the Prix Goncourt and the Prix Femina.

Les Âmes grises has been translated into 28 languages. The British edition, translated by Adriana Hunter, has been released under the title Grey Souls, while the American translation by Hoyt Rogers is called By a Slow River.

The book was also turned into a movie of the same name by director Yves Angelo.
