= Andrea Molaioli =

Italian film director and screenwriter

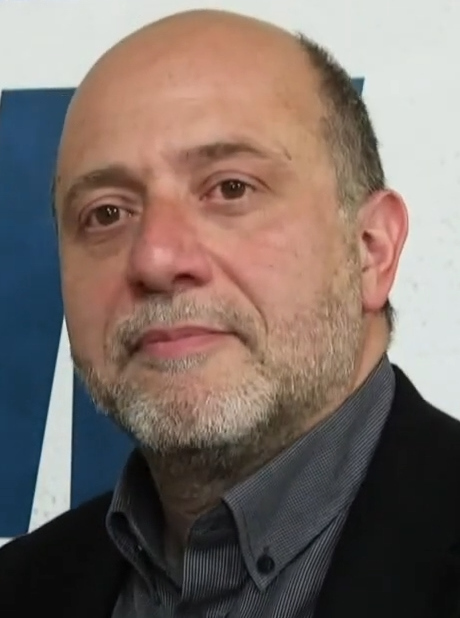
- Molaioli in 2017
- Born: Italy
- Occupation(s): Film director Screenwriter

Andrea Molaioli is an Italian film director and screenwriter. His film credits include The Girl by the Lake and The Jewel.

== Filmography ==
=== Films ===
- The Girl by the Lake (2007)
- The Jewel (2011)
