= Lier, Norway =

Lier Municipality Lier kommune
- Municipality
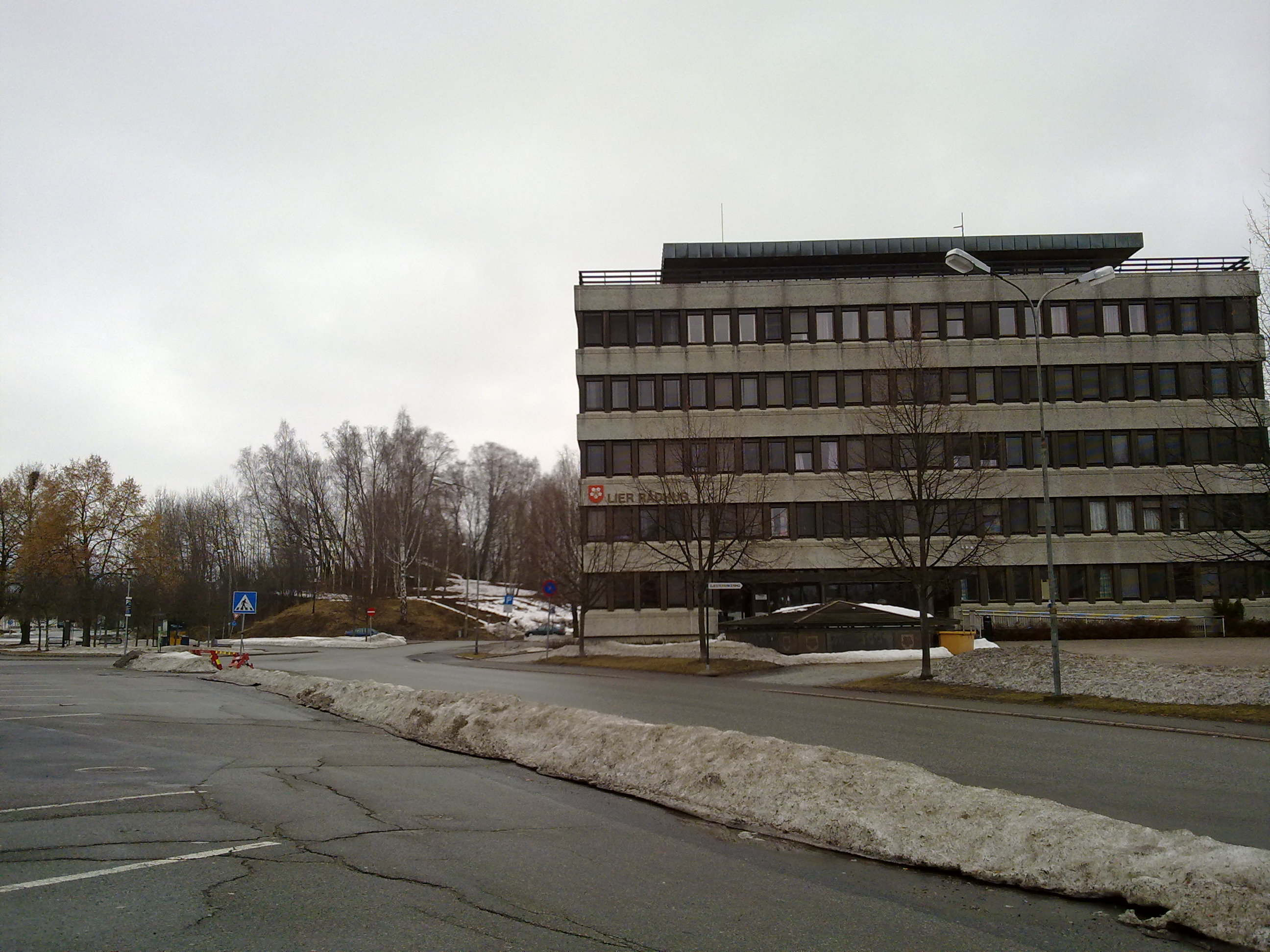
- City Hall in Lierbyen

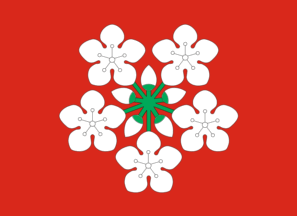
- Flag Coat of arms

- Buskerud within Norway

- Lier within Buskerud
- Coordinates: 59.7937863°N 10.2660000°E
- Country: Norway
- County: Buskerud
- Administrative centre: Lierbyen

Government
  - Mayor (2022): Kjetil Kivle (H)

Area
  - Total: 301 km^{2} (116 sq mi)
  - Land: 281 km^{2} (108 sq mi)
  - Rank: #277 in Norway

Population (24971)
  - Total: 21,594
  - Rank: #40 in Norway
  - Density: 77/km^{2} (200/sq mi)
  - Change (10 years): ▲ +9.8%
- Demonym: Liung

Official language
  - Norwegian form: Bokmål
- Time zone: UTC+01:00 (CET)
  - Summer (DST): UTC+02:00 (CEST)
- ISO 3166 code: NO-3312
- Website: Official website

Lier is a municipality in Buskerud county, Norway. The administrative centre of the municipality is the village of Lierbyen. The municipality of Lier was established on 1 January 1838 (see formannskapsdistrikt). The area Åssiden was transferred from Lier to the neighboring municipality of Drammen on 1 July 1951.

Norway's longest indoor shopping center, Liertoppen, is located in Lierskogen. The newspaper Lierposten is published in Lier.

== General information ==
=== Name ===
The Old Norse form of the name was Líðir. The name is the plural form of líð which means "hillside".

=== Coat of arms ===
The coat of arms and was designed by Hallvard Trætteberg and granted on 14 August 1970. The arms show five silver-colored apple blossoms on a red background. The area is well known for the production of various types of fruit, berries, vegetables, and flowers, so this was chosen as a symbol of the area's lush scenery and agriculture.

Number of minorities (1st and 2nd generation) in Lier by country of origin in 2017
Ancestry	Number
Poland	1,199
Lithuania	343
Somalia	310
India	301
Pakistan	245
Iraq	197
Vietnam	186
Germany	166
Sweden	162
Kosovo	153

== Geography ==
Lier borders to the municipalities of Asker, Bærum, Drammen, Modum and Hole. It includes the villages of Lierbyen, Sylling, Sjåstad, Nøste, Gullaug, Lierskogen, and Tranby.

Lier is thought of as a "green lung" for Norway's capital, Oslo, with its vast number of fields and apple trees. It is also famous for its agricultural products, such as strawberries and vegetables.

The Gilhusodden Nature Preserve is home of many different bird species. The area is also used for recreation, especially swimming and sunbathing, with its long, shallow beach.

=== Climate ===
Climate data for Lier 1991–2020 (39 m, avg high/low 2013-2025)
Month	Jan	Feb	Mar	Apr	May	Jun	Jul	Aug	Sep	Oct	Nov	Dec	Year
Mean daily maximum °C (°F)	−0.2 (31.6)	1.9 (35.4)	6.6 (43.9)	12.4 (54.3)	17.7 (63.9)	22 (72)	23.5 (74.3)	21.6 (70.9)	17.7 (63.9)	11 (52)	5.7 (42.3)	1.6 (34.9)	11.8 (53.3)
Daily mean °C (°F)	−2.9 (26.8)	−2.4 (27.7)	0.8 (33.4)	5.6 (42.1)	10.8 (51.4)	14.7 (58.5)	17.1 (62.8)	15.7 (60.3)	11.6 (52.9)	5.9 (42.6)	1.7 (35.1)	−2.2 (28.0)	6.4 (43.5)
Mean daily minimum °C (°F)	−6.2 (20.8)	−4.9 (23.2)	−2.6 (27.3)	0.7 (33.3)	5.8 (42.4)	10 (50)	11.9 (53.4)	10.5 (50.9)	8.2 (46.8)	3.5 (38.3)	−0.2 (31.6)	−4 (25)	2.7 (36.9)
Average precipitation mm (inches)	65 (2.6)	49 (1.9)	55 (2.2)	45 (1.8)	62 (2.4)	65 (2.6)	78 (3.1)	88 (3.5)	100 (3.9)	105 (4.1)	85 (3.3)	63 (2.5)	860 (33.9)
Source 1: yr.no
Source 2: Seklima (avg highs/lows)

== Notable residents ==
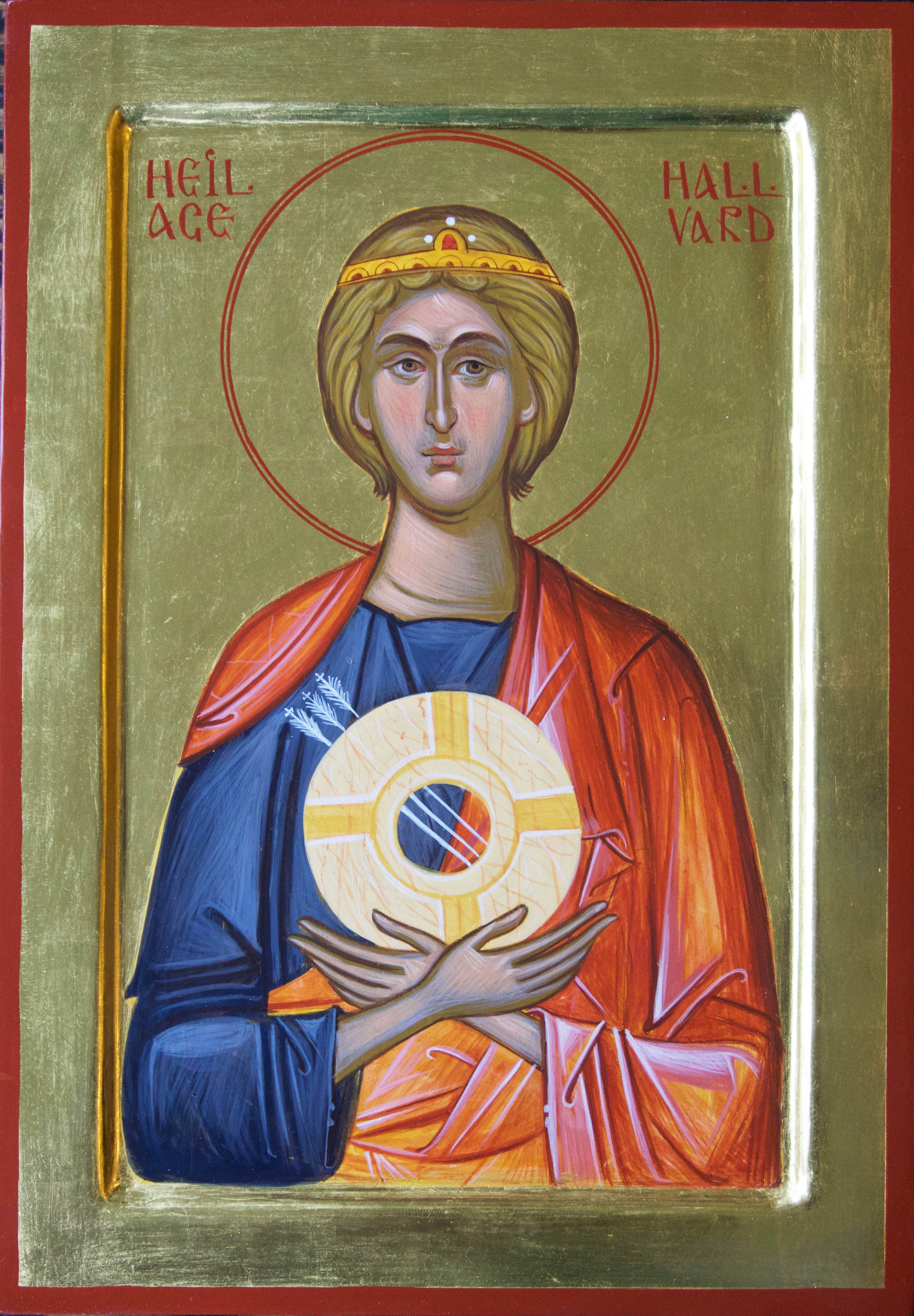
St. Hallvard

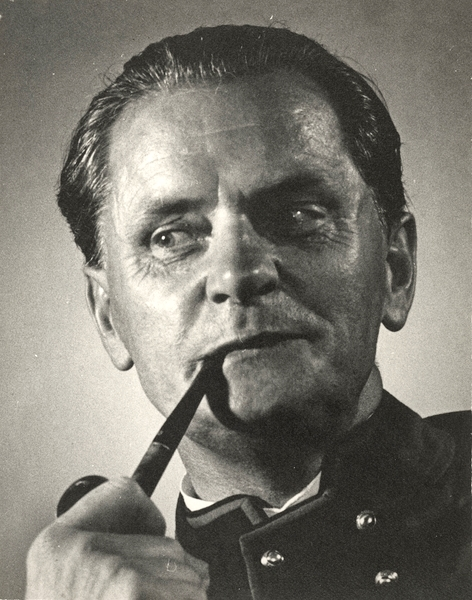
Sæbjørn Buttedahl, 1926

- Hallvard Vebjørnsson (c. 1020 in Lier – 1043) or St. Hallvard, Oslo's patron saint
- Hans Christian Heg (1829 at Haugestad – 1863) Norwegian American abolitionist
- Cæsar Peter Møller Boeck (1845 in Lier – 1917) a Norwegian dermatologist
- Harald Saue (1876 at Saue – 1958) Mayor of Lier in the 1920s and politician for Nasjonal Samling
- Sæbjørn Buttedahl (1876 in Lier – 1960) a Norwegian stage and film actor and sculptor
- Alf Wollebæk (1879 in Lier – 1960) a Norwegian zoologist and curator
- Viggo Brun (1885 in Lier – 1978) a professor, mathematician and number theorist
- Thorleif Haug (1894 in Vivelstad – 1934) skier/ski jumper, he won three Nordic skiing events at the 1924 Winter Olympics
- Kirsten Brunvoll (1895 in Lier – 1976) playwright and resistance member in WWII
- Knut Tvedt (1906 in Lier – 1989) jurist and acting CEO of the NRK 1946 to 1948
- Ole Ivar Lovaas (1927 in Lier – 2010) a Norwegian-American clinical psychologist and pioneering behaviorist
- Gert Nygårdshaug (born 1946) author of poems, children's books and novels; lives in Lier
- Martin Kolberg (born 1949) Norwegian Labour Party secretary 2002/2009; lives in Lier
- Karin Fossum (born 1954) crime fiction author, "Norwegian queen of crime", lives in Sylling
- Frode Kjekstad (born 1974 in Lier) a Norwegian jazz guitarist
- Mads Hansen (born 1984 in Lier) singer and former footballer with over 230 club caps
- Jone (born 1995) singer who was nominated for a Spellemannprisen

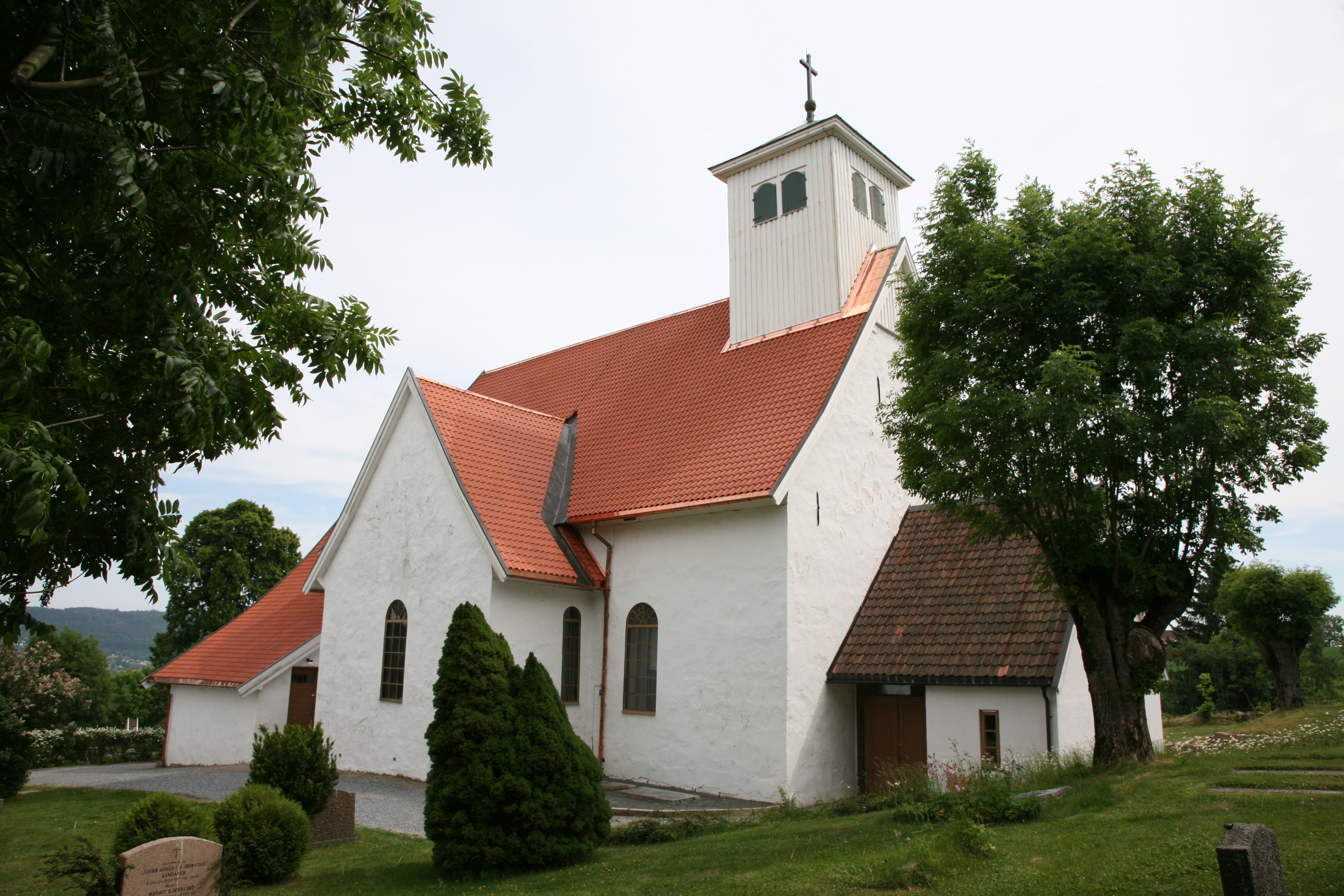
Frogner Kirke

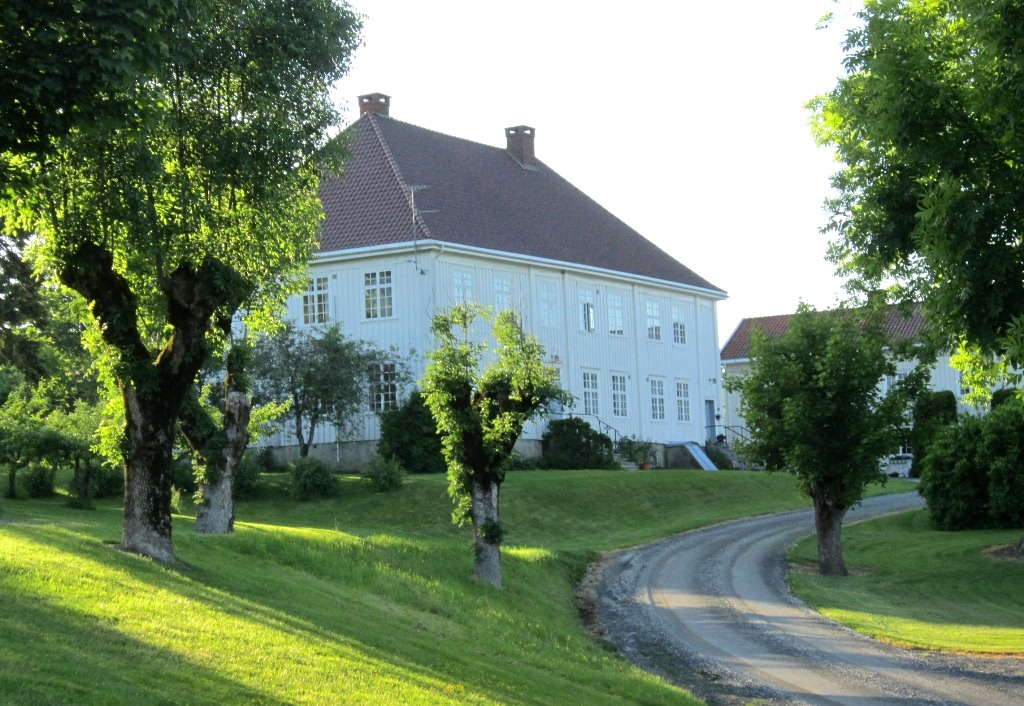
Frogner parsonage

== Twin towns – sister cities ==
Lier is twinned with:

- Falköping, Sweden
- Kokemäki, Finland
- Mariagerfjord, Denmark

== Gallery ==
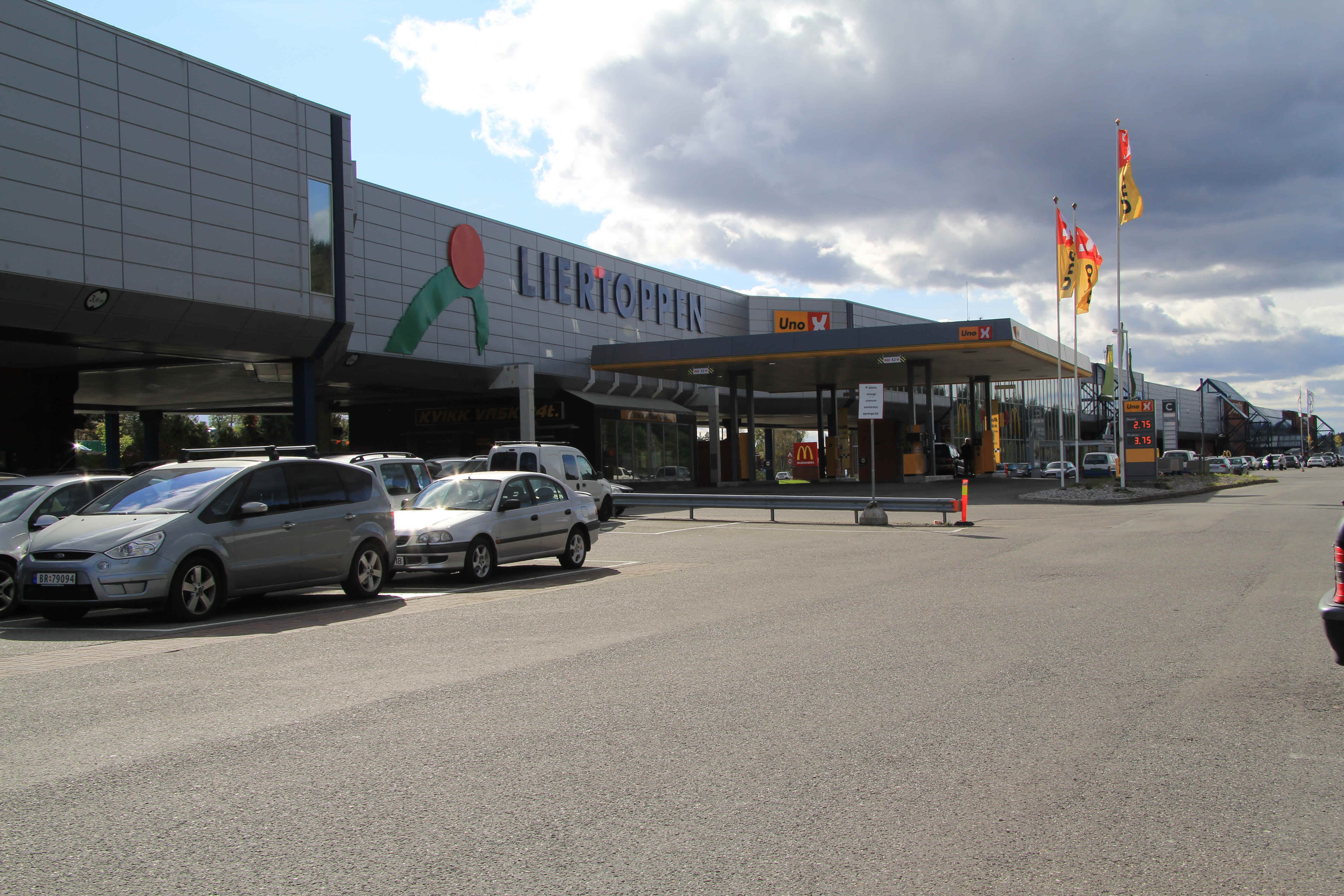
Liertoppen Shopping Center

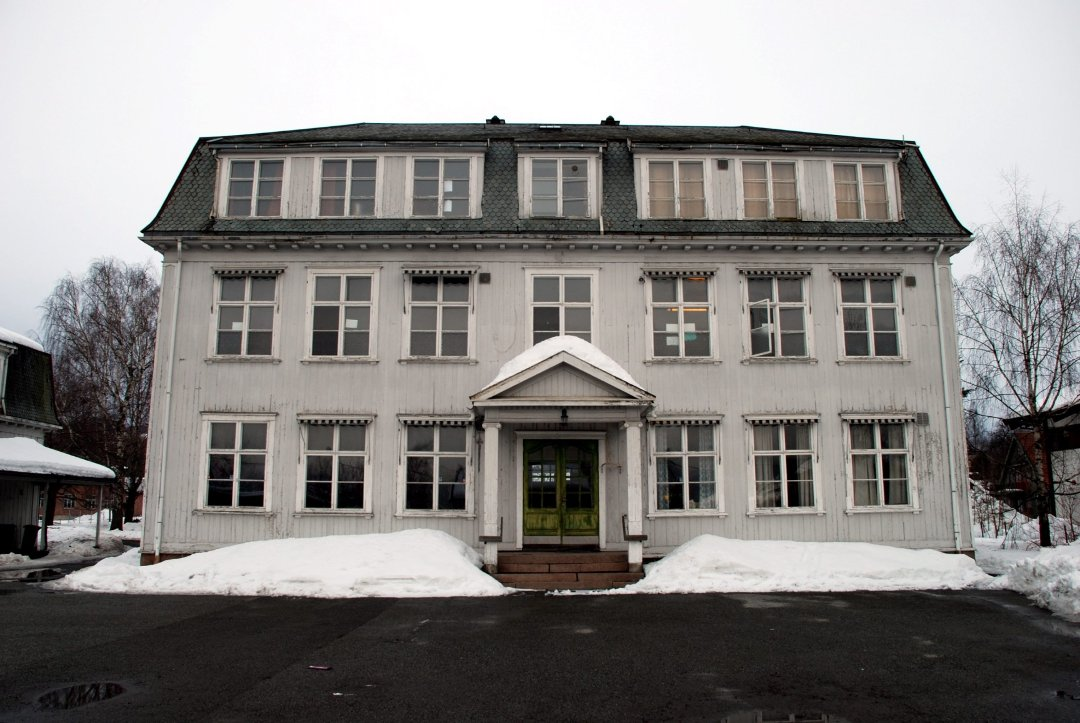
Gamle Hegg skole

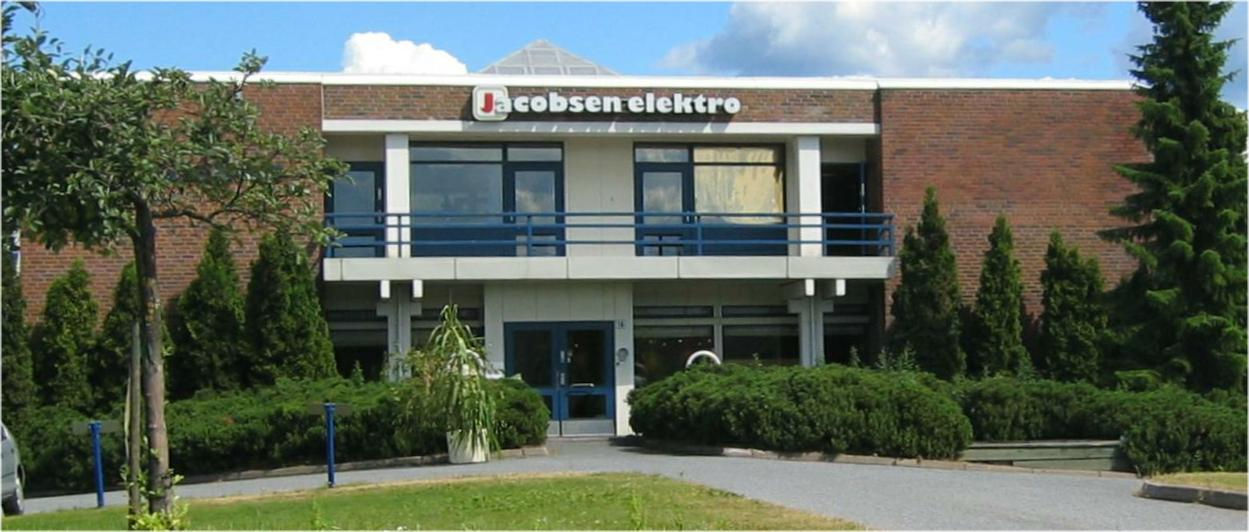
Jacobsen Elektro main office

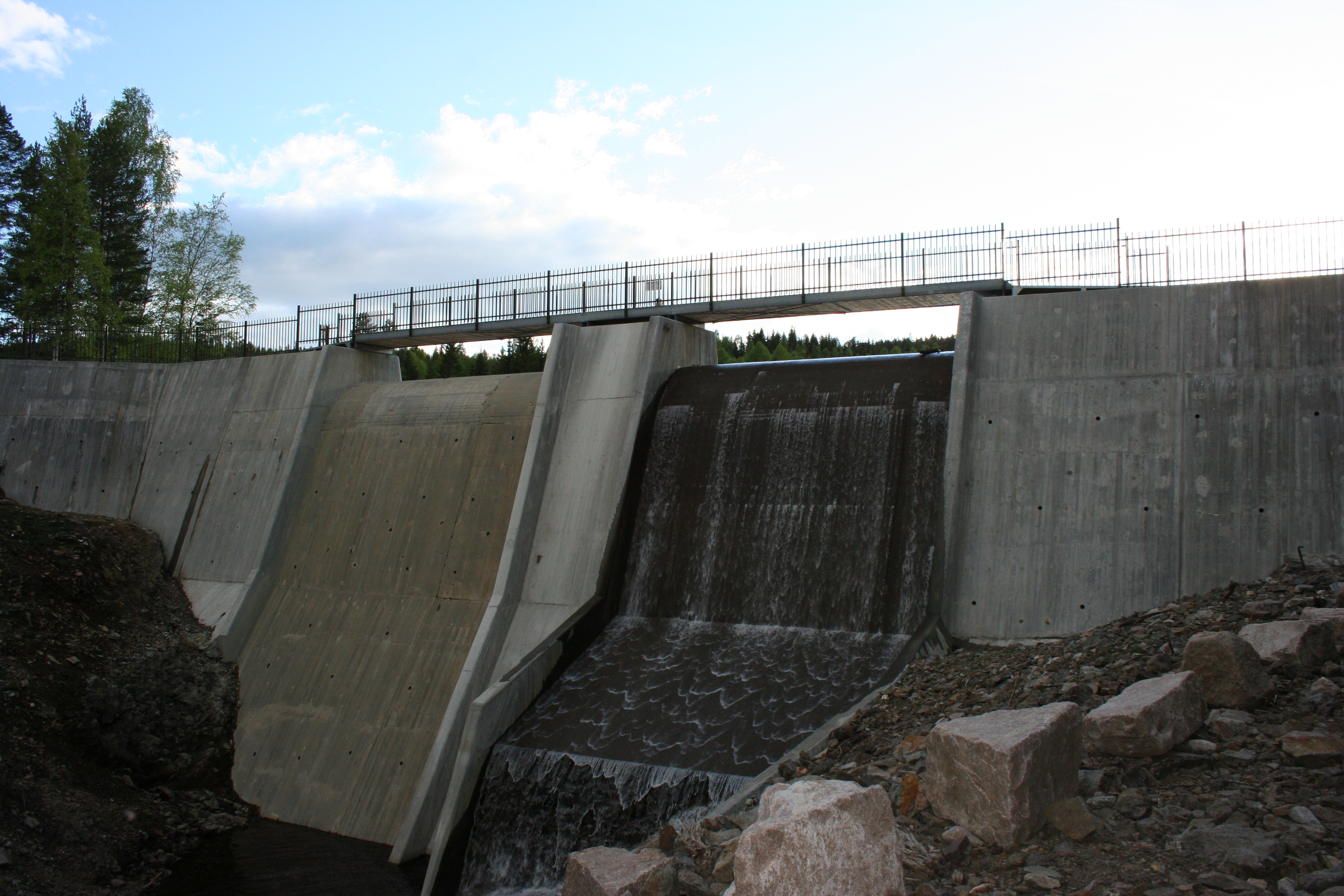
Hvalsdammen
