= Sylling =

Village in Norway

Coordinates: 59°54′N 10°17′E

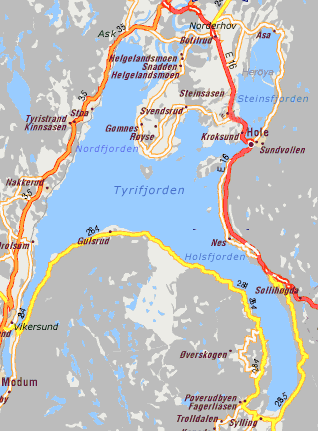
Map of Tyrifjorden with Sylling at the end of Holsfjorden

Sylling is a village in Lier municipality, in the county of Buskerud, Norway. Sylling is located 27 kilometres west of Oslo. The settlement has 707 inhabitants as of 1 January 2016.

== Location ==
Sylling is located on Holsfjorden, the southeastern arm of Tyrifjorden. Sylling is known for agriculture, particularly the cultivation of fruit. Local farms have a long history of cultivation of strawberries and vegetables. The good soil is due to gravel after the Last glacial period including Sylling-moraine. Its population is about 1700.

== History ==
Pilgrims' Way (Pilegrimsleden) must have passed Sylling and stopped at the local Olav's spring (Olavskilden). The pilgrims arrived on foot or they could travel by boat across Holsfjorden. During the Civil war era in Norway, King Sverre and the Birchleg forces overcame the Bagler forces of Magnus V at the Battle of Hørte Bridge (Slaget ved Hørte bro) during the Summer of 1178. The victory was the first of many for Sverre. Subsequently, during autumn, the Birchlegs went north to Trøndelag and won control of Nidaros.

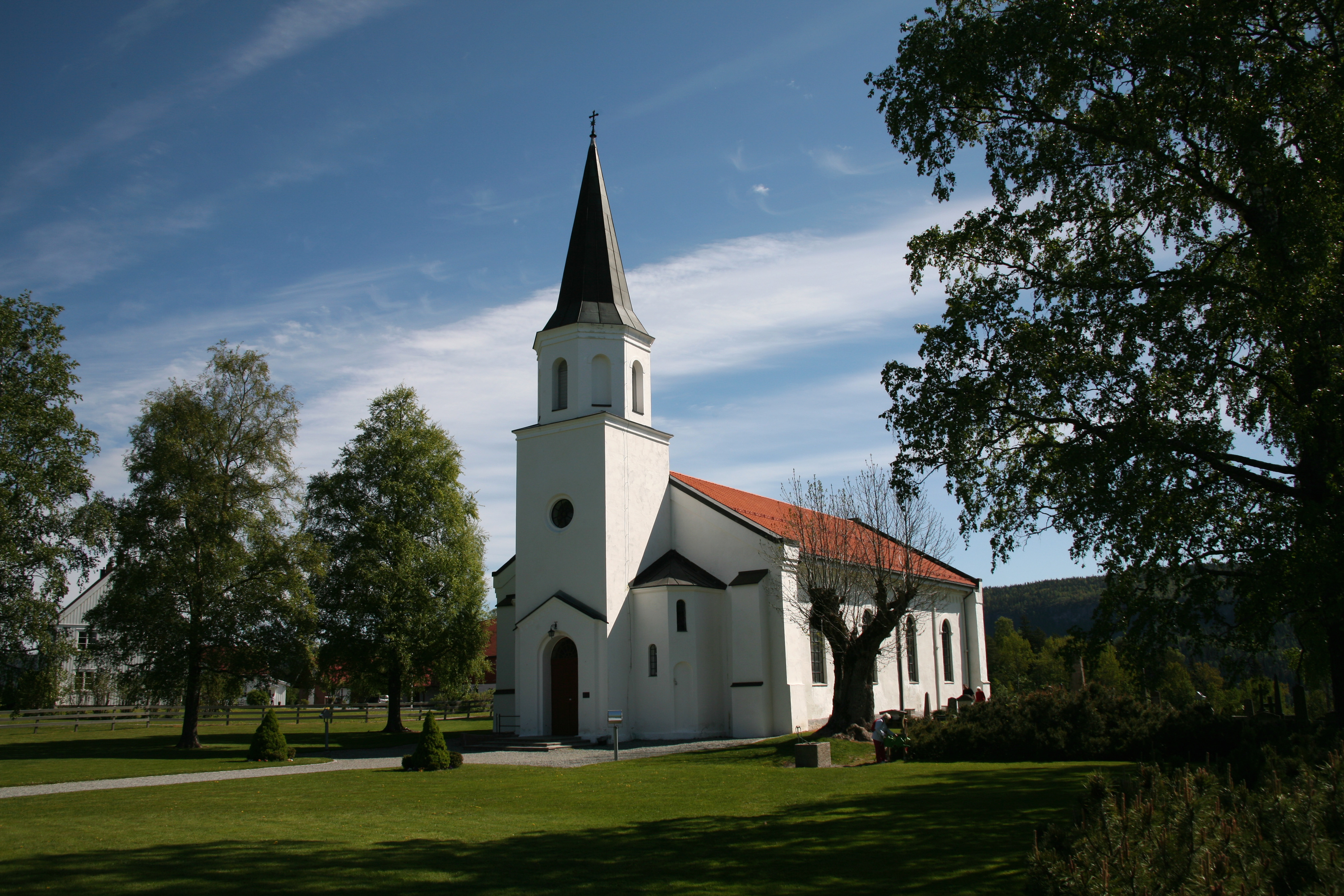
Sylling Church

== Sylling Church ==
Sylling Church (Sylling kirke) is a church constructed in a rectangular shape. There has been a church on the same site since the Middle Ages. The church has a cemetery and next to it is the old rectory. The structure is of stone and brick and the church has 370 seats. Sylling church was built in 1852. In 2001, there were major renovation. At that time some old gravestones with inscriptions and some other items were found which were of interest to the National Cultural Heritage (Riksantikvaren). The church was re-opened for normal use again in December 2001.

== Other sources ==
- Krag, Claus (2005) Sverre, Norges største middelalderkonge ISBN 82-03-23201-9
