= Los Angeles Times Book Prize for Mystery/Thriller =

Annual literary prize

The Los Angeles Times Book Prize for Mystery/Thriller, established in 2000, is a category of the Los Angeles Times Book Prize. Works are eligible during the year of their first US publication in English, though they may be written originally in languages other than English.

== Recipients ==
Los Angeles Times Book Prize for Mystery/Thriller winners and finalists
Year	Author	Title	Result	Ref.
2000	Val McDermid	A Place of Execution	Winner	
2000	Michael Dibdin	Blood Rain: An Aurelio Zen Mystery	Finalist	
2000	Peter Robinson	Cold Is the Grave	Finalist	
2000	James Lee Burke	Purple Cane Road	Finalist	
2000	George P. Pelecanos	Shame the Devil	Finalist	
2001	T. Jefferson Parker	Silent Joe	Winner	
2001	David Fulmer	Chasing the Devil’s Tail: A Mystery of Storyville, New Orleans	Finalist	
2001	Henry Bromell	Little America	Finalist	
2001	C. J. Box	Open Season: A Joe Pickett Novel	Finalist	
2001	Marshall Browne	The Wooden Leg of Inspector Anders	Finalist	
2002	George P. Pelecanos	Hell to Pay	Winner	
2002	Tod Goldberg	Living Dead Girl	Finalist	
2002	Henning Mankell and Ebba Segerberg	One Step Behind	Finalist	
2002	Scott Turow	Reversible Errors	Finalist	
2002	Stephen L. Carter	The Emperor of Ocean Park	Finalist	
2003	George P. Pelecanos	Soul Circus	Winner	
2003	Rebecca Pawel	Death of a Nationalist	Finalist	
2003	Neil Gordon	The Company You Keep	Finalist	
2003	Henning Mankell and Laurie Thompson	The Dogs of Riga	Finalist	
2003	Peter Lovesey	The House Sitter	Finalist	
2004	Kem Nunn	Tijuana Straits	Winner	
2004	Ian Rankin	A Question of Blood	Finalist	
2004	Alan Furst	Dark Voyage	Finalist	
2004	Charles McCarry	Old Boys	Finalist	
2004	Henning Mankell and Laurie Thompson	The Return of the Dancing Master	Finalist	
2005	Robert Littell	Legends	Winner	
2005	John Harvey	Ash & Bone	Finalist	
2005	Peter Robinson	Strange Affair	Finalist	
2005	Michael Connelly	The Lincoln Lawyer	Finalist	
2005	James Crumley	The Right Madness	Finalist	
2006	Michael Connelly	Echo Park	Winner	
2006	Patrick Neate	City of Tiny Lights	Finalist	
2006	George P. Pelecanos	The Night Gardener	Finalist	
2006	Don Winslow	The Winter of Frankie Machine	Finalist	
2006	Jess Walter	The Zero	Finalist	
2007	Karin Fossum with Charlotte Barslund (trans.)	The Indian Bride	Winner	
2007	Benjamin Black	Christine Falls	Finalist	
2007	Åke Edwardson	Frozen Tracks	Finalist	
2007	Jan Costin Wagner	Ice Moon	Finalist	
2007	Tana French	In the Woods	Finalist	
2008	Michael Koryta	Envy the Night	Winner	
2008	Simon Lewis	Bad Traffic	Finalist	
2008	Tom Rob Smith	Child 44	Finalist	
2008	Nina Revoyr	The Age of Dreaming	Finalist	
2008	Colin Harrison	The Finder	Finalist	
2009	Stuart Neville	The Ghosts of Belfast	Winner	
2009	Val McDermid	A Darker Domain	Finalist	
2009	Attica Locke	Black Water Rising	Finalist	
2009	Megan Abbott	Bury Me Deep	Finalist	
2009	David Ellis	The Hidden Man	Finalist	
2010	Tom Franklin	Crooked Letter, Crooked Letter	Winner	
2010	Kelli Stanley	City of Dragons	Finalist	
2010	Stuart Neville	Collusion	Finalist	
2010	Tana French	Faithful Place	Finalist	
2010	Laura Lippman	I’d Know You Anywhere	Finalist	
2011	Stephen King	11/22/63	Winner	
2011	Eoin Colfer	Plugged	Finalist	
2011	A.D. Miller	Snowdrops	Finalist	
2011	Kate Atkinson	Started Early, Took My Dog	Finalist	
2011	Denise Mina	The End of the Wasp Season	Finalist	
2012	Tana French	Broken Harbor	Winner	
2012	Nick Harkaway	Angelmaker	Finalist	
2012	Chris Pavone	The Expats	Finalist	
2012	Fuminori Nakamura	The Thief	Finalist	
2012	Ariel S. Winter	The Twenty-Year Death	Finalist	
2013	Robert Galbraith (J. K. Rowling)	The Cuckoo's Calling	Winner	
2013	Richard Crompton	Hour of the Red God	Finalist	
2013	John Grisham	Sycamore Row	Finalist	
2013	Ferdinand von Schirach	The Collini Case	Finalist	
2013	Gene Kerrigan	The Rage	Finalist	
2014	Tom Bouman	Dry Bones in the Valley	Winner	
2014	Laura Lippman	After I’m Gone	Finalist	
2014	Shawn Lawrence Otto	Sins of Our Fathers	Finalist	
2014	Peter Swanson	The Girl With a Clock for a Heart	Finalist	
2014	Peter Heller	The Painter	Finalist	
2015	Don Winslow	The Cartel	Winner	
2015	Brian Panowich	Bull Mountain	Finalist	
2015	Lou Berney	The Long and Faraway Gone	Finalist	
2015	Viet Thanh Nguyen	The Sympathizer	Finalist	
2015	Richard Price	The Whites	Finalist	
2016	Bill Beverly	Dodgers	Winner	
2016	Thomas Mullen	Darktown	Finalist	
2016	Emma Cline	The Girls	Finalist	
2016	Graeme Macrae Burnet	His Bloody Project: Documents Relating to the Case of Roderick Macrae	Finalist	
2016	Ian McGuire	The North Water	Finalist	
2017	Joyce Carol Oates	A Book of American Martyrs	Winner	
2017	Attica Locke	Bluebird, Bluebird	Finalist	
2017	Michael Connelly	The Late Show	Finalist	
2017	Paul LaFarge	The Night Ocean	Finalist	
2017	Ivy Pochoda	Wonder Valley	Finalist	
2018	Oyinkan Braithwaite	My Sister, the Serial Killer	Winner	
2018	Megan Abbott	Give Me Your Hand	Finalist	
2018	Kent Anderson	Green Sun	Finalist	
2018	Lou Berney	November Road	Finalist	
2018	Leïla Slimani	The Perfect Nanny	Finalist	
2019	Steph Cha	Your House Will Pay	Winner	
2019	Attica Locke	Heaven, My Home	Finalist	
2019	Laura Lippman	Lady In the Lake	Finalist	
2019	Jane Harper	The Lost Man	Finalist	
2019	Michael Connelly	The Night Fire	Finalist	
2020	S. A. Cosby	Blacktop Wasteland	Winner	
2020	Rachel Howzell Hall	And Now She’s Gone	Finalist	
2020	Christopher Bollen	A Beautiful Crime	Finalist	
2020	Jennifer Hillier	Little Secrets	Finalist	
2020	Ivy Pochoda	These Women	Finalist	
2021	Megan Abbott	The Turnout	Winner	
2021	Alison Gaylin	The Collective	Finalist	
2021	Michael Connelly	The Dark Hours	Finalist	
2021	S. A. Cosby	Razorblade Tears	Finalist	
2021	Silvia Moreno-Garcia	Velvet Was the Night	Finalist	
2022	Alex Segura	Secret Identity	Winner	
2022	Rachel Howzell Hall	We Lie Here	Finalist	
2022	Laurie R. King	Back to the Garden	Finalist	
2022	Tracy Lien	All That's Left Unsaid	Finalist	
2022	Peng Shepherd	The Cartographers	Finalist	
2023	Ivy Pochoda	Sing Her Down	Winner	
2023	Lou Berney	Dark Ride	Finalist	
2023	S. A. Cosby	All the Sinners Bleed	Finalist	
2023	Jordan Harper	Everybody Knows	Finalist	
2023	Cheryl A. Head	Time’s Undoing	Finalist	
