= Pochoda =

Pochoda is a surname. Notable people with the surname include:

- Elizabeth Pochoda (1941–2025), American journalist
- Ivy Pochoda (born 1977), American novelist and former professional squash player
