= Stephen Hogan =

Irish actor

- Born: August 1965 (age 61); Dublin, Ireland
- Education: Edinburgh University; Royal Conservatoire of Scotland
- Occupations: actor; narrator
- Years active: 1993–present

Stephen Hogan is an Irish actor and audiobook narrator.

== Biography ==
Hogan was born in August 1965 and grew up in Dartry, Dublin, Ireland. He is the son of Brian Hogan, a prominent Dublin architect, and Marie née Lawton. His grandfather, Sarsfield Hogan, was a noted Irish civil servant and insurance company executive. Stephen says he studied architecture at Edinburgh University but upon graduating did not see himself in that profession for the remainder of his life. He says he obtained financially useful scholarship to Royal College of Music and Drama in Glasgow (Royal Conservatoire of Scotland), and was also able to obtain a part-time job in an architect's office at the same time.

Upon qualifying from drama school in 1992 Hogan says he was lucky to get a role on the long running Scottish Soap drama Take the High Road with its "crazy characters", his recollections of his storylines as new character was "I worked my way through the entire female case over 60 episodes". He moved to London after leaving the soap, but has returned to Ireland frequently for work and pleasure since.

His uncle, Paul Hogan, was one of two students behind the audacious 1956 theft of Summer's Day from the Tate Gallery. Hogan played his uncle in a radio play based on the event in 2005, and is collaboration on attempts to develop a film based on the theft. Hogan states on Twitter he is a director of Gallery Films.

Hogan adapted to the UK's first COVID-19 lockdown by adapting purchasing a quality digital microphone and investing in acoustic paneling which enabled him to record audiobooks such as City in Flames, though he says building work pile-driving near his home has caused inconveniences. He say he voiced the character Kurtz from the Conrad novel Heart of Darkness from his home for a BBC4 production.

Hogan has interviewed about the upcoming Netflix 2022 release of Vikings: Valhalla where he has the character of Ealdorman Sigeferth of Wessex.

== Works ==
=== Film ===
Hogan played Sky Marshall Omar Anoke, a major role in science-fiction film Starship Troopers 3: Marauder. He played the lead role of Adam Smith in Iraq war drama Kingdom of Dust: Beheading of Adam Smith, in which critic Justin Richards averred that he "manages to portray an okay representation" of hostage Adam Smith.

Year	Title	Role	References and notes
1996	Some Mother's Son	Young Turk	
1999	Vicious Circle	Frankie	
2003	Benedict Arnold: A Question of Honor	Joseph Reed	
2008	Starship Troopers 3: Marauder	Sky Marshall Omar Anoke	
2009	Terror! Robespierre and the French Revolution	Maximilien Robespierre	Drama-Documentary; Lead role
2011	Kingdom of Dust: Beheading of Adam Smith	Adam David Smith	Lead role
2013	The Sweeter Side of Life	Wade Harper	
2013	Dracula: The Dark Prince	Renfield	
2013	Earthbound	Dr. Richard Webb	
2016	Jarhead 3: The Siege	Ambassador Dan Cahill	
2016	Handsome Devil	Connor Master's dad	
2017	The Foreigner	henchman Christy Murphy	
2017	Transformers: The Last Knight	Viviane Wembly's Father	
2017	The Young Karl Marx	Thomas Naylor	
2018	We Have Always Lived in the Castle	John Blackwood	
2018	Show Dogs	Bullmastiff, Canini Announcer	
2020	Dragon Rider	Spinecrackle (voiceover)	
2021	Sardar Udham	Detective Inspector Swain	Indian Hindi-language film

=== Television ===
Year	Title	Role	Notes
1993	Take the High Road	Nick Stapleton	
1995	Fair City	Sam Costigan/Sam Maguire/Brian Sweeney	
1996	The Governor	Declan Lowndes	
2002	Doctors	Robert Brackley/Blake Calverly	
2005	Totally Frank	Freddie	
2006	The Line of Beauty	News presenter	
2008	The Tudors	Sir Henry Norris	
2011	Primeval	Henry Merchant	
2011	Injustice	Eric Duncann	
2012	Saving the Titanic	Thomas Andrews	
2015	X Company	General Ned Butler	
2016	Harley and the Davidsons	U.S. Army general	
2017	Kat & Alfie: Redwater	Padraig Kelly	
2018	They Shall Not Grow Old	Various character voicing	
2020	Thieves of the Wood	Meyvis (English re-voice of principal character)	
2021	Capitani	English re-voice of series regular	
2021	Red Election	MI5 agent Alaric Henderson	
2021	Ridley Road	George Lincoln Rockwell	
2022	Vikings: Valhalla	Sigeferth, Ealdorman of Wessex	

=== Radio and audio ===
Hogan has also narrated a number of audiobook recordings with Penguin Random House. The audio book of The Secret Place won Library Journal's Best Media 2014. His respective narration in The Heart's Invisible Furies and Typhoon won the AudioFile Magazine Earphone Awards.

Year	Title	Role	Notes
1999	Hamlet	Rosencrantz	
2005	Taking the Picture	Paul Hogan (his uncle)	
2007	Hellgate: London	Video game Voice actor	
2008	The Secret Scripture	Audiobook narrator	
2009	Killzone 2	Video game voice actor for Helghast	
2009	The Saboteur	Video game voice actor for Sean Devlin	
2009	Typhoon	Audiobook narrator	
2010	The Robot Wars / Penrose Series	Audiobook narrator	
2011	The Plough and the Stars	Peter	
2012	Broken Harbour	Audiobook narrator	
2012	The Zombie Survival Guide	Audiobook narrator	
2014	Divinity: Original Sin	Video game voice actor	
2014	Lords of the Fallen	Video game voice actor	
2014	The Secret Place	One of the audiobook narrators	
2016	Murphy	Audiobook narrator	
2016	Hunters in the Dark	Audiobook narrator	
2017	The Heart's Invisible Furies	Audiobook narrator	
2017	Divinity: Original Sin II	Video game voice actor for Goblin King	
2017	Midwinter Break	Audiobook narrator	
2018	Michael O'Leary	Audiobook narrator	
2018	Last Stories	One of the audiobook narrators	
2018	The Heather Blazing	Audiobook narrator	
2018–20	Skulduggery Pleasant	Audiobook narrator	
2019–20	Three books of The Sonchai Jitpleecheep Series	Audiobook narrator	
2020	Weird Tales	One of the audiobook narrators	
2020	Little Cruelties	One of the audiobook narrators	
2020	The Guns of Easter	Audiobook narrator	
2021	Heart of Darkness	Kurtz (audiobook)	
2021	Cowboys and Indians	Audiobook narrator	
2021	Sláine the Horned God (Sláine series)	One of the audiobook narrators	
2021	Mosley Must Fall	Liam McEnroe	
2023	Baldur's Gate III	Volo	

=== Theatre and musical ===
Having trained at Royal Conservatoire of Scotland, he has worked extensively in UK and Irish theaters.

Year	Title	Role	Location
2019	Napoli, Brooklyn, directed by Lisa Blair	Albert Duffy	Oxford Playhouse
2018	Mad as Hell, directed by Cassie McFarlane	Peter Finch/Howard Beale (lead role)	Jermyn Street Theatre
2011	The Field, directed by Joe Dowling	Willie Dee	Royal Theatre
2006	Merrily We Roll Along, directed by Karen Louise Hebden	Jerome	Derby Playhouse
2006	The Importance of Being Earnest, directed by Conall Morrison	Algernon Moncrieff	Abbey Theatre
2004	A Doll's House, directed by Graham McLaren	Torvald Helmer	Perth Theatre
2002	Possible Worlds, directed by Adrian Osmond	George Barber (lead role)	Tron Theatre
2001	The Playboy of the Western World, directed by Robert Delamere	Shawn Keogh	Liverpool Playhouse
2000	Medea, directed by Graham McLaren	Jason	Old Fruit Market of Glasgow
2000	Peer Gynt, directed by Conall Morrison	Bigriffenfeldt	Royal National Theatre
1999	Fast Food, directed by Marianne Elliott	Billy (lead role)	Manchester Royal Exchange
1998	Richard III, directed by Paul Kerryson	King Edward IV & Sir William Catesby	Leicester Haymarket Theatre
1998	Saint Joan, directed by Patrick Mason	John de Stogumber, English chaplain	Abbey Theater
1997	The Heiress, directed by Michael Colgan and Michael Rudman	Morris Townsend (lead role)	Gate Theatre
1995	Angels in America, directed by Patrick Mason and Conall Morrison	Joe Pitt, The Eskimo, Ghost Prior	Abbey Theatre
