= The Searchers =

1956 film by John Ford

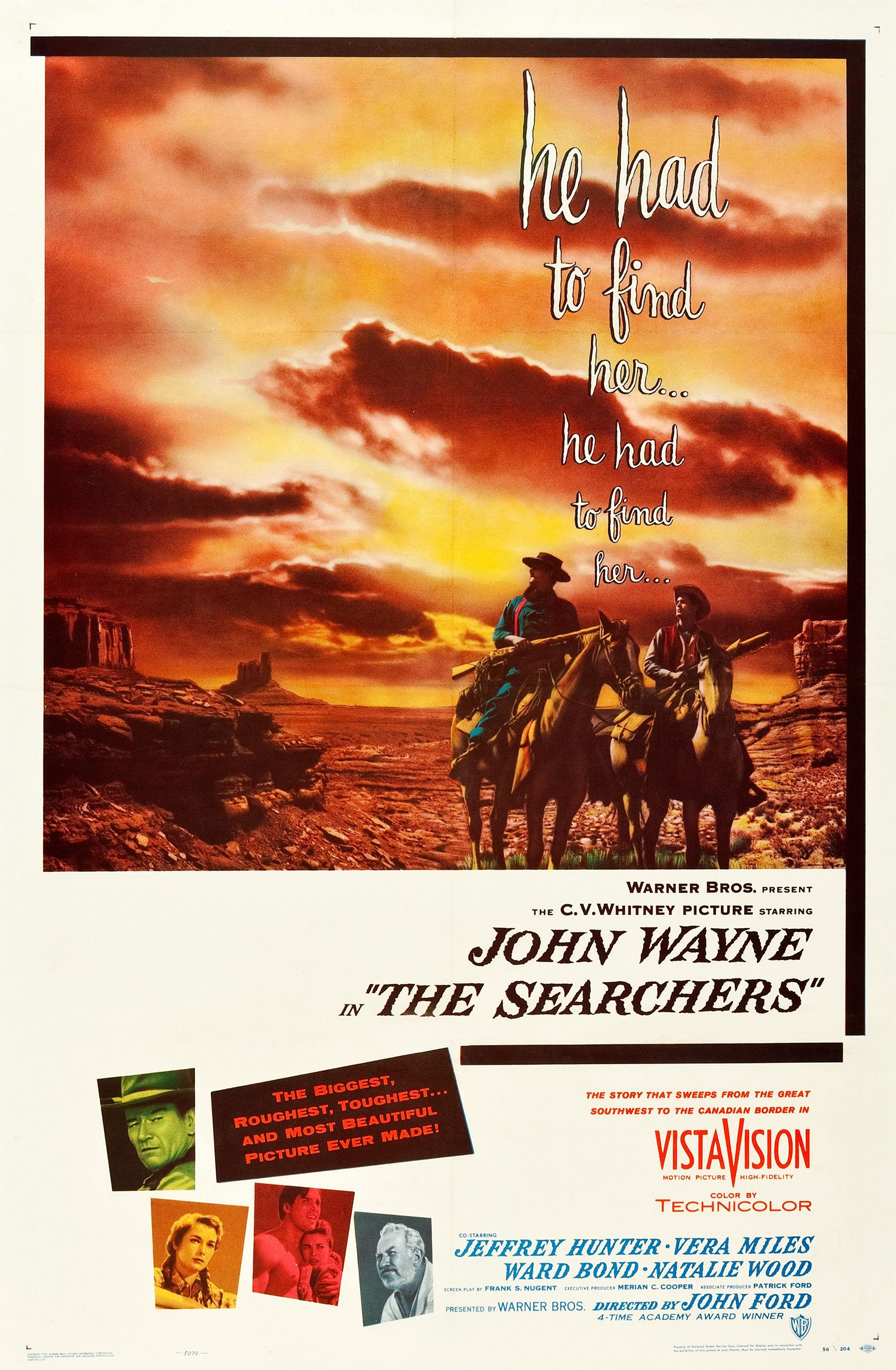
- Theatrical release poster by Bill Gold
- Directed by: John Ford
- Screenplay by: Frank S. Nugent
- Based on: The Searchers; 1954 novel by Alan Le May
- Starring: John Wayne; Jeffrey Hunter; Vera Miles; Ward Bond; Natalie Wood
- Cinematography: Winton C. Hoch
- Edited by: Jack Murray
- Music by: Max Steiner
- Production company: C.V. Whitney Pictures
- Distributed by: Warner Bros.
- Release date: May 16, 1956 (Chicago Theatre)
- Running time: 119 minutes
- Country: United States
- Language: English
- Budget: $3.75 million

The Searchers is a 1956 American epic Western film directed by John Ford and written by Frank S. Nugent, based on the 1954 novel by Alan Le May. It is set during the Texas–Indian wars and stars John Wayne as a middle-aged veteran of the Confederate Army who, accompanied by his adopted, partially Native American nephew (Jeffrey Hunter), spends years looking for his abducted niece (Natalie Wood). It was shot in VistaVision on Eastmancolor negative with processing and prints by Technicolor.

The film was a critical and commercial success. Since its release, it has come to be considered a masterpiece and one of the greatest and most influential films ever made. It was named the greatest American Western by the American Film Institute in 2008, and it placed 12th on the same organization's 2007 list of the 100 greatest American movies of all time. Entertainment Weekly also named it the best Western. The British Film Institute's Sight and Sound magazine ranked it as the seventh-best film of all time based on a 2012 international survey of film critics and in 2008, the French magazine Cahiers du Cinéma ranked The Searchers number 10 in their list of the 100 best films ever made.

In 1989, The Searchers was deemed "culturally, historically, or aesthetically significant" by the United States Library of Congress and was selected for preservation in its National Film Registry; it was one of the first 25 films selected for the registry.

The Searchers was perhaps the first major film to have an intentionally filmed documentary about the making of it, requested by John Ford. It deals with most aspects of making the film, including preparation of the site, construction of props, and filming techniques.

== Plot ==
In 1868, Ethan Edwards returns after an eight-year absence to the home of his brother Aaron in West Texas. Ethan fought in the Civil War on the side of the Confederacy. In the three years since that war ended, he also apparently fought in the Second Franco–Mexican War. He has in his possession many gold coins of uncertain origin. He also has a medal from the Mexican campaign, which he gives to his eight-year-old niece, Debbie. As a former Confederate soldier, when he is asked to take an oath of allegiance to the Texas Rangers, he refuses.

Shortly after Ethan's arrival, cattle belonging to his neighbor Lars Jorgensen are stolen, by Indians they believe, and Rev. Captain Samuel Clayton leads Ethan and a group of Rangers to recover them. After discovering that the theft was a Comanche ploy to draw the men away from their families, they race back, to find the Edwards homestead in flames. Aaron, his wife Martha, and their son Ben have all been killed, while Debbie and her older sister Lucy have been abducted.

After a brief funeral, the men set out in pursuit. When they find the Comanche camp, Ethan recommends a frontal attack, but Clayton insists on a stealth approach to avoid killing the hostages. The camp turns out to be deserted. Further along the trail, the men ride into an ambush. Despite fending off the attack, the Rangers are left with too few men to fight the Comanche effectively.

They return to their base, but Ethan insists on continuing his search for the girls, joined by Lucy's fiancé, Brad Jorgensen, and Debbie's adoptive brother Martin Pawley, who is part Cherokee. Ethan finds Lucy murdered (and, it is implied, raped) in a canyon near the Comanche camp. In a blind rage, Brad rides directly into the camp to attack the warriors and is killed. Ethan and Martin continue.

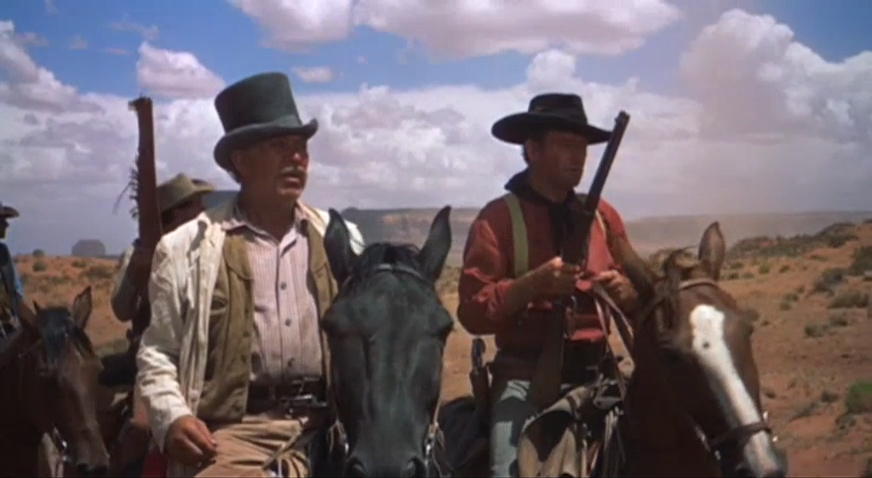
"I figure on gettin' myself unsurrounded," insists Captain Clayton to Ethan as they realize they are caught in a trap and must run for their lives.

When winter arrives, Ethan and Martin lose the trail and return to the Jorgensen ranch. Martin is enthusiastically welcomed by the Jorgensens' daughter Laurie, and Ethan finds a letter waiting for him from a trader named Futterman, who claims to have information about Debbie. Ethan, who would rather travel alone, leaves without Martin the next morning, but Laurie reluctantly provides Martin with a horse to catch up. At Futterman's trading post, Ethan and Martin learn that Debbie has been taken by Scar, the chief of the Nawyecka band of Comanche.

A year or more later, Laurie receives a letter from Martin describing the ongoing search. Reading the letter aloud, Laurie narrates the next few scenes. Ethan kills Futterman for trying to steal his money, and Martin accidentally buys a Comanche woman as a wife. She runs away when she hears the men mention their hunt for Scar. Later, they find her among the dead Comanche of Scar's band, who were killed by soldiers.

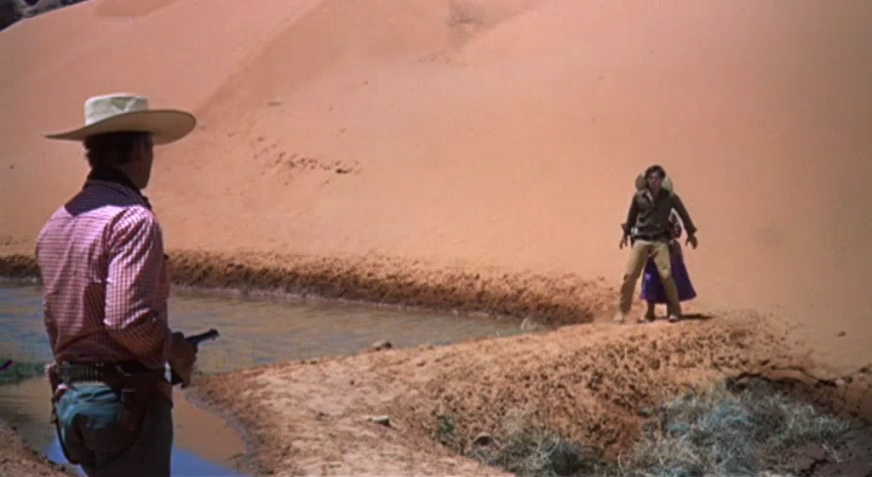
Martin shields Ethan's niece to prevent Ethan from murdering her.

In New Mexico Territory, after five years, they find Debbie, now an adolescent, living as one of Scar's wives. She says that she has become a Comanche and wishes to remain with them. Ethan would rather see her dead than living that way, and tries to shoot her, but Martin shields her with his body. A Comanche wounds Ethan with an arrow as the two men escape. Although Martin tends to Ethan's wound, he is furious with him for attempting to kill Debbie. Later, they return home.

Meanwhile, Charlie McCorry has been courting Laurie in Martin's absence. Ethan and Martin arrive home just as Charlie and Laurie's wedding is about to begin. After a fistfight between Martin and Charlie, a nervous Yankee soldier, Lieutenant Greenhill, brings news that Ethan's friend Mose Harper has located Scar.

Clayton leads his men to the Comanche camp, this time for a direct attack, but Martin is allowed to sneak in ahead of the assault to find Debbie, who welcomes him this time. Martin kills Scar to save Debbie. Ethan, finding Scar's body, scalps him for revenge. Ethan finds Debbie, who flees, and pursues her on horseback.

Martin chases them desperately, fearing that Ethan will kill her. Instead, Ethan sweeps her up into his arms and takes her to the Jorgensen ranch, where Martin reunites with Laurie. While everyone else enters the house, Ethan watches, then walks away.

== Cast ==
Original trailer of The Searchers (1956)

- John Wayne as Ethan Edwards
- Jeffrey Hunter as Martin Pawley
- Vera Miles as Laurie Jorgensen
- Ward Bond as Rev. Capt. Samuel Johnson Clayton
- Natalie Wood as adult Debbie Edwards
- John Qualen as Lars Jorgensen
- Olive Carey as Mrs. Jorgensen
- Henry Brandon as Chief Scar
- Ken Curtis as Charlie McCorry
- Harry Carey Jr. as Brad Jorgensen
- Antonio Moreno as Emilio Gabriel Fernández y Figueroa
- Hank Worden as Mose Harper
- Beulah Archuletta as Wild Goose Flying in the Night Sky (Look)
- Walter Coy as Aaron Edwards
- Dorothy Jordan as Martha Edwards
- Pippa Scott as Lucy Edwards
- Patrick Wayne as Lt. Greenhill
- Lana Wood as young Debbie Edwards
- Robert Lyden as Ben Edwards
- Chuck Roberson as Texas Ranger at Wedding
- Jack Pennick as Sergeant at Fort
- Nacho Galindo as Mexican Bartender
- Peter Mamakos as Jerem Futterman

== Production ==
The film was shot in the VistaVision widescreen process.

=== Filming locations ===
While the film was primarily set in the staked plains (Llano Estacado) of northwestern Texas, it was actually filmed in Monument Valley, Arizona/Utah. Additional scenes were filmed in Mexican Hat, Utah, in Bronson Canyon in Griffith Park, Los Angeles, and in Elk Island National Park.

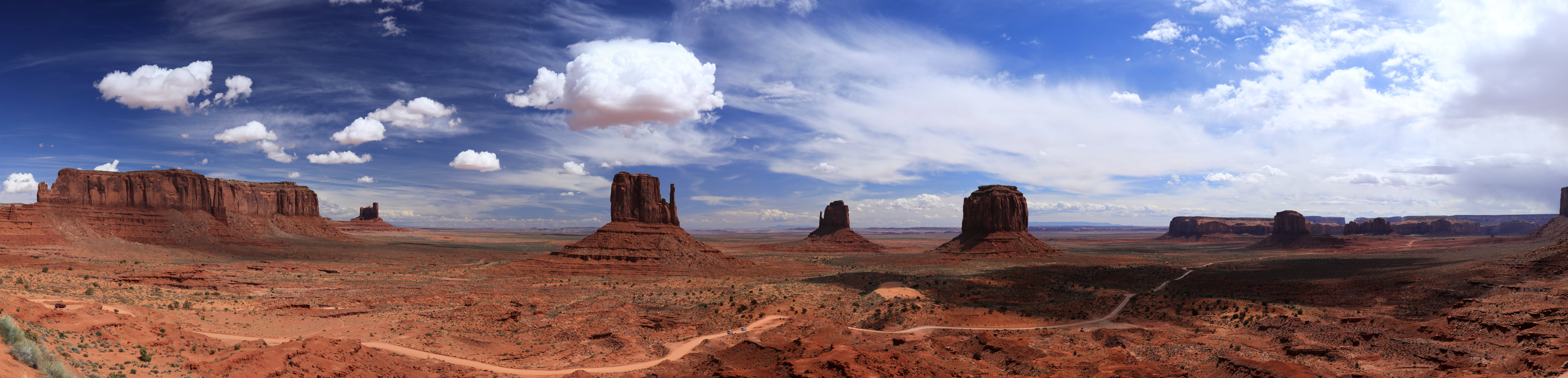

=== Casting ===
Ford originally wanted to cast Fess Parker, whose performance as Davy Crockett on television had helped spark a national craze, for the Martin Pawley role, but Walt Disney, to whom Parker was under contract, refused to allow it and did not tell Parker about the offer, according to Parker's videotaped interview for the Archive of American Television. Parker has said retrospectively that this was easily his worst career reversal.

=== Producers and film crew ===
The Searchers was the first production from "distinguished turfman" Cornelius Vanderbilt Whitney; it was directed by John Ford and distributed by Warner Bros. Pictures Behind the camera film crew included cinematographer Winton C. Hoch and editor Jack Murray.

The Searchers is the first of only three films produced by Whitney's company C.V. Whitney Pictures; the second was The Missouri Traveler in 1958 with Brandon deWilde and Lee Marvin, and the third was The Young Land in 1959 with Wayne's son Patrick Wayne and Dennis Hopper.

=== Promotion ===
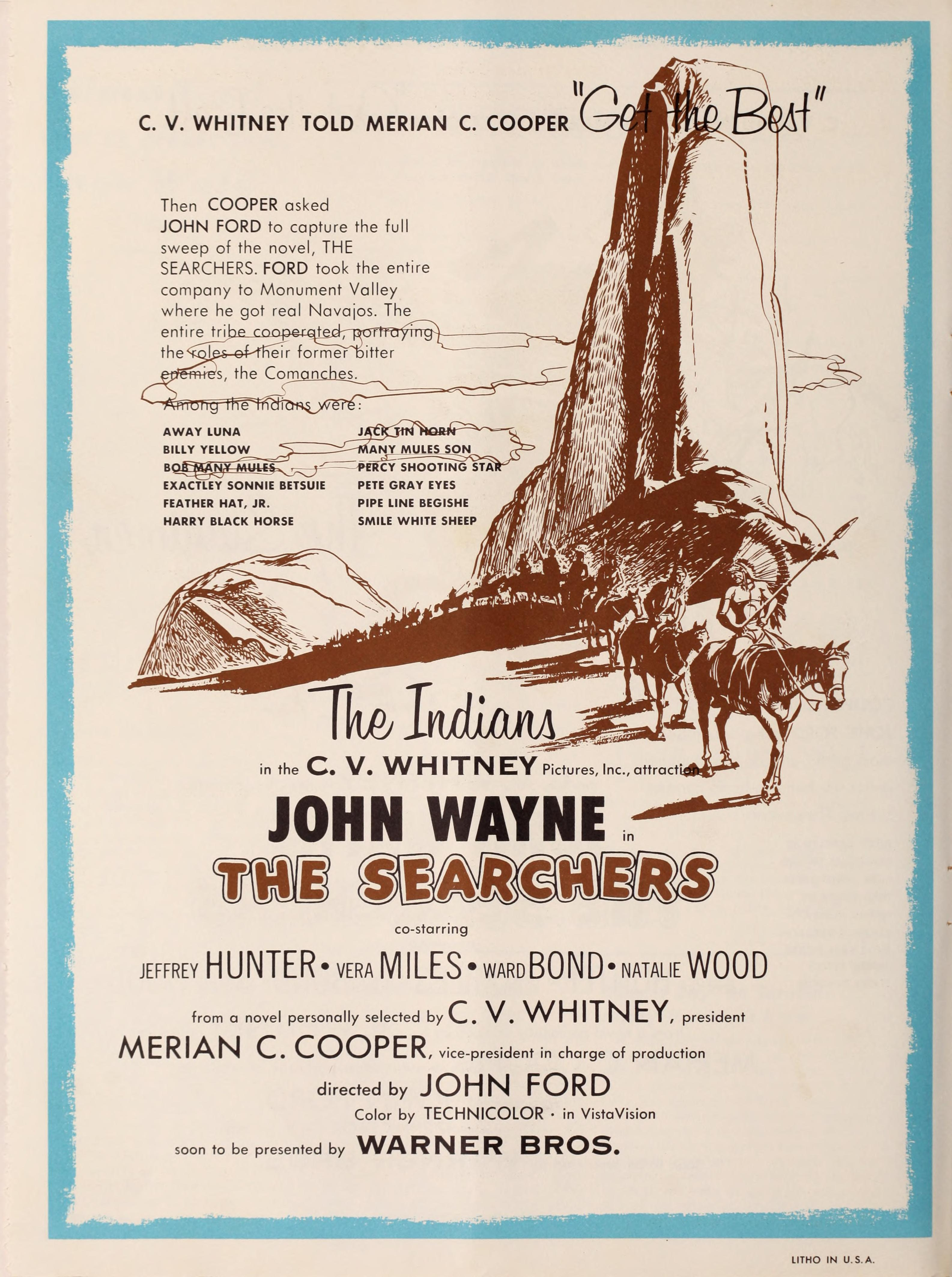
C.V. Whitney Pictures, Inc. trade magazine ad promoting the Native American casting of The Searchers

As part of its promotion of The Searchers in 1956, Warner Bros. produced and broadcast one of the first behind-the-scenes, "making-of" programs in movie history, which aired in 1956 as an episode of its Warner Bros. Presents TV series.

== Historical background ==
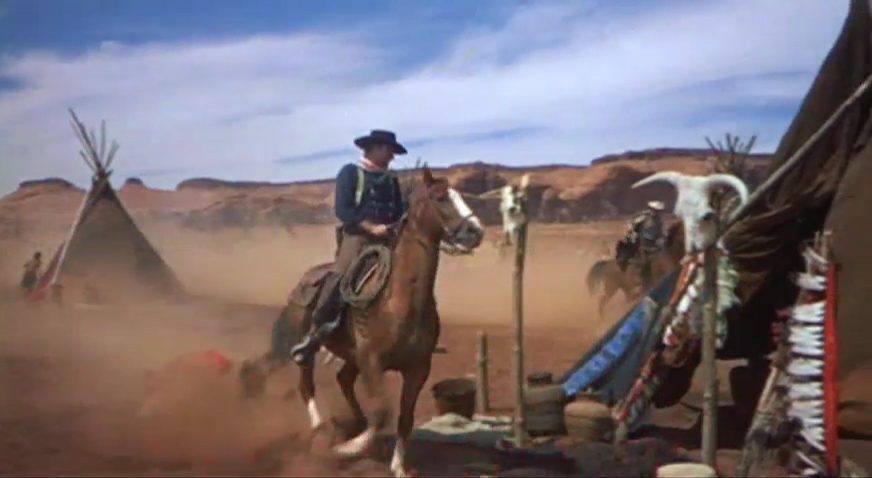
Ethan during an attack on a Native American village

Author Alan Le May's surviving research notes indicate that the two characters who go in search of a missing girl were inspired by Britton Johnson, an African-American teamster who ransomed his captured wife and children from the Comanches in 1865. Afterward, Johnson made at least three trips to Indian Territory and Kansas, relentlessly searching for another kidnapped girl, Millie Durgan (or Durkin), until Kiowa raiders killed him in 1871.

Several film critics have suggested that The Searchers was inspired by the 1836 kidnapping of nine-year-old Cynthia Ann Parker by Comanche warriors, who raided her family's home at Fort Parker, Texas. She spent 24 years with the Comanches, married a war chief, and had three children (one of whom was the famous Comanche Chief Quanah Parker), only to be rescued against her will by Texas Rangers. James W. Parker, Cynthia Ann's uncle, spent much of his life and fortune in what became an obsessive search for his niece, much like Ethan Edwards in the film.

In addition, the rescue of Cynthia Ann, during a Texas Ranger attack known as the Battle of Pease River, resembles the rescue of Debbie Edwards when the Texas Rangers attack Scar's village. Parker's story was only one of 64 real-life cases of 19th-century child abductions in Texas in which author Alan Le May studied the captivity narratives while researching the novel on which the film was based.

The ending of Le May's novel contrasts to the film's, with Debbie running from the white men and the Native Americans. Marty, in one final leg of his search, finds her days later, only after she has fainted from exhaustion.

In the film, Scar's Comanche group is referred to as the Nawyecka, correctly the Noyʉhka or Nokoni, the same band that kidnapped Cynthia Ann Parker. Some film critics have speculated that the historical model for the cavalry attack on a Comanche village, resulting in Look's death and the taking of Comanche prisoners to a military post, was the Battle of the Washita River, November 27, 1868, when Lt. Col. George Armstrong Custer's 7th U.S. Cavalry attacked Black Kettle's Cheyenne camp on the Washita River (near present-day Cheyenne, Oklahoma). The sequence also resembles the 1872 Battle of the North Fork of the Red River, in which the 4th Cavalry captured 124 Comanche women and children and imprisoned them at Fort Concho.

== Reception ==
=== Contemporaneous reviews ===
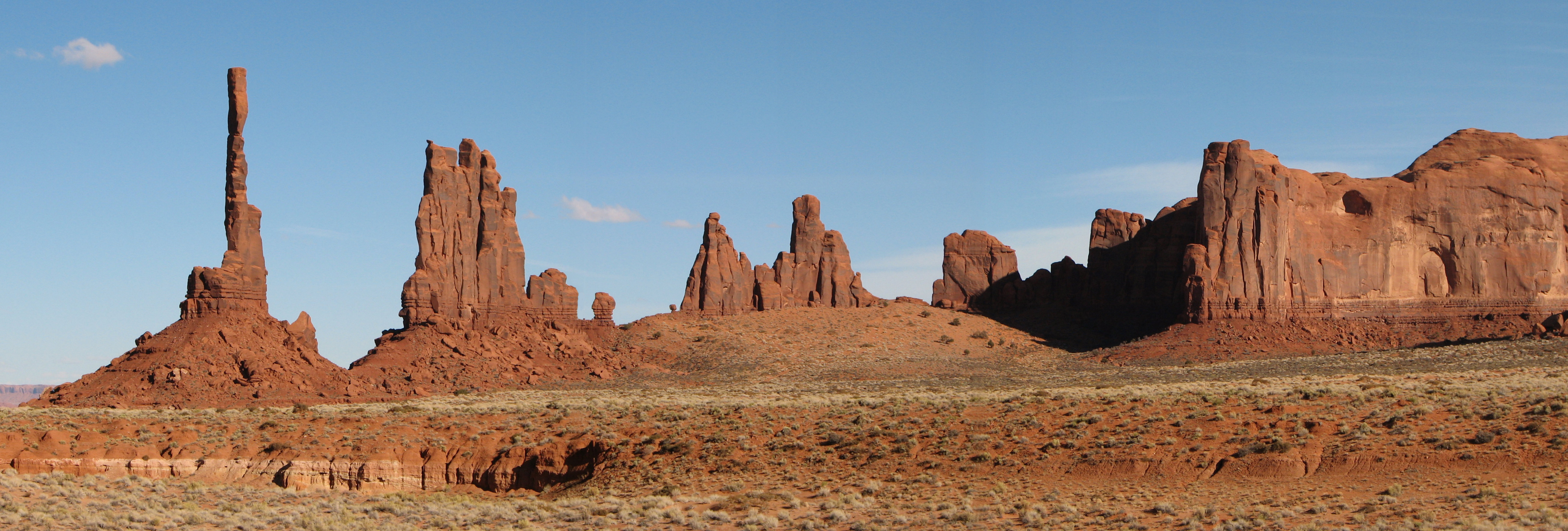
Although the film was set in the flat Llano Estacado of Texas, it was filmed in Monument Valley in Utah.

Upon the film's release, Bosley Crowther of The New York Times called it a "ripsnorting Western" (in spite of the "excessive language in its ads"); he credits Ford's "familiar corps of actors, writers, etc., [who help] to give the gusto to this film. From Frank S. Nugent, whose screenplay from the novel of Alan LeMay is a pungent thing, right on through the cast and technicians, it is the honest achievement of a well-knit team." Crowther noted "two faults of minor moment":

- "Episode is piled upon episode, climax upon climax, and corpse upon corpse... The justification for it is that it certainly conveys the lengthiness of the hunt, but it leaves one a mite exhausted, especially with the speed at which it goes.
- "The director has permitted too many outdoor scenes to be set in the obviously synthetic surroundings of the studio stage... some of those campfire scenes could have been shot in a sporting-goods store window."

Variety called it "handsomely mounted and in the tradition of Shane", yet "somewhat disappointing" due to its length and repetitiveness; "The John Ford directorial stamp is unmistakable. It concentrates on the characters and establishes a definite mood. It's not sufficient, however, to overcome many of the weaknesses of the story."

The New York Herald Tribune termed the movie "distinguished"; Newsweek deemed it "remarkable". Look described The Searchers as a "Homeric odyssey". The New York Times praised Wayne's performance as "uncommonly commanding". The Monthly Film Bulletin wrote, "Though it does not consistently achieve the highest Ford standards, The Searchers is surely the best Western since Shane."

The film earned rentals of $4.8 million in the US and Canada during its first year of release.

The film helped revive the career of Jeffrey Hunter.

=== Later assessments ===
In 2001, critic Roger Ebert found Wayne's character, Ethan Edwards, "one of the most compelling characters Ford and Wayne ever created". Ebert writes: "The Searchers indeed seems to be two films. The Ethan Edwards story is stark and lonely, a portrait of obsession, and in it we can see Schrader's inspiration for Travis Bickle of Taxi Driver. [...] The film within this film involves the silly romantic subplot and characters hauled in for comic relief, including the Swedish neighbor Lars Jorgensen (John Qualen), who uses a vaudeville accent, and Mose Harper (Hank Worden), a half-wit treated like a mascot. [...] This second strand is without interest, and those who value The Searchers filter it out, patiently waiting for a return to the main story line."

The Searchers has been cited as one of the greatest films of all time, such as in the BFI's decennial Sight & Sound polls. In 1972, The Searchers was ranked in 18th place. in 1982, it rose to 10th. In 1992, it was ranked in 5th place. In 2012, the film was ranked at 7th place. In 2022, the film was ranked at 15th place in the critic's poll and 72nd place in the director's poll. In a 1959 Cahiers du Cinéma essay, Jean-Luc Godard compared the movie's ending to the reuniting of Odysseus with Telemachus in Homer's Odyssey and wrote:

How can I hate […] John Wayne, who supports Goldwater, and love him tenderly when he suddenly takes Natalie Wood in his arms in the penultimate reel of The Searchers?

In 1963, he ranked The Searchers as the fourth-greatest American movie of the sound era, after Scarface (1932), The Great Dictator (1940), and Vertigo (1958). The 1998 American Film Institute 100 greatest American films list ranked The Searchers in 96th place, and the 2007 iteration of the list ranked it in 12th place. In 1998, TV Guide ranked it 18th. In 2008, the American Film Institute named The Searchers as the greatest Western of all time. In 2010, Richard Corliss noted the film was "now widely regarded as the greatest Western of the 1950s, the genre's greatest decade" and characterized it as a "darkly profound study of obsession, racism, and heroic solitude".

The film currently maintains an 87% rating on the review aggregate website Rotten Tomatoes based on 103 reviews, with an average rating of 9.1/10. The site's critics' consensus reads: "The Searchers is an epic John Wayne Western that introduces dark ambivalence to the genre that remains fashionable today." On Metacritic, the film has a score of 94 out of 100 based on reviews from 15 critics, indicating "universal acclaim".

The film has been recognized multiple times by the American Film Institute:

- AFI's 100 Years...100 Movies – #96
- AFI's 100 Years...100 Movies (10th Anniversary Edition) – #12
- AFI's 10 Top 10 – #1 Western Film

On "They Shoot Pictures Don't They", a site which numerically calculates critical reception for any given film, The Searchers has been recognized as the ninth-most acclaimed movie ever made. Members of the Western Writers of America chose its title song as one of the top 100 Western songs of all time.

Scott McGee stated in 2002, "... more than just making a social statement like other Westerns of the period were apt to do, Ford instills in The Searchers a visual poetry and a sense of melancholy that is rare in American films and rarer still to Westerns."

In 2006, the Writers Guild of America West ranked the film's screenplay 97th in its list of 101 Greatest Screenplays. Glenn Frankel's 2013 study of the film calls it "the greatest Hollywood film that few people have seen".

== Critical interpretations ==
=== Race relations ===
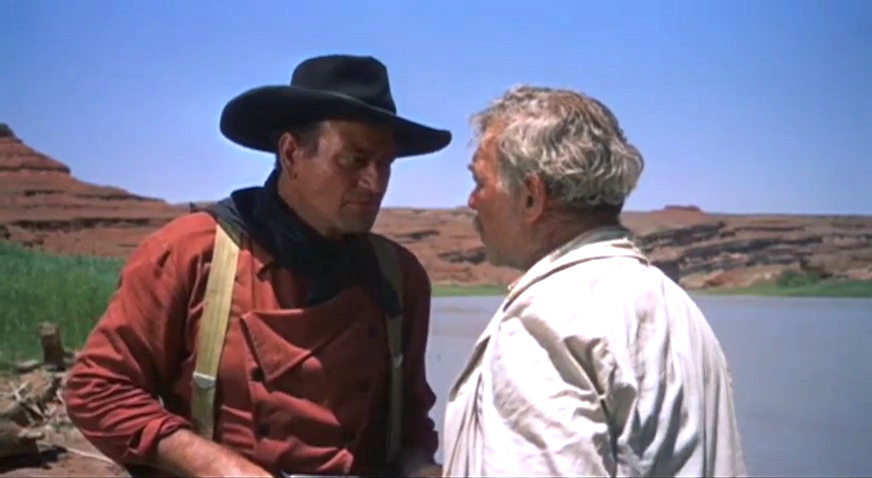
Ethan angrily confronts Clayton after being interrupted while gunning down retreating Native Americans.

A major theme of the film is the historical attitude of white settlers toward Native Americans. Ford was not the first to attempt this examination cinematically, but his depiction of harshness toward Native Americans was startling, particularly to later generations of viewers; Roger Ebert wrote, "I think Ford was trying, imperfectly, even nervously, to depict racism that justified genocide." At the heart of The Searchers is Wayne's performance as the angry, vengeful Ethan Edwards. From the beginning of his quest, he is quite clearly less interested in rescuing Debbie than in wreaking vengeance on the Comanches for the slaughter of his brother's family.

In a 1964 interview with Cosmopolitan, Ford said,

There's some merit to the charge that the Indian hasn't been portrayed accurately or fairly in the Western, but again, this charge has been a broad generalization and often unfair. The Indian didn't welcome the white man ... and he wasn't diplomatic ... If he has been treated unfairly by whites in films, that, unfortunately, was often the case in real life. There was much racial prejudice in the West.

Film scholar Ed Lowry writes, "[W]hile the Comanches are depicted as utterly ruthless, Ford ascribes motivations for their actions, and lends them a dignity befitting a proud civilization. Never do we see the Indians commit atrocities more appalling than those perpetrated by the white man." "Wayne is plainly Ahab", wrote cultural critic Greil Marcus. "He is the good American hero driving himself past all known limits and into madness, his commitment to honor and decency burned down to a core of vengeance." For Brenton Priestley, Ford indicates that Scar's cruelty is also motivated by revenge ("Two sons killed by white men. For each son, I take many... scalps.")

==== Miscegenation ====
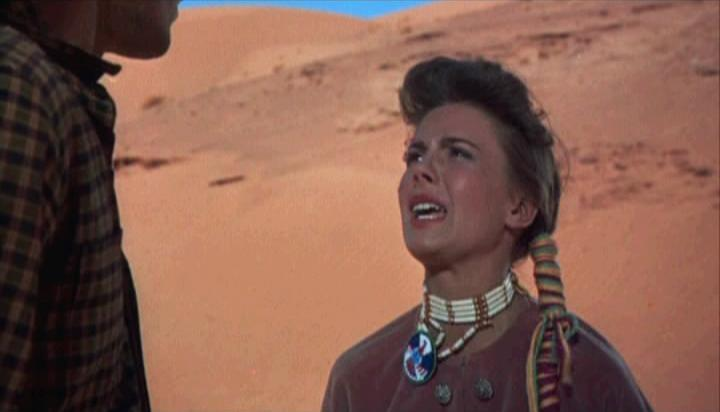
Natalie Wood as Debbie

The theme of miscegenation also runs through the film. Many critical analyses of The Searchers highlight Ethan's view of Debbie as having been "contaminated" through her abduction and implied rape.

The rape of captive white women by the Comanche is an unspoken theme. No actual rape scene is depicted, but Alexandra Heller-Nicholas in her study of Rape-Revenge Films says, "the abduction, captivity, and implied rape of Debbie (Natalie Wood) ... drives the narrative"; and Edward Buscombe points out a scene in which "[Ethan] turns off the trail to penetrate a narrow crevice in the rocks, and when he emerges, his savage stabbing with his knife seems to mimic a violent sexual act, drawing us 'a picture' of the act of rape which obsesses him." Glenn Frankel writes that in real life, "Rape was a fact of life for many captives, although it was seldom discussed by those women who escaped or were ransomed back to the white world."

Early on, Martin earns a sour look from Ethan when he admits to being one-eighth Cherokee. Ethan says repeatedly that he will kill his niece rather than have her live "with a buck", that "living with the Comanche ain't living". Even one of the film's gentler characters, Vera Miles's Laurie, tells Martin when he explains he must protect his adoptive sister, "Ethan will put a bullet in her brain. I tell you Martha would want him to." This outburst makes it clear that even the supposedly gentler characters hold the same fear of miscegenation.

Randy Roberts and James Olson write that Ethan Edwards

is also an obsessed maniac. White settlers are not simply the advanced vanguard of civilization; they are racists. Indians are not just noble savages; they are savage killers. The frontier is not a place of opportunity; it is a wasteland. ... In the character of Ethan Edwards, John Wayne had extended the Western hero to the border of evil.

=== Ethan and Martha ===
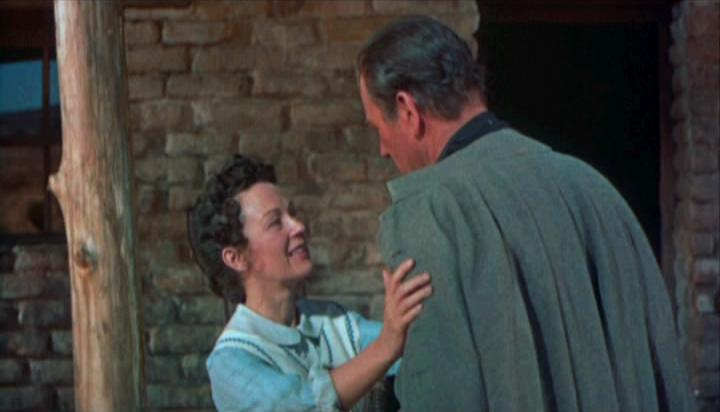
The unspoken love between Wayne's Ethan and his brother's wife Martha and his obsession with avenging her drive the film.

An important plot undercurrent is the obvious mutual attraction between Ethan Edwards and his brother's wife, Martha. Although no dialogue alludes to it, many visual references to their relationship are seen throughout the film. Some critics have suggested that this unspoken passion implies that Debbie—who is specifically described as eight years old, as Ethan returns from an eight-year absence—may be Ethan's daughter. Such a situation would add further layers of nuance to Ethan's obsessive search for Debbie, his revulsion at the thought that she might be living as a Native American, and his ultimate decision to bring her home—and then walk away. Beyond the ostensible motivations, it might depict a guilt-ridden father's need to save the daughter he made by cuckolding his brother, then abandoned.

== Influence ==
The Searchers has influenced many films. David Lean watched the film repeatedly while preparing for Lawrence of Arabia to help him get a sense of how to shoot a landscape. The entrance of Ethan Edwards in The Searchers, across a vast prairie, is echoed in the across-the-desert entrance of Sherif Ali in Lawrence of Arabia. Sam Peckinpah referenced the aftermath of the massacre and the funeral scene in Major Dundee (1965), and according to a 1974 review by Jay Cocks, Peckinpah's Bring Me the Head of Alfredo Garcia contains dialogue with "direct tributes to such classics as John Huston's The Treasure of the Sierra Madre and John Ford's The Searchers."

Martin Scorsese's 1967 film Who's That Knocking at My Door features a sequence in which the two primary characters discuss The Searchers, and in his 1973 film Mean Streets, three characters attend a screening of The Searchers. In 2012, in a Sight & Sound poll, Scorsese listed The Searchers as one of his all-time favorite films.

Scott McGee, writing for Turner Classic Movies, notes "Steven Spielberg, Martin Scorsese, John Milius, Paul Schrader, Wim Wenders, Jean-Luc Godard, and George Lucas have all been influenced and paid some form of homage to The Searchers in their work." Wenders' Palme d'Or-winning 1984 film Paris, Texas in particular has been cited for similarities.

The film influenced several aspects of George Lucas' film saga Star Wars. The scene in which Ethan Edwards discovers the flaming wreckage of his family homestead is reflected in 1977's Star Wars, wherein the character Luke Skywalker finds that his homestead has been burned and destroyed by Imperial Stormtroopers. The Searchers was also an influence on the 2002 prequel film in the series, Star Wars: Episode II – Attack of the Clones. In the film, Anakin Skywalker learns that one of his family members has been abducted by a group of Tusken Raiders (though the character's mother is kidnapped, rather than a niece). Anakin massacres the kidnappers in vengeance, much like The Searchers' climactic battle in the Comanche camp. The opening scenes of Rogue One mirror those of The Searchers: the pig-tailed character of Jyn is hidden by her parents when their homestead is attacked in the same way little Debbie is saved by her parents when they are attacked by the Comanches.

Douglas Gordon's 1995 artwork, 5 Year Drive-By, stretches out The Searchers from the original 119-minute runtime to five years (reflecting the events of the movie taking place over a timespan of five years), playing at a speed of one frame every 24 minutes.

The 2007 film Searchers 2.0 by Alex Cox includes many discussions of The Searchers as well as other revenge films. In the film, the characters attend a screening of a remake of The Searchers directed by Ted Post and starring James Mitchum as Ethan Edwards and Telly Savalas as Chief Cicatriz (Scar), though no such remake was ever made in reality (Ted Post had actually directed a remake of John Ford's Stagecoach).

Breaking Bad creator Vince Gilligan stated that the ending to the show's final episode, "Felina", was influenced by the film.

The 2016 Canadian film Searchers is a partial remake of the film, in which an Inuk man in 1913 finds his wife and daughter have been kidnapped. However, co-director Zacharias Kunuk discarded the original's plot about conflicts between white people and indigenous peoples, instead using only Inuit characters. Kunuk explained racism was not an intended theme of his film. Kunuk said he watched Western films in the Igloolik community hall as a boy, and declared The Searchers star John Wayne "was our hero".

John Wayne's repeatedly used line "that'll be the day" inspired Buddy Holly to write the song "That'll Be the Day" after seeing the film in a theater in Lubbock, Texas.

The title of the novel The Searcher by Tana French is an allusion to the film.

== Home media ==
The Searchers was first released on home video on VHS and Betamax in 1980, followed by releases on LaserDisc in 1984 and DVD in 1997. It was released by the Warner Archive Collection on Blu-ray, HD DVD and a remastered DVD in 2006 for the film's 50th anniversary. The film was released on Ultra HD Blu-ray and a remastered Blu-ray on December 17, 2024, by the Warner Archive Collection as the label's first 4K release, featuring a remaster from its original VistaVision camera negative.

== Comic book adaptation ==
- Dell Comics published an adaptation of The Searchers in Dell Four Color #709 (June 1956), written by Leo Dorfman and drawn by Mike Roy. The comic book downplays Ethan's racism and omits the final iconic scene of the film.

== See also ==
- John Ford filmography
- John Wayne filmography
- List of American films of 1956
- List of cult films
- List of films voted the best

== Bibliography ==
- Alvis, J. David; Alvis, John E. (2009). "Heroic Virtue and the Limits of Democracy in John Ford's The Searchers". Perspectives on Political Science. 38 (2): 69–78. doi:10.3200/PPSC.38.2.69-78. S2CID 144615334.
- Clauss, James J. (1999). "Descent into Hell: Mythic Paradigms in The Searchers". Journal of Popular Film and Television. 27 (3): 2–17. doi:10.1080/01956059909602804.
- Cohen, Hubert I. (2010). "Red River and The Searchers: Deception in the Modern Western". Film Criticism. 35 (1): 82–102. JSTOR 44019396.
- Day, Kirsten (2008). "'What Makes a Man to Wander?': The Searchers as a Western Odyssey". Arethusa. 41 (1): 11–49. doi:10.1353/are.2008.0010. S2CID 162446780.
- Day, Kirsten. (2016). Cowboy Classics: The Roots of the American Western in the Epic Tradition. Edinburgh University Press. ISBN 978-1-4744-0246-0.
- Eckstein, Arthur M. (1998). "Darkening Ethan: John Ford's The Searchers (1956) from Novel to Screenplay to Screen" (PDF). Cinema Journal. 38 (1): 3–24. doi:10.2307/1225733. JSTOR 1225733.
- Eckstein, Arthur M.; Lehman, Peter, eds. (2004). The Searchers: Essays and Reflections on John Ford's Classic Western. Wayne State University Press.
- Frankel, Glenn (2013). The Searchers: The Making of an American Legend. New York: Bloomsbury. ISBN 978-1-60819-105-5. Excerpt and text search.
- Freedman, Jonathan (2000). "The Affect of the Market: Economic and Racial Exchange in The Searchers". American Literary History. 12 (3): 585–599. doi:10.1093/alh/12.3.585. JSTOR 490222. S2CID 144193286.
- Pippin, Robert B. (2012). Hollywood Westerns and American Myth: The Importance of Howard Hawks and John Ford for Political Philosophy. Yale University Press. ISBN 978-0-300-17206-5.

=== Primary sources ===
- The Searchers: Screenplay, by Frank S Nugent, Alan Le May, John Ford. Published by Warner Bros, 1956.
