= The Keeper (novel) =

2026 novel by Irish-American author Tana French

- Author: Tana French
- Audio read by: Roger Clark
- Language: English
- Series: Cal Hooper
- Genre: Mystery, thriller
- Publisher: Viking
- Publication date: March 31, 2026
- Media type: Print (hardcover), audiobook, ebook
- Pages: 496 (US hardcover)
- ISBN: 978-0-593-49346-5
- Preceded by: The Hunter

The Keeper is a 2026 novel by Irish-American author Tana French. It is the third and final book in her Cal Hooper trilogy, following The Searcher (2020) and The Hunter (2024). The novel was published in the United States by Viking on March 31, 2026, and in the United Kingdom by Penguin / Viking on April 2, 2026.

== Plot ==
The novel is set in Ardnakelty, a fictional farming village in western Ireland. Cal Hooper, a retired Chicago police detective in his early fifties, has lived in Ardnakelty for five years and has become partially integrated into the community. He is engaged to Lena Dunne, a local widow, and works as a woodworker with Trey Reddy, a teenager who has become a surrogate daughter to him. On a cold night, Rachel Holohan, a 19-year-old woman engaged to Eugene Moynihan (the son of Tommy Moynihan, a wealthy meat-processor and the village's most powerful figure), goes missing and is later found dead in the river. Initial suspicion falls on suicide, but Rachel had visited Lena's house on the night of her death, distressed and seeking advice about Tommy Moynihan's plans for the village. Lena feels guilty for having missed warning signs, and Trey convinces Cal to investigate.

Cal's discreet inquiries into Rachel's life and the Moynihan family's land acquisitions ignite a dangerous feud. Tommy Moynihan has been buying large tracts of local farmland for a development project that threatens to transform the village. As Cal and Lena pursue answers separately Cal through the network of local farmers and pub conversations, Lena through her sister Noreen (the village shopkeeper) and a reunion with former school friends tensions rise. The two approaches place strain on their relationship. The novel is narrated through alternating interior monologues of Cal and Lena. The death investigation and the land-development scheme converge as the village is split between those loyal to the Moynihans and those opposed to them. The novel concludes with a confrontation that resolves both plotlines.

== Background ==
French has said that the Cal Hooper trilogy was influenced by Western fiction. She described reading Westerns and realizing that "an awful lot of the tropes of Western fiction map really nicely onto the West of Ireland"—the harsh terrain, the distance from power brokers, and the necessity of making and enforcing local rules. The character of Cal Hooper, an American outsider, serves as what French calls "the stranger who blows into town" and acts as a catalyst for change.

French, who was born in Vermont and grew up in multiple countries before settling in Dublin, has described the outsider perspective as central to her interest. "I'm what they call a third-culture kid, which means I'm not really from anywhere," she said. "Every place you go to, you're new, and you have to come to it with an outsider's eye." In pre-publication materials, French acknowledged the limitations of the small-town setting: "There's a limit to how many sinister deaths you can have in one small townland before you go full 'Murder, She Wrote.'"

== Publication ==
The Keeper was published in the United States by Viking (an imprint of Penguin Random House) on March 31, 2026. The UK edition was published by Penguin / Viking on April 2, 2026. The first US hardcover edition is 496 pages; the UK edition is 528 pages. The audiobook, narrated by Roger Clark, was released simultaneously and runs 19 hours and 45 minutes. A large print edition was published by Random House Large Print. The novel was named a Most Anticipated Book of 2026 by The New York Times, The Washington Post, Time, Oprah Daily, Today, BookPage, and Goodreads.

== Critical response ==
The Washington Independent Review of Books called the novel "a superb, genre-defying conclusion to the author's Cal Hooper trilogy" and described it as "imbued start to finish with a mesmerizing sense of place and an unerring instinct for capturing not just character and personality but a spot-on feel for the authentic cadence of spoken language." NPR wrote that The Keeper "solidifies [the] series' status as a contemporary classic" and praised French as "an exquisite nature writer on par with the likes of Norman Maclean and Annie Dillard."

The Guardian, in a review roundup, described the novel as "an immersive, slow-burn of a book, as much about the march of time and the inevitably changing nature of Irish rural life as it is about solving a crime" and called it "dense, compelling and superbly atmospheric." The New York Times Book Review noted that while the Cal Hooper books are "slower-paced and more interior than conventional mysteries," they "grow on you" and praised French as "one of the most consistently exciting mystery writers around."

The Chicago Tribune wrote that The Keeper "works as a satisfying conclusion to the trilogy" while also showing "clear signs that French is making the right call to move on from Hooper and Ardnakelty."
