= Secret Place =

"Secret Place" may refer to:

- Secret Place (album), an album by Neal Morse
- A Secret Place, a 1976 album by Grover Washington, Jr
- "Secret Place", a song by Trish Thuy Trang
- "A Secret Place", a song from the 1997 Megadeth album Cryptic Writings
- The Secret Place (film), a 1957 British crime film
- "The Secret Place" (short story), a 1966 short story by Richard McKenna
- Secret Place, a episodes on WVCY-TV
- The Secret Place (book), a 2014 novel by Tana French

== See also ==
- Secret Places, a 1984 British drama film
