= The Trespasser (Tana French novel) =

Book by Tana French

- Author: Tana French
- Language: English
- Series: Dublin Murder Squad #6
- Genre: Mystery
- Publisher: Viking Penguin
- Publication date: 2016
- Publication place: Ireland
- Media type: Print (hardcover)
- ISBN: 978-1-444-75562-6

The Trespasser is a 2016 novel by Tana French set in Ireland.

== Plot summary ==
Detective Antoinette Conway and her partner Stephen Moran are assigned to what appears to be a straightforward murder case. Yet from the very beginning, small inconsistencies and uneasy tensions suggest that the investigation may not be as simple as it seems. As they dig deeper, the pair navigate conflicting narratives, workplace pressures, and an atmosphere thick with suspicion. Conway, already feeling like an outsider among her colleagues, finds herself confronting questions of trust, perception, and hidden motives.

== Continuity ==
Several characters in The Secret Place appeared in previous novels by this author; these including Stephen Moran (Faithful Place and The Secret Place) and Antoinette Conway (Faithful Place and The Secret Place).

== Critical reception ==
The book received favorable reviews in prominent publications.

The Guardian praised the novel as a smart, intricately plotted crime story with richly layered characters. The review particularly highlighted the tense, serpentine interrogation scenes reminiscent of John le Carré and commended Tana French's sharp, atmospheric narrative voice.

The New Yorker framed the novel within Tana French's broader exploration of crime as a social and psychological inquiry, praising the series’ consuming quality and its vivid portrait of contemporary Ireland. The review emphasized French's deeper preoccupation with identity—where the central mystery becomes not only who committed the crime, but who the detective truly is.
