= The Likeness =

Book by Tana French

- Author: Tana French
- Language: English
- Series: Dublin Murder Squad
- Genre: Mystery
- Publisher: Viking Penguin
- Publication date: 17 July 2008
- Publication place: Ireland
- Media type: Print (paperback)
- Pages: 466
- ISBN: 978-0143115625
- Dewey Decimal: 823/.92 22
- Followed by: Faithful Place

The Likeness is a 2008 mystery novel by Tana French. Set in Ireland, it is the second volume in French's Dublin Murder Squad series. The Likeness and In the Woods, the first book of the series, are the inspiration for the BBC and Starz's 2019 Dublin Murders, an eight-episode series.

== Plot summary ==
The story follows the efforts of detective Cassie Maddox to determine the circumstances surrounding the death of Lexie Madison, a young woman who is her doppelgänger. The dead woman not only resembles Cassie but also was living under an alias the detective used in an earlier undercover assignment. A senior police officer, Frank Mackey, convinces Cassie to impersonate the dead woman to investigate her death and to discover who she really was.

As the investigation proceeds, Cassie becomes consumed by her impersonation of the murder victim. She forms deep bonds with the dead girl’s four housemates, who are suspects in the murder. Boundaries begin to blur between Cassie's real and undercover identities.

== Continuity ==
Cassie Maddox was a character in French's 2007 In the Woods. Her partner in In the Woods, Adam "Rob" Ryan, is mentioned briefly in The Likeness. Frank Mackey appears in French's later novels Faithful Place (2010) and The Secret Place (2014).

== Critical reception ==
In 2009 the book was shortlisted for the first annual Ireland AM Crime Fiction Award.

The Irish Independent praised the "elegance and insight" of French's writing and described the book as "a brilliant thriller, beautifully written." Laura Miller of Salon.com included the book among the ten on the Salon Book Awards 2008, writing that "The hypnotic prose and eerie atmosphere conspire to make this ostensible mystery novel much, much more than it appears to be." In a more critical vein, Janet Maslin of The New York Times commented that French "could have achieved the same effects much more succinctly in a more tightly edited version of this same story. But Cassie herself remains a strong enough character to sustain interest."
