= The Long and Faraway Gone =

2015 mystery novel by Lou Berney

- Author: Lou Berney
- Genre: Mystery, Crime, Thriller
- Published: 2015
- Publisher: William Morrow
- Pages: 454
- Awards: Macavity Award for Best Mystery (2016); Anthony Award for Best Paperback Original (2016); Edgar Award for Best Paperback Original (2016)
- ISBN: 978-0-062-29243-8
- Website: The Long and Faraway Gone

The Long and Faraway Gone is a novel written by American author Lou Berney, first published by William Morrow on February 10, 2015. It later went on to win 3 literary awards.

== Awards ==
- Macavity Award for Best Mystery (2016)
- Anthony Award for Best Paperback Original (2016)
- Edgar Award for Best Paperback Original (2016)
- Finalist: Los Angeles Times Book Prize for Mystery/Thriller
