= The Hunter (Tana French novel) =

2024 mystery novel by Tana French

- Author: Tana French
- Genre: mystery, thriller, western
- Publisher: Viking Press
- Publication date: March 5, 2024
- ISBN: 978-0-593-49343-4
- Preceded by: The Searcher
- Followed by: The Keeper

The Hunter is a mystery novel by American-Irish writer Tana French. It was published by Viking Press on March 5, 2024. It is the sequel to The Searcher (2020) and the second novel in French's Cal Hooper series. The plot returns to former Chicago police officer Cal Hooper in the rural village of Ardnakelty in Western Ireland, where the reappearance of a local teenager's absent father threatens the life he has built.

== Plot ==
Two years after the events of The Searcher, Cal Hooper, a retired Chicago police detective, has settled into life in Ardnakelty, a small village in the west of Ireland. He has begun a relationship with a local woman, Lena, and mentors teenager Trey Reddy, teaching her carpentry and furniture restoration.

Trey's long-absent father, Johnny Reddy, returns to Ardnakelty accompanied by a wealthy Englishman and promotes a scheme claiming there is gold in the surrounding land, drawing in the local men. Still grieving the death of her brother Brendan, Trey sees the situation as an opportunity for revenge against the community. When a man is found dead, a Garda detective arrives from Dublin to investigate, and Cal and Lena try to protect Trey as the scheme unravels.

== Background ==
The Hunter is French's ninth novel and a sequel to her 2020 "Irish western" The Searcher. French has described the book as a story about revenge in its various forms and about families, "both the ones we're born with and the ones we forge for ourselves," and noted that it retains western elements ranging from revenge to a small-scale gold rush. The novel is the second in a trilogy of Cal Hooper novels; the third, The Keeper, was published in 2026.

The Searcher was originally intended to be a standalone novel, but after the COVID-19 pandemic, French decided to revisit the world of The Searcher.

== Reception ==
The Hunter was an instant New York Times bestseller and was named a Best Thriller Novel of 2024 by The New York Times.

Writing for The Washington Post, Maureen Corrigan described the novel as a slow-burn suspense story and called it extraordinary, praising the small, accumulating details that build its tension. In The Guardian, Stephanie Merritt called French "a master of her craft," writing that she builds on the complex relationships and moral ambiguities of The Searcher and ratchets up tension in increments.

The New York Times praised the novel, but stated that the pacing lagged at times and that Cal "sometimes feels more like an avatar than a fully fleshed-out character." Writing for the Associated Press, Bruce DeSilva described it as "a suspenseful tale of revenge, justice, friendship and loyalty in collision, and of a young girl who must decide which conflicting values matter most."

In 2025, The Hunter was shortlisted for the Crime Writers' Association's Gold Dagger award for the best crime novel of the year.
