= Dry Bones in the Valley =

Book by Tom Bouman

- First edition
- Author: Tom Bouman
- Genre: Mystery fiction, Thriller, Crime
- Published: 2014
- Publisher: W. W. Norton & Company (US); Faber and Faber (UK)
- Pages: 288
- Awards: Edgar Award for Best First Novel (2015)
- ISBN: 978-0-393-35078-4
- Website: Dry Bones in the Valley

Dry Bones in the Valley (ISBN 978-0-393-35078-4) is a book written by Tom Bouman and was originally published by W. W. Norton & Company.

== Awards ==
- Edgar Award for Best First Novel in 2015
- Los Angeles Times Book Prize for Mystery/Thriller IN 2014
