= The Witch Elm =

Novel by Tana French

- First edition
- Author: Tana French
- Publisher: Viking Press
- Publication date: 9 October 2018
- Pages: 509

The Witch Elm (also published as The Wych Elm) is a 2018 novel by Tana French. The novel is a standalone, not related to her Dublin Murder Squad novels.

== Plot ==
Toby Hennessey, an art gallery public relations executive who begins the story believing he has lived a charmed life, receives life-changing injuries, including brain trauma, during a burglary at his Dublin flat. After he is discharged from hospital, and on learning that his uncle, Hugo, has an inoperable brain tumour, Toby and his girlfriend, Melissa, move in with Hugo to look after him. Hugo’s townhouse, the Ivy House, is a place where Toby spent much of his youth, along with his cousins, Leon and Susanna, and their circle of friends.

During a family gathering, Toby's niece and nephew discover a human skull in an old wych elm tree at the bottom of the garden. Garda detectives find the rest of a body, which is identified as that of Dominic Ganley, a teenage friend of Toby’s who disappeared ten years earlier. Evidence suggests Dominic was murdered, and Toby becomes a suspect, but because of memory loss, he cannot clearly recall the events from the summer Dominic disappeared. Toby begins to suspect Leon after learning Dominic had bullied him because of his homosexuality, and tries to get answers from Leon and Susanna. Toby's relationship with Melissa is damaged in the process as she begins to wonder if he killed Dominic, and she leaves him.

When suspicion appears to fall further on Toby, Hugo confesses to the murder, and dies in hospital after being taken into police custody. Susanna and Leon then reveal to Toby that they both killed Dominic following Dominic's continued sexual harassment of Susanna. Detective Mike Rafferty, one of the officers who arrested Hugo, does not believe Hugo’s confession and goes to the Ivy House to talk to Toby. A fight ensues between the two after Rafferty tells Toby his mental incapacity would make it easier to secure a murder conviction against him. Rafferty dies after his head strikes a stone during the altercation. In court, Toby successfully argues that he fought with Rafferty after mistaking him as an intruder, and evidence is provided that he was experiencing post-traumatic stress disorder because of the burglary at his flat. He is convicted of manslaughter by diminished responsibility and sentenced to time in the Central Mental Hospital. The Ivy House is sold to pay for Toby’s legal defence, and the story ends with his release from custody.

== Writing and development ==
French was motivated to write the novel as an exploration of the connection between luck and an individual's ability to feel empathy for others. French was also inspired by Bella in the Wych Elm, an unidentified woman found in a wych elm in Hagley in the 1940s. French does not find true crime any more recent than the Bella case interesting, partially due to the ongoing impacts on living people caused by more recent crimes. To accurately depict the protagonist's experience after a traumatic event, French conducted research about PTSD.

French was also motivated to write the novel due to an interest in exploring a crime from a perspective other than that of a detective, the primary viewpoint used in her Dublin Murder Squad novels.

== Reception ==
American author Stephen King, in a review written for The New York Times, praised the novel as "extraordinary".
