= Lou Berney =

American crime fiction author

- Born: 1964 (age 61–62); Oklahoma City, Oklahoma, U.S.
- Occupations: crime fiction author, screenwriter
- Notable work: The Long and Faraway Gone

Lou Berney (born 1964) is an American crime fiction author since 1991. His works have won three Barry and two Anthony Awards. Berney has also received the CWA Ian Fleming Steel Dagger twice and an Edgar Award. Apart from literature, Berney was a screenwriter for Angels Sing. He has also taught at the University of Oklahoma and Oklahoma City University.

== Early life and education ==
Berney was born in Oklahoma City, Oklahoma in 1964. While living with siblings as a child, Berney liked the stories his father told. He was dismissed from several jobs as a teenager, which included positions in photography and property maintenance. Berney worked for a student newspaper as a writer. For his post-secondary education, Berney went to Loyola University New Orleans for a journalism program before he graduated with a Master of Fine Arts from the University of Massachusetts Amherst.

== Career ==
During 1989, The New Yorker published Berney's short story titled News of the World. In 1991, Berney released The Road to Bobby Joe and Other Stories. During the 1990s, Berney completed two unpublished books before he became a screenwriter. During the 2007–2008 Writers Guild of America strike, Berney took three months to write a screenplay called Gutshot Straight. Berney planned to turn Gutshot Straight into a movie before publishing his work as a book in 2010. His written film, Angels Sing, was released to theaters in 2013.

Following Gutshot Straight, Berney released Whiplash River in 2012 as a followup book for his Shake Bouchon series. His last Bouchon book, Double Barrel Bluff, was not released during the scheduled 2020 release. The book was released during 2024.

Outside of series, additional books published by Berney were The Long and Faraway Gone in 2015 and November Road in 2018. That year, November Road was planned for a movie adaptation when Lawrence Kasdan bought the book's film rights. During 2020, Berney abandoned an unfinished book he started in the late 2010s. Dark Ride was released by Berney in 2023. Crooks: A Novel About Crime and Family was published during 2025.

Apart from his works, Berney was a writing teacher throughout the 2000s. In 2011, Berney began teaching creative writing for Oklahoma City University. His Oklahoma City tenure continued leading up to the 2020s. He also taught at the University of Oklahoma during the 2010s.

== Writing process and themes ==
At the beginning of his writing, Berney "[does] a lot of jotting down of random ideas [and] possible threads". He focuses on creating the backgrounds of people before moving on to the book's events. Microsoft Word and Scrivener are used by Berney to create his books. For his Shake Bouchon books, Berney chose Panama, Egypt and Cambodia as locations. While listing authors that made up his career, Berney said Elmore Leonard was "a huge influence."

For The Long and Faraway Gone, Berney thought about using the Oklahoma City bombing before choosing different events that occurred in Oklahoma City. Berney based his book on murders that occurred at a Sirloin Stockade during the late 1970s and the disappearances of two children at the Oklahoma State Fair during the early 1980s. With November Road, Berney based his book on the conspiracy theory that the New Orleans crime family were behind the assassination of John F. Kennedy. Berney intended to have the main characters meet each other in a town before he decided to have them meet during their individual travels.

== Awards and nominations ==
=== Awards ===
- Paramount Pictures fellowship
- 2016 Anthony Award for Best Paperback Original – The Long and Faraway Gone
- 2016 Barry Award for Best Paperback Original – The Long and Faraway Gone
- 2016 Edgar Award for Best Paperback Original – The Long and Faraway Gone
- 2016 Macavity Award for Best Mystery Novel – The Long and Faraway Gone
- 2016 Oklahoma Book Awards for Fiction – The Long and Faraway Gone
- 2019 Anthony Award for Best Novel – November Road
- 2019 Barry Award for Best Mystery/Crime Novel – November Road
- 2019 Hammett Award – November Road
- 2019 Macavity Award for Best Novel – November Road
- 2019 Oklahoma Book Awards for Fiction – November Road
- 2020 CWA Ian Fleming Steel Dagger – November Road
- 2025 Barry Award for Best Paperback Original Mystery Novel – Double Barrel Bluff
- 2025 CWA Ian Fleming Steel Dagger – Dark Ride
- 2026 Macavity Award for Best Mystery Novel – Crooks

=== Nominations ===
- 2011 Barry Award for Best First Mystery/Crime Novel – Gutshot Straight
- 2013 Anthony Award for Best Paperback Original – Whiplash River
- 2013 Edgar Award for Best Paperback Original – Whiplash River
- 2016 Los Angeles Times Book Prize for Mystery/Thriller – The Long and Faraway Gone
- 2017 Dublin Literary Award – The Long and Faraway Gone
- 2019 Los Angeles Times Book Prize for Mystery/Thriller – November Road
- 2020 Barry Award for Best Mystery/Crime Novel of the Decade – November Road
- 2020 Gold Dagger – November Road
- 2024 Barry Award for Best Mystery or Crime Novel – Dark Ride
- 2024 Los Angeles Times Book Prize for Mystery/Thriller – Dark Ride
- 2024 Macavity Award for Best Mystery Novel – Dark Ride
- 2024 Oklahoma Book Awards for Fiction – Dark Ride
- 2025 Dublin Literary Award – Dark Ride
- 2026 Los Angeles Times Book Prize for Mystery/Thriller – Crooks
