= Dublin Murders =

Television series based on the Dublin Murder Squad novels

- Genre: Crime drama
- Created by: Sarah Phelps
- Based on: In the Woods & The Likeness by Tana French
- Screenplay by: Sarah Phelps
- Directed by: Saul Dibb; John Hayes; Rebecca Gatward
- Starring: Killian Scott; Sarah Greene; Tom Vaughan-Lawlor; Moe Dunford; Sam Keeley; Antonio Aakeel
- Theme music composer: Volker Bertelmann
- Country of origin: Ireland
- Original language: English
- No. of series: 1
- No. of episodes: 8

Production
- Executive producers: Sarah Phelps; Kate Harwood; Noemi Spanos; Ed Guiney; Alan Gasmer; Peter Jaysen; Elizabeth Kilgariff; Saul Dibb; Tommy Bulfin
- Producer: Carmel Maloney
- Running time: 60 minutes
- Production companies: Euston Films; Veritas Entertainment Group; Element Pictures

Original release
- Network: BBC One (UK); RTÉ (Ireland)
- Release: 14 October – 5 November 2019

Dublin Murders is a crime drama television series created by Sarah Phelps. It is based on the Dublin Murder Squad books by Tana French, commissioned by the BBC for BBC One and Starz, with RTÉ later joining the project. The first series, consisting of eight episodes, is adapted from In the Woods (2007) and The Likeness (2008).

The series premiered on BBC One on 14 October 2019, on RTÉ One on 16 October 2019, and on Starz on 10 November 2019.

== Cast and characters ==
=== Main ===
- Killian Scott as Rob Reilly
- Sarah Greene as Cassie Maddox
- Michael D'Arcy as Adam Reilly
- Tom Vaughan-Lawlor as Frank Mackey
- Eugene O'Hare as (Det.) Quigley
- Moe Dunford as Sam O'Neill
- Ellie O'Halloran as Jamie Rowan
- Niall Jordan as Peter Savage
- Ian Kenny as (Gda.) Phelan

=== Recurring ===
- Conleth Hill as (Superintendent) O'Kelly
- Peter McDonald as Jonathan Devlin
- Amy Macken as Katy and Jessica Devlin
- Leah McNamara as Rosalind Devlin
- Jonny Holden as Damien Donnelly
- Sam Keeley as Daniel March
- Antonio Aakeel as Raphael "Rafe" Hyland
- Charlie Kelly as Justin Mannering
- Vanessa Emme as Abigail "Abby" Stone
- Carolyn Bracken as Sandra Sculley
- Alexandra Moen as Simone Cameron
- Kathy Monahan as Margaret Devlin
- Ericka Roe as Alannah Shorey
- Florence Ordesh as Mel Royce
- Ned Dennehy as pathologist

== Production ==
=== Development ===
Dublin Murders was commissioned by British public service broadcaster BBC for BBC One, and Starz, with Irish public service broadcaster RTÉ later joining the project. Produced by Euston Films, a part of the Fremantle Media group, FremantleMedia International handles international rights. Sarah Phelps wrote the screenplay which is based on In the Woods and The Likeness, two books written by Tana French. Carmel Maloney produced the series. Sarah Phelps, Kate Harwood, Noemi Spanos, Ed Guiney, Alan Gasmer, Peter Jaysen, Elizabeth Kilgariff, Saul Dibb and Tommy Bulfin are executive producers.

In January 2020, it was reported that Starz was in talks for a second series.

=== Filming ===
Filming commenced in 2018 in Belfast and Dublin and continued in Dublin to late February 2019.

== Episodes ==
No.	Episode	Directed by	Written by	Original UK air date	Original US air date	UK viewers (millions)
1	Episode 1	Saul Dibb	Sarah Phelps	14 October 2019	10 November 2019	6.01
2	Episode 2	Saul Dibb	Sarah Phelps	15 October 2019	17 November 2019	5.01
3	Episode 3	John Hayes	Sarah Phelps	21 October 2019	24 November 2019	4.74
4	Episode 4	John Hayes	Sarah Phelps	22 October 2019	1 December 2019	N/A (<4.59) (Note: Not reported in the weekly top 15 programmes for four-screen viewer ratings.)
5	Episode 5	Rebecca Gatward	Sarah Phelps	28 October 2019	8 December 2019	N/A (<4.72)
6	Episode 6	Rebecca Gatward	Chandni Lakhani	29 October 2019	15 December 2019	N/A (<4.72)
7	Episode 7	John Hayes	Sarah Phelps	4 November 2019	22 December 2019	4.63
8	Episode 8	John Hayes	Sarah Phelps	5 November 2019	29 December 2019	4.58

== Broadcast ==
The series consists of eight episodes, and was also acquired by Starz for airing in the US and Canada, while StarzPlay holds broadcasting rights for Germany, France, Italy, Spain and Brazil. Dublin Murders debuted on BBC One on 14 October 2019, on RTÉ One on 16 October 2019, and on Starz on 10 November 2019. The series ended in the UK with episode 8, broadcast on 5 November 2019, watched by 4.58 million UK viewers.
