= Tom Bouman =

American author

Tom Bouman is an American author, editor and musician.

== Personal life ==
He studied law in Pennsylvania. In 2016, he joined Aspen Words as writer in residence. He lives with his wife and two daughters in Upstate New York.

== Selected publications ==
- Dry Bones in the Valley
- Fateful Mornings: A Henry Farrell Novel
- The Bramble and the Rose

== Awards ==
- Los Angeles Times Book Prize for Mystery/Thriller in 2014 for Dry Bones in the Valley
- Edgar Award for Best First Novel in 2015 for Dry Bones in the Valley
- Shortlisted for Macavity Award for Best First Mystery Novel in 2015 for Dry Bones in the Valley

== Critical reception ==
Michael Sims of The Washington Post judged it "exciting debut thriller" and Marilyn Stasio of The New York Times called it "beautiful novel".
