= Tana French =

Irish writer and actress (born 1973)

- Tana French at Bloody Scotland 2026
- Born: Tana Elizabeth French; May 10, 1973 (age 53); Burlington, Vermont, United States
- Education: Trinity College Dublin
- Occupations: Writer and actress
- Children: 2
- Website: tanafrench.com

Tana French (born 10 May 1973) is an Irish writer and theatrical actress. She is a resident of Dublin, Ireland. Her debut novel In the Woods (2007), a psychological mystery, won the Edgar, Anthony, Macavity, and Barry awards for best first novel. The Independent has called her "the First Lady of Irish Crime".

== Personal life ==
Tana Elizabeth French was born in Burlington, Vermont, United States, to Elena Hvostoff-Lombardi and David French. Her father was an economist who worked on resource management for the developing world, and she lived in numerous countries as a child, including Ireland, Italy, the United States and Malawi.

French attended Trinity College Dublin, and trained in acting. She settled in Ireland and has lived in Dublin since 1990. French and her husband have two daughters.

== Works ==
French was enthralled by both acting and writing since her childhood but eventually focused more on acting. She grew up reading mystery and crime novels. She trained as a professional actor at Trinity, and she works in theatre, film, and voiceover.

In her early 30s, she wrote her debut novel in the months-long lulls between castings; In the Woods was published in 2007 to positive reviews. Publishers Weekly praised French, saying she "expertly walks the line between police procedural and psychological thriller in her debut" and that "Ryan and Maddox are empathetic and flawed heroes, whose partnership and friendship elevate the narrative beyond a gory tale of murdered children and repressed childhood trauma." In 2014, Flavorwire included it in their 50 of the Greatest Debut Novels Since 1950. As of 2015 more than one million copies of In the Woods have been sold.

The second novel, The Likeness (2008), presents the story of the first novel's co-lead, Cassie Maddox. It stayed on The New York Times Best Seller list for several months. In its reviews of the novel, Kirkus praised its mix of "police procedures, psychological thrills and gothic romance beautifully woven into one stunning story". French stated that Donna Tartt's The Secret History was an influence on The Likeness, opening up the "landscape of friendship as something worthy of exploration and something that could be powerful enough to trigger a murder."

French's first six novels form the “Dublin Murder Squad” series. This series does not follow one particular detective and each book focuses on a new main character.

After publishing The Trespasser in 2016, French published two standalone novels, The Witch Elm and The Searcher, both of which are also set in Ireland. French noted that The Searcher was intended to be a standalone story, before revisiting the setting as a trilogy.

French's ninth novel, The Hunter, was released in March 2024. The Hunter was published to positive reviews. Bruce Desilva wrote, "And as usual, in a Tana French novel, the characters are well-drawn, the dialogue is superb, the settings are vivid, and the tight prose is often lyrical." A major story element is the strong summer heat, unnatural for Ireland, creating tension and reminding characters of the subtle threat of climate change.

The Keeper, released in March 2026, is the third and final novel in the mystery series set in the west of Ireland and featuring retired Chicago police detective Cal Hooper.

French’s focus on the daily lives of the residents of rural Ardnakelty, first explored in The Searcher and The Hunter, continues in The Keeper. Sarah Lyall wrote of the series, “They’re slower paced and more interior than conventional mysteries; much of the suspense arises from the nuances of small details. Conversations that seem like exchanges of pleasantries become masterly interrogation scenes.”

As Cal experiences the fallout from a local tragedy, the community is challenged by tensions between tradition and cultural change.

In many of French's novels, she explores the idea of class and wealth, inspired by the Celtic Tiger and the subsequent 2008 recession's effect on the Irish economy.

=== Dublin Murder Squad ===
- In the Woods. Viking Penguin, 2007. ISBN 978-0-670-03860-2
- The Likeness. Viking Penguin 2008. ISBN 978-0143115625
- Faithful Place. Viking Penguin, 2010. ISBN 978-0670021871
- Broken Harbour. Viking Penguin, 2012. ISBN 978-0-670-02365-3
- The Secret Place. Viking Penguin, 2014. ISBN 978-0-670-02632-6
- The Trespasser. Viking Penguin, 2016. ISBN 978-1-444-75562-6

=== Cal Hooper ===
- The Searcher. Viking Penguin, 2020. ISBN 978-0-735-22465-0
- The Hunter. Viking Penguin, 2024. ISBN 978-0-241-68426-9
- The Keeper. Viking Penguin, 2026. ISBN 978-0-593-49346-5

=== Other ===
- The Witch Elm. Viking Penguin, 2018. ISBN 978-0-735-22462-9

== Awards ==
- 2007 - Finalist, Los Angeles Times Book Prize for Mystery/Thriller for In the Woods
- 2008 - Winner, Edgar Award for Best First Novel for In the Woods
- 2008 - Winner, Anthony Award, Best First Novel for In the Woods
- 2008 - Winner, Macavity Award, Best First Mystery for In the Woods
- 2008 - Winner, Barry Award for Best First Novel for In the Woods
- 2010 - Finalist, Los Angeles Times Book Prize for Mystery/Thriller for Faithful Place
- 2012 - Winner, Los Angeles Times Book Prize for Mystery/Thriller for Broken Harbour
- 2012 - Winner, Irish Book Award, Irish Crime Fiction Award for Broken Harbour
- 2012 - Nominee, International Dublin Literary Award for Faithful Place

== Television ==
In 2015, Euston Films & Veritas acquired TV production rights. Sarah Phelps wrote the screenplay, which she based on both In the Woods and The Likeness, for the eight-episode series of Dublin Murders, commissioned by the BBC for BBC One and Starz, with RTÉ later joining the project. Filming commenced in 2018 in Belfast and Dublin and continued in Dublin to late February 2019. Broadcast began on BBC One on 14 October 2019, on RTÉ One on 16 October 2019, and on Starz on 10 November 2019.
