= The Searcher (novel) =

2020 mystery novel by Tana French

- Author: Tana French
- Genre: mystery, thriller, western
- Publisher: Viking Press
- Publication date: October 6, 2020
- ISBN: 978-0-7352-2465-0
- Followed by: The Hunter

The Searcher is a mystery novel by American-Irish writer Tana French. It was published by Viking Press on October 6, 2020. The plot follows former Chicago police officer Cal Hooper, who has moved to a rural village in Western Ireland, as he investigates the disappearance of a local teenager.

== Plot ==
Cal Hooper, disillusioned with his work as a Chicago police officer, moves to Ardnakelty, a small rural village in Western Ireland, to live a more quiet life. Cal is befriended by his talkative neighbor Mart Lavin and twelve-year-old Trey Reddy, an outsider in Ardnakelty. Trey convinces Cal to investigate the disappearance of an older brother, Brendan.

Already suspicious of Cal, the people of Ardnakelty, including Mart, are unhelpful in his investigation and warn him not to interfere. Cal eventually discovers that Brendan was involved in a Dublin-based drug ring. Mart confesses that he and a group of Ardnakelty men confronted Brendan while he was on his way to meet with members of the drug ring. The confrontation resulted in a fight and Brendan was killed. The men buried Brendan in a bog.

It is also revealed that Cal left his job as a police officer after his partner shot at a Black teenager. Cal corroborated his partner's story that the teen was reaching for something in his pocket, even though Cal was uncertain that was true.

Cal tells Trey what happened to Brendan, and she promises never to act on her knowledge.

== Background ==
French has stated that The Searcher was influenced by the American genre of western fiction, and that the title of the novel is an allusion to the 1956 film The Searchers, directed by John Ford.

== Publication ==
The Searcher was published by Viking Press on October 6, 2020. French has stated that she finished her first draft the novel on February 28, 2020.

French had published seven novels before The Searcher, including six in the Dublin Murder Squad series of mystery novels. In 2024, French published a sequel to The Searcher titled The Hunter, which takes place two years after the events of The Searcher.

== Reception ==
Maureen Corrigan of NPR praised French's slow-building plot and eerie prose, stating that The Searcher "may be her best yet."

Several critics noted the moral ambiguity and failures of the criminal justice system that French explores in the novel. Some, such as Laura Miller in Slate and Constance Grady in Vox, expressed a wish that French had confronted these themes more deeply.
