= Elizabeth Pochoda =

American journalist (1941–2025)

Elizabeth Pochoda (December 13, 1941 – May 8, 2025) was an American journalist. She was a writer and editor for publications such as The Nation, The Daily News, Vogue, Vanity Fair, and House & Garden. Pochoda also taught literature at Temple University. She died on May 8, 2025, at the age of 83.
