= In the Woods =

2007 novel by Tana French

- Cover of In The Woods
- Author: Tana French
- Language: English
- Series: Dublin Murder Squad
- Genre: Mystery
- Publisher: Viking Adult
- Publication date: 30 January 2007
- Publication place: Ireland
- Media type: Print (hardcover)
- Pages: 496
- ISBN: 978-0-670-03860-2
- OCLC: 191864570
- Dewey Decimal: 823/.92 22
- LC Class: PR6106.R457 I52 2007
- Followed by: The Likeness

In the Woods is a 2007 mystery novel by Tana French about a pair of Irish detectives and their investigation of the murder of a twelve-year-old girl. It is the first book in French's Dublin Murder Squad series. The novel won several awards such as the 2008 Edgar Award for Best First Novel by an American Author, the 2008 Barry Award for Best First Novel, the 2008 Macavity Award for Best First Mystery Novel, and the 2008 Anthony Award for Best First Novel. In the Woods and The Likeness, the second book of the Dublin Murder Squad series, are the inspiration for the BBC and Starz's 2019 Dublin Murders, an eight-episode series.

== Plot ==
In 1984, three children (Jamie Rowan, Adam Ryan and Peter Savage) disappear into the woods near the Irish estate of Knocknaree. Hours later, Adam is found near-catatonic, standing against an oak tree with mysterious cuts across the back of his shirt, and his shoes and socks soaked in blood. Despite an intensive search, his friends Jamie and Peter are never found, and Adam has no memory of what happened. In the aftermath of the incident, Adam is sent to boarding school, where he begins using his middle name Robert and acquires an English accent.

Twenty years later, Ryan has become a detective in the elite Dublin murder squad. Ryan and Detective Cassie Maddox, his best friend and partner, are assigned to investigate a murder in Knocknaree. The victim, 12-year old Katy Devlin, was discovered on a ceremonial stone table at the site of an archaeological dig run by Dr. Ian Hunt and his university students. Forensics determine Katy was attacked and suffocated Monday night, and that the body was kept somewhere else before it was moved to the dig site Tuesday night and discovered Wednesday morning. Ryan and Maddox interview students Damien Donnelly and Mel Jackson, who discovered the body, and Mark Hanly, the student supervisor who is impatient to return to work as there is only a month left until the site will be destroyed to make way for a motorway. Damien tells them he saw a bald man in a tracksuit walking on the main road on Monday evening. The detectives also discover a campsite in the woods overlooking the dig.

Ryan and Maddox inform Katy's family of her death – father Jonathan, mother Margaret, Katy's older sister Rosalind, and her twin sister Jessica. They are disturbed by the family dynamic, as Rosalind is overly sexual for her age and Jessica is silent and pathologically shy. After learning that Katy, who was set to attend the prestigious Royal Ballet School the following month, suffered from unexplained vomiting and diarrhoea for years, they begin to suspect her parents of child abuse. An autopsy reveals Katy was sexually violated after her death with a wooden instrument. Maddox notes that Katy's murder seems to have been tentative, and the violation half-hearted, and speculates that they aren't looking for a paedophile. When questioned, Mark admits to camping in the woods periodically to keep vigil over the site, which he regards as sacred, but he angrily denies involvement in Katy's death and has an alibi for Tuesday night when the body was moved. He admits to the detectives he was camping on Monday night, and saw someone with a flashlight moving across the field around the time Katy died.

Crime scene techs discover a plastic hairtie and an old drop of blood near where Katy's body was found, which Ryan recognizes may be traces from the 1984 incident. Despite the possibility that the cases are linked, he chooses to conceal his true identity from the squad's supervisor, Superintendent O’Kelly, knowing he would be removed from the case if he admitted the connection. Maddox agrees to go along with his decision. Detective Sam O’Neill is assigned to investigate the possibility that Katy was killed as a warning to Jonathan, the organizer of a "Move the Motorway" campaign attempting to protect the archaeological site, and begins to run down a series of threatening phone calls Jonathan received. Ryan and Maddox become friends with O’Neill, and the three begin to spend their evenings together at Maddox's apartment working on the case. Rosalind brings a scared Jessica to meet with Ryan, and she reluctantly confirms seeing the same tracksuited figure that Damien described. In an attempt to get Rosalind to open up about possible abuse, Ryan tells her that two of his childhood friends disappeared, but she still refuses to say anything.

As the weeks progress, Ryan begins regaining memories from his childhood, and also becomes increasingly irritable and dependent on alcohol. He remembers seeing a teenage Jonathan and his friends rape one of their girlfriends in the woods, but while Jonathan admits to the rape, and to sensing the presence of a monstrous figure in the woods during the incident, he insists that he had nothing to do with Katy's death or the children's disappearance. While interrogating Jonathan, Ryan becomes enraged and nearly attacks him before Maddox intervenes. Maddox tells him the story of when she left university after being emotionally manipulated by one of her friends, a psychopath who turned the school against her and threatened to rape her. Ryan is sympathetic but notes to the reader that he didn't understand what she was actually telling him. Meanwhile, O’Neill discovers that the phone calls came from a builder with a lot of money riding on the motorway's construction. He taps the builder's phone, and learns to his dismay that his politician uncle has taken bribes from the builder to arrange the motorway. When he goes to O’Kelly with this information, O’Kelly orders him to destroy the evidence and forget about it, lest O’Neill's uncle end their careers.

Finally, Ryan returns to the woods and camps there overnight in an attempt to regain his lost memory of the day his friends vanished. He remembers that he kissed Jamie, and that Peter concocted a plan for them to run away and prevent Jamie from having to go to boarding school. The three of them were interrupted by someone in the woods and sensed a figure like the one Jonathan described. They began to run away, and Ryan fell behind and watched his friends hop a stone wall. Ryan wakes up from his memory, and has a panic attack. He flees to his car, convinced something in the wood is watching him, and notes to the reader that by running away from the truth, he lost the memory of his friends' last day forever. Ryan calls Maddox to pick him up, and the two sleep together for the first time. Afterward, Ryan becomes convinced Maddox will want a relationship with him and refuses to speak with her. Their relationship deteriorates rapidly. Rosalind visits Ryan during this period, and senses the tension between them; overwhelmed, Ryan nearly kisses Rosalind before stopping himself. Angry at his rejection, she storms away.

While observing the dig in Knocknaree, Ryan realizes the instrument used to violate Katy's body was a trowel. The police re-examine the scene and discover that the dig's finds shed was the murder site. The only people who had keys to the shed were Dr. Hunt, Mark, and Damien. Under interrogation by Ryan and Maddox, Damien breaks down and admits to killing Katy on Monday, then hiding the body when he realized someone was camping in the woods. He moved the body on Tuesday and pretended to discover it to explain the presence of any trace evidence. However, he refuses to discuss his motive. Maddox realizes that Damien lying about the tracksuited figure implicates Rosalind, who coached Jessica into verifying the story. Unwilling to believe that Rosalind could have anything to do with the crime, Ryan blows up at Maddox, accusing her of jealousy, and refuses to participate in questioning Rosalind.

The next morning, an enraged O’Kelly confronts Ryan over withholding his true identity, and puts him on desk duty. Ryan accuses Maddox of revealing his secret, but Maddox shows him the video of Rosalind's interrogation, in which Rosalind revealed it. With their friendship shattered, Ryan can only watch as Maddox and O’Neill expertly convince Damien to reveal the truth: after meeting Rosalind while she was volunteering at her father's "Move the Motorway" booth, Damien fell in love with her. Rosalind manipulated Damien into believing that her father was raping and beating his daughters, that Katy was the mastermind behind it, and that he needed to kill her to protect Rosalind. Recognizing her as a psychopath, Maddox volunteers to wear a wire, and successfully tricks Rosalind into admitting she had been poisoning Katy for years, tricked her into going to meet Damien at a time when Rosalind would have an alibi, and manipulated Damien into killing her out of jealousy over Katy's talent for ballet. However, the confession proves inadmissible as Rosalind is only 17 years old, a fact that Ryan missed weeks earlier due to his infatuation with her.

Damien is convicted of murder and sentenced to life in prison, and Rosalind testifies against him at his trial, claiming he killed Katy as revenge after Rosalind broke up with him. Ryan meets with Jonathan Devlin, who admits that he suspected Rosalind's involvement from the beginning but didn't want to know the truth. He is insisting that Rosalind see a psychiatrist and will make her live at home during university to monitor her, though he knows there is little chance that she will change, especially as Margaret is entirely under her spell. He is sending Jessica, who has attempted suicide, to live with his sister to protect her from Rosalind. Devlin assures Ryan he had nothing to do with his friends' disappearance.

Ryan is suspended and investigated, but ultimately keeps his detective rank to avoid a scandal, though his career is effectively over. He is removed from the murder squad, and assigned to work as a "floater", assisting with other detectives' cases as needed. Maddox transfers to Domestic Violence, and she and O’Neill are engaged to be married. Late one night, Ryan drunkenly calls Maddox and apologizes, saying he loves her, but she says nothing and merely puts down the phone. Knowing the 1984 case will never be solved, Ryan goes to watch the building of the motorway, which has gone through as planned after O’Neill buried the evidence of his uncle's corruption. A construction worker hands him an ancient metal pendant that was buried near the stone table depicting a figure with antlers. He offers to let Ryan keep it, but Ryan returns it and leaves.

== Reception ==
Thomas Gaughan of Booklist gave In the Woods a starred review and hailed it as “...a superior novel about cops, murder, memory, relationships, and modern Ireland. The characters of Ryan and Maddox, as well as a handful of others, are vividly developed... Equally striking is the picture of contemporary Ireland, booming economically and fixated on the shabbiest aspects of American popular culture. An outstanding debut and a series to watch for procedural fans." Publishers Weekly praised author French, saying she “... expertly walks the line between police procedural and psychological thriller in her debut" and that "Ryan and Maddox are empathetic and flawed heroes, whose partnership and friendship elevate the narrative beyond a gory tale of murdered children and repressed childhood trauma." Kirkus Reviews said of the novel, "When not lengthily bogged down in angst, a readable, non-formulaic police procedural with a twist. It's ultimately the confession of a damaged man."

== Characters ==
- Dublin Murder Squad:
  - Detective Inspector Adam Robert Ryan – The narrator and protagonist, who survived a traumatic and mysterious experience at age 12. He is relatively new to the murder squad, and wonders if he was hired because he looks and sounds the part, with a "perfect BBC accent". Ryan is assigned to investigate a case that may be linked to his experience. He identifies himself in the opening pages as an unreliable narrator, and describes himself as someone who "always chooses the anticlimactic over the irrevocable".
  - Detective Inspector Cassie Maddox – Ryan's partner and best friend. She nearly graduated with a psychology degree, but left university in her last year for reasons she doesn't like to discuss. Other detectives on the squad often use her as an amateur profiler in their cases. Maddox is the only woman on the murder squad, having been given a transfer to her choice of assignment after being stabbed during an undercover operation. She is easygoing and quick witted, but can be deeply affected by her work.
  - Detective Inspector Sam O’Neill – A seven-year veteran of the squad who was promoted to it quickly because his uncle is an influential politician. He is likable and reliable, but somewhat oblivious of his privilege.
  - Detective Superintendent O’Kelly – The supervisor of the squad, who is sexist and predictably self-serving.
  - Detective Inspector Quigley – The least-liked member of the squad, who is obnoxious and considers himself "edgy".
  - Kiernan & McCabe – Retired members of the murder squad who investigated the 1984 disappearances in Knocknaree.
- The Devlin family:
  - Jonathan Devlin – A senior bank teller who grew up in Knocknaree and is leading a campaign to stop a motorway that is set to be run through an important historical site.
  - Margaret Devlin – Jonathan's wife, who drifts around in a Valium-induced fog.
  - Rosalind Devlin – The oldest daughter of the family. Rosalind wears a great deal of makeup and styles her hair and clothes very carefully for a teenage girl. She is attractive and often overtly sexual.
  - Katy Devlin – The 12-year old murder victim. Katy was a dedicated ballet student who was excited to attend the prestigious Royal Ballet School. She was pleasant and protective of her twin sister. Katy had a history of medical problems that mysteriously stopped a few months before her death.
  - Jessica Devlin – Katy's twin sister, who rarely speaks and appears very fragile.
- Sophie Turner – A crime scene tech who Ryan has a crush on. Professional and effective.
- Dr. Cooper – The state pathologist who conducts autopsies in murder investigations.
- Peter Savage – One of Ryan's best friends at 12 years old, who disappeared in the woods and was never found.
- Jamie Rowan – Ryan and Peter's other best friend at 12 years old, who also disappeared. She was heartbroken over her mother sending her to boarding school.
- Simone Cameron – Katy's ballet instructor. Utterly devoted to Katy, who she recognized as having a rare combination of talent and dedication.
- Dr. Ian Hunt – An absent-minded university professor running the archaeological dig in Knocknaree.
- Mark Hanly – A disturbingly intense university student who believes destroying the Knocknaree site is a grave injustice. He supervises the rest of the students on the dig site.
- Damien Donnelly – One of the university students on the Knocknaree dig. Wimpy and used to being protected by women.
- Melanie Jackson – One of the university students on the Knocknaree dig. She is sleeping with Mark and admires his passion for history.
- Sean – One of the university students on the Knocknaree dig. A smartass who doesn't take anything seriously.

== Awards and nominations ==
- Edgar Award for Best First Novel, 2008
- Barry Award for Best First Novel, 2008
- Macavity Award for Best First Mystery Novel, 2008
- Anthony Award for Best First Novel, 2008
