= Faithful Place =

Book by Tana French

- Author: Tana French
- Language: English
- Series: Dublin Murder Squad #3
- Genre: Mystery
- Publisher: Viking Penguin
- Publication date: 13 July 2010
- Publication place: Ireland
- Media type: Print (hardcover)
- Pages: 416
- ISBN: 978-0670021871
- Dewey Decimal: 823/.92 22
- Followed by: Broken Harbour

Faithful Place is a 2010 crime novel by Tana French. The book is set in Dublin, featuring undercover detective Frank Mackey, who was a supporting character in French's previous novel, The Likeness. It is the third installment of French's loosely related Dublin Murder Squad series. Each follows a case in the heart of Ireland, with overlapping, complex characters that get involved in cases tied to their pasts.

== Plot ==
In December 1985, 19-year old Frank Mackey plans to run away to London with his girlfriend Rosie Daly to escape the recession and poverty running rampant throughout Ireland, and Rosie’s father, who violently disapproves of their relationship. Frank plans to meet her at midnight at the top of the Faithful Place cul-de-sac in the Liberties, the working-class Dublin neighborhood where they both live. When Rosie doesn’t show up, Frank looks for her in the abandoned tenement house at 16 Faithful Place, where he finds a note from Rosie apologizing for leaving without him. Heartbroken, he leaves the note behind and departs on his own.

22 years later, Frank has become a respected detective on the Undercover squad of the Dublin police, and is divorced from his estranged wife Olivia. His weekend with his nine-year old daughter Holly is interrupted by a phone call from his sister Jackie, who informs him that some builders stripping 16 Faithful Place for parts have found Rosie’s suitcase hidden behind a fireplace. Frank returns home for the first time in over two decades, and is reluctantly reunited with his family — his alcoholic father, who violently abused the rest of the family throughout Frank’s childhood, and now suffers from back problems and ill health; his emotionally abusive mother; older sister Carmel, now a married mother of four; older brother Shay, a bike shop worker living above their childhood flat; younger brother Kevin, a TV salesman juggling multiple girlfriends; and younger sister Jackie, a hairdresser and the only member of the family with whom Frank is still in contact.

Frank confirms that the suitcase is Rosie’s, and spends the night on his parents’ sofa bed, wondering if this means Rosie didn’t abandon him after all, an event that shaped all of Frank’s future relationships and life choices. In the morning, he and Kevin meet with Rosie’s parents and younger sister Nora, who ask him to investigate despite the Daly family’s longstanding feud with the Mackeys. Frank surreptitiously takes their fingerprints and thinks back to the last time he saw Rosie, the day before they were set to depart. Frank interviews Rosie’s childhood friend Mandy and works out the route Rosie would have used to sneak out, then explores 16 Faithful Place, which used to be a hangout for local neighborhood kids. He summons police technicians, who uncover Rosie’s skeletal remains underneath a heavy concrete slab in the basement.

Mick ‘Scorcher’ Kennedy, a Murder squad detective and longtime rival of Frank’s, is assigned to the case. He takes Frank’s statement in a local pub and warns Frank to stay out of the way of his investigation. Frank thinks back to the night he and Rosie made their final plans to leave, a week before her disappearance. He is joined by his siblings, who drink with him and attempt to comfort him. They discuss the looming economic recession, and Shay reveals his plans to buy the bike shop where he works. Eventually, Shay, who always bullied Frank as a child and resents him for leaving after he and Carmel protected the younger children from their father’s worst abuses, nearly provokes a fight. Frank declares that he never returned home because he was ashamed of his family and believes they were the reason Rosie left, then storms out in a drunken rage, planning never to return.

Frank goes behind Scorcher’s back to meet with Cooper, the police pathologist, who informs him that Rosie was killed by someone who grabbed her by the throat and slammed her repeatedly against a wall. He picks up Holly from Olivia’s and apologizes to both of them for his absence, and spends the rest of the day with her and Jackie while dodging several calls from Kevin. The next day, Jackie calls him in hysterics to report that Kevin is dead, having gone out the top window of 16 Faithful Place and broken his neck. Scorcher shows Frank the first half of the note that Rosie left, which was found on Kevin’s body, and which makes clear that the entire note was meant for her family, indicating Rosie did plan to leave with Frank before being killed. Frank suspects someone pushed Kevin out the window and planted the note on his body, but Scorcher believes Kevin killed Rosie and committed suicide rather than wait for the investigation to expose him.

Taking vacation time from his job, Frank convinces Stephen Moran, a rookie detective assigned to the case, to secretly feed him information behind Scorcher’s back. He attends Kevin’s wake and has a heart-to-heart with Carmel before his father gets drunk and nearly comes to blows with Rosie’s father, Matt Daly. Frank takes his father into the backyard and bitterly reminisces with him, then drives to Olivia’s to discuss Kevin’s death. Their conversation is interrupted by Holly, who breaks down in hysterics when she hears that Kevin is dead, and Frank realizes that Olivia and Jackie have been allowing her to spend time with his family behind his back for the last year. He confronts Olivia, who apologizes but confronts Frank with the truth that one of the reasons they divorced is that he never got over Rosie leaving. He spends the night in the guest bedroom and talks with Holly the following morning, learning to his surprise that his family went out of their way to make her feel welcome.

Frank meets with Imelda, another of Rosie’s friends, who confirms that she hid the suitcase in the fireplace to help Rosie prevent her father from finding out about her plans to leave. Frank suspects Imelda must have told someone else where Rosie would be, but she denies it and orders him out of her house. Stephen shares the fingerprint and autopsy reports with Frank, and confirms that Scorcher is convinced Kevin was the killer and plans to quietly close the case within a few days. Frank is impressed by Stephen’s insights and detective skills when he points out that the note found on Kevin’s body was wiped clean of fingerprints, which would be inconsistent with a suicide. Frank realizes that his father once attacked Shay in exactly the way that Rosie was killed, and begins to suspect him of both murders.

That night, Frank sneaks into the Dalys’ backyard, and reminisces about the night when he was 18 and Rosie convinced him to go to London. When Nora goes to bed, he attracts her attention and they discuss the feud between their families, which Nora believes dates back to a romance between her mother and Frank’s father. They share a kiss that reminds Frank of what might have been with Rosie before she returns to bed. The next day, Frank sees his mother and she confirms that his father was in love with Mrs. Daly and turned to drink out of resentment over Matt Daly stealing the life he believed should have been his. Convinced of his father’s guilt, he returns to Imelda, who attempts to scare him off by calling Scorcher. Frank returns the next morning, breaks into Imelda’s house, smashes her TV, and violently intimidates her into admitting who she told of Rosie’s plans: Shay, who she wanted to sleep with.

Frank remembers the day when he was 17 and Rosie’s father forced her to break up with him, which led them to sleep together for the first time and continue their romance in secret. He forces Stephen, who is coming far too close to the truth for Frank’s liking, to drop the case, then picks up Holly for the weekend and agrees to bring her to Sunday dinner with his family. At dinner, Frank subtly tortures Shay with the knowledge of his guilt. Frank’s father calls him out for using Holly as a way to gain access to the family for his own purposes, and cryptically suggests Frank should leave the past alone. Frank eavesdrops on Shay helping Holly with her maths homework in his flat upstairs, and realizes that Holly manipulated him so she would have a chance to confront Shay about something she found weeks earlier: the first half of Rosie’s letter, hidden in Shay’s flat. Shay tries to convince Holly to keep the letter a secret, but Frank interrupts and sends her downstairs.

Shay admits to Frank that he killed Rosie to prevent Frank from leaving home, which forced Shay to remain living there to protect Kevin and Jackie from their parents. He denies killing Kevin, but Frank points out that if Kevin had woken up to find both his brothers missing from their shared room, he would remember and it would incriminate Shay just as he was on the verge of escaping home for a second time. It is revealed to the reader that when Frank was 18, he and Shay had planned to kill their father and make it look like an accident, but Frank abandoned the plan at the last moment when Rosie proposed leaving for London. The brothers fight and Frank wins, coming close to killing Shay before handcuffing him instead, and calling Stephen to come arrest him. He shares a final cigarette with Shay while they wait.

Frank rushes an angry Holly out of the house, and speaks candidly to her about the need to tell the truth about her conversation with Shay. He drives her home and reveals everything that happened to Olivia, who is horrified that their daughter has spent time with a killer and will have to testify against her uncle. Frank and Olivia reconcile, and she agrees to go on a date with him. Shay is charged with two counts of murder and denied bail, though it is left unclear whether he will be convicted. Scorcher attempts to file complaints about Frank’s conduct, but they go nowhere. Weeks later, Frank calls Jackie, who agrees to continue spending time with Holly, but admits it would be better to keep her away from the rest of the family for now, and that she is uncertain whether she can ever forgive Frank for having Shay arrested. Frank attempts to buy a new TV for Imelda’s family, but is turned away for breaking the Liberties code against informing. He returns to Faithful Place and watches the snow fall, remembering the first time he and Rosie ever kissed at age 16.

== Characters ==
- Frank Mackey – Protagonist and detective determined to find out what happened to his childhood sweetheart, Rosie Daly
- Rosie Daly – Young woman murdered to be kept from running off and eloping with Frank Mackey
- Holly Mackey – Frank Mackey's 9-year-old daughter; inadvertently finds out the truth about Rosie Daly
- Seamus "Shay" Mackey – Frank Mackey's older brother; has anger issues and is unsuccessful because of his ties to his bitter, alcoholic parents
- Kevin Mackey – Frank Mackey's younger brother

== Style ==
Maureen Corrigan of The Washington Post stated that "the voice is what grabs you first" and continues on to say that "[the main character]'s voice is so wry, bitter and just plain alive".

== Reception ==
Regina Marler of the Los Angeles Times described the book as "not a page-turner but a page-lingerer" and that "French gives us a clear-eyed portrait of the Liberties as seen through a murder." Janet Maslin of The New York Times remarked that "the first thing that Ms. French does so well in “Faithful Place” is to inhabit fully a scrappy, shrewd, privately heartbroken middle-aged man. The second is to capture the Mackey family’s long-brewing resentments in a way that’s utterly realistic on many levels. Sibling rivalries, class conflicts, old grudges, adolescent flirtations and memories of childhood violence are all deftly embedded in this novel, as is the richly idiomatic Dublinese." The Washington Post described the book as "breathtaking...devastating." Finally, Kirkus Reviews remarked that "the charming narrative will leave readers begging for a sequel."

== Awards and nominations ==
- Nominated for the International Dublin Literary Award, 2012
- Nominated for the Edgar Award, Best Novel, 2011
- Finalist for the Irish Book Awards, Best Mystery Novel, 2010
