= The Secret Place (book) =

Book by Tana French

- Author: Tana French
- Language: English
- Series: Dublin Murder Squad #5
- Genre: Mystery
- Publisher: Viking Penguin
- Publication date: 2014
- Publication place: Ireland
- Media type: Print (hardcover)
- Pages: 452
- ISBN: 978-0-670-02632-6
- Dewey Decimal: 823/.92 - dc23
- Followed by: The Trespasser

The Secret Place is a 2014 novel by Tana French set in Ireland. The Washington Post named the book one of the five best thrillers of 2014. Amazon.com named it one of the best books of 2014 in the mystery, thriller and suspense category.

== Plot summary ==
Much of the novel takes place at St. Kilda's, a girls' boarding school in Dublin. The chapters alternate between the points of view of detective Stephen Moran and the students of St. Kilda's.

The key characters are eight teenage girls, members of rival cliques. Chris Harper, a teenage boy, is murdered on St. Kilda's grounds. The initial police investigation is inconclusive. A year later, 16-year-old Holly volunteers information to Moran. She has discovered a picture of Chris, along with the statement "I know who killed him", posted on a school bulletin board called the "Secret Place". Moran is assigned to work with senior detective Antoinette Conway to investigate. Moran and Conway question all eight girls and find that there were some close relationships between Chris and most of the eight girls. After further investigation, they find evidence that links Chris's murder to Holly's clique. When the detectives grill Holly, her father, detective Frank Mackey, intervenes and complicates the investigation.

== Continuity ==
Several characters in The Secret Place appeared in previous novels by this author; these including Stephen Moran (Faithful Place), Frank Mackey (The Likeness and Faithful Place), and Holly Mackey (Faithful Place).

== Critical reception ==
The book received favorable reviews in prominent publications. Some critics took issue with the teenage characters' frequent use of slang and text messaging in plot exposition.

The Washington Post praised the novel as "another eerie triumph for French" and named her "one of today's top suspense novelists." Kirkus Reviews stated that the author "has few peers in her combination of literary stylishness and intricate, clockwork plotting" and noted that "the novel explores the mysteries of friendship, loyalty and betrayal, not only among adolescents, but within the police force as well."

The Boston Globe noted that French often "writes beautifully," while stating that the teenage characters' use of slang and text messaging "doesn’t kill the magic but it does slow the pace of what could have been another French triumph." In a similar vein, the New York Times praised the novel as "much more than a genre piece" but noted that the teenage characters' frequent use of American slang "may not make this the most inviting milieu for those who like the sheer Irishness of her other novels."
