= Broken Harbour =

Book by Tana French

- Cover of Broken Harbour
- Author: Tana French
- Language: English
- Series: Dublin Murder Squad
- Genre: Mystery
- Publisher: Viking Adult
- Publication date: 2 July 2012
- Publication place: Ireland
- Media type: Print (hardcover)
- Pages: 496
- ISBN: 978-0-670-02365-3
- OCLC: 2011042397
- Dewey Decimal: 823/.92 23
- LC Class: PR6106.R457 B76 2012
- Followed by: The Secret Place

Broken Harbour is a crime novel written by Irish novelist Tana French, originally published on 2 July 2012 by Hatchette Books Ireland. It is the fourth book in the Dublin Murder Squad series and was first published in the USA by Viking Penguin a member of the Penguin Group (USA). Tana French was honored with the 'Irish Crime Fiction Award' a bestseller list, eventually reaching the No.3 position. It was also listed in the 'Ireland AM Crime Fiction Books of the Year 2009–2013'.

By April 2013, the book had stormed into the Irish book charts to occupy the third position as a best seller. It was also listed in the 'Ireland AM Crime Fiction Books of the Year 2009–2013'.

== Plot ==
In a ghost estate outside Dublin – half-built, half-inhabited, half-abandoned – two children and their father are dead. The mother is on her way to intensive care. Scorcher Kennedy is given the case because he is the Murder Squad’s star detective. At first he and his rookie partner, Richie, think this is a simple one: Pat Spain was a casualty of the recession, so he killed his children, tried to kill his wife Jenny, and finished off with himself. But there are too many inexplicable details and the evidence is pointing in two directions at once.

Scorcher’s personal life disturbed, seeing the case on the news sent his sister Dina off-the-rails again, and she’s resurrecting something that Scorcher thought he had under control: what happened to their family, one summer at Broken Harbour, back when they were children. The neat compartments of his life are breaking down, and the sudden tangle of work and family is putting both at risk.

== Characters ==
- Michael (Scorcher) Kennedy: Detective at the Dublin Murder Squad with an enviable reputation described as 'on the Murder Squad for ten years, and for seven of those, had the highest solve rate in the place'
- Richie Curran: a rookie assigned to work with Mick.
- Dr Cooper: Chief Medical Examiner
- Dina Kennedy: Mike's younger sister, described as 'one of those old pen-and-ink sketches of fairies: slight as a dancer, with skin that never tans, full pale lips and huge blue eyes'.
- Spain family: Patrick Spain (husband), Jennifer Spain (Wife) and children Emma & Jack- as the victims of the crime.

== Reception ==
- ' Broken Harbour is a tale about the different facets of obsession and insanity, and it winds up to a finale that is almost too distressing. The best yet of French's four excellent thrillers, it leaves its readers – just like the Spains – throat-deep in terror. ' - The Guardian
- ' Broken Harbour proves anew that (Tana French) is one of the most talented crime writers alive. '- The Washington Post
- ' Instated Ms. French as one of crime fiction’s reigning grand dames — a Celtic tigress. ' - The Washington Times
