= Ivy Pochoda =

American novelist and squash player

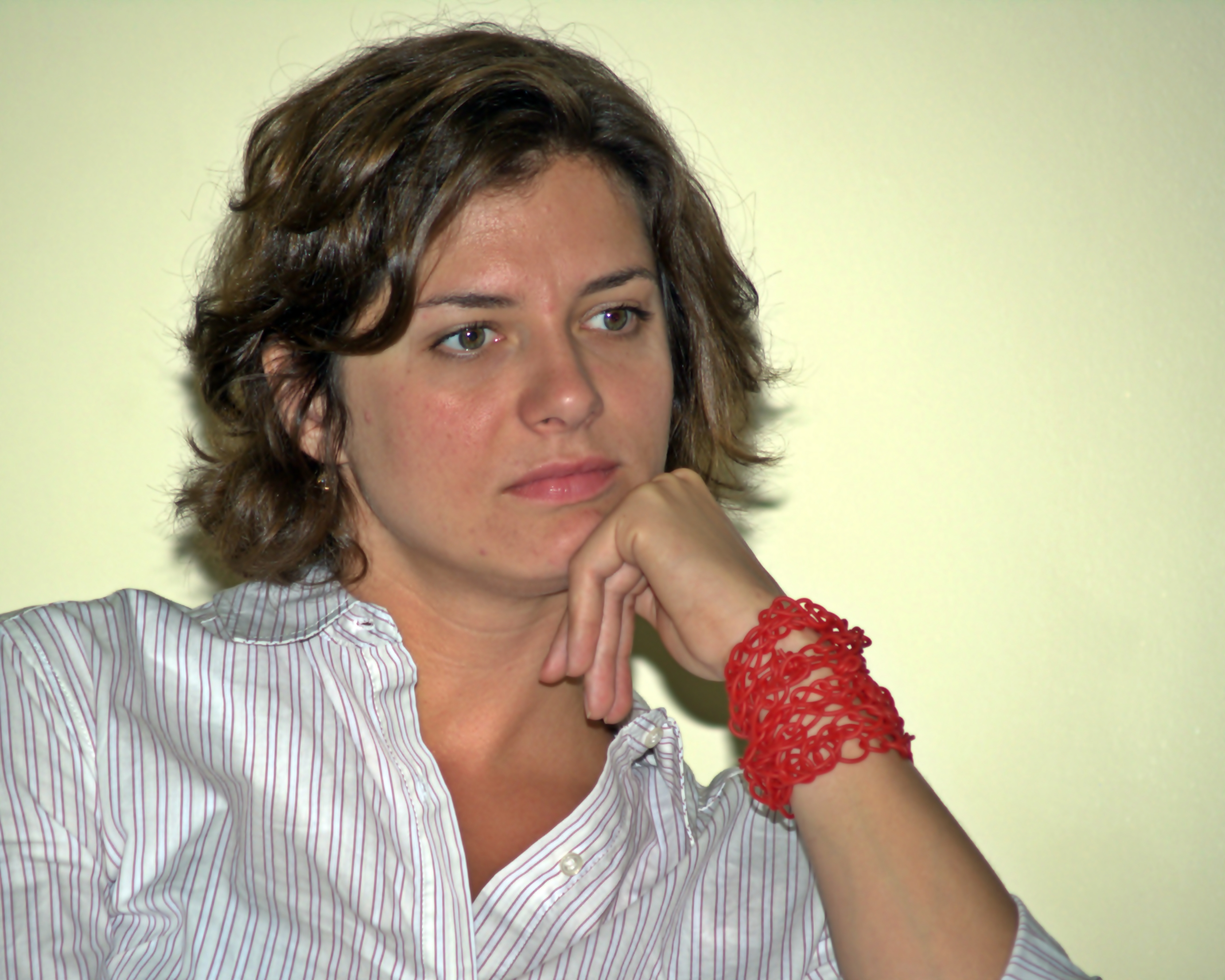
- Ivy Pochoda BBF 2010 Shankbone
- Born: Ivy Claire Pochoda; January 22, 1977 (age 48) New York City, U.S.
- Occupation: Novelist
- Education: Harvard College (BA); Bennington College (MFA)
- Genre: Fiction
- Spouse: Justin Nowell (m. 2011)

Website
- www.ivypochoda.com

Ivy Claire Pochoda (born January 22, 1977) is an American novelist and former professional squash player. Pochoda grew up in Brooklyn, New York. She currently lives in Los Angeles.

== Personal life ==
Pochoda grew up in Brooklyn, New York, where she attended Saint Ann's School. She currently lives in Harvard Heights, a neighborhood in the West Adams district in Los Angeles.

== Education ==
Pochoda holds a BA from Harvard College (1998) in Classical Greek and English and American Literature. She also received an MFA in 2011 from Bennington College in Fiction. She was the 2009 James Merrill House Writer in Residence.

== Writing ==
Her first novel, The Art of Disappearing, was published in 2009 by St. Martin's Press. Her second novel, Visitation Street was published by Ecco, a publishing imprint of HarperCollins, in July 2013. Visitation Street is only the second title chosen by Dennis Lehane for his eponymous imprint. Sceptre, an imprint of Hodder & Stoughton, will publish Visitation Street in the United Kingdom. Wonder Valley was published by Ecco in 2017. In 2023, Sing Her Down was published by MCD Books, an imprint of Farrar, Straus and Giroux.

== Squash ==
Pochoda played squash professionally between 1998 and 2007, representing the United States during her career. She reached a career-high world ranking of 38th in March 1999, having joined Women's International Squash Players Association full-time in 1998. In her college career at Harvard University, Pochoda was individual national champion in 1998, and led Harvard to national championships in all four of her years on the team. She was also named Ivy League Rookie of the Year, Player of the Year, and was a four-time All-American and First Team all-Ivy. In May 2013, she was inducted into the Harvard Hall of Fame.

== Works ==
=== Books ===
- The Art of Disappearing (2009)
- Visitation Street (2013)
- Wonder Valley (2017)
- Epoca ~ The Tree of Ecrof (2019)
- These Women (2020)
- Sing Her Down (2023)
- Ecstasy (2025)

=== Articles ===
- Pochoda, Ivy (18 January 2013). "Squash's Preppy Problem". The New York Times.
- Pochoda, Ivy (20 October 2009). "Reading ... the Old Fashioned Way". The Huffington Post.
- Pochoda, Ivy (15 September 2009). "The Day My Book Was Born -- Will It Survive?". The Huffington Post.
