= Best Swedish Crime Novel Award =

The Best Swedish Crime Novel Award (Bästa svenska kriminalroman) is a literary prize awarded annually since 1982 by the Swedish Crime Writers' Academy. The winners of the award are listed below:

== Winners ==
| Year | Author | Original title | English title |
|---|---|---|---|
| 1982 | Leif G. W. Persson | Samhällsbärarna | The Pillars of Society |
| 1983 | Ulf Durling | Lugnet efter stormen | |
| 1984 | Staffan Westerlund | Svärtornas år | |
| 1985 | Jean Bolinder | För älskarns och mördarns skull | |
| 1986 | Staffan Westerlund | Större än sanningen | |
| 1987 | Olov Svedelid | Barnarov | |
| 1988 | Jan Guillou | I nationens intresse | |
| 1989 | Kjell-Olof Bornemark | Skyldig utan skuld | |
| 1990 | Jean Bolinder | Dödisgropen | |
| 1991 | Henning Mankell | Mördare utan ansikte | Faceless Killers |
| 1992 | Gösta Unefäldt | Polisen och mordet i stadshuset | |
| 1993 | Kerstin Ekman | Händelser vid vatten | Blackwater |
| 1994 | Håkan Nesser | Borkmanns punkt | Borkmann's Point |
| 1995 | Henning Mankell | Villospår | Sidetracked |
| 1996 | Håkan Nesser | Kvinna med födelsemärke | Woman with Birthmark |
| 1997 | Åke Edwardson | Dans med en ängel | Death Angels |
| 1998 | Inger Frimansson | God natt min älskade | Good Night, My Darling |
| 1999 | Sven Westerberg | Guds fruktansvärda frånvaro | |
| 2000 | Aino Trosell | Om hjärtat ännu slår | |
| 2001 | Åke Edwardson | Himlen är en plats på jorden | Frozen Tracks |
| 2002 | Kjell Eriksson | Prinsessan av Burundi | The Princess of Burundi |
| 2003 | Leif G. W. Persson | En annan tid, ett annat liv | Another Time, Another Life |
| 2004 | Åsa Larsson | Det blod som spillts | The Blood Spilt |
| 2005 | Inger Frimansson | Skuggan i vattnet | The Shadow in the Water |
| 2006 | Stieg Larsson | Flickan som lekte med elden | The Girl Who Played with Fire |
| 2007 | Håkan Nesser | En helt annan historia | The Root of Evil |
| 2008 | Johan Theorin | Nattfåk | The Darkest Room |
| 2009 | Anders Roslund & Börge Hellström | Tre sekunder | Three Seconds |
| 2010 | Leif G. W. Persson | Den döende detektiven | The Dying Detective |
| 2011 | Arne Dahl | Viskleken | |
| 2012 | Åsa Larsson | Till offer åt Molok | The Second Deadly Sin |
| 2013 | Christoffer Carlsson | Den osynlige mannen från Salem | |
| 2014 | Tove Alsterdal | Låt mig ta din hand | |
| 2015 | Anders de la Motte | Ultimatum | Ultimatum |
| 2016 | Malin Persson Giolito | Störst av allt | Quicksand |
| 2017 | Camilla Grebe | Husdjuret | After She's Gone |
| 2018 | Stina Jackson | Silvervägen | The Silver Road |
| 2019 | Camilla Grebe | Skuggjägaren | The Shadow Hunter |
| 2020 | Tove Alsterdal | Rotvälta | We Know You Remember |
| 2021 | Åsa Larsson | Fädernas missgärningar | The Sins of our Fathers |
| 2022 | Sara Strömberg | Skred | |
| 2023 | Christoffer Carlsson | Levande och döda | |
| 2024 | Carl-Johan Vallgren | Din tid kommer | |
