= Christoffer Carlsson (writer) =

Swedish criminologist and writer

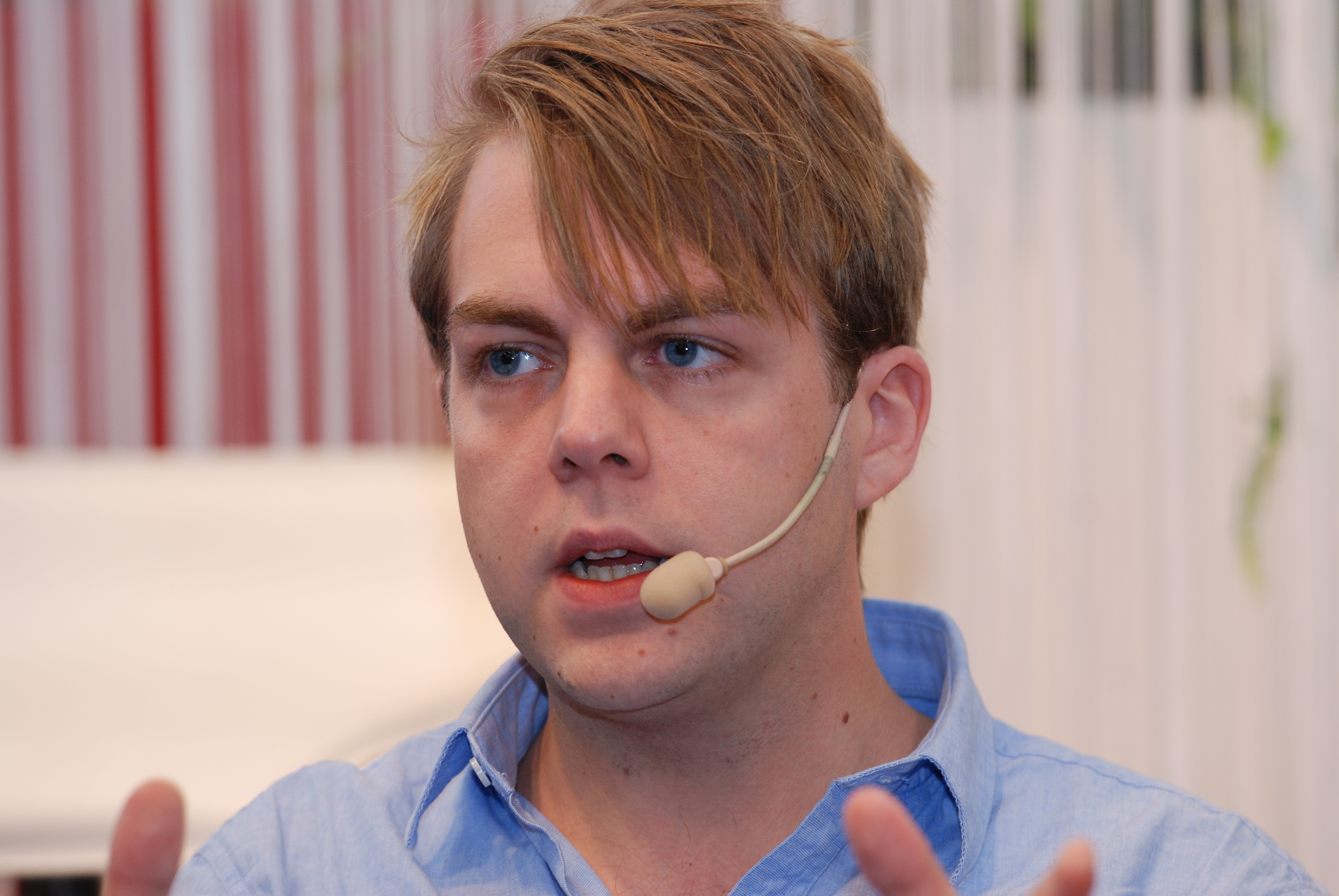
- Carlsson (2013)
- Born: 28 August 1986 (age 40); Halmstad, Sweden
- Occupations: Criminologist; writer
- Writing career
- Years active: 2010–present
- Genres: Crime fiction; YA Crime; criminology
- Notable work: Halland Suite
- Notable awards: Best Swedish Crime Novel Award (2013, 2023); Glass Key award (2024)

Christoffer Carlsson (born August 28, 1986, in Halmstad) is a Swedish criminologist and writer, best known for the crime novels about Leo Junker (2013–2017) and the ongoing Halland Suite (Hallandsviten).

== Biography ==
Christoffer Carlsson was born and raised near Lake Toftasjön, Marbäck, ten miles outside Halmstad. He moved to Stockholm in 2005 to study criminology at Stockholm University and got a PhD in criminology in the spring of 2014. He is active at the Institute for Futures Studies and the department of criminology at Stockholm University, where he is associate professor/reader.

In 2019, he received Stockholm University's Award for Good Teaching (Årets lärare) a prize that since 1992 can be given to teachers who "promote students' learning through outstanding pedagogical efforts, recognized interest and commitment to the development of teaching, and recognized teaching skills".

His thesis, Continuities and Changes in Criminal Careers, addresses the question of why people stop committing crimes. In 2012 he received The European Society of Criminology Young Criminologist Award for the article Using ‘Turning Points’ to Understand Processes of Change in Offending: Notes from a Swedish Study on Life Courses and Crime, published in the British Journal of Criminology.

Carlsson appears relatively regularly in the Swedish media, in debates about crime and punishment. In the spring of 2016, Carlsson wrote a research report on exit processes from violent extremism, published by the Institute for Futures Studies.

== Writing ==
The novel Fallet Vincent Franke ("The Vincent Franke case"), Carlsson's debut, was published in 2010, when he was 23 years old. His third novel, Den osynlige mannen från Salem ("The Invisible man from Salem"), won the Best Swedish Crime Novel Award in 2013 when he was 27 years old, making him the youngest ever recipient of the prize. The last part in the Leo Junker series, Den tunna blå linjen ("The Thin Blue Line"), was nominated for the Best Swedish Crime Novel Award in 2017. The series about Leo Junker is published in 20 countries, and the film rights have been sold.

His first novel for young people, Oktober är den kallaste månaden ("October is the coldest month"), was awarded Spårhunden ("The Bloodhound"), the Swedish Crime Writers' Academy's prize for the year's best Swedish children's and youth crime fiction, 2016.

After the end of the Leo Junker series in the spring of 2017, Carlsson began work on a new crime novel. Järtecken (Under the Storm) was released in March 2019. The book is regarded as Carlsson's definitive breakthrough, was described as "a perfect novel about a crime" and shortly afterwards was nominated for Book of the Year 2019. In autumn of 2019, the Swedish Crime Writers' Academy announced that Järtecken was one of five titles nominated for the award for the Best Swedish Crime Novel Award. The sequel, Brinn mig en sol (Blaze Me a Sun), was released in March 2021 and deals with the murder of Olof Palme. During the year the book achieved great sales success, was nominated for Book of the Year and was described as one of the year's best crime novels. In the spring of 2023, the third part, Levande och döda (The Living and the Dead), was released. Levande och döda was also nominated for Book of the Year (2023) and in December 2023 received the Best Swedish Crime Novel Award. In June 2024, Levande och döda was named the winner of the Glass Key award, the prize for the best Nordic crime novel of the year.

== Selected works ==
=== Criminology ===
- An Introduction to Life-Course Criminology (2016) by Christoffer Carlsson, Jerzy Sarnecki
- Delinquency and drift revisited : the criminology of David Matza and beyond (2019) by Thomas Blomberg, Frank T. Cullen, Christoffer Carlson, Cheryl Lero Jonson, editors.

=== YA Crime ===
- Oktober är den kallaste månaden (2016), October is the Coldest Month (2017)

=== Leo Junker series ===
- Den osynlige mannen från Salem (2013), The invisible man from Salem (2015)
- Den fallande detektiven (2014), The falling detective (2016)
- Mästare, väktare, lögnare, vän (2015), Master, liar, traitor, friend (2017)
- Den tunna blå linjen (2017), The thin blue line (2018)

=== Halland Suite ===
- Järtecken (2019), Under the storm (2024)
- Brinn mig en sol (2021), Blaze me a sun (2023)
- Levande och döda (2021), The Living and the Dead (2025)
- En liten droppe blod (2025)
