= Johan Theorin =

Swedish journalist and author

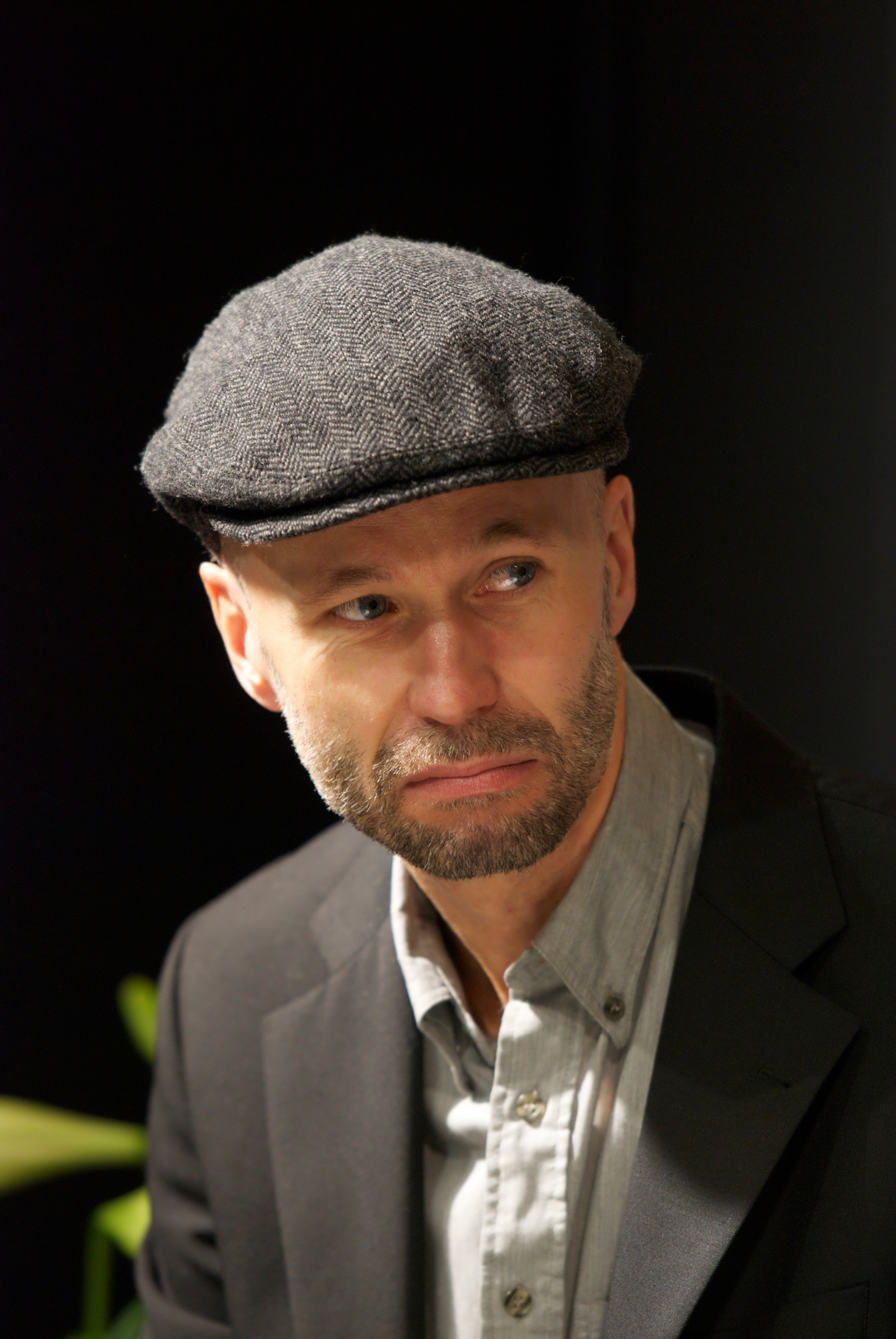
Johan Theorin (2011)

Johan Theorin (born in 1963 Gothenburg) is a Swedish journalist and author. Throughout his life, Johan Theorin has been a regular visitor to the island of Öland in the Baltic Sea. His mother’s family—sailors, fishermen and stone cutters—have lived there for centuries, nurturing the island’s legacy of supernatural tales and folklore.

Echoes from the Dead (originally published in Sweden as Skumtimmen by Wahlström & Widstrand) is Theorin’s first novel. In 2007 it was voted Best First Mystery Novel by the authors and critics of the Swedish Crime Writers' Academy, it has been translated into twenty five languages and was made into a Swedish feature film in 2013. His second novel, The Darkest Room, (in Swedish Nattfåk) was voted the Best Swedish Crime Novel of 2008, won the Glass Key award in 2009 and was also awarded the 2010 CWA International Dagger. The Quarry, was published by Transworld Publishers in 2011. Concluding with The Voices Beyond in 2015, the books form a loose quartet of novels set on the island of Öland. A stand-alone suspense novel, The Asylum, was published in 2013.

He now resides on Öland and in Stockholm.

== Bibliography ==
- Echoes from the Dead, Doubleday, 2008, translated by Marlaine Delargy (Swedish title Skumtimmen, 2007)
- The Darkest Room, Doubleday, 2009, (Swedish title Nattfåk, 2008)
- The Quarry, (Transworld 2011, Swedish title Blodläge, 2010)
- The Asylum (Transworld 2013, Swedish title Sankta Psyko, 2011)
- The Voices Beyond, (Transworld 2015, Swedish title Rörgast (2013)

== Awards and Prizes ==
- Echoes from the Dead voted Best First Mystery Novel 2007 by the authors and critics of the Swedish Academy of Crime Writers
- "Endast jag är vaken" (published in Schakt) awarded the Catahya Award for best Swedish science fiction, fantasy or horror short story 2007
- The Darkest Room voted Best Swedish Crime Novel 2008 by the Swedish Academy of CrimeWriters
- The Darkest Room awarded the Glass Key Award in 2009
- Echoes from the Dead awarded the CWA John Creasey (New Blood) Dagger at the 2009 Crime Thriller Awards.
- The Darkest Room awarded the CWA International Dagger in July 2010.
