= Camilla Grebe =

Swedish writer (born 1968)

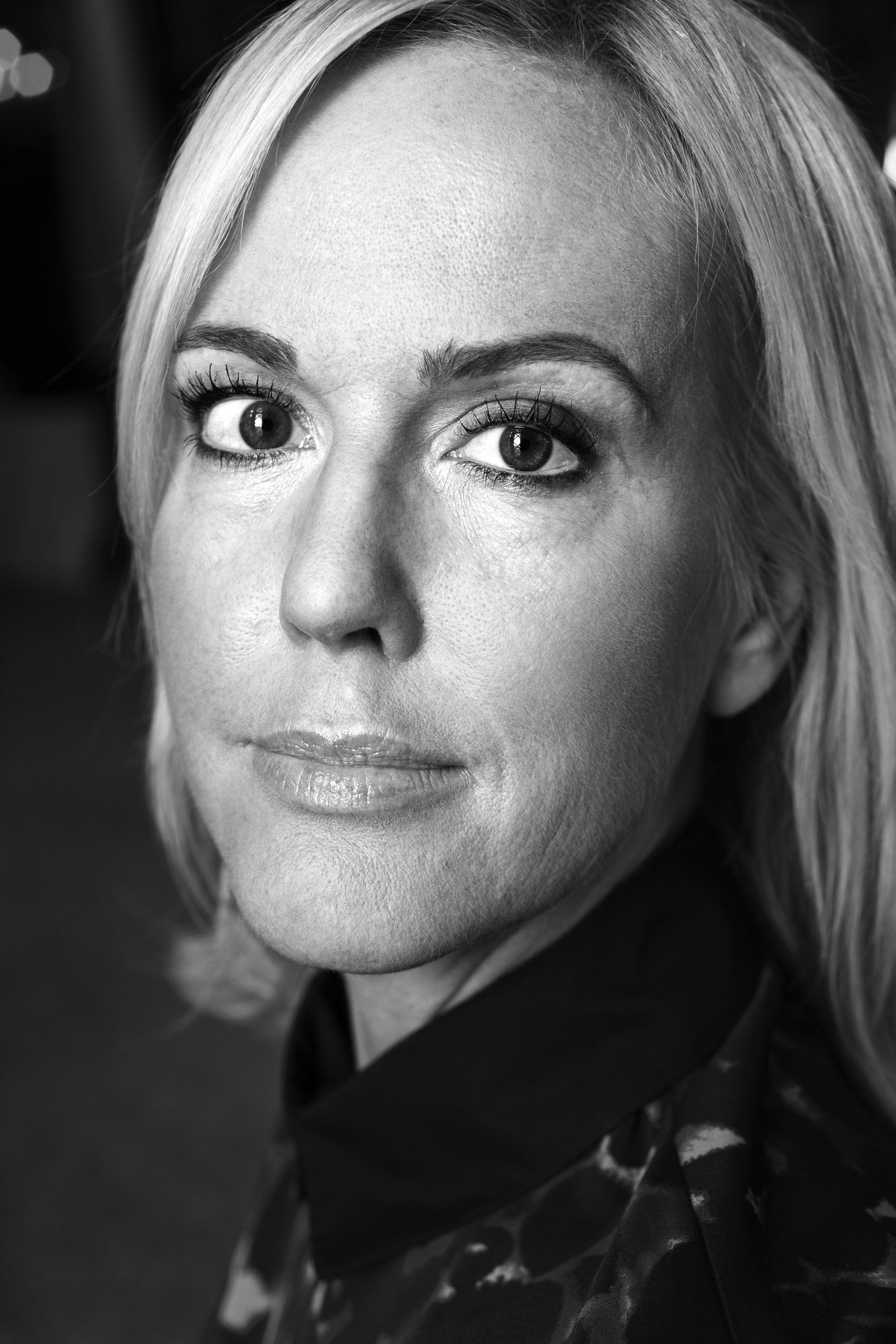
- Born: March 20, 1968 (age 58); Älvsjö, Sweden
- Writing career
- Genre: crime fiction

Camilla Grebe (born 1968) is a Swedish writer. She is a recipient of the Best Swedish Crime Novel Award and the Glass Key award.

== Biography ==
She was born in Älvsjö, 1968. She holds a degree from Stockholm School of Economics. She was co-founder of the audiobook publishing firm Storyside and served as its CEO. With her sister Åsa Träff, she published a series of popular crime novels featuring psychologist Siri Bergman, two of which were nominated for Best Swedish Crime Novel of the Year by the Swedish Crime Writers' Academy. She also co-authored a trilogy with Paul Leander-Engström. In 2015, she published The Ice Beneath Her, her first novel as sole author; it was followed by After She's Gone in 2017, which won the Best Swedish Crime Novel Award as well as the Glass Key award. She lives in Stockholm.

In 2020, a film adaptation of The Ice Beneath Her was announced, with Daisy Ridley in talks for the lead role.

== Selected works ==
- Någon sorts frid with Åsa Träff (2009) translated as Some kind of peace (2012)
- Bittrare än döden with Åsa Träff (2010) translated as More bitter than death (2013)
- Innan du dog with Åsa Träff (2012) translated as Before You Died
- Mannen utan hjärta with Åsa Träff (2013) translated as The Man Without a Heart
- Dirigenten från Sankt Petersburg with Paul Leander-Engström (2013) translated as The Conductor from Saint Petersburg - the TV adaptation of this was called Moscow Noir.
- Handlaren från Omsk with Paul Leander-Engström (2014) translated as The Merchant from Omsk
- Eld och djupa vatten with Åsa Träff (2015) translated as Through Fire and Water
- Den sovande spionen with Paul Leander-Engström (2016)
