= Åsa Larsson =

Swedish crime-fiction writer

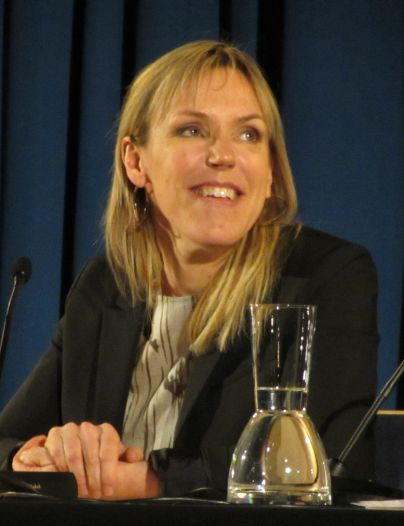
- Åsa Larsson at the 2013 literary festival in Cologne
- Born: Åsa Elena Larsson; Uppsala, Sweden
- Occupation: Novelist
- Writing career
- Period: 2003–2013
- Genre: Crime fiction
- Notable works: Sun Storm; The Blood Spilt; The Black Path; Until Thy Wrath be Past; The Second Deadly Sin

Åsa Larsson is a Swedish crime-fiction writer, with her novels featuring Rebecka Martinsson. Her books and characters serve as the basis for the internationally successful TV series Rebecka Martinsson. The 2007 Swedish film Solstorm was based on the book The Savage Altar.

== Early life and education ==
Åsa Elena Larsson was born in Uppsala, but raised in Kiruna in the far north of Sweden. She is the granddaughter of the Olympic skier Erik August Larsson.

Prior to becoming a full-time writer, Larsson was a tax lawyer.

== Writing career ==
Larsson wrote a series of crime novels featuring the heroine Rebecka Martinsson, a tax lawyer.

Her first Rebecka Martinsson novel, Solstorm, was awarded the Swedish Crime Writers' Academy prize for best first novel. It was published in the UK under the title The Savage Altar and was shortlisted for the Duncan Lawrie International Dagger.

Her second Rebecka Martinsson novel, Det blod som spillts, won the Best Swedish Crime Novel Award.

Till offer åt Molok, her fifth Rebecka Martinsson novel, also won the Best Swedish Crime Novel Award. The sixth and final part, Fädernas misgärningar, was published in autumn 2021 and was also awarded the prize for the Best Swedish Crime Novel of the year.

== Adaptations ==
Larsson's books and characters serve as the basis for the Swedish TV series Rebecka Martinsson.

The 2007 Swedish film Solstorm was based on the book The Savage Altar.

== Bibliography ==
=== Rebecka Martinsson novels ===
- 2003 – Solstorm; English translation: Sun Storm (USA), The Savage Altar (UK), 2006
- 2004 – Det blod som spillts; English translation: The Blood Spilt, 2007
- 2006 – Svart stig; English translation: The Black Path, 2008
- 2008 – Till dess din vrede upphör; English translation: Until Thy Wrath be Past, 2011
- 2011 – Till offer åt Molok; English translation: The Second Deadly Sin, 2014
- 2021 – Fädernas missgärningar; English translation: The Sins of Our Fathers, 2021

=== Other ===
- 2003 – Upptäck jorden
- 2005 - Aurinkomyrsky
- 2007 – Systrarna Hietala (short stories)
- 2009 – Guds starka arm (with Lena Andersson) (short stories)
- 2012 – Tjernaja tropa
