= Kjell Eriksson =

Swedish author

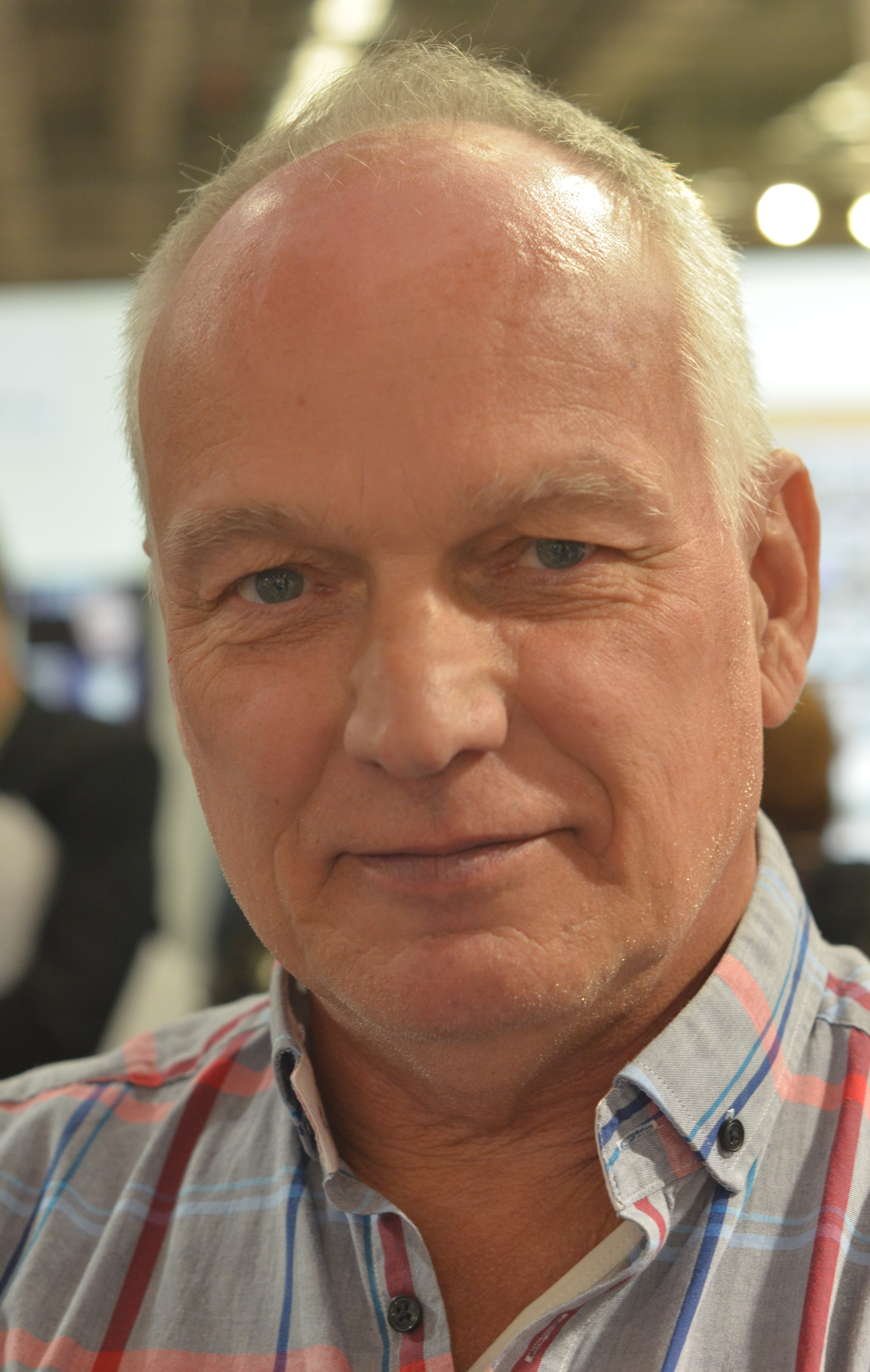
- Kjell Eriksson in 2013.
- Born: 1953 (age 72–73); Uppsala
- Occupation: Novelist
- Writing career
- Genre: Crime fiction

'Kjell Sylve Eriksson (born 1953 in Uppsala) is a Swedish writer, author of the detective chief inspector Ann Lindell crime novels. Den upplysta stigen (“Shining path”), the first of the Lindell series, was named Best First Novel of 1999 by the Swedish Crime Academy. Prinsessan av Burundi (The Princess of Burundi), fourth in the series, was awarded the Swedish Crime Writers' Academy Best Swedish Crime Novel Award in 2002. Öppen grav (Open Grave), published in 2009, was the tenth and final novel in the series. Currently only eight Lindell novels are available in English, though St. Martin's Press has the rights to the whole series.

== Bibliography ==
- Knäppgöken (1993)
- Frihetsgrisen (1995)
- Efter statarna-en ny tid (1995)

=== Ann Lindell series ===
- Den upplysta stigen (“Shining path”) (1999)
- Jorden må rämna (2000)
- Stenkistan (2001) translated by Ebba Segerberg as Stone Coffin (2016)
- Prinsessan av Burundi (2002) translated by Ebba Segerberg as The Princess of Burundi (2007)
- Nattskärran (2003)
- Nattens grymma stjärnor (2004) translated by Ebba Segerberg as The Cruel Stars of the Night (2008)
- Mannen från bergen (2004) translated by Ebba Segerberg as The Demon of Dakar (2009)
- Den hand som skälver (2007) translated by Ebba Segerberg as The Hand that Trembles (2011)
- Svarta lögner, rött blod (2008) translated by Paul Norlen as Black Lies, Red Blood (2014)
- Öppen grav (2009) translated by Paul Norlen as Open Grave (2015)
- Den skrattande hazaren (2020) translated by Paul Norlen as The Night of the Fire (2020)
- Dödsuret (2021) translated by Paul Norlen as The Deathwatch Beetle (2021)
