= Åke Edwardson =

Swedish author

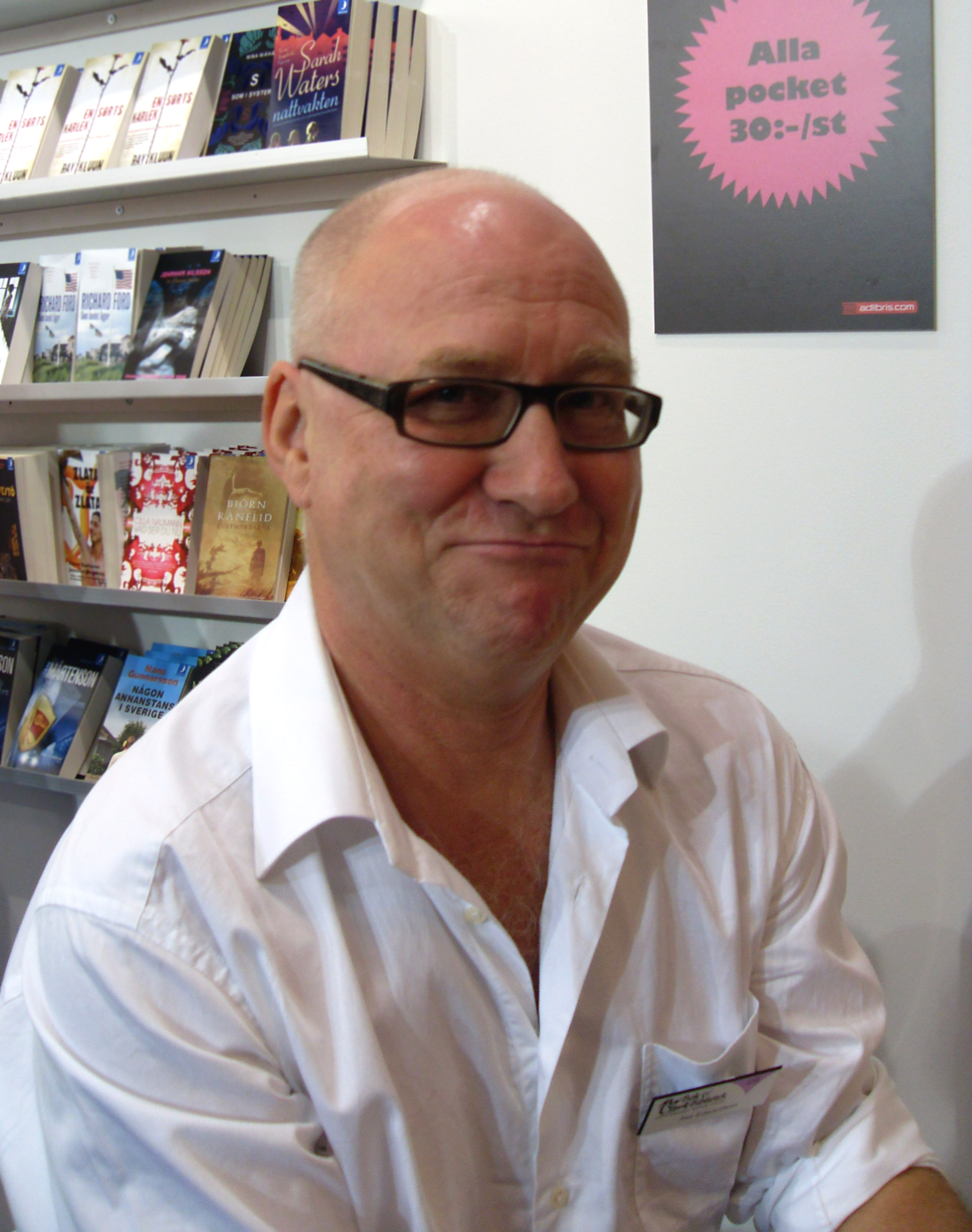
- Gothenburg book fair 2008
- Born: 10 March 1953 (age 73); Eksjö, Småland, Sweden
- Writing career
- Genres: Crime fiction, Children's books

Åke Edwardson (born 10 March 1953 in Eksjö, Småland) is a Swedish author of detective fiction, and was previously a lecturer in journalism at University of Gothenburg, the city where many of his Inspector Winter novels are set. Edwardson has had many jobs, including as a journalist and press officer for the United Nations and his crime novels have made him a three-time winner of the Swedish Crime Writers' Academy Award for best crime novel. His first novel to be translated into English, in 2005, was Sun and Shadow. The second, Never End, followed in 2006. In a Spiegel Online interview on 21 June 2008, Edwardson declared that he would not write any more crime novels after 10 episodes about his protagonist Winter.

== Bibliography ==
- Till allt som varit dött (1995)
- Gå ut min själ (1996)
- Genomresa (1999)
- Jukebox (2003)
- Winterland (2004)
- Samurajsommar (2005) (young adult fiction)
- Rum nummer 10 (2005)
- Drakmånad (2006) (young adult fiction)
- Vänaste land (2006)
- Nästan död man (2007)
- Den sista vintern (2008)

=== Inspector Erik Winter series ===
- Dans med en ängel (1997) Erik Winter novel translated as 'Death Angels' by Ken Schubert (2009)
- Rop från långt avstånd (1998) Erik Winter novel translated as 'The Shadow Woman' by Per Carlsson (2010)
- Sun and Shadow: an Erik Winter novel (translated by Laurie Thompson) (Sol och skugga 1999)
- Never End: an Erik Winter novel (translated by Laurie Thompson) (Låt det aldrig ta slut, 2000)
- Frozen Tracks: an inspector Erik Winter novel (translated by Laurie Thompson) (Himlen är en plats på jorden 2001)
- Segel av sten (2002) Erik Winter novel, translated as 'Sail of Stone' (2012)
- Room No. 10: Erik Winter Series #7(2013)
