= Malin Persson Giolito =

Swedish author and lawyer (born 1969)

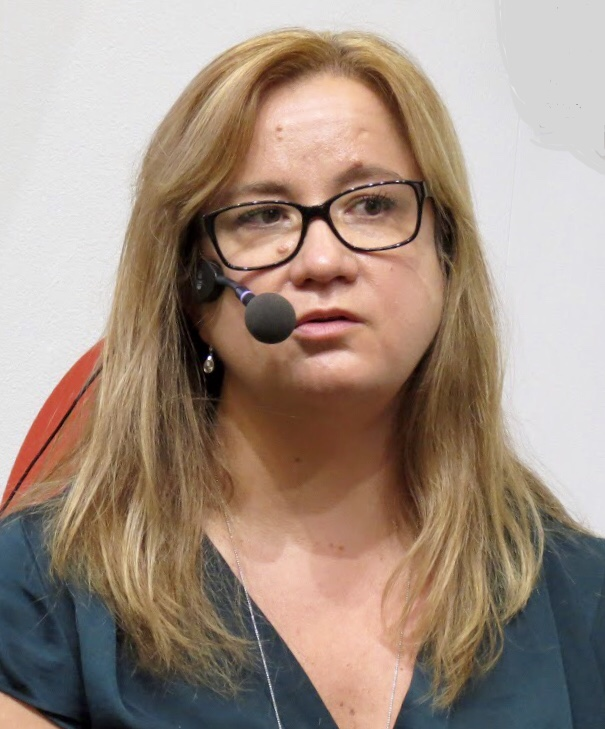
- Giolito in September 2016
- Born: Anna Malin Ulrika Persson Giolito; 25 September 1969 (age 56); Stockholm, Sweden
- Education: Uppsala University
- Occupations: Lawyer; author
- Years active: 1997–present
- Notable work: Störst av allt (Quicksand)
- Spouse: Christophe Giolito
- Children: 3
- Parent: Leif G. W. Persson (father)
- Website: malinperssongiolito.se

Anna Malin Ulrika Persson Giolito (born 25 September 1969 in Stockholm) is a Swedish author and lawyer. She is the daughter of novelist and criminologist, Leif G. W. Persson. Persson Giolito wrote the award-winning book Störst av allt (Quicksand) which has won the awards for Best Swedish Crime Novel in 2016, Glass Key Award in 2017 and the Prix du Polar Européen in 2018.

== Early life ==
Malin Persson Giolito was born 25 September 1969 in Stockholm, Sweden to novelist and criminologist, Leif G. W. Persson and Birgitta Liedstrand. She grew up in Djursholm, Sweden.

== Career ==
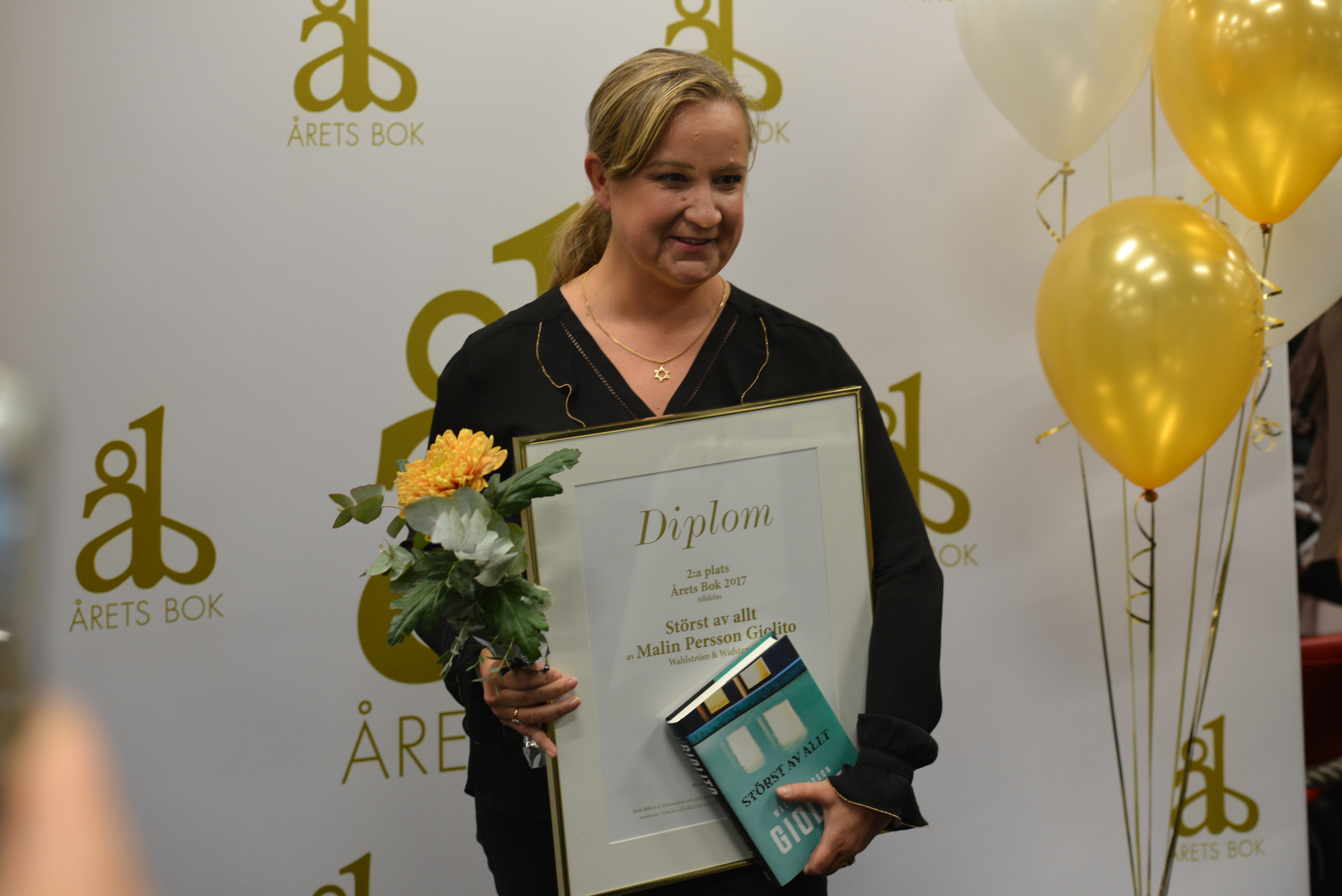
Malin Persson Giolito at the award ceremony of "Bonnier's Book Clubs' Book of the Year Award" at the Gothenburg Book Fair on September 29, 2017, where she reached 2nd place with her book Störst av allt.

Persson Giolito graduated from Uppsala University in 1994 and initially worked at the European Court of Justice in Luxembourg. She earned a master's degree in European law from the College of Europe in Bruges, Belgium. She has also studied at Stockholm University in Sweden and at the Université catholique de l'Ouest in France.

From 1997 to 2007, Persson Giolito was employed by the law firm Mannheimer Swartling but left when she was expecting her third child. In 2008, she worked as a lawyer in competition law at the European Commission in Brussels and begin writing novels with her first, Dubbla slag, being published by Piratförlaget.

Since 2015, Persson Giolito is a full-time author and lives in Brussels with her family, she also writes for the magazine, Amelia, where she discusses literature.

On July 5, 2017, Persson Giolito hosted the Sommar program on Sveriges Radio P1.

=== Writing ===
Persson Giolito writing debut began in 2008 with the novel Dubbla slag. The debut was followed in 2010 with the thriller novel Bara ett barn and in 2012 with Bortom varje rimligt tvivel. In 2016, the multi-award-winning thriller Störst av allt was published.

In September 2017, it was announced that Netflix had ordered an adaption of Störst av allt (Quicksand) to be developed into an eponymous crime drama series, Quicksand (Störst av allt), and would partner with FLX to produce the series. The series premiered on April 5, 2019.

Her latest book "I dina händer" was released in 2022. In April 2024, Netflix released a mini-series, titled Deliver Me, based on the novel.

== Bibliography ==
Year	Title	Publisher	ISBN	Pages	Note
2008	Dubbla slag	Piratförlaget	978-9-146-23462-3	380	Currently published by Wahlström & Widstrand
2010	Bara ett barn	Piratförlaget	978-9-146-23461-6	371	Currently published by Wahlström & Widstrand
2012	Bortom varje rimligt tvivel (Beyond All Reasonable Doubt)	Piratförlaget	978-9-146-23459-3	453	Currently published by Wahlström & Widstrand
2016	Störst av allt (Quicksand)	Wahlström & Widstrand	978-9-146-23241-4	367	
2018	Processen	Bonnier Bookery	978-9-188-70405-4	70	
2022	Deliver Me (I dina händer)				

== Filmography ==
=== Adaptations ===
- Quicksand (Störst av allt) — Netflix Original & FLX (2019)
- Deliver Me — Netflix (2024)

== Awards ==
Year	Nominee/work	Award	Result	Ref.
2016	Störst av allt (Quicksand)	Best Swedish Crime Novel Award (Swedish Crime Writers' Academy)	Won	
2017	Störst av allt (Quicksand)	Bonnier's Book Clubs' Book of the Year Award	2nd Place	
2017	Störst av allt (Quicksand)	Glass Key Award (Scandinavian Criminal Society)	Won	
2018	Störst av allt (Quicksand)	Prix du Polar Européen (European Crime Fiction Prize)	Won	
2018	Störst av allt (Quicksand)	Best Scandinavian Crime Novel of the Year (Petrona Award)	Won	
