= Ranum (surname) =

Ranum is a surname of Norwegian or Danish origin. Notable people with the surname include:

- Edith Ranum (1922–2002), Norwegian crime fiction writer, novelist and playwright
- Jane Ranum (born 1947), American politician
- Marcus J. Ranum (born 1962), American computer and network security researcher
- Roy W. Ranum (1898–1990), American politician
