= Tvedt =

Tvedt is a surname. Notable people with the surname include:

- Birger Tvedt (1910–2002), Norwegian sports medical and physiotherapist
- Chris Tvedt (born 1954), Norwegian lawyer and crime fiction writer
- Jens Tvedt (1857–1935), Norwegian novelist and short story writer
- Jon Tvedt (1966–2009), Norwegian orienteering competitor and athlete
- Knut Tvedt (1906–1989), Norwegian director and jurist
- Knut Are Tvedt (born 1952), Norwegian encyclopedist
- Nils Tvedt (1883–1965), Norwegian diver
- Terje Tvedt (born 1951), Norwegian academic, author and documentary film maker
- Tom Tvedt (born 1968), Norwegian politician
