= Vallgren =

Vallgren is a surname. Notable people with the surname include:

- Carl-Johan Vallgren (born 1964), Swedish author, singer and musician
- Ville Vallgren (1855–1940), Finnish sculptor
