= The Blood Spilt =

2004 novel by Åsa Larsson

- First edition (Swedish)
- Author: Åsa Larsson
- Original title: Det blod som spillts
- Translator: Marlaine Delargy
- Language: Swedish
- Series: Rebecka Martinsson, #2
- Genre: Crime fiction
- Publisher: Delacorte (USA), Viking (UK)
- Publication date: 2004
- Publication place: Sweden
- English publication date: January 30, 2007 (USA), April 2008 (UK)
- Media type: Print (hardback & paperback)
- Pages: 341pp (USA ed.)
- ISBN: 0-385-33982-8
- OCLC: 70335423
- Dewey Decimal: 839.73/8 22
- LC Class: PT9877.22.A78 B56 2007
- Preceded by: Sun Storm
- Followed by: The Black Path

The Blood Spilt (Swedish: Det blod som spillts, 2004) is a crime novel by Swedish writer Åsa Larsson, the second in the Rebecka Martinsson series. It was published in the US in January 2007 and in the UK in 2008. It received the Best Swedish Crime Novel Award of 2004.
