= Torkil Damhaug =

Norwegian physician and writer

- Born: 8 November 1958 (age 67); Lillehammer, Norway
- Occupations: Crime fiction writer Physician
- Notable work: Ildmannen (2011); En femte årstid (2016); Hund uten grav (2022)
- Awards: Riverton Prize (2011, 2016, 2022)

Torkil Damhaug (born 8 November 1958) is a Norwegian physician and crime fiction writer. He has been awarded the Riverton Prize three times, in 2011, 2016, and 2022, and is the first person to receive the prize three times.

== Personal life and education ==
Born in Lillehammer on 8 November 1958, Damhaug is a physician by education, and has specialized in psychiatry. He studied literary science and social anthropology at the University of Bergen, 1982–1983, and graduated as physician from the University of Oslo in 1991. His specialization in psychiatry was approved in 2006.

== Literary career ==
Having started penning his first novel while still a medical student, Damhaug made his literary debut in 1996 with Flykt, måne. The protagonist Anna Siboulet, a psychiatrist, is faced with the challenge of helping a young man who was found unconscious and unable to tell who he is. Damhaug followed up with the novels Syk rose (1999), Overlord (2006), and Se meg, Medusa in 2007.

His literary breakthrough was Døden ved vann from 2008. He was awarded the Riverton Prize for Ildmannen in 2011. Later books are the crime novel Sikre tegn på din død from 2013 and the thriller En femte årstid from 2016. En femte årstid is described as a psychological thriller, and was awarded the Riverton Prize for 2016.

In 2017 Damhaug published the psychological thriller Glasshjerte. His next book was Se en annen vei from 2019, a psychological thriller set in Budapest. His novel Hund uten grav (2022) contains elements such as net trolls and metoo, and earned him his third Riverton Prize. He is the first person who has received the prize three times.

His novel Forræderen (The traitor) from 2024 is set in Bergen in 1979. The protagonist is a medical student co-living with protesters and substance experimenters, trying to liberate themselves from demands and expectations. Parts of the novel are written in poetic prose.
