= Unni Lindell =

Norwegian writer (born 1957)

Unni Lindell Sold 8 million books, translated to 19 languages.
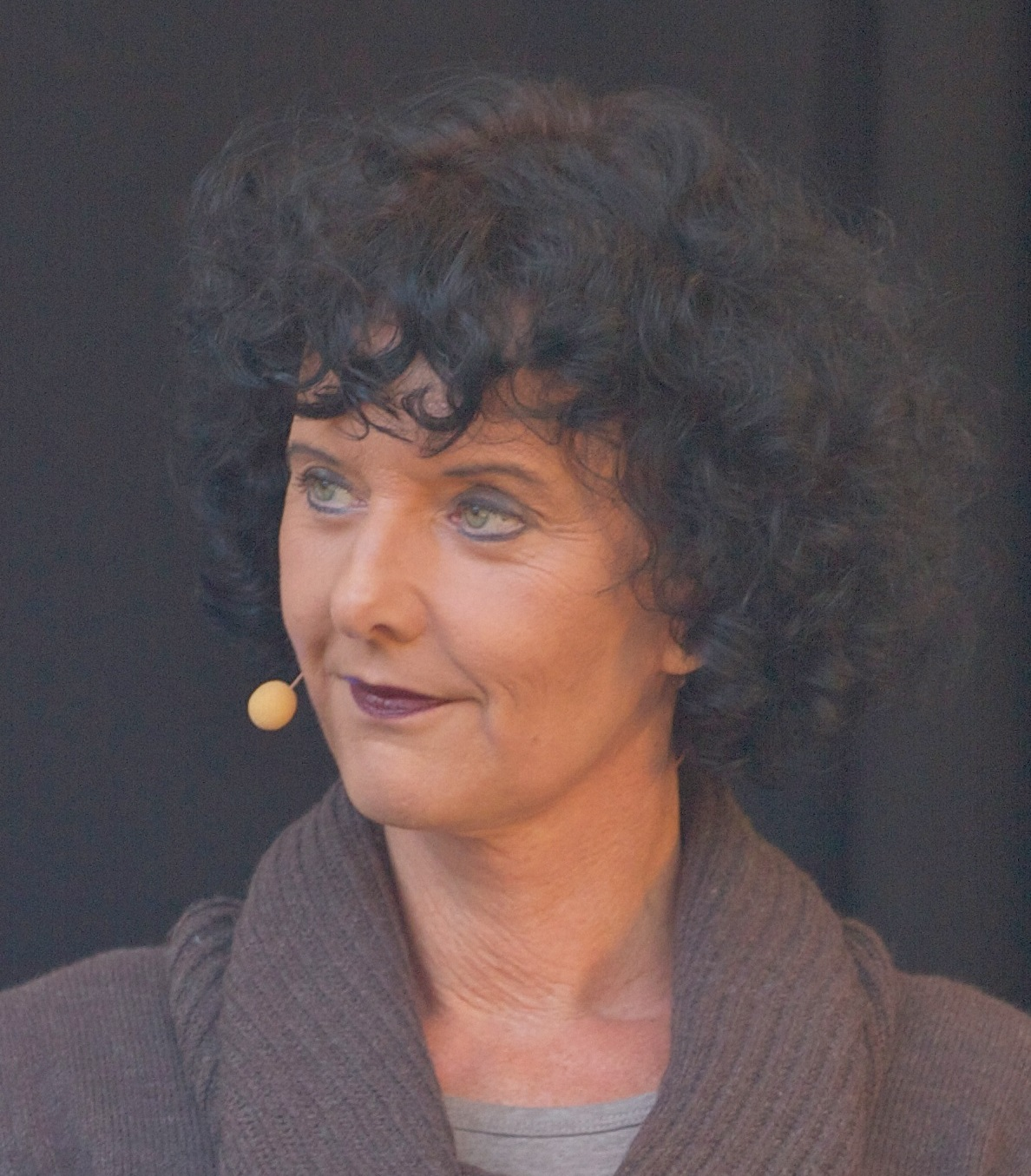
- Unni Lindell at the Oslo Bookfestival in 2010.
- Born: Unni Maria Lindell; 3 April 1957 (age 69); Oslo, Norway
- Occupation: Writer
- Spouse: Per Christian Garnæs
- Writing career
- Period: 1986–present
- Genres: Youth, humour, novels, poems, young adult

Unni Maria Lindell (born 3 April 1957 in Oslo) is a Norwegian writer. She is best known for her whodunits crime novels, but has also written a collection of poems and several books for children and young adults.

Lindell worked as a journalist before she became an author. Her first book Den grønne dagen ("The green day") was published in 1986. One of Lindell's most prominent characters is detective Cato Isaksen. Some of the Isaksen books have been adapted as TV films starring Reidar Sørensen.

Lindell was awarded the Mads Wiel Nygaards Endowment in 1998 and the Critics' Prize for the year's best children's or youth literature. In 1999 and in 2018 she received the Riverton Prize (Rivertonprisen), a literature award given annually to the best Norwegian detective story.

== Bibliography ==
- Den grønne dagen – youth literature (1986)
- Kongen er pappaen til to tvillinger som heter Gro og Kåre – humour (1987)
- Hemmeligheten i sirkuset – children's literature (1988)
- Henrik Vipsen og hans bifokale onkel som er født i fiskebollens tegn – humour (1988)
- Bursdag – idebok (1989)
- Fire dager til fullmåne – children's literature (1990)
- Vi lager jul – concept book (1990)
- Gamle damer legger ikke egg – humour (1991) (illustrated by Inge Grødum)
- Annas barn – youth literature (1991)
- Fuglefangeren – youth literature (1992)
- Skjelettet er et stativ som man kan henge fra seg kroppen på – humor (1992)
- Rosamunde Harpiks, den lille heksen med de store ørene – children's literature (1993)
- Norges første statsminister het Tor med hammeren – humour (1993)
- En grusom kvinnes bekjennelser – novel (1993)
- Sugemerket – youth literature (1994)
- Alene hjemme – short stories (1994)
- To fruer i en smekk – humor (1995) (together with Anne B. Ragde)
- Jens Bånn, den lille spionen – children's literature (1995)
- Min fars kjole er rød som reven – poetry (1995)
- Grisen er dekket av svinepels – (1996) (illustrated by Eldbjørg Ribe)
- Det er alltid for tidlig å stå opp. Libresser, første bind – humour (1996) (together with Anne B. Ragde)
- Slangebæreren – crime novel (1996), filmed
- Jesus gikk på vannet fordi han ikke ville bli våt på beina – humour (1997) (illustrated by Eldbjørg Ribe)
- Den lille dameboken. Libresser i utvalg – humour (1997) (together with Anne B. Ragde)
- Regjeringen bestemmer hvordan været skal bli – humour (1998) (illustrated by Inge Grødum)
- Måneorkesteret – novel (1998)
- Sjefen bestemmer over Gud og Hermann! – humour (1999) (illustrated by Eldbjørg Ribe)
- Pinocchios nye reise – children's literature (1999) (illustrated by Akin Düzakin)
- Drømmefangeren – crime novel (1999), filmed
- Sørgekåpen – crime novel (2000), filmed
- Å være engel er et typisk kvinneyrke – humour (2000) (illustrated by Eldbjørg Ribe)
- En familie består av 4 hoder, 8 armer og 8 bein – humour (2001) (illustrated by Mai Lindberg)
- Prinsesser er rosa om dagen og sorte om natten – humour (2002) (illustrated by Mai Lindberg)
- Nattsøsteren – crime novel (2002), filmed
- I Afrika er snøen svart – humour (2003) (illustrated by Bo Gaustad)
- Pass opp! Her kommer Gud og hun er en katt – photo and prose (2003) (photo with Nina Reistad)
- Rødhette – crime novel (2004)
- Kjære Gud jeg har det godt har du noe ull – humour (2005) (together with Mark Levengood, illustrated by Christina Alvner)
- Orkestergraven – crime novel (2005), filmed
- Krokodiller snakker ikke norsk – children's literature (2006)
- Honningfellen – crime novel (2007) Filmed in 2008 with Per Olav Sørensen
- To fruer i én smekk – rir igjen – humour (2007) (together with Anne B. Ragde)
- Elsker deg av hele mitt hjerte - children's literature (2008)
- Mørkemannen – crime novel (2008)
- Nifse Nella og nattskolen – children's literature (2008) (illustrated by Fredrik Skavlan)
- Rødt for kjærlighet – children's literature (2009)
- Sukkerdøden – crime novel (2010)
- Djevelkysset – crime novel (2012)
- Brudekisten – crime novel (2014)
- Jeg vet hvor du bor – crime novel (2016)
- Dronen – crime novel (2018)

(The Rivertonprize second time)

- Nabovarsel crime novel Strawberry publishing 2020
- Fremmedlegeme, crime novel, Bonniers publishing house 2022
- Dukken i tauet (The doll in the rope) crime novel, Bonniers publishing house 2024
