= Michael Grundt Spang =

Norwegian journalist and writer (1931–2003)

Michael Grundt Spang (14 June 1931 – 13 November 2003) was a Norwegian journalist, crime reporter and crime fiction writer. He worked as a journalist for the newspaper Dagbladet from 1955, and for Verdens Gang from 1970. His novel Operasjon V for vanvidd from 1968 was the basis for a film from 1970. He was awarded the Riverton Prize in 1985 for his crime novel Spionen som lengtet hjem (English: The Spy Who Longed for Home).
