= Glass Key award =

Nordic crime literature award

The Glass Key award (Swedish: Glasnyckeln, Danish: Glasnøglen, Norwegian: Glassnøkkelen, Finnish: Lasiavain-palkinto, Icelandic: Glerlykillinn) is a literature award given annually to a crime novel by an author from the Nordic countries.

The award, named after the novel The Glass Key by American crime writer Dashiell Hammett, is a real glass key given every year by the members of the Crime Writers of Scandinavia (Skandinaviska Kriminalsällskapet) to a crime novel written by a Danish, Finnish, Icelandic, Norwegian or Swedish author. Each country's members put forth a candidate novel, making up the shortlist.

== Winners ==
Year	Author	Original title	English translation	Country
1992	Henning Mankell	Mördare utan ansikte	Faceless Killers	Sweden
1993	Peter Høeg	Frøken Smillas fornemmelse for sne	Miss Smilla's Feeling for Snow	Denmark
1994	Kim Småge	Sub Rosa	n/a	Norway
1995	Erik Otto Larsen	Masken i spejlet	lit. The mask in the mirror	Denmark
1996	Fredrik Skagen	Nattsug	lit. Night cravings	Norway
1997	Karin Fossum	Se dig ikke tilbake!	Don't Look Back	Norway
1998	Jo Nesbø	Flaggermusmannen	The Bat	Norway
1999	Leif Davidsen	Limes billede	Lime's Photograph	Denmark
2000	Håkan Nesser	Carambole	Hour of the Wolf	Sweden
2001	Karin Alvtegen	Saknad	Missing	Sweden
2002	Arnaldur Indriðason	Mýrin	Jar City	Iceland
2003	Arnaldur Indriðason	Grafarþögn	Silence of the Grave	Iceland
2004	Kurt Aust	Hjemsøkt	lit. Haunted	Norway/ Denmark
2005	Anders Roslund & Börge Hellström	Odjuret	The Beast / Pen 33	Sweden
2006	Stieg Larsson	Män som hatar kvinnor	The Girl with the Dragon Tattoo	Sweden
2007	Matti Rönkä	Ystävät kaukana	lit. Friends far away	Finland
2008	Stieg Larsson	Luftslottet som sprängdes	The Girl Who Kicked the Hornets' Nest	Sweden
2009	Johan Theorin	Nattfåk	The Darkest Room	Sweden
2010	Jussi Adler-Olsen	Flaskepost fra P	A Conspiracy of Faith	Denmark
2011	Leif G. W. Persson	Den döende detektiven	The Dying Detective	Sweden
2012	Erik Valeur	Det syvende barn	The Seventh Child	Denmark
2013	Jørn Lier Horst	Jakthundene	The Hunting Dogs	Norway
2014	Gard Sveen	Den siste pilegrimen	The Last Pilgrim	Norway
2015	Thomas Rydahl	Eremitten	The Hermit	Denmark
2016	Ane Riel	Harpiks	Resin	Denmark
2017	Malin Persson Giolito	Störst av allt	Quicksand	Sweden
2018	Camilla Grebe	Husdjuret	After She's Gone	Sweden
2019	Stina Jackson	Silvervägen	The Silver Road	Sweden
2020	Camilla Grebe	Skuggjägaren	lit. The Shadow hunter	Sweden
2021	Tove Alsterdal	Rotvälta	We Know You Remember	Sweden
2022	Morten Hesseldahl	Mørket under isen	lit. The Darkness under the ice	Denmark
2023	Max Seeck	Kauna	The Last Grudge	Finland
2024	Christoffer Carlsson	Levande och döda	lit. Living and dead	Sweden
2025	Eva Fretheim	Fuglekongen	lit. Goldcrest	Norway
