= Deliver Me (Swedish TV series) =

Swedish drama television miniseries

- Netflix poster
- Swedish: I dina händer
- Genre: Drama
- Based on: Deliver Me by Malin Persson Giolito
- Written by: Alex Haridi; Amanda Högberg
- Directed by: Anna Zackrisson
- Starring: Yasir Hassan; Olle Strand; Yusra Warsama; Ane Dahl Torp; Henrik Norlén; Ardalan Esmaili; Mahmut Suvakci; Solomon Njie; Abdirahman Mohamed
- Composer: Rebekka Karijord
- Country of origin: Sweden
- Original language: Swedish
- No. of episodes: 5

Production
- Executive producer: Astri von Arbin Ahlander
- Producers: Frida Asp; Fatima Varhos
- Cinematography: Andréas Lennartsson
- Editors: Malin Lindström; Elin Pröjts; Joakim Tessert-Ekström
- Running time: 38–48 minutes
- Production company: Asp Varhos

Original release
- Network: Netflix
- Release: 24 April 2024

Deliver Me (Swedish: I dina händer, lit. 'In Your Hands') is a 2024 Swedish drama television miniseries based on the novel of the same name by Malin Persson Giolito. It was released on Netflix on 24 April 2024.

== Premise ==
After a 14-year-old commits a horrible crime, the question of who bears responsibility is raised.

== Cast ==
- Yasir Hassan as Bilal "Billy" Ali
- Olle Strand as Dogge
- Yusra Warsama as Leila, Billy's mother
- Ane Dahl Torp as Jill, Dogge's mother
- Henrik Norlén as Teo, Dogge's father
- Ardalan Esmaili as Farid, a police officer
- Mahmut Suvakci as Sudden, a shopkeeper
- Solomon Njie as Mehdi Bah
- Abdirahman Mohamed as Tusse, Billy's younger brother

== Episodes ==
No.	Title	Duration	Original release date
1	"What Have You Done?" (Vad har du gjort?)	38 min	April 24, 2024
2	"Why Is My Son Dead?" (Varför är min son död?)	45 min	April 24, 2024
3	"You Haven't Helped Anyone Here" (Du har inte hjälpt någon här)	48 min	April 24, 2024
4	"In This Life You're a Grown-Up" (I det här livet är du vuxen)	45 min	April 24, 2024
5	"You Can't Protect Me" (Du kan inte skydda mig)	46 min	April 24, 2024

== Production ==
Production on the series began in early 2023 in Stockholm. Ahead of the series' premiere in 2024, author Malin Persson Giolito announced that she had removed her name from the production credits due to disagreements with screenwriter Alex Haridi.

The series' trailer was released on 18 March 2024.

== Reception ==
Oskar Gustavsson Klingenstierna of Filmtopp gave the series three out of five stars, calling it "scary and impactful," but questioning whether five episodes was necessary given its slow pace. Jonatan Blomberg of MovieZine also gave the series three out of five stars, but wished that it had more episodes to give more time to develop certain characters and backstories. Karolina Fjellborg of Aftonbladet gave the series three out of five stars, calling it "wistful, heavy and well played," but noting that the series could have used more backstory about Dogge's family and downward spiral. She wrote, "It is by no means bad, but it is obvious that a couple of links in the story are missing."
