= Gard Sveen =

Norwegian crime fiction writer (born 1969)

- Born: 8 March 1969 (age 57)
- Occupation: Crime fiction writer
- Awards: Riverton Prize (2013); Glass Key award (2014)

Gard Sveen (born 8 March 1969) is a Norwegian crime fiction writer. He is a recipient of the Riverton Prize and the Glass Key Award.

== Biography ==
Born on 8 March 1969, Sveen made his literary debut in 2013, with the crime novel Den siste pilegrimen. The novel introduces the police detective Tommy Bergmann. For Den siste pilegrimen, he was awarded the Riverton Prize in 2013, and the Glass Key award in 2014. In 2015 he wrote the crime novel Helvete åpent, again with Bergmann as protagonist. Further books about Tommy Bergmann are Blod i dans (2016), the espionage thriller Bjørnen (2018), and Drømmenes Gud (2019).

In 2022 he published the non-fiction work Spioner i krig, about Soviet agents in Norway during and after World War II.

In 2023 he introduced a new crime series with investigators Ulf Sommer and Agnete Ness as protagonists, starting with the novel En dag skal du dø (2023), and the sequel Messe for en morder (2024).

== Bibliography ==
- Den siste pilegrimen (2013)
- Helvete åpent (2015)
- Blod i dans (2016)
- Bjørnen (2018)
- Drømmenes Gud (2019)
- En dag skal du dø (2023)
- Messe for en morder (2024)
