= Solstorm =

2007 Swedish film by Leif Lindblom

- Swedish cover
- Directed by: Leif Lindblom
- Written by: Klas Abrahamsson; Jimmy Lagnefors
- Produced by: Lena Rehnberg
- Starring: Izabella Scorupco; Mikael Persbrandt; Suzanne Reuter
- Music by: Jimmy Lagnefors
- Release date: 2 November 2007
- Running time: 103 min
- Country: Sweden
- Language: Swedish

Solstorm (en: Sunstorm) is a Swedish thriller/drama film released in 2007. It was directed by Leif Lindblom and filmed in Kiruna, Sweden. The film is based on the novel Sun Storm (released in the UK as Savage) written by author Åsa Larsson and was released in cinema on November 2, 2007.

== Synopsis ==
Stockholm attorney Rebecka Martinsson receives a call from a childhood friend, telling her that her brother has been murdered inside a church in the village of Kurravaara outside Kiruna. Martinsson returns to her home town in Kiruna and gets involved in the search for the killer.

== Cast ==
- Izabella Scorupco - Rebecka Martinsson
- Maria Sundbom - Sanna Strandgård
- Saga Larsson - Lova Strandgård
- Sandra Engström - Sara Strandgård
- Mikael Persbrandt - Thomas Söderberg
- Suzanne Reuter - Kristina Strandgård
- Krister Henriksson - Olof Strandgård
- Jakob Eklund - Måns Wenngren
- André Sjöberg - Viktor Strandgård
- Lena B. Eriksson - Anna-Maria Mella
- Göran Forsmark - Sven-Erik Stålnacke
- Antti Reini - Vesa Larsson
