= Quicksand (Persson Giolito novel) =

2016 novel by Malin Persson Giolito

- First edition
- Author: Malin Persson Giolito
- Original title: Störst av allt
- Language: Swedish
- Genre: Thriller
- Publisher: Wahlström & Widstrand (Swedish edition); Other Press (English edition)
- Publication date: 7 July, 2016 (Swedish edition); 7 March, 2017 (English edition)
- Publication place: Sweden
- Pages: 512 (English edition)
- ISBN: 1590518578 (English edition)
- OCLC: 1026298978

Quicksand (Swedish: Störst av allt) is a novel by Malin Persson Giolito. It was originally published on 7 July, 2016 by Wahlström & Widstrand in Swedish. An English translation was published on 7 March, 2017 by Other Press. The plot centers on an 18 year old girl on trial for a school shooting.

== Reception ==
The book received the 2016 Best Swedish Crime Novel Award and the 2017 Glass Key award. Kirkus Reviews said that "Giolito gives us the unsettling monologue of a teenage girl as she works her way through her role in murder. It is a splendid work of fiction."

== Adaptation ==
In September 2017, it was announced that Netflix had ordered an adaptation of the novel to be developed into an eponymous series, Quicksand, and would partner with FLX to produce the series. The series premiered on April 5, 2019.
