= Until Thy Wrath Be Past =

2008 novel by Åsa Larsson

- First edition (Swedish)
- Author: Åsa Larsson
- Original title: Till dess din vrede upphör
- Translator: Laurie Thompson
- Language: Swedish
- Series: Rebecka Martinsson, #4
- Genre: Crime fiction
- Publisher: Bonnier (Sweden); SilverOak (English)
- Publication date: 2008
- Publication place: Sweden
- English publication date: 2011
- Media type: Print (hardback & paperback)
- Pages: 256p. (English)
- ISBN: 9789100118235 (Swedish); 9781402787164(English)
- Preceded by: The Black Path
- Followed by: The Second Deadly Sin

Until Thy Wrath Be Past (Swedish: Till dess din vrede upphör) is a 2008 crime novel by Swedish writer Åsa Larsson, the fourth in the Rebecka Martinsson series. It was published in the United States in 2011.

== Plot ==
Someone kills Wilma Persson and Simon Kyrö as they dive on a plane in Vittangijärvi. What kind of old secret have they got on the tracks? And who is prepared to murder anyone to prevent it from coming out? A murder investigation begins where police inspector Anna-Maria Mella is threatened and Chamber Prosecutor Rebecka Martinsson is visited by the dead.
