= Stina Jackson =

Swedish writer (born 1983)

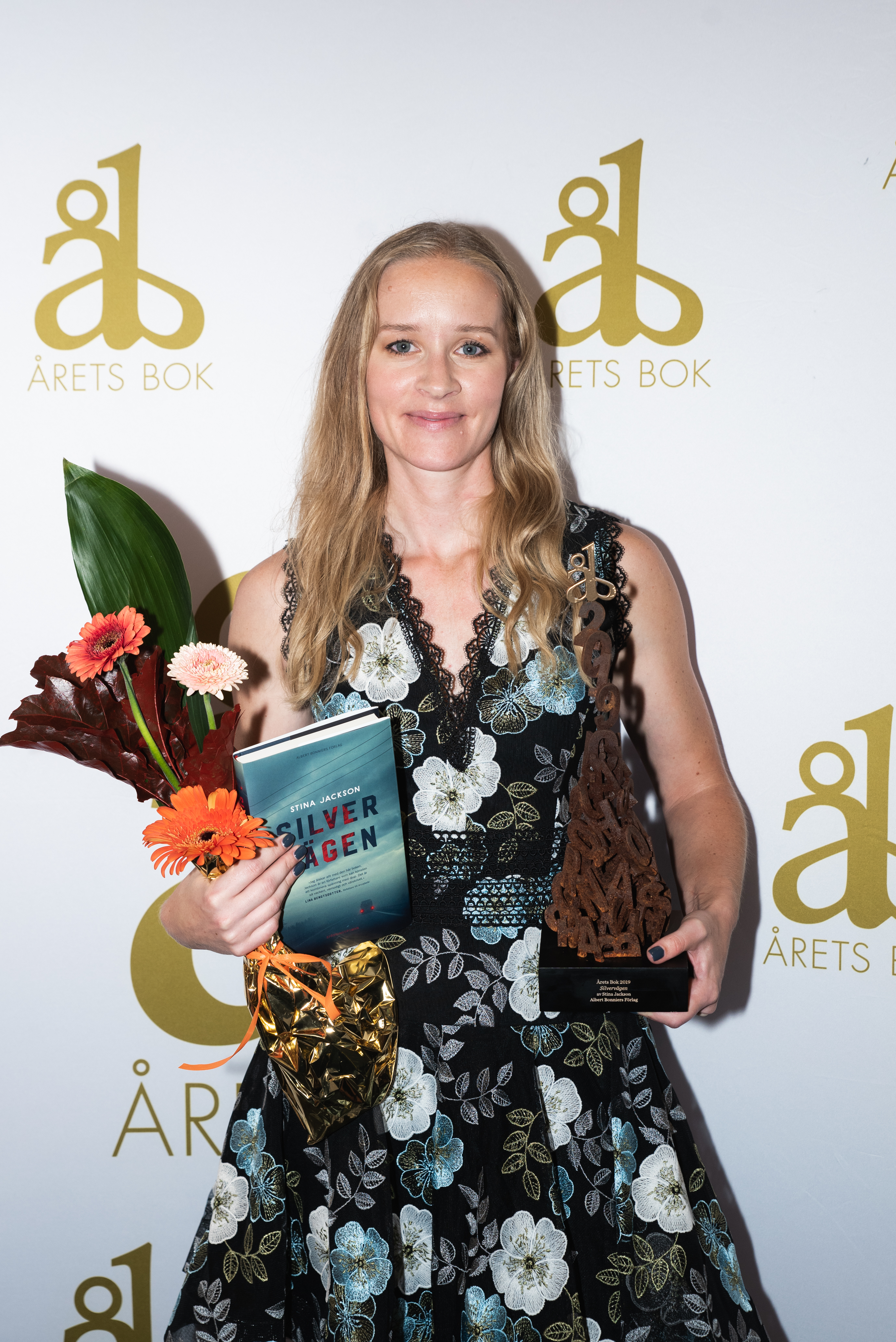
- Born: 1983 (age 42–43); Skellefteå, Sweden
- Education: University of Colorado (BA, Summa cum Laude)
- Awards: Best Swedish Crime Novel Award (2018); Glass Key award (2019)

Stina Jackson (née Olofsson; born 1983) is a Swedish crime fiction writer, a recipient of the Best Swedish Crime Novel Award and the Glass Key award.

== Career ==
Jackson made her literary debut in 2018, with the crime novel Silvervägen. The novel was awarded the Best Swedish Crime Novel Award in 2018, and the Glass Key award in 2019.

== Personal life ==
Born in 1983, in Skellefteå, Sweden, Jackson married American Robert Jackson and settled in Denver, Colorado. She eventually obtained double citizenship, both Swedish and American.
