= The Horrific Sufferings of the Mind-Reading Monster Hercules Barefoot =

Book by Carl-Johan Vallgren

- First edition
- Author: Carl-Johan Vallgren
- Original title: Den vidunderliga kärlekens historia
- Language: Swedish
- Published: 2002
- Publisher: Albert Bonniers förlag
- Publication place: Sweden
- Awards: August Prize of 2002

The Horrific Sufferings of the Mind-Reading Monster Hercules Barefoot (Swedish: Den vidunderliga kärlekens historia, lit. 'The Story of Monstrous Love') is a 2002 novel by Swedish author Carl-Johan Vallgren. It won the August Prize in 2002.
