= The Second Deadly Sin =

2011 novel by Åsa Larsson

- First edition (Swedish)
- Author: Åsa Larsson
- Original title: Till offer åt Molok
- Translator: Laurie Thompson
- Language: Swedish
- Series: Rebecka Martinsson, #5
- Genre: Crime fiction
- Publisher: Bonnier (Sweden); MacLehose Press (English)
- Publication date: 2011
- Publication place: Sweden
- English publication date: 2014
- Media type: Print (hardback & paperback)
- Pages: 352p. (English)
- Awards: Best Swedish Crime Novel Award
- ISBN: 9789100125318 (Swedish); 9781623651398 (English)
- Preceded by: Until Thy Wrath be Past

The Second Deadly Sin (Swedish: Till offer åt Molok, 2011) is a crime novel by Swedish writer Åsa Larsson, the fifth in the Rebecka Martinsson series. It was published by MacLehose Press in the UK on 1 February 2014 and in the US on 12 August 2014.

== Editions ==
- Åsa Larsson, Sacrificio a Moloch, traduzione di Katia De Marco, Marsilio, 2012. ISBN 978-88-317-1301-6.
- Åsa Larsson, Sacrificio a Moloch, traduzione di Katia De Marco, Marsilio, 2013. ISBN 978-88-317-1666-6.
- Åsa Larsson, Sacrificio a Moloch, traduzione di Katia De Marco, Universale Economica Feltrinelli, 2019. ISBN 978-88-297-0119-3.
