= Inger Frimansson =

Swedish writer

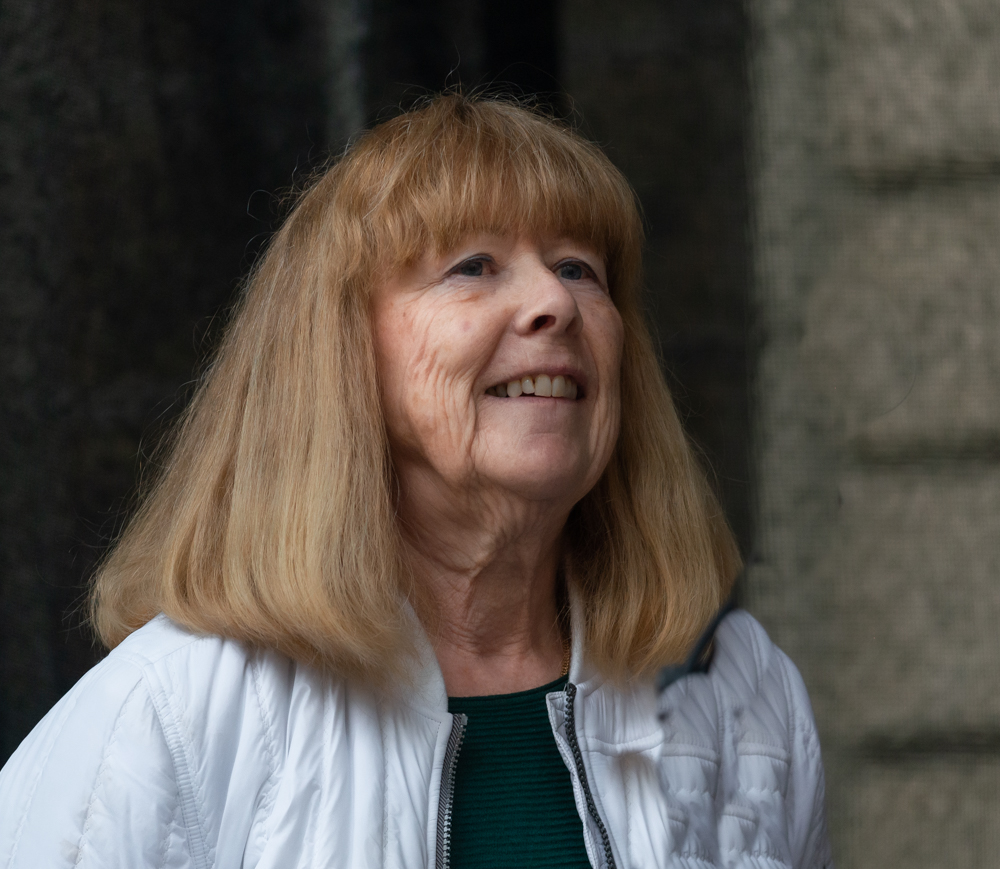
- Born: November 14, 1944 (age 81); Stockholm
- Occupations: Journalist, Novelist
- Writing career
- Genre: Crime fiction
- Website: www.frimansson.se

Inger Frimansson (born November 14, 1944, in Stockholm) is a popular Swedish novelist and crime writer. Having previously worked for 30 years as a journalist, her first novel The Double Bed (Dubbelsängen) was published in 1984. Since then she has written around twenty-five books including poetry, short stories, and books for children. Her breakthrough was with Godnatt, min älskade in 1998. Her crime novels are best described as psychological thrillers.

== Translated works ==
- 2007 Good Night, My Darling (Godnatt, min älskade, 1998), translated by Laura A. Wideburg
- 2008 The Shadow in the Water (Skuggan i vattnet, 2005), translated by Laura A. Wideburg
- 2009 (forthcoming) The Island of Naked Women (De nakna kvinnornas ö, 2002), translated by Laura A. Wideburg

== Awards ==
- 1998 - Best Swedish Crime Novel Award for Godnatt, min älskade.
- 2005 - Best Swedish Crime Novel Award for Skuggan i vattnet.
- 2008 - Gold - Best Translated Book for Good Night, my Darling translated by Laura A. Wideburg by ForeWord Magazine
