= Tom Kristensen (author) =

Norwegian writer (born 1955)

- Born: Tom Kristensen; 29 May 1955 (age 71); Tjøme Municipality, Norway
- Occupation: Writer
- Children: 3
- Writing career
- Language: Norwegian
- Period: 2001–present
- Genre: Thriller
- Notable works: Profitøren (2005), A Killing (2001)
- Notable awards: Riverton Prize (2006)

Tom Kristensen (born 29 May 1955) is a Norwegian writer, best known for his books in the thriller genre.

He was born on 29 May 1955. Kristensen has a career that includes banking, industrial management and international financial consultancy.

His first book, En kule (A Killing), was published in 2001.

He received the Riverton Prize in 2006.

== Bibliography ==
- 2001: En kule (A Killing)
- 2002: Hvitvasking (Laundering)
- 2003: Freshwater
- 2005: Profitøren (The Profiteer)
- 2006: Dødsriket (Realm of the Dead)
- 2008: Dragen (The Dragon)
- 2010: Dypet (The Deep)
- 2012: Korsbæreren (The Crusader)
