= Kim Småge =

Norwegian novelist (born 1945)

- Born: Anne Karin Thorhus; 23 June 1945 (age 81)
- Occupations: Novelist; Short story writer Children's writer
- Writing career
- Pen name: Kim Småge
- Language: Norwegian
- Period: 1983–
- Genre: Crime fiction
- Notable works: Nattdykk; Sub rosa
- Notable awards: Riverton Prize; Glass Key award

Anne Karin Thorhus (born 23 June 1945), known under the pseudonym Kim Småge, is a Norwegian novelist, crime fiction writer, writer of short stories, and children's writer.

Her literary breakthrough came in 1983 with the crime thriller Nattdykk (Night diving), a book which earned her the Riverton Prize. Her novels have not been published in English yet.

== Background ==
Anne Karin Thorhus was born in Trondheim, to parents Rune Sanfrid Thorhus and Hjørdis Wedø. She is married to playwright Edvard Normann Rønning. She is cand.mag. from the University of Trondheim. She was the first female scuba diving instructor of the Norwegian Diving Federation (Norwegian: Norsk Dykkerforbund).

== Literary career ==
Kim Småge's first two crime novels, Nattdykk (1983) and Origo (1984) feature the character "Hilke", a female diver, as the main character. She followed up with the thrillers Kainan (1986) and Lex Love (1991). She also wrote two youth novels, Figurene in 1986, and Interrail in 1988. Kvinnens lange arm (1992) is a collection of crime short stories. The crime novels Sub Rosa (1993), En kjernesunn død (1995), Containerkvinnen (1997), Solefall (2002) and Dobbeltmann (2004) all feature the police detective "Anne-kin Halvorsen" as main character.

With her novel Nattdykk Småge was the first woman in what has been called "a new female wave in Norwegian crime fiction".

Småge was a board member of the Norwegian Authors' Union from 1987 to 1991, and again from 2002 to 2004. She served as president of the society Skandinaviske Kriminelle Selskap in 2001.

Småge was awarded the Riverton Prize in 1984, and the Glass Key award (for best Scandinavian crime novel) for Sub Rosa in 1993. She has received the Palle Rosenkrantz Prize for best novel translated into Danish (for En kernesund død).
