= Tove Alsterdal =

Swedish writer (born 1960)

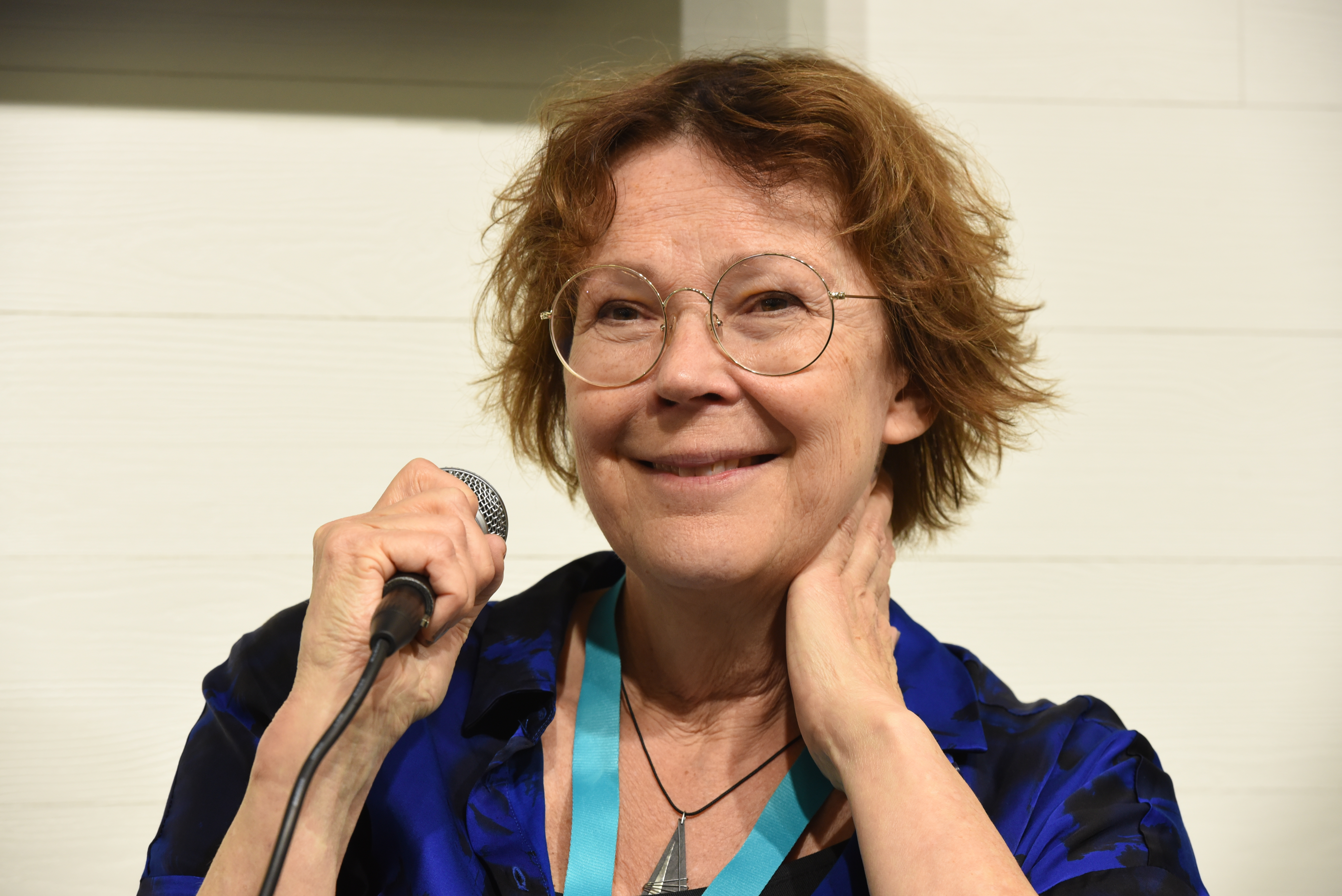
- Born: 1960 (age 65–66); Malmö, Sweden
- Occupation: Writer
- Awards: Best Swedish Crime Novel Award (2014, 2020); Glass Key award (2021)

Tove Alsterdal (born 1960) is a Swedish journalist, playwright, screenwriter and crime fiction writer. Her awards include the Best Swedish Crime Novel Award and the Glass Key award.

== Career ==
Alsterdal graduated as journalist from Kalix Folkhögskola in 1985. She has worked as journalist, playwright and screenwriter, and has been editor of several of Liza Marklund's books. She wrote the script for Helena Bergström's film Så olika from 2009, and the libretto for Fredrik Högberg's opera Woman of Cain.

She made her crime novel debut in 2009, with Kvinnorna på stranden. Her novel Låt mig ta din hand was awarded the Best Swedish Crime Novel Award in 2014. Her novel Rotvälta was awarded the Best Swedish Crime Novel Award in 2020, and the Glass Key award in 2021.

== Personal life ==
Born on 28 December 1960 in Malmö, Alsterdal grew up in Stockholm and Umeå. She is a daughter of Alvar Alsterdal and Elsa Bolin.
