= The Black Path (novel) =

2006 crime novel by Åsa Larsson

- First edition (Swedish)
- Author: Åsa Larsson
- Original title: Svart stig
- Translator: Marlaine Delargy
- Language: Swedish
- Series: Rebecka Martinsson, #3
- Genre: Crime fiction
- Publisher: Albert Bonniers förlag (Swedish); Bantam Dell (English)
- Publication date: August 2006
- Publication place: Sweden
- English publication date: 2008
- Media type: Print (hardback & paperback)
- Pages: 423p. (Swedish); 384p. (English)
- ISBN: 9789100115906 (Swedish); 9780385341011 (English)
- Preceded by: The Blood Spilt
- Followed by: Until Thy Wrath be Past

The Black Path (Swedish: Svart stig, 2006) is a crime novel by Swedish writer Åsa Larsson, the third in the Rebecka Martinsson series. It was published in the US in 2008 in paperback by Bantam Dell, and in the UK in 2012 in hardcover by MacLehose Press.

Irene Scobbie of Swedish Book Review states that the strength of the work is in the character portrayal and in the "authentic Lapland setting". She believes that several of the native Lapland characters have "an almost exotic flavour: an old woman with clairvoyant qualities, two peasant women with artistic gifts, and Killis’s young half-sister who embodies all these qualities and (less convincing in the final stages) becomes a kind of Pippi Longstocking figure as she takes on her half-brother’s enemies".
