= Sun Storm =

2003 novel by Åsa Larsson

Sun Storm (apa The Savage Altar)
- First edition (Swedish)
- Author: Åsa Larsson
- Original title: Solstorm
- Translator: Marlaine Delargy
- Language: Swedish
- Series: Rebecka Martinsson, #1
- Genre: Crime, mystery novel
- Publisher: Albert Bonniers förlag
- Publication date: 2003
- Publication place: Sweden
- English publication date: April 2006(US), April 2007 (UK)
- Media type: Print (hardback & paperback)
- ISBN: 0-385-34078-8
- OCLC: 83601732
- Followed by: The Blood Spilt

Sun Storm (Solstorm), published in the UK as The Savage Altar, is the first novel by Swedish crime-writer Åsa Larsson. The novel is the first in the Rebecka Martinsson series. It won Sweden's Best First Crime Novel award, and, on publication in the UK, was shortlisted for the Duncan Lawrie International Dagger, awarded by the CWA for crime novels in translation. The novel is translated into English by Marlaine Delargy.

== Editions ==
- Sun Storm (New York, Delacorte Press, ISBN 978-0-385-33981-0)
- Sun Storm (New York, Delta Trade Paperbacks, ISBN 978-0-385-34078-6)
- The Savage Altar (London, Viking, ISBN 978-0-670-91614-6)

== Film ==
- Solstorm was produced in 2007 with Izabella Scorupco as Rebecka Martinsson.
