= Jørgen Gunnerud =

Norwegian crime fiction writer (1948–2025)

- Born: 2 June 1948; Oslo, Norway
- Died: 21 May 2025 (aged 76)
- Occupation: Crime fiction writer
- Awards: Riverton Prize (2007)

Jørgen Gunnerud (2 June 1948 – 21 May 2025) was a Norwegian crime fiction writer. He was awarded the Riverton Prize in 2007.

== Life and career ==
Gunnerud was born in Oslo on 2 June 1948.

He made his literary debut in 1994, with the novel Raymond Isaksens utgang. Further novels are Kvinnen fra Olaf Ryes plass from 1996 and Gjerningsmann: ukjent from 1998. He was awarded the Riverton Prize in 2007, for the novel Høstjakt. The "hero" in Gunnerud's novels is police officer "Knut Moen".

In the 1960s, Gunnerud joined the political movement associated with AKP (m-l).

Gunnerud died on 21 May 2025, at the age of 76, due to complications after heart valve surgery.
