= Schakt =

Series of Swedish horror short story anthologies

Schakt was a series of Swedish horror short story anthologies published between 2005 and 2007, with Kent Björnsson as editor and publisher. The series published five anthologies before it was discontinued: Mytiska maskiner och andra mardrömmar, Skrämmande skogar och andra osunda platser, Kosmiskt kaos och andra katastrofer, Krälande Cthulhu och andra bedrägliga blindskär, and Mardrömmar i midvintertid och andra morbiditeter, with authors such as Gull Åkerblom, Johan Theorin, Andreas Roman, K.G. Johansson and Rickard Berghorn. Johan Theorin's "Endast jag är vaken" (Mardrömmar i midvintertid och andra morbiditeter) was awarded with the Catahya Award for best science fiction, fantasy or horror short story published in Swedish 2007.
