= Vidar Sundstøl =

Norwegian crime fiction writer

- Born: 30 June 1963 (age 63); Drangedal Municipality, Norway
- Occupation: Crime fiction writer
- Awards: Riverton Prize (2008)

Vidar Sundstøl (born 30 June 1963) is a Norwegian writer. He received the crime fiction award, the Riverton Prize, for 2008.

== Biography ==
Born in Drangedal Municipality on 30 June 1963, Sundstøl made his literary debut in 2005, with the novel Kommandolinjer. Further novels are I Alexandria from 2006 and Tingene hennes from 2007. He was awarded the Riverton Prize for the novel Drømmenes land from 2008.

== Bibliography ==
- Kommandolinjer (2005)
- I Alexandria (2006)
- Tingene hennes (2007)
- Drømmenes land (2008)
- De døde (2009)
- Ravnene (2011)
- Besettelsen (2013)
- Djevelens giftering (2015)
- Hullet han krøp ut av(2019)
- Oseberg (2020)
