= Erik Otto Larsen =

Danish novelist

Erik Otto Larsen (1931 – January 2008) was a Danish novelist, who was active as a visual artist before starting as a writer. He received the Glass Key award in 1995 for the crime novel Masken i spejlet (1994).

== Selected bibliography ==
- Pondus sidste sag (1988)
- Så længe jeg lever (1989)
- Manden der holdt op med at smile (1990)
- Frihedens skygge (1990)
- Masken i spejlet (1994)
- En kat fortræd (1996)
