= Idar Lind =

Norwegian writer (born 1954)

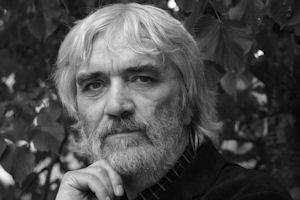
- Idar Lind
- Born: 23 September 1954 (age 71); Otterøya, Norway
- Occupations: novelist, crime fiction writer, songwriter, playwright and children's writer
- Awards: Riverton Prize (1989)

Idar Lind (born 23 September 1954) is a Norwegian novelist, crime fiction writer, songwriter, and playwright.

== Biography ==
Lind was born on the island of Otterøya (now part of Namsos Municipality) in Nord-Trøndelag county, Norway. He made his literary debut in 1983 with Stengte dører. He was awarded the Riverton Prize in 1989 for the crime novel 13 takters blues.

His crime novel Hotell Tordenskjold (1985) introduced the characters "Kristian António Steen", a hotel porter of Spanish descent, and police officer "Breheim", as detectives. The same detectives also solved crime problems in the sequels Ormens gift (1986) and 13 takters blues (1989). Further crime novels are Som to dråper blod (1993), Usynlige spor (1994), and Hysj (1996).

Lind published the song collection Bakfot bok in 1980. His plays include Korsvikaspillet (1995) and Skottet i Buvika (2008). The Drakeblod series (3 volumes 1988–1991) for young adults is set in the Viking Age.
