= Anker Rogstad =

Norwegian safecracker and writer (1925–1994)

- Born: Anker Rogstad; 8 January 1925; Oslo, Norway
- Died: 5 October 1994 (aged 69); Oslo
- Occupation: Crime writer
- Writing career
- Language: Norwegian
- Genre: Crime fiction
- Notable works: Etterlyst, Lansen
- Notable awards: Riverton Prize, 1974

Anker Rogstad (8 January 1925 – 5 October 1994) was a Norwegian convicted safecracker and writer. He spent eight years in prison for his crimes, but later achieved success by writing crime novels. He started writing during imprisonment, and made his literary debut in 1956 with the crime novel Etterlyst. He was awarded the Riverton Prize in 1974 for the novel Lansen.

== Select bibliography ==
- Etterlyst (1956)
- Jurister i kasjotten (1969)
- Lansen (1974)
- Hevnen (1975)
- Ærens pris (1986)
