= Riverton Prize =

Norwegian literary award

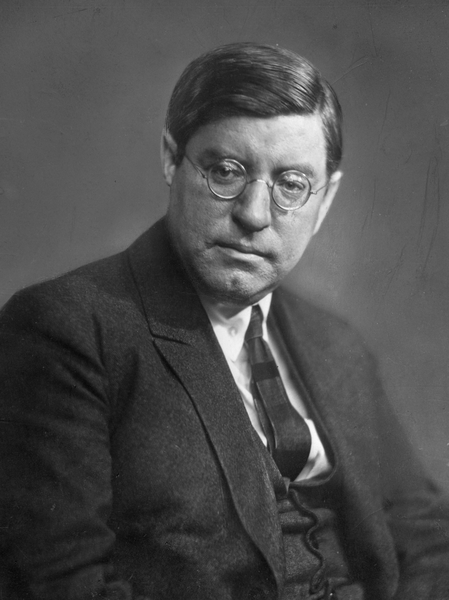
The Riverton prize is named for Sven Elvestad who published detective stories under the pen name Stein Riverton.

The Riverton Prize (Norwegian: Rivertonprisen) is a literature award given annually to the best work of Norwegian crime fiction (novel, short story, play, original screenplay).

The prize is named after the Norwegian journalist and author Sven Elvestad (1884-1934) who published detective stories under the pen name Stein Riverton.

== Winners ==
Year	Author	Title
2024	Eva Fretheim	Fuglekongen
2023	Anne Holt	Tolv ustemte hester
2022	Torkil Damhaug	Hund uten grav
2021	Heine Bakkeid:	St. Avenger
2020	Sven Petter Næss	Skjebnesteinen
2019	Jo Nesbø	Kniv
2018	Unni Lindell	Dronen
2017	Aslak Nore	Ulvefellen
2016	Torkil Damhaug	En femte årstid
2015	Kjell Ola Dahl	Kureren
2014	Karin Fossum	Helvetesilden (Hellfire)
2013	Gard Sveen	Den siste pilegrimen
2012	Jørn Lier Horst	Jakthundene
2011	Torkil Damhaug	Ildmannen
2010	Chris Tvedt	Dødens sirkel
2009	Tom Egeland	Lucifers evangelium
2008	Vidar Sundstøl	Drømmenes land
2007	Jørgen Gunnerud	Høstjakt
2006	Tom Kristensen	Dødsriket
2005	Frode Grytten	Flytande bjørn
2004	Ulf Breistrand, Jarl Emsell Larsen	Svarte penger, hvite løgner (television series)
2003	Kurt Aust	Hjemsøkt
2002	Gunnar Staalesen	Som i et speil
2001	Jon Michelet	Den frosne kvinnen
2000	Kjell Ola Dahl	En liten gyllen ring
1999	Unni Lindell	Drømmefangeren
1998	Jan Mehlum	Kalde hender
1997	Jo Nesbø	Flaggermusmannen
1996	Karin Fossum	Se deg ikke tilbake (Don't Look Back)
1995	Kolbjørn Hauge	Død mann i boks
1994	Anne Holt	Salige er de som tørster
1993	Morten Harry Olsen	Begjærets pris
1992	Arild Rypdal	Orakel
1991	Audun Sjøstrand	Valsekongens fall
1990	Ingvar Ambjørnsen	Den mekaniske kvinnen
1989	Idar Lind	13 takters blues
1988	Alf R. Jacobsen	Kharg
1987	Lars Saabye Christensen	Sneglene
1986	Edith Ranum	Ringer i mørkt vann (audio theatre)
1985	Michael Grundt Spang	Spionen som lengtet hjem (The Spy Who Longed for Home)
1984	/	/
1983	Kim Småge	Nattdykk
1982	Torolf Elster	Thomas Pihls annen lov
1981	Jon Michelet	Hvit som snø
1980	Fredrik Skagen	Kortslutning
1979	Helge Riisøen	Operasjon
1978	Jon Bing, Tor Åge Bringsværd	Blindpassasjer (television series)
1977	/	/
1976	Pio Larsen	Den hvite kineser
1975	Gunnar Staalesen	Rygg i rand, to i spann
1974	Anker Rogstad	Lansen
1973	David Torjussen (Tor Edvin Dahl)	Etterforskning pågår
1972	Sigrun Krokvik	Bortreist på ubestemt tid

- 2019, Jo Nesbo
- 2020, Sven Petter Næss
- 2021, Heine Bakkeid
