= Jan Mehlum =

Norwegian writer and sociologist

- Born: 1 January 1945 (age 81); Tønsberg, Norway
- Education: University of Oslo
- Occupations: Crime fiction writer Sociologist
- Awards: Riverton Prize (1998)

Jan Mehlum (born 1 January 1945) is a Norwegian crime fiction writer and sociologist. He was awarded the Riverton Prize in 1998 for the crime novel Kalde hender.

== Personal life and early career ==
Mehlum was born in Tønsberg on 1 January 1945.

He studied at the University of Oslo, and is an economist and sociologist by education. He has work experience in various fields such as education, business and culture. He founded the private cinema Tønsberg Kino, and has taken an active part in contemporary debates, including writing non-fiction books.

== Literary career ==
Mehlum made his crime fiction debut in 1996 with Gylne tider, and was awarded the Riverton Prize for 1998 for his second crime novel, Kalde hender.

His next book was Det annet kinn from 1999, and his crime novels in the early 2000s include En rettferdig dom (2000), En nødvendig død (2002), Den siste dansen (2004), Din eneste venn (2005), For Guds skyld (2007), Det ingen vet (2008), Madrugada (2009), and Bake kake søte (2010). Most of his crime novels are set in Tønsberg, with the protagonist Svend Foyn, a lawyer, solving the crime cases. The real-life Svend Foyn is a well-known historical personality from Tønsberg, a pioneer of seal hunting and whale hunting.

Mehlum's books from the 2010s include the crime novels Straffen (2011) and En god sak (2012), the thriller Lengsel etter penger from 2013, and the crime novels Ren samvittighet (2014), Et hardt slag (2015), To komma åtte sekunder (2016), and Hvit engel, svart natt (2018). In Fornemmelse av skyld from 2019, Foyn consults Varg Veum, when part of the novel is set in Bergen.

In 2020 Mehlum published the novel Lang tids reise, a disappearance mystery. His novel Ut av tiden from 2022 is a murder case where one of protagonist Foyn’s friends is the victim. In the novel Etterpå er vi alle kloke from 2023 Foyn investigates a case where the statute of limitations has passed.

In 2025 he published the crime novel Inn i mørket.

== Bibliography ==
- Gylne tider (1996)
- Kalde hender (1998)
- Det annet kinn (1999)
- En rettferdig dom (2000)
- En nødvendig død (2002)
- Den siste dansen (2004)
- Din eneste venn (2005)
- For Guds skyld (2007)
- Det ingen vet (2008)
- Madrugada (2009)
- Bake kake søte (2010)
- Straffen (2011)
- En god sak (2012)
- Lengsel etter penger (2013)
- Ren samvittighet (2014)
- Et hardt slag (2015)
- To komma åtte sekunder (2016)
- Hvit engel, svart natt (2018)
- Fornemmelse av skyld (2019)
- Lang tids reise (2020)
- Ut av tiden (2022)
- Etterpå er vi alle kloke (2023)
- Inn i mørket (2025)

== Awards ==
- Riverton Prize (1998)
- Vestfolds litteraturpris (2003)
