= Edith Ranum =

Norwegian writer (1922–2002)

- Born: 23 May 1922; Kristiania, Norway
- Died: 25 October 2002 (aged 80); Oslo
- Occupations: Novelist and playwright
- Writing career
- Language: Norwegian
- Genre: Crime fiction
- Notable work: Ringer i mørkt vann (audio play series)
- Notable awards: Riverton Prize (1986)

Edith Ranum (23 May 1922 – 25 October 2002) was a Norwegian crime fiction writer, novelist and playwright.

== Biography ==
Ranum made her literary début in 1949 with the novel Efter siste akt. She has written several crime novels and audio plays. She was awarded the Riverton Prize in 1986, for the audio play series Ringer i mørkt vann.

Ranum was originally an actress, and started writing after she lost her sight due to illness.
