= Thomas Blomberg =

American criminologist

- Born: Thomas G. Blomberg
- Education: University of California, Berkeley (BA, MS, PhD)
- Occupation: Criminologist
- Scientific career
- Fields: Criminology

Thomas G. Blomberg is an American criminologist. He is an expert in criminology research and public policy; delinquency, education and crime desistance; penology and social control; and victim services. He is currently the Dean, Sheldon L. Messinger Professor of Criminology, and the executive director of the Center for Criminology and Public Policy Research at the Florida State University College of Criminology and Criminal Justice.

== Education ==
He attended the University of California, Berkeley, obtaining his B.A. in Sociology in 1969 and his M.S. and Ph.D. in Criminology in 1970 and 1973 respectively.
