= Chris Tvedt =

Norwegian crime fiction writer

- Born: 3 August 1954 (age 72); Bergen, Norway
- Occupations: Crime fiction writer Lawyer
- Notable work: Dødens sirkel (2010)
- Awards: Riverton Prize (2010)

Chris Tvedt (born 3 August 1954) is a Norwegian lawyer and crime fiction writer.

He was awarded the Riverton Prize In 2010.

== Biography ==
Tvedt was born in Bergen on 3 August 1954. A lawyer by profession, he made his literary debut in 2005 with the crime novel Rimelig tvil . A barrister, Mikael Brenne, is the protagonist in the debut novel and subsequent books. Further novels are Fare for gjentakelse (2007), Skjellig grunn til mistanke (2008), and Rottejegeren (2009). He was awarded the Riverton Prize for Dødens sirkel in 2010.

His 2012 novel Av jord er du kommet introduced the Kripos investigator Edvard Matre. His next books, Den blinde guden from 2013, and Djevelens barn from 2014, both with his wife Elisabeth Gulbrandsen as co-author, also had Edvard Matre as protagonist.

In the novels Den som forvolder en annens død from 2016, Bevisets stilling (2018), and Formildende omstendigheter (2019), Mikael Brenne is back as protagonist. In 2021 he wrote the novel Djevelen i detaljene, where both barrister Mikael Brenne and Kripos investigator Edvard Matre appear.

The same two, Martre and Brenne, also appear in his next novel, På ære og samvittighet (2023).
