= Jean Bolinder =

Swedish author (1935–2020)

- Born: 5 December 1935; Linköping Cathedral Congregation
- Died: 7 June 2020 (aged 84); Flädie

Jean Bolinder (5 December 1935 – 7 June 2020) was a Swedish author and film director.

Linköping-born Bolinder debuted in 1967 with the crime novel Skulle jag sörja då... in which he introduces the character Jöran and Marianne Bundin as problem solvers. The fictional couple later appeared in several of Bolinder's books.

Bolinder was born in Linköping but grew up in Enköping. He studied in Motala, whose history he frequently discussed in his novels. Bolinder studied at Uppsala University, graduating in 1964, and Lund University, graduating in 1971.

Bolinder also directed the films Hjernans storhet och fall, Flykt, and Ur askan i Elden.

He died on 7 June 2020.

== Bibliography ==
- Skulle jag sörja då... 1967
- Livet är kort 1968
- Liksom en leksak 1969
- Högsta rätt 1970
- Och sedan, när också du är död 1971
- Och pistolen full av smärta 1972
- Att läsa bilder 1973
- Livet är långt... 1973
- Du och ditt språk 1974
- Tio till att följa dig 1974
- I rättan tid 1975
- Purungen 1976
- Mannen med klumpfoten 1976 (under pseudonym Jesper Borghamn)
- Då fick jag se en blekgul häst 1976
- Peppar, peppar 1977
- Ett låst rum 1977
- Slutspel 1977
- Picassofisken 1977 (under pseudonym Elisabeth Schalin)
- 30-tal 1977
- Du behövs i laget, Karin! Tjejlaget 1 1978
- Ge inte upp, Birgitta! Tjejlaget 2 1978
- Gift dig inte, pappa! Tjejlaget 3 1978
- Gå på mål, Milijana Tjejlaget! 4 1978
- Näktergalen (detektivroman) 1978
- Stenskeppet 1978 (under pseudonym Elisabeth Schalin)
- 40-tal LiberLäromedel 1978 ISBN 91-40-55505-4
- En detektivroman 1979
- Bärnstensmannen 1980
- Fiktionen 1980
- 3.30,4 1981
- Strindbergsmördaren 1982
- Trollsländan 1982
- Den rätvinkliga triangeln 1983
- Snövit och dvärgarna1984
- För älskarns och mördarns skull 1985
- Glashavet 1985
- Lilla söta kusin 1986
- Manet och flugor 1987
- Gåves det en trolldom 1988
- Glimt av himmel och sol 1988
- Dödisgropen 1990
- Författaren A. Svenssons självbiografi 1992
- Berättelse för herr Hugo 1993
- Tack snälla döden 1994
- Fjärilseffekten 1995
- Grottan 1996
- Oskulden (detektivroman) 1997
- Bröd över mycket tvivelaktigt vatten 1998
- Dockan - en sommarsaga: roman om ett mord? 1999
- Du Janne! (detektivroman) 2000
- Vilddjuret: kriminalroman om en ond tid 2001
- Martin Luffas hemlighet eller Mannen som älskade Crofts 2002
- I skuggan av Bolinders verkstad: mitt liv som jag minns det 2003
- Bara början på en saga 2005
- Passageraren (roman) 2005
- Djävulen och det egna köttet 2007
- Längdhopp - på en söndag 2007
- Hultvik, Kristianstads län 2008
- Poliserna i Hultvik eller De tre musketörerna var egentligen fyra 2009
- Målsökande robot 2011
