= Carl-Johan Vallgren =

Swedish author, singer and musician (born 1964)

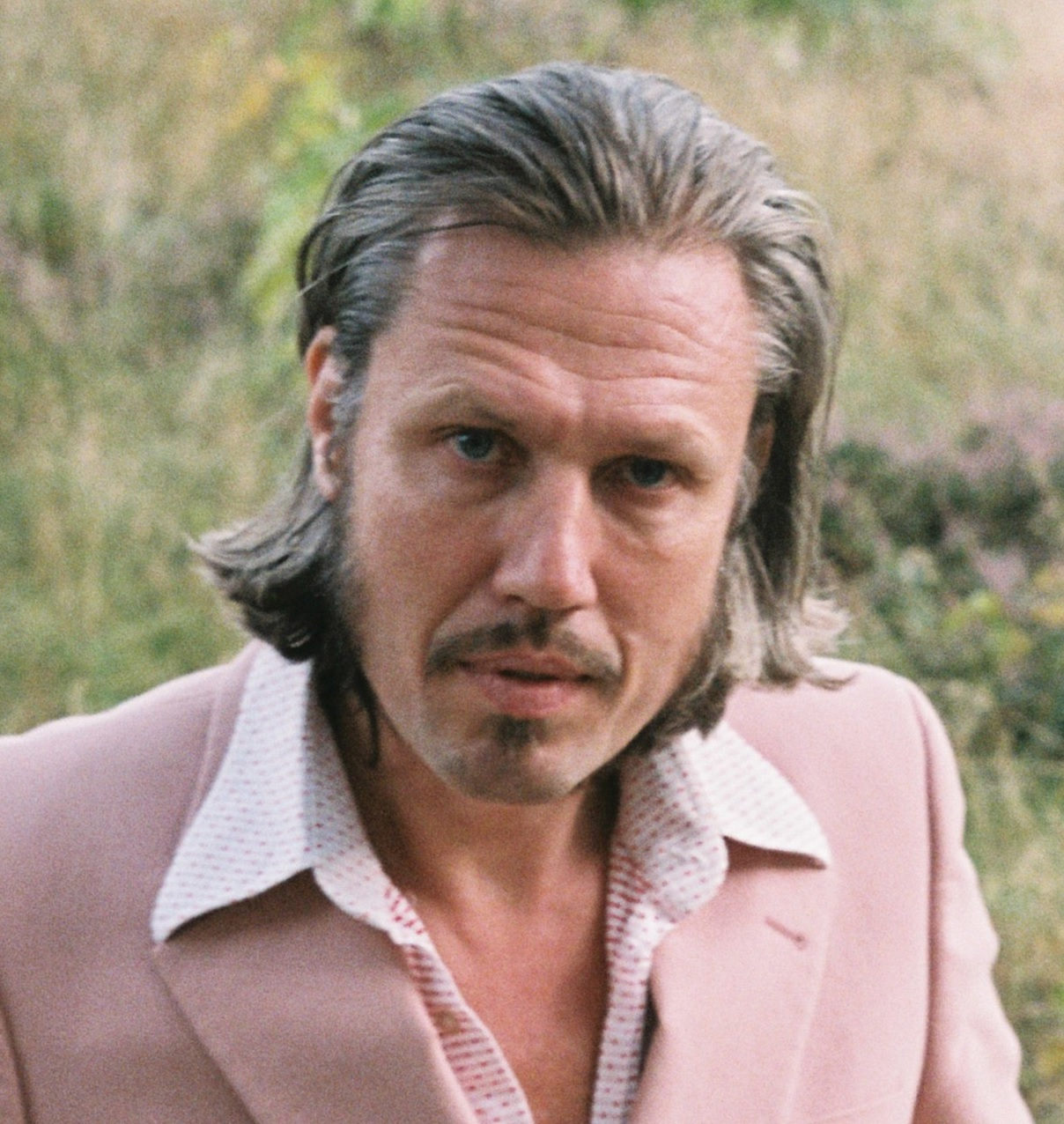
- Born: 26 July 1964 (age 62); Linköping
- Occupation: novelist
- Writing career
- Notable work: The Horrific Sufferings of the Mind-Reading Monster Hercules Barefoot

Carl-Johan Emanuel Vallgren (born 26 July 1964, in Linköping, Sweden) is a Swedish author, singer and musician. He won the August Prize in 2002 for the novel Den vidunderliga kärlekens historia, which was published in English translation as The Horrific Sufferings of the Mind-Reading Monster Hercules Barefoot.

== Personal life ==
Vallgren is of Finnish descent through his mother who was sent to Sweden as a Finnish war child during World War II.

== Bibliography ==
- Nomaderna (1987)
- Längta bort (1988)
- Fågelkvinnan (1990)
- Berättelser om sömn och vaka (1994)
- Dokument rörande spelaren Rubashov (1996)
- För herr Bachmanns broschyr (1998)
- Berlin på 8 kapitel (1999)
- The Horrific Sufferings of the Mind-Reading Monster Hercules Barefoot (2002)
- Kunzelmann och Kunzelmann (2009)
- Havsmannen (2012)
- Sviven, Eng: The Tunnel
- Skuggpojken, (2014) Eng: The Boy in the Shadows (2015)
- The Merman (2017)
