= Swedish Crime Writers' Academy =

The Swedish Crime Fiction Academy (Swedish: Svenska Deckarakademin), is a Swedish organization set up in 1971 to promote quality in Swedish detective fiction and crime fiction. Originally, the academy had 13 elected members; today the number of members is 24.

Prizes awarded each year by the Academy:

- Best Translated Crime Novel (Bästa översatta kriminalroman, formerly called The Martin Beck Award)
- Best Swedish Crime Novel (Bästa svenska kriminalroman; also called The Golden Crowbar award)

There are also a number of awards which are not necessarily presented annually (though the two first usually are):

- Best Swedish First Crime Novel (Bästa svenska deckarebut)
- The Bloodhound for best children's or young adult crime novel (Spårhunden)
- Grand Master Award for Lifetime Achievement
- Best Non-Fiction Work on crime fiction (Bästa faktabok)
- Award for outstanding translations (Berömvärd översättargärning)
- Special Award, given at the discretion of the Academy

Awards presented in the past:

- Special Grand Master Award (for achievements in crime fiction; given only twice, to central Swedish critics of crime fiction)
- Best Crime Novel Translated into Swedish – International
